= 2024 United States House of Representatives elections in Florida =

- November 5, 2024

All 28 Florida seats to the United States House of Representatives
	Majority party	Minority party
Party	Republican	Democratic
Last election	20	8
Seats won	20	8
Seat change	Steady	Steady
Popular vote	5,975,435	4,339,733
Percentage	57.86%	42.02%
Swing	▼0.39%	▲2.49%

Republican
50–60%
60–70%
70–80%
80–90%
90–100%
Democratic
50–60%
60–70%
90–100%

The 2024 United States House of Representatives elections in Florida were held on November 5, 2024, to elect the 28 U.S. representatives from the state of Florida, one from each of the state's congressional districts. The elections coincided with the U.S. presidential election, other elections to the House of Representatives, elections to the United States Senate, and various state and local elections. Primary elections took place on August 20.

== Background ==
On September 2, 2023, a Florida judge ruled that Florida's congressional map, created by Governor Ron DeSantis, violated the Florida Constitution and cannot be used for any future House elections. The issue was specifically on Florida's 5th district, then represented by Democrat Al Lawson, which was removed and replaced by a Republican-leaning district. This was controversial because the district had an African-American plurality. The state's successful appeal is to be challenged in front of the Florida Supreme Court, but a redrawn map was not created by election time. A concurrent federal lawsuit is also in progress.

== Overview ==
=== Statewide ===
Party	Candi- dates	Votes		Seats	
Party	Candi- dates	No.	%	No.	+/–
Republican Party	27	5,975,435	57.86%	20	Steady
Democratic Party	28	4,339,733	42.02%	8	Steady
Independents	2	10,007	0.10%	0	Steady
Libertarian Party	1	2,524	0.02%	0	Steady
Write-ins	8	223	0.00%	0	Steady
Total	66	10,327,922	100.00%	28	Steady

Popular vote
Republican	57.86%
Democratic	42.02%
Other	0.12%

House seats
Republican	71.43%
Democratic	28.57%

=== District ===
Results of the 2024 United States House of Representatives elections in Florida by district:

District	Republican		Democratic		Others		Total		Result
District	Votes	%	Votes	%	Votes	%	Votes	%	Result
District 1	274,108	66.04%	140,980	33.96%	0	0.00%	415,088	100.00%	Republican hold
District 2	247,957	61.64%	154,323	38.36%	0	0.00%	402,280	100.00%	Republican hold
District 3	241,174	61.61%	150,283	38.39%	0	0.00%	391,457	100.00%	Republican hold
District 4	222,364	57.26%	165,912	42.72%	73	0.02%	388,349	100.00%	Republican hold
District 5	267,471	63.07%	156,570	36.92%	23	0.01%	424,064	100.00%	Republican hold
District 6	284,414	66.53%	143,050	33.46%	10	0.00%	427,474	100.00%	Republican hold
District 7	233,937	56.53%	179,917	43.47%	0	0.00%	413,854	100.00%	Republican hold
District 8	280,352	62.24%	170,096	37.76%	0	0.00%	450,448	100.00%	Republican hold
District 9	138,076	42.58%	178,785	55.13%	7,412	2.29%	324,273	100.00%	Democratic hold
District 10	109,460	37.63%	181,455	62.37%	0	0.00%	290,915	100.00%	Democratic hold
District 11	269,277	60.38%	176,726	39.62%	0	0.00%	450,448	100.00%	Republican hold
District 12	306,487	71.04%	124,949	28.96%	0	0.00%	450,448	100.00%	Republican hold
District 13	225,636	54.82%	185,930	45.17%	27	0.01%	411,593	100.00%	Republican hold
District 14	145,643	41.59%	199,423	56.95%	5,119	1.46%	350,185	100.00%	Democratic hold
District 15	195,334	56.18%	152,361	43.82%	0	0.00%	347,695	100.00%	Republican hold
District 16	247,516	59.48%	168,625	40.52%	0	0.00%	416,141	100.00%	Republican hold
District 17	291,347	63.90%	164,566	36.10%	8	0.00%	455,921	100.00%	Republican hold
District 18	225,170	65.30%	119,637	34.70%	0	0.00%	416,141	100.00%	Republican hold
District 19	275,708	66.32%	140,038	33.68%	0	0.00%	415,746	100.00%	Republican hold
District 20	–	–	–	–	–	–	–	–	Democratic hold
District 21	277,435	61.82%	171,312	38.17%	19	0.00%	448,766	100.00%	Republican hold
District 22	165,248	45.04%	201,608	54.96%	0	0.00%	415,746	100.00%	Democratic hold
District 23	178,006	47.55%	196,311	52.45%	0	0.00%	374,317	100.00%	Democratic hold
District 24	90,692	31.76%	194,874	68.24%	22	0.01%	285,588	100.00%	Democratic hold
District 25	156,208	45.52%	186,942	54.47%	41	0.01%	343,191	100.00%	Democratic hold
District 26	217,199	70.92%	89,072	29.08%	0	0.00%	415,746	100.00%	Republican hold
District 27	199,159	60.38%	130,708	39.62%	0	0.00%	329,867	100.00%	Republican hold
District 28	210,057	64.57%	115,280	35.43%	0	0.00%	325,337	100.00%	Republican hold
Total	5,975,435	57.86%	4,339,733	42.02%	12,754	0.12%	10,327,922	100.00%	

== District 1 ==
2024 Florida's 1st congressional district election
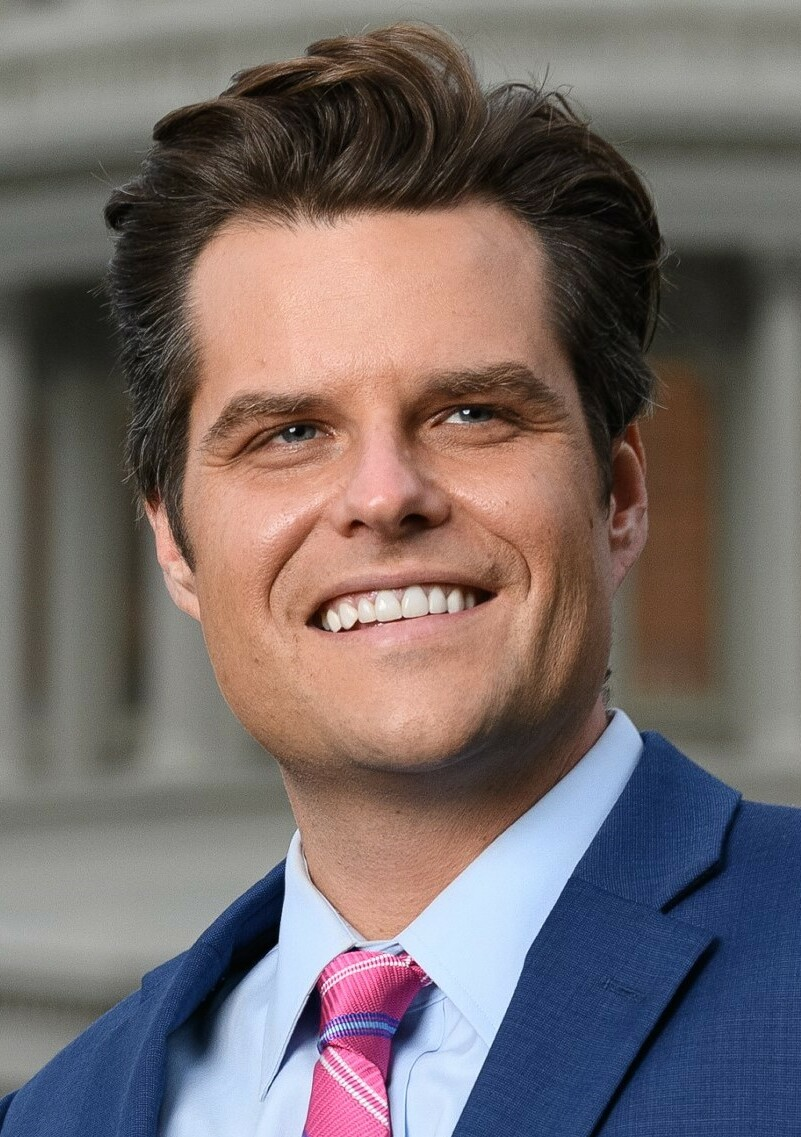

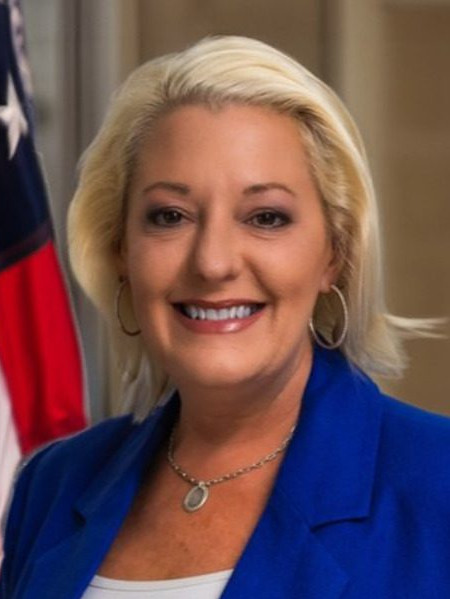
Nominee	Matt Gaetz	Gay Valimont
Party	Republican	Democratic
Popular vote	274,108	140,980
Percentage	66.0%	34.0%
- County results Gaetz: 50–60% 60–70% 70–80%
U.S. Representative before election
Matt Gaetz
Republican
Elected U.S. Representative
Matt Gaetz
(did not take his seat)
Republican

The incumbent was Republican Matt Gaetz, who was re-elected with 67.9% of the vote in 2022.

Although Gaetz won re-election, just over a week later, he resigned from Congress on November 13 after being nominated to become U.S. attorney general under Donald Trump. However, he withdrew from the nomination a week later, on November 21, due to controversy.

A special election was held on April 1, 2025, to replace Gaetz.

=== Republican primary ===
==== Nominee ====
- Matt Gaetz, incumbent U.S. representative

==== Eliminated in primary ====
- Aaron Dimmock, director for leadership programs at the University of West Florida's AWKO Center for Leadership

==== Endorsements ====
Aaron Dimmock

U.S. representatives

- Kevin McCarthy, former U.S. representative from California's 20th congressional district (2007–2023) and former speaker of the House (2023)
Matt Gaetz

Federal officials

- Donald Trump, former president of the United States and president-elect of the United States

Organizations

- College Republicans of America
- Latinos for America First
- Turning Point Action

==== Fundraising ====
Campaign finance reports as of June 30, 2024
Candidate	Raised	Spent	Cash on hand
Matt Gaetz (R)	$5,421,059	$4,208,719	$1,781,775
Aaron Dimmock (R)	$295,743	$33,086	$262,657
Source: Federal Election Commission

==== Polling ====
Poll source	Date(s) administered	Sample size (Note: Key: A – all adults RV – registered voters LV – likely voters V – unclear)	Margin of error	Aaron Dimmock	Matt Gaetz	Undecided
Fabrizio, Lee & Associates (Note: Poll sponsored by Gaetz's campaign)	July 8–10, 2024	400 (LV)	± 4.9%	20%	67%	13%

==== Results ====
Republican primary county results: Map legend: Gaetz—70–80%; Gaetz—60–70%

Republican primary results
Party	Candidate	Votes	%
Republican	Matt Gaetz (incumbent)	70,824	72.6
Republican	Aaron Dimmock	26,788	27.4
Total votes		97,612	100.0

=== Democratic primary ===
==== Nominee ====
- Gay Valimont, athletic trainer

==== Endorsements ====
Gay Valimont

Organizations

- Everytown for Gun Safety

==== Fundraising ====
Campaign finance reports as of June 30, 2024
Candidate	Raised	Spent	Cash on hand
Gay Valimont (D)	$458,095 (Note: $20,000 of this total was self-funded by Valimont)	$408,353	$49,743
Source: Federal Election Commission

=== General election ===
==== Predictions ====
Source	Ranking	As of
The Cook Political Report	Solid R	December 5, 2023
Inside Elections	Solid R	July 28, 2023
Sabato's Crystal Ball	Safe R	September 7, 2023
Elections Daily	Safe R	September 7, 2023
CNalysis	Solid R	November 16, 2023

==== Results ====
Florida's 1st congressional district, 2024
Party	Candidate	Votes	%
Republican	Matt Gaetz (incumbent)	274,108	66.0
Democratic	Gay Valimont	140,980	34.0
Total votes		415,088	100.0
Republican hold			

== District 2 ==
2024 Florida's 2nd congressional district election
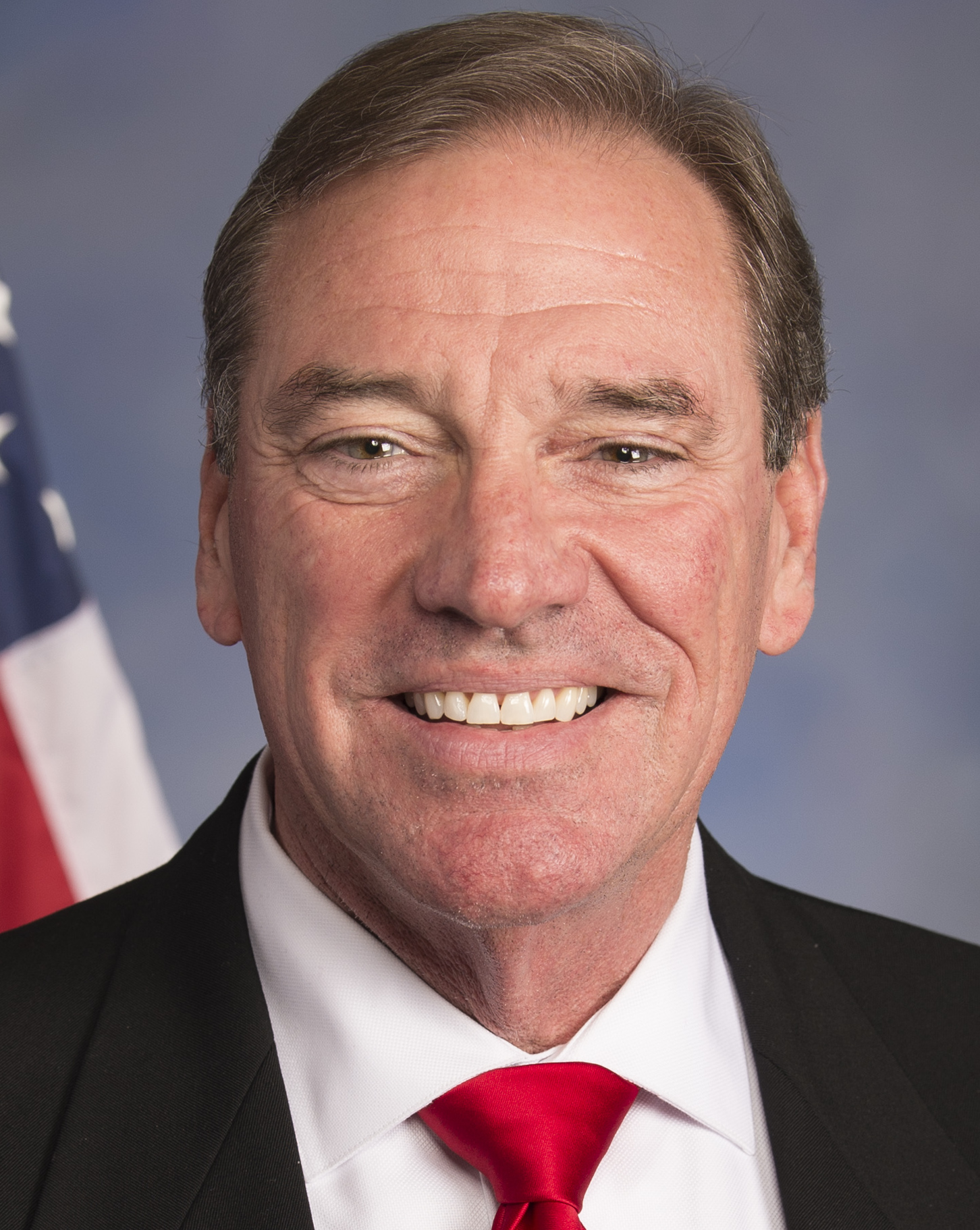

Nominee	Neal Dunn	Yen Bailey
Party	Republican	Democratic
Popular vote	247,957	154,323
Percentage	61.6%	38.4%
- County results Dunn: 60–70% 70–80% 80–90% >90% Bailey: 50–60% 60–70%
U.S. Representative before election
Neal Dunn
Republican
Elected U.S. Representative
Neal Dunn
Republican

The incumbent was Republican Neal Dunn, who was re-elected with 59.8% of the vote in 2022.

=== Republican primary ===
==== Nominee ====
- Neal Dunn, incumbent U.S. representative

==== Eliminated in primary ====
- Rhonda Woodward, former elementary school principal

==== Endorsements ====
Neal Dunn

Federal officials

- Donald Trump, former president of the United States and president-elect of the United States

U.S. senators

- Marco Rubio, Florida (2011–present)
- Rick Scott, Florida (2019–present)

Statewide officials

- Ron DeSantis, governor of Florida

Organizations

- AIPAC

==== Fundraising ====
Campaign finance reports as of June 30, 2024
Candidate	Raised	Spent	Cash on hand
Neal Dunn (R)	$1,178,129	$758,086	$665,049
Rhonda Woodward (R)	$16,506 (Note: $8,600 of this total was self-funded by Woodward)	$12,463	$4,042
Source: Federal Election Commission

==== Results ====
Republican primary results
Party	Candidate	Votes	%
Republican	Neal Dunn (incumbent)	69,113	82.7
Republican	Rhonda Woodward	14,456	17.3
Total votes		83,569	100.0

=== Democratic primary ===
==== Withdrew after nomination ====
- Meghann Hovey, account billing specialist

==== Replacement nominee ====
- Yen Bailey, lawyer

==== Fundraising ====
Campaign finance reports as of June 30, 2024
Candidate	Raised	Spent	Cash on hand
Meghann Hovey (D) (withdrawn)	$9,700	$10,440	$0.00
Source: Federal Election Commission

=== General election ===
==== Predictions ====
Source	Ranking	As of
The Cook Political Report	Solid R	December 5, 2023
Inside Elections	Solid R	July 28, 2023
Sabato's Crystal Ball	Safe R	September 7, 2023
Elections Daily	Safe R	September 7, 2023
CNalysis	Solid R	November 16, 2023

==== Results ====
Florida's 2nd congressional district, 2024
Party	Candidate	Votes	%
Republican	Neal Dunn (incumbent)	247,957	61.6
Democratic	Yen Bailey	154,323	38.4
Total votes		402,280	100.0
Republican hold			

== District 3 ==
2024 Florida's 3rd congressional district election
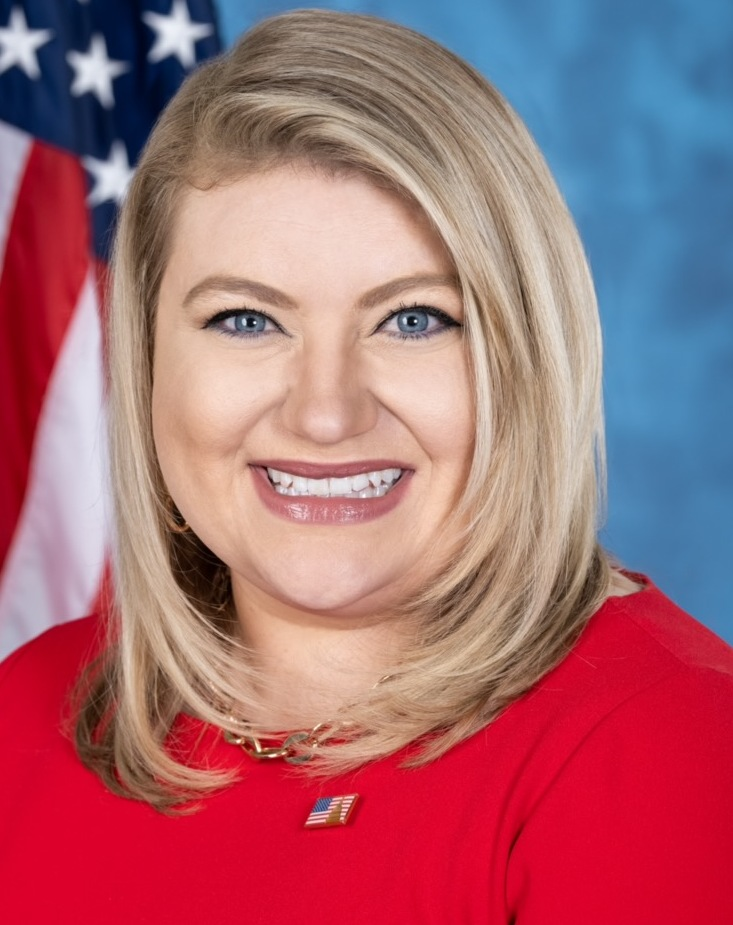

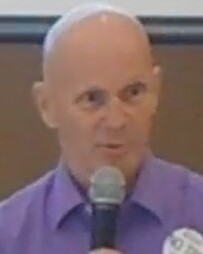
Nominee	Kat Cammack	Tom Wells
Party	Republican	Democratic
Popular vote	241,174	150,283
Percentage	61.6%	38.4%
- County results Cammack: 60–70% 70–80% 80–90% Wells: 50–60%
U.S. Representative before election
Kat Cammack
Republican
Elected U.S. Representative
Kat Cammack
Republican

The incumbent was Republican Kat Cammack, who was re-elected with 62.5% of the vote in 2022.

=== Republican primary ===
==== Nominee ====
- Kat Cammack, incumbent U.S. representative

==== Eliminated in primary ====
- Alec Stevens, realtor

==== Endorsements ====
Kat Cammack

Federal officials

- Donald Trump, former president of the United States and president-elect of the United States

Organizations

- AIPAC
- Log Cabin Republicans PAC
- Maggie's List
- National Right to Life Committee

==== Fundraising ====
Campaign finance reports as of June 30, 2024
Candidate	Raised	Spent	Cash on hand
Kat Cammack (R)	$1,953,664	$1,277,280	$715,787
Alec Stevens (R)	$16,900 (Note: $14,000 of this total was self-funded by Stevens)	$13,929	$2,971
Source: Federal Election Commission

==== Results ====
Republican primary results
Party	Candidate	Votes	%
Republican	Kat Cammack (incumbent)	69,962	87.1
Republican	Alec Stevens	10,340	12.9
Total votes		80,302	100.0

=== Democratic primary ===
==== Nominee ====
- Tom Wells, scientist and perennial candidate

=== General election ===
==== Predictions ====
Source	Ranking	As of
The Cook Political Report	Solid R	September 7, 2023
Inside Elections	Solid R	July 28, 2023
Sabato's Crystal Ball	Safe R	September 7, 2023
Elections Daily	Safe R	September 7, 2023
CNalysis	Solid R	November 16, 2023

==== Results ====
Florida's 3rd congressional district, 2024
Party	Candidate	Votes	%
Republican	Kat Cammack (incumbent)	241,174	61.6
Democratic	Tom Wells	150,283	38.4
Total votes		391,457	100.0
Republican hold			

== District 4 ==
2024 Florida's 4th congressional district election
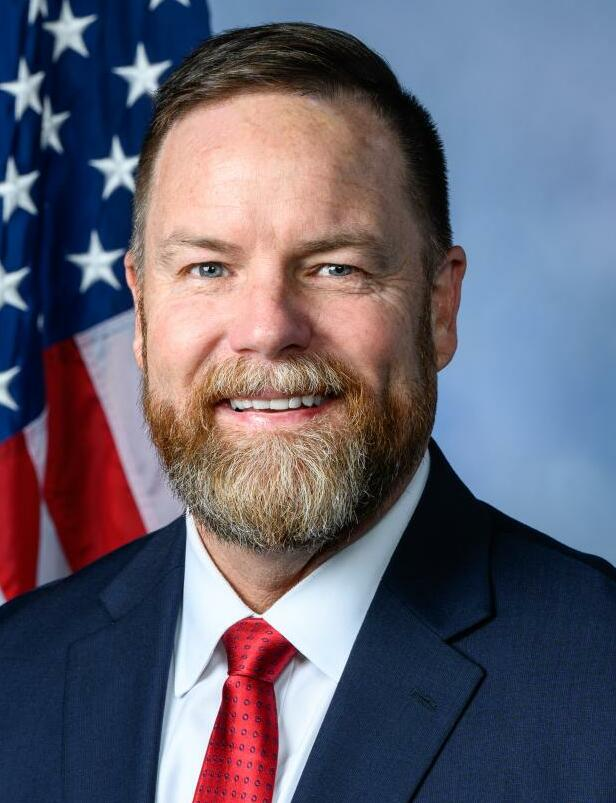

Nominee	Aaron Bean	LaShonda Holloway
Party	Republican	Democratic
Popular vote	222,364	165,912
Percentage	57.3%	42.7%
- County results Bean: 70–80% Halloway: 50–60%
U.S. Representative before election
Aaron Bean
Republican
Elected U.S. Representative
Aaron Bean
Republican

The incumbent was Republican Aaron Bean, who was elected with 60.5% of the vote in 2022.

=== Republican primary ===
==== Nominee ====
- Aaron Bean, incumbent U.S. representative

==== Withdrawn ====
- Robert Alvero, firefighter

==== Endorsements ====
Aaron Bean

Federal officials

- Donald Trump, former president of the United States and president-elect of the United States

Organizations

- AIPAC

==== Fundraising ====
Campaign finance reports as of March 31, 2024
Candidate	Raised	Spent	Cash on hand
Aaron Bean (R)	$879,552	$427,552	$538,667
Source: Federal Election Commission

=== Democratic primary ===
==== Candidates ====
===== Nominee =====
- LaShonda Holloway, former director in the District of Columbia Office of Documents and Administrative Issuances and nominee for this district in 2022

=== General election ===
==== Write-in candidates ====
- Todd Schaefer (Independent), real estate agent

==== Predictions ====
Source	Ranking	As of
The Cook Political Report	Solid R	September 7, 2023
Inside Elections	Solid R	July 28, 2023
Sabato's Crystal Ball	Safe R	September 7, 2023
Elections Daily	Safe R	September 7, 2023
CNalysis	Solid R	November 16, 2023

=== Polling ===
Poll source	Date(s) administered	Sample size	Margin of error	Aaron Bean (R)	LaShonda Holloway (D)	Undecided
University of North Florida	October 18–19, 2024	337 (LV)	± 5.84%	51%	44%	5%

==== Results ====
Florida's 4th congressional district, 2024
Party	Candidate	Votes	%
Republican	Aaron Bean (incumbent)	222,364	57.3
Democratic	LaShonda Holloway	165,912	42.7
Write-in	Todd Schaefer	73	0.0
Total votes		388,349	100.0
Republican hold			

== District 5 ==
2024 Florida's 5th congressional district election
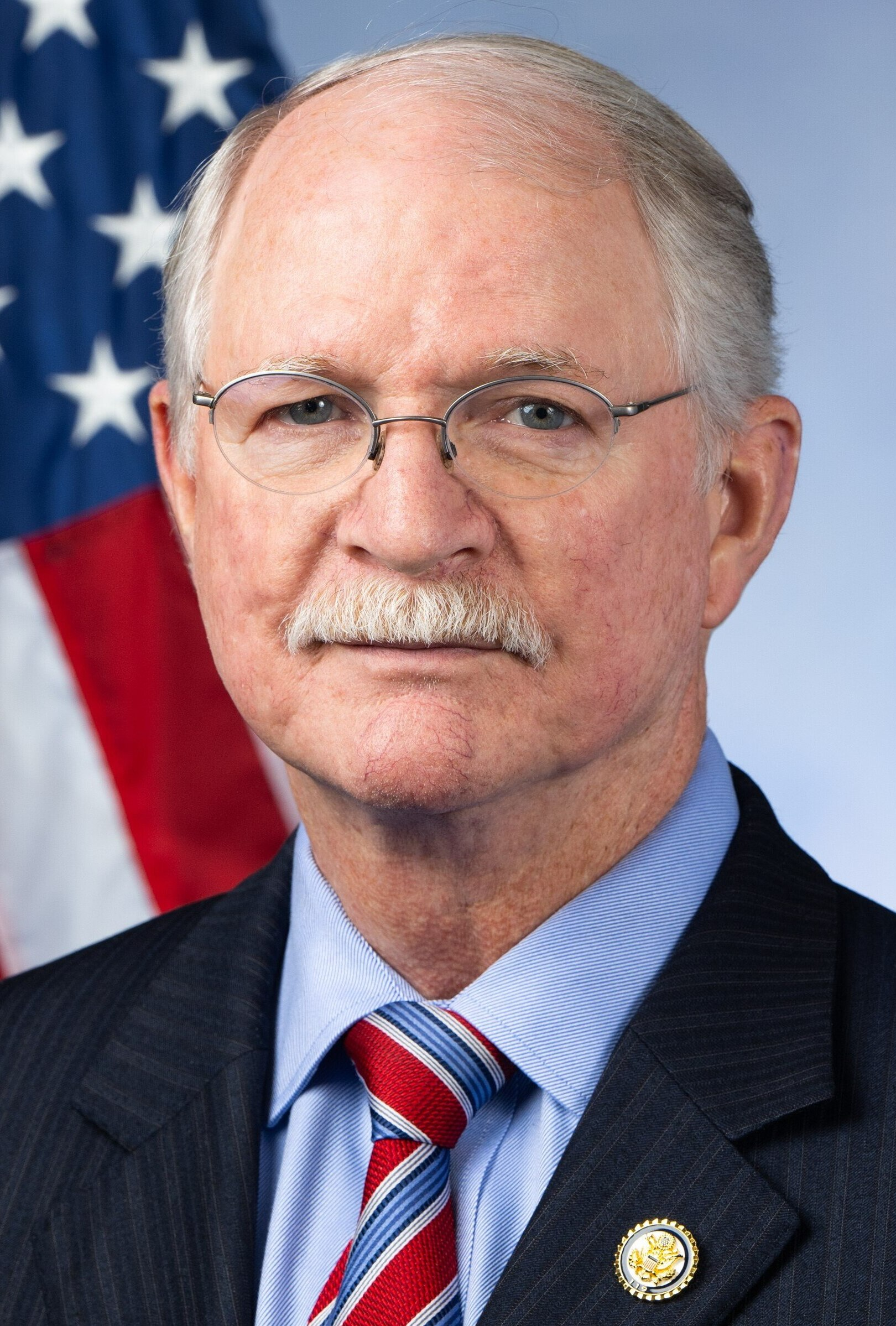

Nominee	John Rutherford	Jay McGovern
Party	Republican	Democratic
Popular vote	267,471	156,570
Percentage	63.1%	36.9%
- County results Rutherford: 50–60% 60–70%
U.S. Representative before election
John Rutherford
Republican
Elected U.S. Representative
John Rutherford
Republican

The incumbent was Republican John Rutherford, who was re-elected unopposed in 2022.

=== Republican primary ===
==== Nominee ====
- John Rutherford, incumbent U.S. representative

==== Eliminated in primary ====
- Mara Macie, stay-at-home parent and candidate for this district in 2022

==== Endorsements ====
John Rutherford

Federal officials

- Donald Trump, former president of the United States and president-elect of the United States

Organizations

- AIPAC

==== Fundraising ====
Campaign finance reports as of July 31, 2024
Candidate	Raised	Spent	Cash on hand
Mara Macie (R)	$64,575	$50,578	$16,872
John Rutherford (R)	$669,745	$439,550	$475,817
Source: Federal Election Commission

==== Results ====
Republican primary results
Party	Candidate	Votes	%
Republican	John Rutherford (incumbent)	48,628	67.1
Republican	Mara Macie	23,792	32.9
Total votes		72,420	100.0

=== Democratic primary ===
==== Nominee ====
- Jay McGovern, engineer and candidate for the 6th district in 2016

=== General election ===
==== Write-in candidate ====
- Gary Koniz

==== Predictions ====
Source	Ranking	As of
The Cook Political Report	Solid R	March 21, 2024
Inside Elections	Solid R	July 28, 2023
Sabato's Crystal Ball	Safe R	September 7, 2023
Elections Daily	Safe R	September 7, 2023
CNalysis	Solid R	November 16, 2023

==== Results ====
Florida's 5th congressional district, 2024
Party	Candidate	Votes	%
Republican	John Rutherford	267,471	63.1
Democratic	Jay McGovern	156,570	36.9
Write-in	Gary Koniz	23	0.0
Total votes		424,064	100.0
Republican hold			

== District 6 ==
2024 Florida's 6th congressional district election
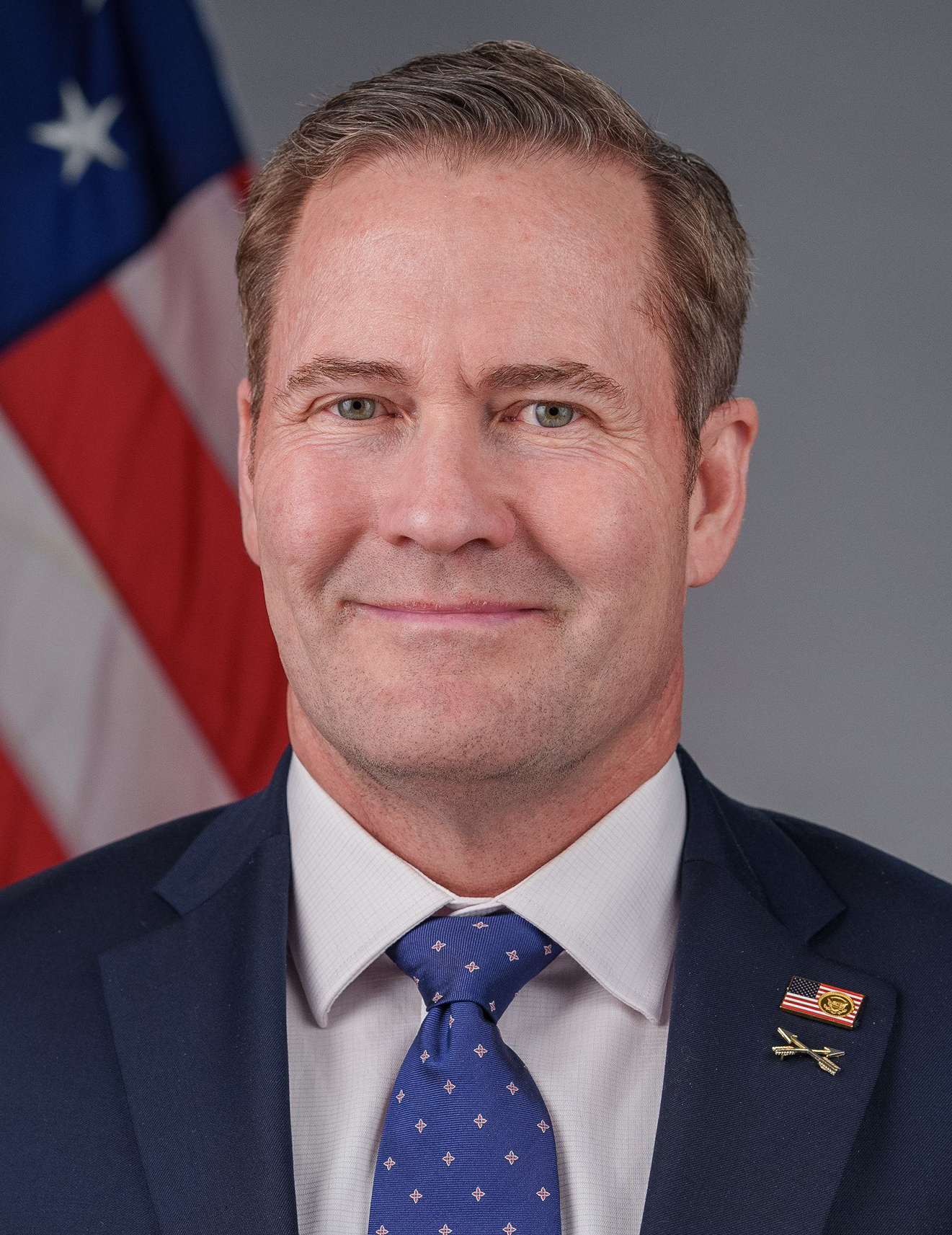

Nominee	Mike Waltz	James Stockton III
Party	Republican	Democratic
Popular vote	284,414	143,050
Percentage	66.5%	33.5%
- County results Waltz: 60–70% 70–80%
U.S. Representative before election
Michael Waltz
Republican
Elected U.S. Representative
Michael Waltz
Republican

The incumbent was Republican Michael Waltz, who was re-elected with 75.3% of the vote in 2022.

=== Republican primary ===
==== Nominee ====
- Mike Waltz, incumbent U.S. representative

==== Eliminated in primary ====
- John Grow, tech professional

==== Endorsements ====
Michael Waltz

Federal officials

- Donald Trump, former president of the United States and president-elect of the United States

Organizations

- AIPAC
- Pro-Israel America
- Volusia County Republican Party

==== Fundraising ====
Campaign finance reports as of July 31, 2024
Candidate	Raised	Spent	Cash on hand
John Grow (R)	$57,148	$38,521	$18,627
Michael Waltz (R)	$1,964,456	$1,567,497	$1,466,128
Source: Federal Election Commission

==== Results ====
Republican primary results
Party	Candidate	Votes	%
Republican	Michael Waltz (incumbent)	65,234	82.0
Republican	John Grow	14,280	18.0
Total votes		79,514	100.0

=== Democratic primary ===
==== Nominee ====
- James Stockton III, pastor

=== General election ===
==== Write-in ====
- Richard Dembinsky

==== Predictions ====
Source	Ranking	As of
The Cook Political Report	Solid R	September 7, 2023
Inside Elections	Solid R	July 28, 2023
Sabato's Crystal Ball	Safe R	September 7, 2023
Elections Daily	Safe R	September 7, 2023
CNalysis	Solid R	November 16, 2023

==== Results ====
Florida's 6th congressional district, 2024
Party	Candidate	Votes	%
Republican	Michael Waltz (incumbent)	284,414	66.5
Democratic	James Stockton III	143,050	33.5
Write-in	Richard Dembinsky	10	0.0
Total votes		427,474	100.0
Republican hold			

== District 7 ==
2024 Florida's 7th congressional district election
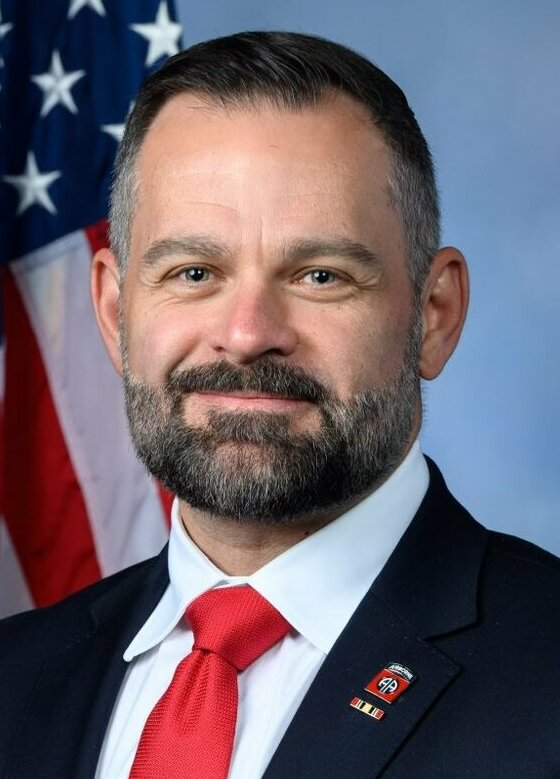

Nominee	Cory Mills	Jennifer Adams
Party	Republican	Democratic
Popular vote	233,937	179,917
Percentage	56.5%	43.5%
- County results Mills: 50–60% 60–70%
U.S. Representative before election
Cory Mills
Republican
Elected U.S. Representative
Cory Mills
Republican

The incumbent was Republican Cory Mills, who was elected with 58.5% of the vote in 2022.

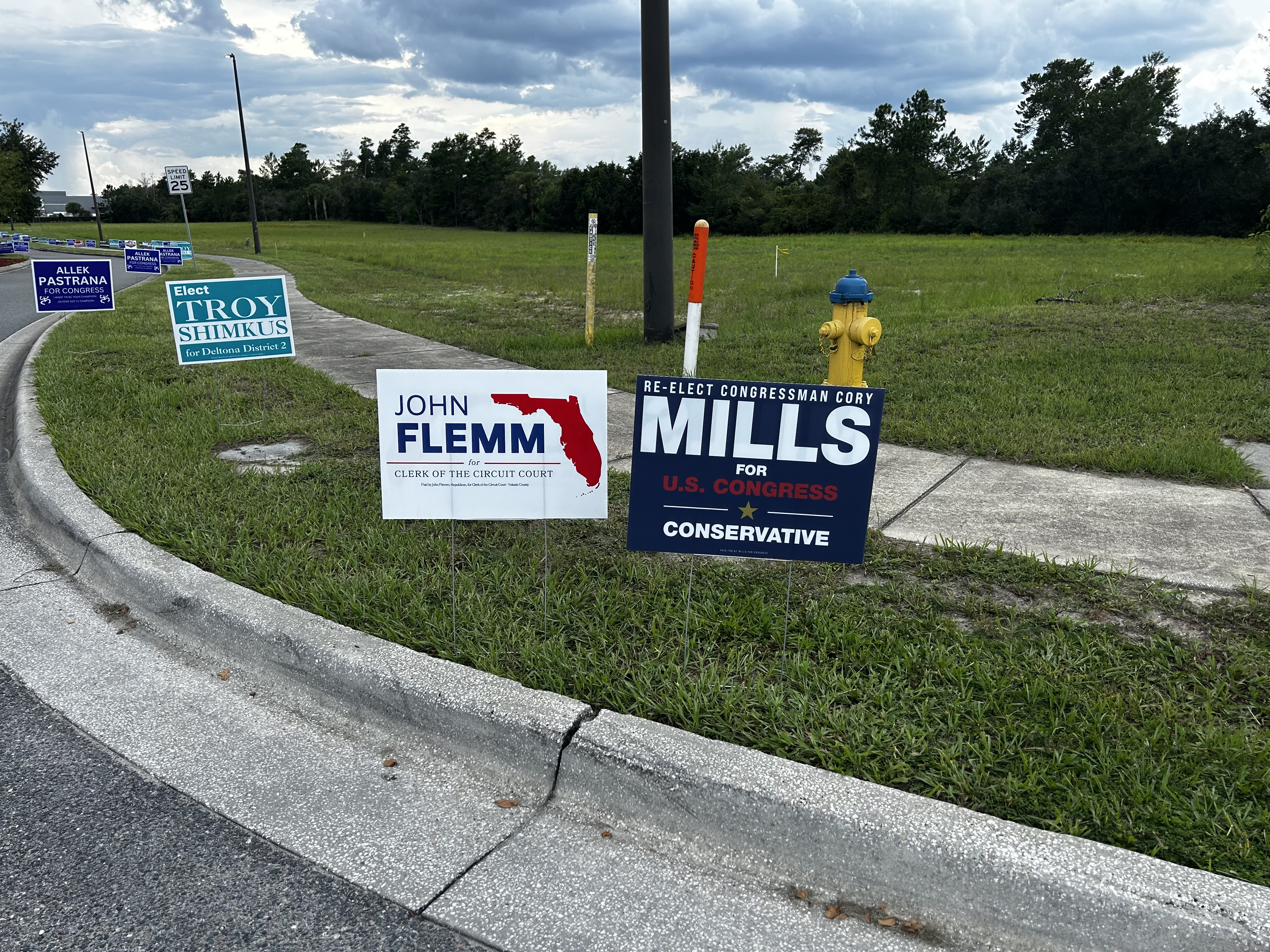
Mills and Pastrana campaign signs in Deltona, Florida, August 2024

=== Republican primary ===
==== Nominee ====
- Cory Mills, incumbent U.S. representative

==== Eliminated in primary ====
- Mike Johnson, activist (no relation to U.S. House Speaker Mike Johnson)

==== Endorsements ====
Cory Mills

Federal officials

- Donald Trump, former president of the United States and president-elect of the United States

Organizations

- AIPAC
- Volusia County Republican Party

==== Fundraising ====
Campaign finance reports as of July 31, 2024
Candidate	Raised	Spent	Cash on hand
Mike Johnson (R)	$41,109	$32,946	$8,163
Cory Mills (R)	$1,163,706 (Note: $93,538 of this total was self-funded by Mills)	$1,034,749	$154,978
Source: Federal Election Commission

==== Results ====
Republican primary results
Party	Candidate	Votes	%
Republican	Cory Mills (incumbent)	43,096	80.9
Republican	Mike Johnson	10,188	19.1
Total votes		53,284	100.0

=== Democratic primary ===
==== Nominee ====
- Jennifer Adams, mediator

==== Eliminated in primary ====
- Tatiana Fernandez, industrial supply company owner and candidate for this district in 2022
- Allek Pastrana, cyber engineer and candidate for this district in 2022

==== Fundraising ====
Campaign finance reports as of July 31, 2024
Candidate	Raised	Spent	Cash on hand
Jennifer Adams (D)	$193,444	$176,884	$16,559
Tatiana Fernandez (D)	$16,624	$15,177	$4,387
Allek Pastrana (D)	$40,084 (Note: $13,986 of this total was self-funded by Pastrana)	$39,102	$1,000
Source: Federal Election Commission

==== Debates ====
2024 Florida's 7th congressional district Democratic primary debates
No.	Date	Host	Moderator	Link	Democratic	Democratic	Democratic
Key: P Participant A Absent N Not invited I Invited W Withdrawn							
Key: P Participant A Absent N Not invited I Invited W Withdrawn					Adams	Fernandez	Pastrana
1	Jun. 6, 2024	Southeast Volusia County; Democratic Party		YouTube	N	P	P
2	Jul. 25, 2024	WESH	Greg Fox	YouTube	P	P	P

==== Results ====
Democratic primary results
Party	Candidate	Votes	%
Democratic	Jennifer Adams	23,191	62.6
Democratic	Allek Pastrana	7,844	21.2
Democratic	Tatiana Fernandez	5,982	16.2
Total votes		37,017	100.0

=== General election ===
==== Predictions ====
Source	Ranking	As of
The Cook Political Report	Solid R	September 7, 2023
Inside Elections	Solid R	July 28, 2023
Sabato's Crystal Ball	Safe R	September 7, 2023
Elections Daily	Safe R	November 4, 2024
CNalysis	Solid R	November 16, 2023

==== Polling ====
Poll source	Date(s) administered	Sample size	Margin of error	Cory Mills	Jennifer Adams	Undecided
Public Policy Polling (D) (Note: Poll sponsored by Adams's campaign)	June 13–14, 2024	594 (RV)	?	48%	43%	9%

==== Results ====
Florida's 7th congressional district, 2024
Party	Candidate	Votes	%
Republican	Cory Mills (incumbent)	233,937	56.5
Democratic	Jennifer Adams	179,917	43.5
Total votes		413,854	100.0
Republican hold			

== District 8 ==
2024 Florida's 8th congressional district election
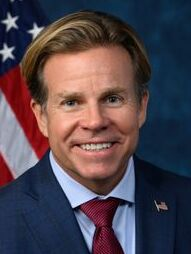

Nominee	Mike Haridopolos	Sandy Kennedy
Party	Republican	Democratic
Popular vote	280,352	170,096
Percentage	62.2%	37.8%
- County results Haridopolos: 60–70% 70–80%
U.S. Representative before election
Bill Posey
Republican
Elected U.S. Representative
Mike Haridopolos
Republican

The incumbent was Republican Bill Posey, who was re-elected with 64.9% of the vote in 2022.

=== Republican primary ===
==== Nominee ====
- Mike Haridopolos, former president of the Florida Senate (2010–2012) from the 26th district (2003–2012) and candidate for U.S. Senate in 2012

==== Eliminated in primary ====
- John Hearton, information assurance executive

==== Withdrawn ====
- Joe Babits, attorney (endorsed Hearton, remained on ballot)
- Bill Posey, incumbent U.S. representative (endorsed Haridopolos)

==== Declined ====
- Randy Fine, state representative (endorsed Haridopolos, ran for state senate)

==== Endorsements ====
Mike Haridopolos

Executive branch officials

- Donald Trump, former president of the United States and president-elect of the United States (2017–2021)

U.S. senators

- Marco Rubio, U.S. senator from Florida
- Rick Scott, U.S. senator from Florida

U.S. representatives

- Tom Emmer, majority whip of the U.S. House of Representatives
- Mike Johnson, speaker of the U.S. House of Representatives
- Bill Posey, incumbent U.S. representative
- Steve Scalise, majority leader of the U.S. House of Representatives
- Elise Stefanik, chair of the House Republican Conference

Statewide officials

- Ron DeSantis, governor of Florida
- Ashley Moody, Florida attorney general
- Jimmy Patronis, chief financial officer of Florida
- Wilton Simpson, Florida commissioner of agriculture

State legislators

- Randy Fine, state representative

Sheriffs

- Wayne Ivey, Brevard County sheriff
Bill Posey (withdrawn)

Executive branch officials

- Donald Trump, former president of the United States and president-elect of the United States

U.S. representatives

- Jim Jordan, U.S. representative from Ohio's 4th congressional district (2007–present)

Organizations

- AIPAC

==== Fundraising ====
Campaign finance reports as of December 31, 2023
Candidate	Raised	Spent	Cash on hand
John Hearton (R)	$256,025 (Note: $140,000 of this total was self-funded by Hearton)	$122,152	$133,872
Bill Posey (R)	$348,579	$245,723	$525,878
Source: Federal Election Commission

==== Debate ====
2024 Florida's 8th congressional district Republican primary debate
No.	Date	Host	Moderator	Link	Republican	Republican	Republican
Key: P Participant A Absent N Not invited I Invited W Withdrawn							
Key: P Participant A Absent N Not invited I Invited W Withdrawn					Babits	Hearton	Haridopolos
1	Jul. 10, 2024	WESH	Greg Fox	WESH	P	P	P

==== Polling ====
Poll source	Date(s) administered	Sample size	Margin of error	Joe Babits	Mike Haridopolos	John Hearton	Undecided
Spry Strategies (Note: Poll sponsored by Haridopolos's campaign)	July 23–26, 2024	532 (LV)	± 4.2%	4%	56%	6%	33%

==== Results ====
Republican primary results
Party	Candidate	Votes	%
Republican	Mike Haridopolos	61,710	72.1
Republican	John Hearton	18,604	21.7
Republican	Joe Babits (withdrawn)	5,250	6.1
Total votes		85,564	100.0

=== Democratic primary ===
==== Nominee ====
- Sandy Kennedy, attorney

==== Eliminated in primary ====
- Dan McDow, West Melbourne city councilor

==== Fundraising ====
Campaign finance reports as of December 31, 2023
Candidate	Raised	Spent	Cash on hand
Dan McDow (D)	$22,280 (Note: $3,510 of this total was self-funded by McDow)	$18,047	$4,232
Source: Federal Election Commission

==== Results ====
Democratic primary results
Party	Candidate	Votes	%
Democratic	Sandy Kennedy	24,701	60.7
Democratic	Dan McDow	15,999	39.3
Total votes		40,700	100.0

=== General election ===
==== Debate ====
2024 Florida's 8th congressional district debate
No.	Date	Host	Moderator	Link	Republican	Democratic
Key: P Participant A Absent N Not invited I Invited W Withdrawn						
Key: P Participant A Absent N Not invited I Invited W Withdrawn					Haridopolos	Kennedy
1	Sep. 27, 2024	WESH	Greg Fox	YouTube	P	P

==== Predictions ====
Source	Ranking	As of
The Cook Political Report	Solid R	September 7, 2023
Inside Elections	Solid R	July 28, 2023
Sabato's Crystal Ball	Safe R	September 7, 2023
Elections Daily	Safe R	September 7, 2023
CNalysis	Solid R	November 16, 2023

==== Results ====
Florida's 8th congressional district, 2024
Party	Candidate	Votes	%
Republican	Mike Haridopolos	280,352	62.2
Democratic	Sandy Kennedy	170,096	37.8
Total votes		450,448	100.0
Republican hold			

== District 9 ==
2024 Florida's 9th congressional district election
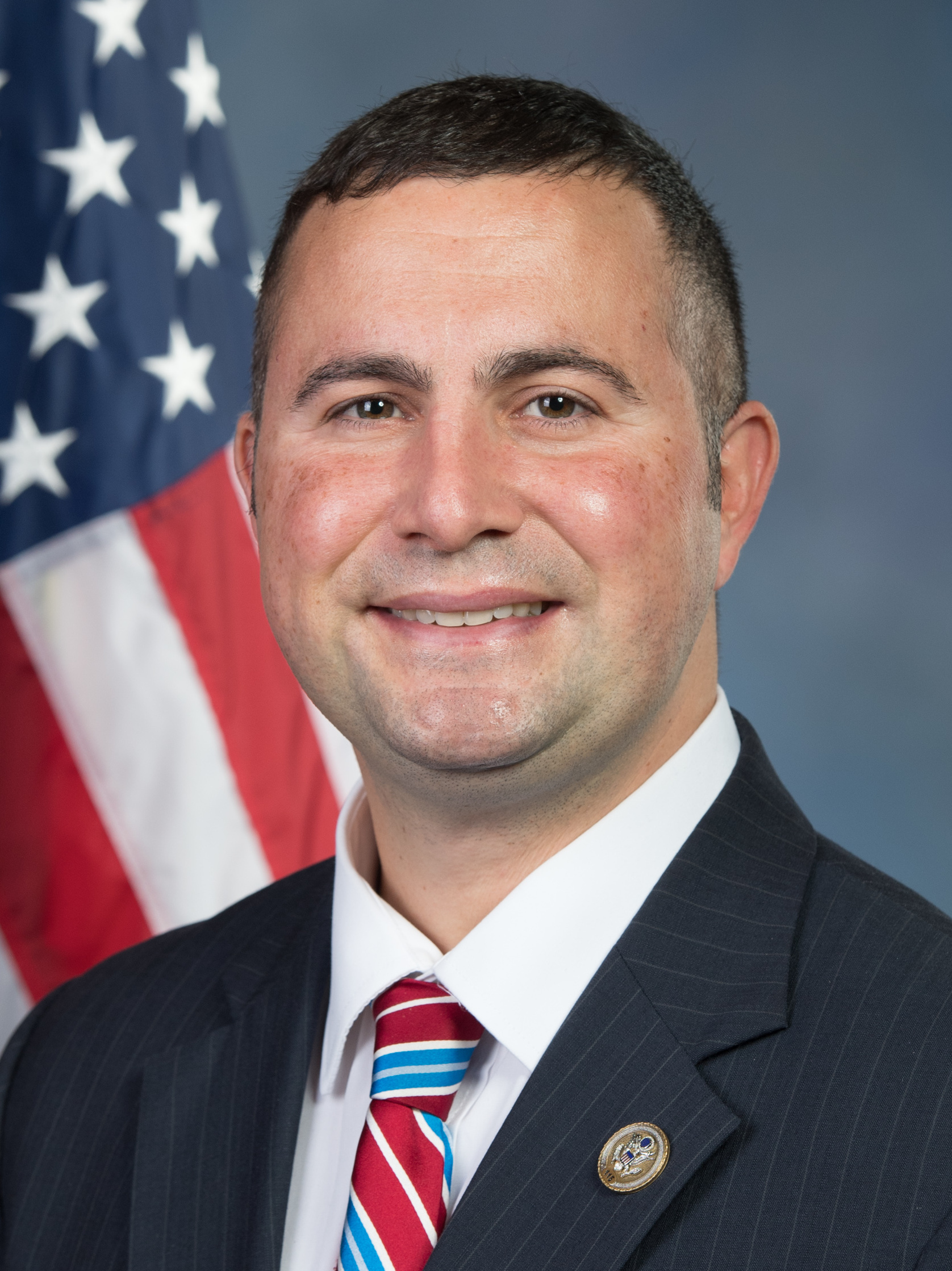

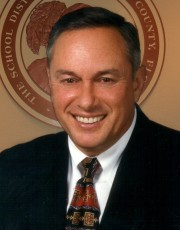
Nominee	Darren Soto	Thomas Chalifoux
Party	Democratic	Republican
Popular vote	178,785	138,076
Percentage	55.1%	42.6%
- County results Soto: 50–60%
U.S. Representative before election
Darren Soto
Democratic
Elected U.S. Representative
Darren Soto
Democratic

The 9th district includes much of Greater Orlando, stretching from eastern Orlando towards Yeehaw Junction and including the cities of Kissimmee and St. Cloud. The incumbent was Democrat Darren Soto, who was re-elected with 53.6% of the vote in 2022.

=== Democratic primary ===
==== Nominee ====
- Darren Soto, incumbent U.S. representative

==== Endorsements ====
Darren Soto

Organizations

- AIPAC
- Democratic Majority for Israel
- Feminist Majority PAC
- League of Conservation Voters
- Pro-Israel America

Labor unions

- Association of Flight Attendants

==== Fundraising ====
Campaign finance reports as of December 31, 2023
Candidate	Raised	Spent	Cash on hand
Darren Soto (D)	$765,779	$283,742	$546,317
Source: Federal Election Commission

=== Republican primary ===
==== Nominee ====
- Thomas Chalifoux, former chair of the Osceola County School Board

==== Eliminated in primary ====
- Jose Castillo, hospitality management professional and candidate for this district in 2020 and 2022
- John Quiñones, former state representative and candidate for this district in 2012

==== Endorsements ====
Thomas Chalifoux

Newspapers

- Orlando Sentinel

==== Fundraising ====
Campaign finance reports as of December 31, 2023
Candidate	Raised	Spent	Cash on hand
John Quiñones (R)	$71,899 (Note: $17,500 of this total was self-funded by Quiñones)	$19,203	$52,696
Source: Federal Election Commission

==== Debate ====
2024 Florida's 9th congressional district Republican primary debate
No.	Date	Host	Moderator	Link	Republican	Republican	Republican
Key: P Participant A Absent N Not invited I Invited W Withdrawn							
Key: P Participant A Absent N Not invited I Invited W Withdrawn					Castillo	Chalifoux	Quiñones
1	Jul. 10, 2024	WESH	Greg Fox	YouTube	P	P	P

==== Results ====
Republican primary results
Party	Candidate	Votes	%
Republican	Thomas Chalifoux	12,662	49.6
Republican	John Quiñones	6,557	25.7
Republican	Jose Castillo	6,294	24.7
Total votes		25,513	100.0

=== Independents ===
==== Declared ====
- Marcus Carter, entrepreneur

=== General election ===
==== Debate ====
2024 Florida's 9th congressional district debate
No.	Date	Host	Moderator	Link	Democratic	Republican	Independent
Key: P Participant A Absent N Not invited I Invited W Withdrawn							
Key: P Participant A Absent N Not invited I Invited W Withdrawn					Soto	Chalifoux	Carter
1	Oct. 4, 2024	WESH	Greg Fox	WESH	P	P	P

==== Predictions ====
Source	Ranking	As of
The Cook Political Report	Likely D	September 7, 2023
Inside Elections	Solid D	May 9, 2024
Sabato's Crystal Ball	Safe D	September 7, 2023
Elections Daily	Safe D	November 4, 2024
CNalysis	Solid D	June 15, 2024

==== Results ====
Florida's 9th congressional district, 2024
Party	Candidate	Votes	%
Democratic	Darren Soto (incumbent)	178,785	55.1
Republican	Thomas Chalifoux	138,076	42.6
Independent	Marcus Carter	7,412	2.3
Total votes		324,273	100.0
Democratic hold			

== District 10 ==
2024 Florida's 10th congressional district election
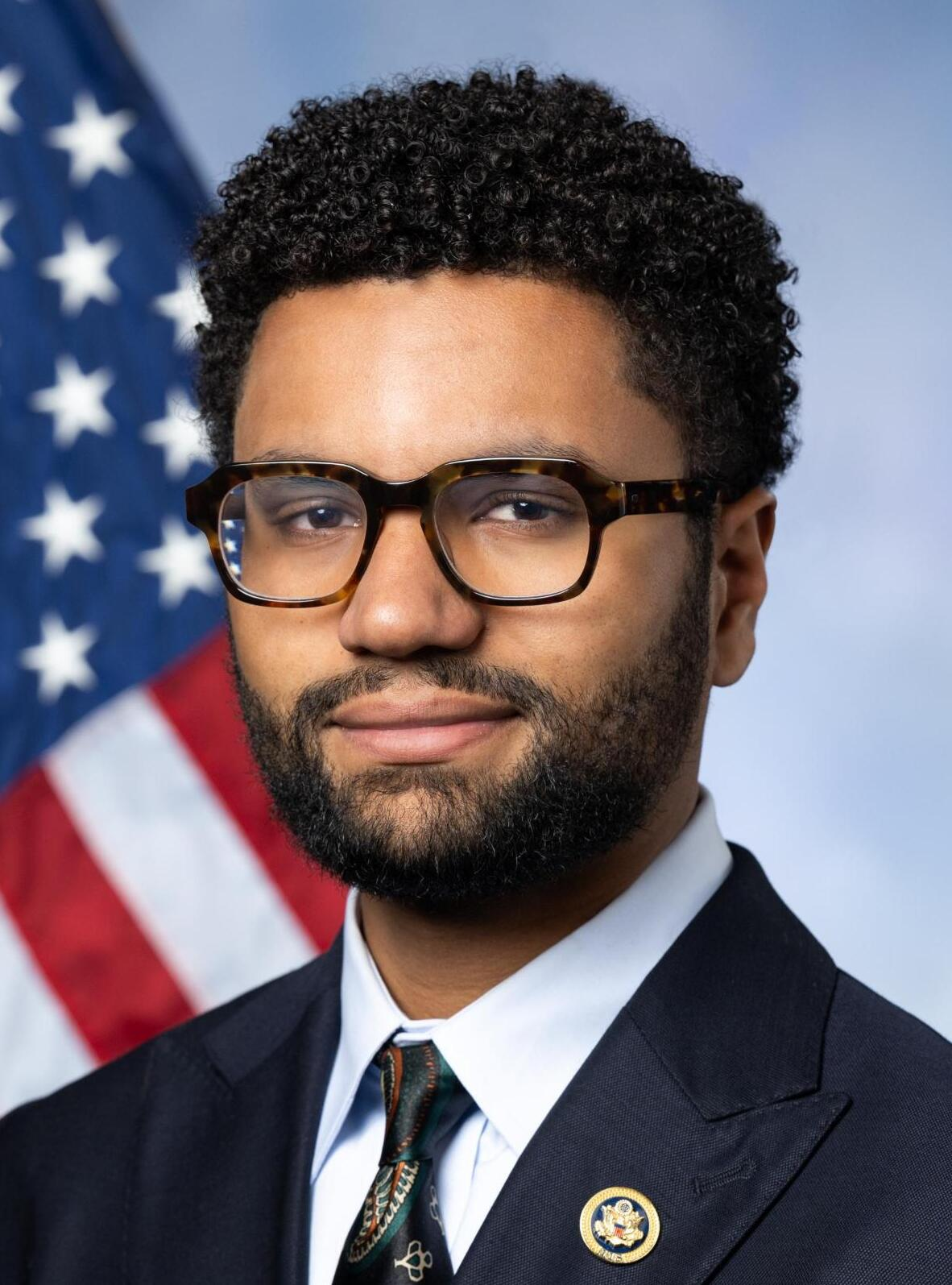

Nominee	Maxwell Frost	Willie Montague
Party	Democratic	Republican
Popular vote	181,455	109,460
Percentage	62.4%	37.6%
- Precinct results Frost: 50–60% 60–70% 70–80% 80–90% >90% Montague: 50–60% 60–70%
U.S. Representative before election
Maxwell Alejandro Frost
Democratic
Elected U.S. Representative
Maxwell Alejandro Frost
Democratic

The incumbent was Democrat Maxwell Alejandro Frost, who was elected with 59% of the vote in 2022.

=== Democratic primary ===
==== Nominee ====
- Maxwell Alejandro Frost, incumbent U.S. representative

==== Eliminated in primary ====
- Wade Darius, marketing firm owner and candidate for this district in 2018
- Issa White, college professor

==== Endorsements ====
Maxwell Alejandro Frost

State legislators

- Anna Eskamani, HD–42 (2018–present)
- Johanna López, HD–43 (2022–present)
- Geraldine Thompson, SD–15 (2022–2025)
- Vic Torres, SD–25 (2016–2024)

Organizations

- Brady PAC
- Everytown for Gun Safety Action Fund
- Friends of the Earth Action
- Peace Action
- Planned Parenthood Action Fund
- Population Connection Action Fund

Labor unions

- Association of Flight Attendants
- National Education Association

==== Fundraising ====
Campaign finance reports as of December 31, 2023
Candidate	Raised	Spent	Cash on hand
Maxwell Frost (D)	$1,816,662	$1,214,679	$935,981
Source: Federal Election Commission

==== Results ====
Democratic primary results by precinct Frost: 50–60%; 60–70%; 70–80%; 80–90%; >90%

Democratic primary results
Party	Candidate	Votes	%
Democratic	Maxwell Alejandro Frost (incumbent)	33,208	81.8
Democratic	Wade Darius	5,106	12.6
Democratic	Issa White	2,295	5.7
Total votes		40,609	100.0

=== Republican primary ===
==== Candidates ====
===== Nominee =====
- Willie Montague, life coach and candidate for this district in 2020 and 2022

===== Eliminated in primary =====
- Tuan Le, cafe owner and candidate for this district in 2022

==== Fundraising ====
Campaign finance reports as of December 31, 2023
Candidate	Raised	Spent	Cash on hand
Willie Montague (R)	$4,249	$3,162	$1,089
Source: Federal Election Commission

==== Debate ====
2024 Florida's 10th congressional district Republican primary debate
No.	Date	Host	Moderator	Link	Republican	Republican
Key: P Participant A Absent N Not invited I Invited W Withdrawn						
Key: P Participant A Absent N Not invited I Invited W Withdrawn					Le	Montague
1	Jul. 17, 2024	WESH	Greg Fox	YouTube	P	P

==== Results ====
Republican primary results
Party	Candidate	Votes	%
Republican	Willie Montague	11,183	53.5
Republican	Tuan Le	9,734	46.5
Total votes		20,917	100.0

=== General election ===
==== Predictions ====
Source	Ranking	As of
The Cook Political Report	Solid D	September 7, 2023
Inside Elections	Solid D	July 28, 2023
Sabato's Crystal Ball	Safe D	September 7, 2023
Elections Daily	Safe D	September 7, 2023
CNalysis	Solid D	November 16, 2023

==== Results ====
Florida's 10th congressional district, 2024
Party	Candidate	Votes	%
Democratic	Maxwell Alejandro Frost (incumbent)	181,455	62.4
Republican	Willie J. Montague	109,460	37.6
Total votes		290,915	100.0
Democratic hold			

== District 11 ==
2024 Florida's 11th congressional district election
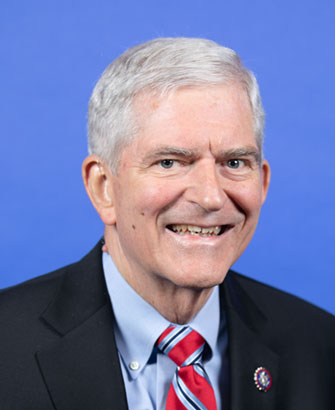

Nominee	Daniel Webster	Barbie Harden Hall
Party	Republican	Democratic
Popular vote	269,277	176,726
Percentage	60.4%	39.6%
- County results Webster: 50–60% 60–70% 70–80%
U.S. Representative before election
Daniel Webster
Republican
Elected U.S. Representative
Daniel Webster
Republican

The 11th district consists of a portion of Central Florida, including the Villages and the western Orlando suburbs. The incumbent was Republican Daniel Webster, who was re-elected with 63.1% of the vote in 2022.

=== Republican primary ===
==== Nominee ====
- Daniel Webster, incumbent U.S. representative

==== Eliminated in primary ====
- John McCloy, geophysicist

==== Withdrawn ====
- Anthony Sabatini, chair of the Lake County Republican Party, former state representative, and candidate for the 7th district in 2022 (ran for Lake County Commission)

==== Endorsements ====
Anthony Sabatini

Organizations

- Gun Owners of America
- Latinos for America First
- Republicans for National Renewal
Daniel Webster

U.S. senators

- Marco Rubio, Florida (2011–2025)
- Rick Scott, Florida (2019–present)

U.S. representatives

- Thomas Massie, KY-04 (2012–present)

Sheriffs

- 3 sheriffs (Note: Bill Farmer, Sumter County sheriff; Peyton Grinnell, Lake County sheriff; Grady Judd, Polk County sheriff)

Organizations

- AIPAC

==== Fundraising ====
Campaign finance reports as of December 31, 2023
Candidate	Raised	Spent	Cash on hand
John McCloy (R)	$78,376 (Note: $49,900 of this total was self-funded by McCloy)	$57,074	$21,302
Anthony Sabatini (R)	$287,196	$125,800	$161,931
Daniel Webster (R)	$513,188	$222,123	$518,936
Source: Federal Election Commission

==== Polling ====
Poll source	Date(s) administered	Sample size	Margin of error	Anthony Sabatini	Daniel Webster	Other/ undecided
RMG Research (Note: Poll sponsored by U.S. Term Limits, which supports Sabatini)	November 14–19, 2023	300 (LV)	?	29%	35%	36% (Note: The poll's sponsor only revealed the numbers for Sabatini and Webster, and did not explain how the remaining 36% of respondents answered.)

==== Results ====
Republican primary results
Party	Candidate	Votes	%
Republican	Daniel Webster (incumbent)	55,443	77.0
Republican	John McCloy	16,567	23.0
Total votes		72,010	100.0

=== Democratic primary ===
==== Nominee ====
- Barbie Harden Hall, paralegal

=== General election ===
==== Predictions ====
Source	Ranking	As of
The Cook Political Report	Solid R	September 7, 2023
Inside Elections	Solid R	July 28, 2023
Sabato's Crystal Ball	Safe R	September 7, 2023
Elections Daily	Safe R	September 7, 2023
CNalysis	Solid R	November 16, 2023

==== Results ====
Florida's 11th congressional district, 2024
Party	Candidate	Votes	%
Republican	Daniel Webster (incumbent)	269,277	60.4
Democratic	Barbie Harden Hall	176,726	39.6
Total votes		446,003	100.0
Republican hold			

== District 12 ==
2024 Florida's 12th congressional district election
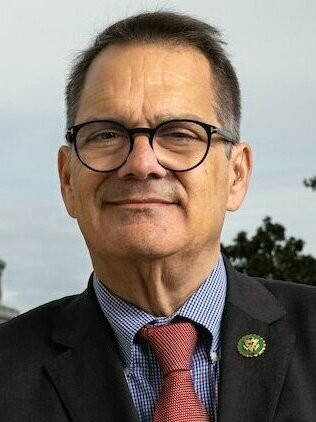

Nominee	Gus Bilirakis	Rock Aboujaoude Jr.
Party	Republican	Democratic
Popular vote	306,487	124,949
Percentage	71.0%	29.0%
- County results Bilirakis: 60–70% 70–80%
U.S. Representative before election
Gus Bilirakis
Republican
Elected U.S. Representative
Gus Bilirakis
Republican

The incumbent was Republican Gus Bilirakis, who was re-elected with 70.4% of the vote in 2022.

=== Republican primary ===
==== Nominee ====
- Gus Bilirakis, incumbent U.S. representative

==== Eliminated in primary ====
- Hank Dunlap, blue collar worker

==== Endorsements ====
Gus Bilirakis

U.S. presidents

- Donald Trump, former president of the United States and president-elect of the United States (2017–2021)

U.S. representatives

- Byron Donalds, U.S. representative from Florida's 19th congressional district (2021–present)
- Matt Gaetz, U.S. representative from Florida's 1st congressional district (2017–present)
- Jim Jordan, U.S. representative from Ohio's 4th congressional district (2007–present)
- Anna Paulina Luna, U.S. representative from Florida (2023–present)

Sheriffs

- Al Nienhius, Hernando County sheriff
- Chris Nocco, Pasco County sheriff
- Mike Prendergast, Citrus County sheriff

Newspapers

- Tampa Bay Times (primary only)

Organizations

- AIPAC

==== Fundraising ====
Campaign finance reports as of December 31, 2023
Candidate	Raised	Spent	Cash on hand
Gus Bilirakis (R)	$840,984	$522,808	$461,273
Source: Federal Election Commission

==== Results ====
Republican primary results
Party	Candidate	Votes	%
Republican	Gus Bilirakis (incumbent)	59,946	84.3
Republican	Hank Dunlap	11,182	15.7
Total votes		71,128	100.0

=== Democratic primary ===
==== Nominee ====
- Rock Aboujaoude Jr., graduate student

=== General election ===
==== Predictions ====
Source	Ranking	As of
The Cook Political Report	Solid R	September 7, 2023
Inside Elections	Solid R	July 28, 2023
Sabato's Crystal Ball	Safe R	September 7, 2023
Elections Daily	Safe R	September 7, 2023
CNalysis	Solid R	November 16, 2023

==== Results ====
Florida's 12th congressional district, 2024
Party	Candidate	Votes	%
Republican	Gus Bilirakis (incumbent)	306,487	71.0
Democratic	Rock Aboujaoude Jr.	124,949	29.0
Total votes		431,436	100.0
Republican hold			

== District 13 ==
2024 Florida's 13th congressional district election
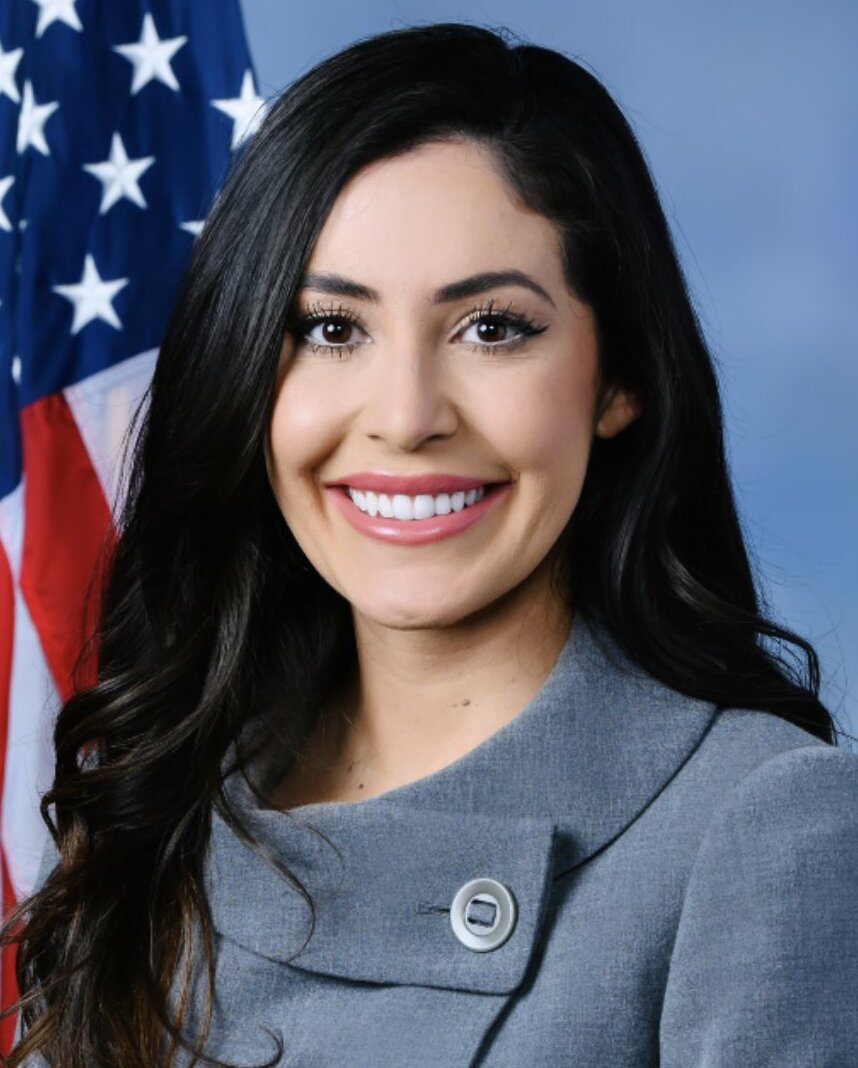

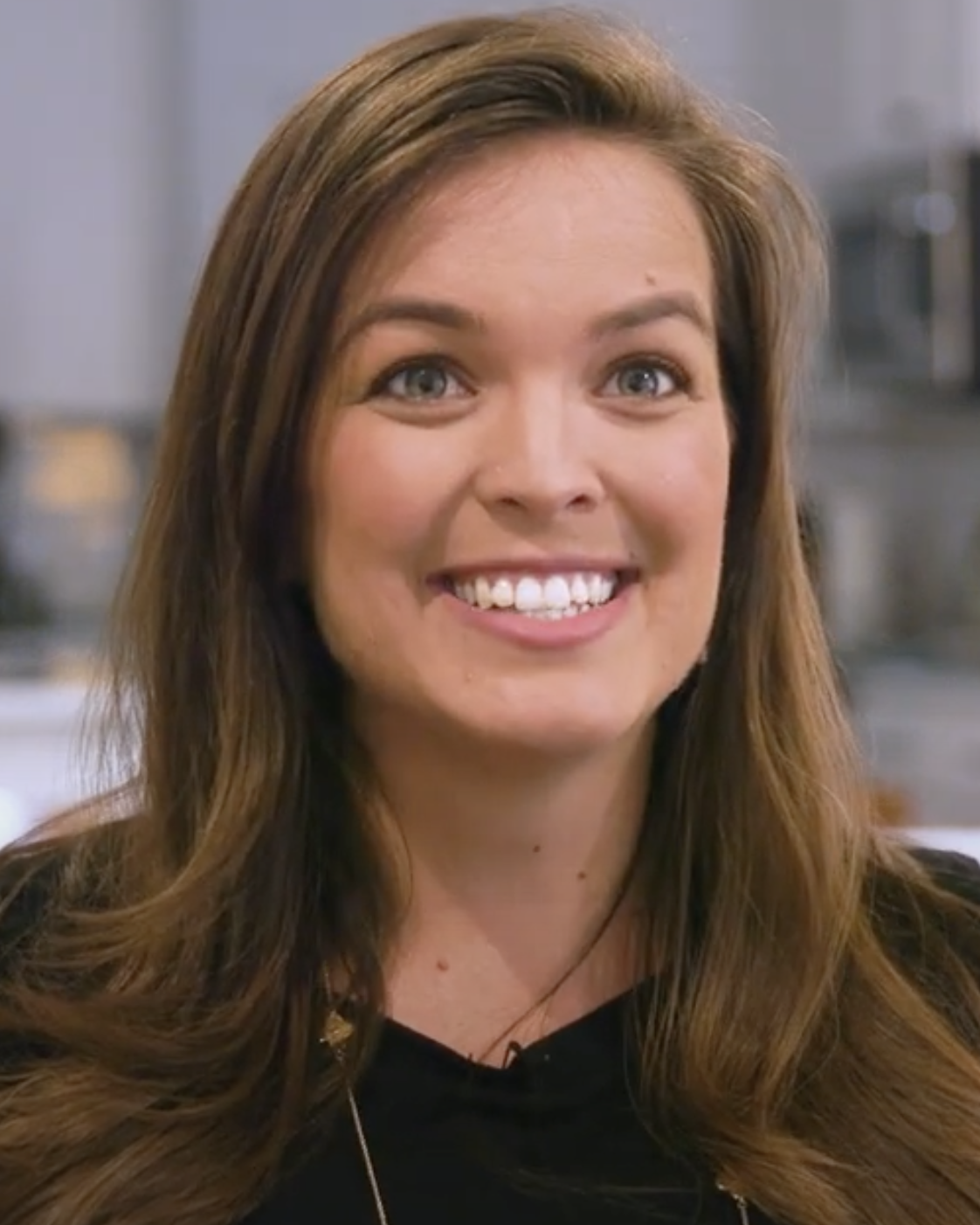
Nominee	Anna Paulina Luna	Whitney Fox
Party	Republican	Democratic
Popular vote	225,636	185,930
Percentage	54.8%	45.2%
- Precinct results Luna: 40–50% 50–60% 60–70% 70–80% 80–90% >90% Fox: 40–50% 50–60% 60–70% 70–80% 80–90% Tie
U.S. Representative before election
Anna Paulina Luna
Republican
Elected U.S. Representative
Anna Paulina Luna
Republican

The 13th district includes most of Pinellas County, including the cities of Largo, Clearwater, and Palm Harbor, as well as a western portion of St. Petersburg. The incumbent was Republican Anna Paulina Luna, who flipped the district and was elected with 53.1% of the vote in 2022.

=== Republican primary ===
==== Nominee ====
- Anna Paulina Luna, incumbent U.S. representative

==== Endorsements ====
Anna Paulina Luna

Federal officials

- Donald Trump, former president of the United States and president-elect of the United States

Organizations

- AIPAC
- Latinos for America First
- Turning Point Action

==== Fundraising ====
Campaign finance reports as of December 31, 2023
Candidate	Raised	Spent	Cash on hand
Anna Paulina Luna (R)	$1,122,274	$617,143	$549,966
Source: Federal Election Commission

=== Democratic primary ===
==== Nominee ====
- Whitney Fox, former director of communications and marketing for the Pinellas Suncoast Transit Authority

==== Eliminated in primary ====
- Sabrina Bousbar, former senior advisor to the Administration for Strategic Preparedness and Response
- Liz Dahan, communications professional
- John Liccione, electrical engineer
- Mark Weinkrantz, retired pilot

==== Declined ====
- Ben Diamond, former state representative (2016–2022) and candidate for this district in 2022 (endorsed Fox)

==== Endorsements ====
Sabrina Bousbar

State legislators

- Joe Geller, state representative
- Christine Hunschofsky, state representative

Organizations

- Harvard College Democrats
- Latino Victory Fund
Whitney Fox

U.S. representatives

- Nikki Budzinski, IL-13 (2023–present)
- Kathy Castor, FL-14 (Note: Numbered as the 11th from 2007–2013) (2007–present)
- Lois Frankel, FL-22 (2013–present)
- Debbie Mucarsel-Powell, FL-26 (2019–2021)
- Stephanie Murphy, FL-07 (2017–2023)
- Brittany Pettersen, CO-7 (2023–present)
- Deborah Ross, NC-2 (2021–present)
- Eric Swalwell, CA-14 (Note: Numbered as the 15th from 2013–2023) (2013–present)
- Debbie Wasserman Schultz, FL-25 (Note: Numbered as the 20th from 2005–2013 and as the 23rd from 2013–2023) (2005–present)

Statewide officials

- Betty Castor, former education commissioner of Florida (1987–1994)
- Alex Sink, former chief financial officer of Florida (2007–2011)

State legislators

- Lindsay Cross, state representative (2022–present)
- Janet Cruz, former state senator (2018–2022)
- Tracie Davis, state senator (2022–present)
- Ben Diamond, former state representative (2016–2022)
- Margaret Good, former state representative (2018–2020)
- Adam Hattersley, former state representative (2018–2020)
- Michele Rayner, state representative (2020–present)
- Carlos Guillermo Smith, former state representative (2016–2022)

Local officials

- Rick Kriseman, former mayor of St. Petersburg (2014–2022)

Individuals

- Alan Cohn, Peabody Award-winning journalist
- Fred Guttenberg, gun control activist
- Amy McGrath, retired U.S. Marine Corps lieutenant colonel and Democratic nominee in the 2020 United States Senate election in Kentucky

Newspapers

- Tampa Bay Times (primary only)

Organizations

- Blue Dog PAC
- EMILY's List
- National Women's Political Caucus
- Planned Parenthood Action Fund

Labor unions

- Service Employees International Union Florida

==== Fundraising ====
Campaign finance reports as of December 31, 2023
Candidate	Raised	Spent	Cash on hand
Whitney Fox (D)	$204,077 (Note: $5,246 of this total was self-funded by Fox)	$52,907	$151,169
John Liccione (D)	$24,333 (Note: $17,837 of this total was self-funded by Liccione)	$18,460	$5,872
Mark Weinkrantz (D)	$43,791 (Note: $20,000 of this total was self-funded by Weinkrantz)	$19,614	$24,176
Source: Federal Election Commission

==== Debate ====
2024 Florida's 13th congressional district Democratic primary debate
No.	Date	Host	Moderator	Link	Democratic	Democratic	Democratic	Democratic
Key: P Participant A Absent N Not invited I Invited W Withdrawn								
Key: P Participant A Absent N Not invited I Invited W Withdrawn					Sabrina Bousbar	Liz Dahan	Whitney Fox	Mark Weinkrantz
1	Jul. 13, 2024	Pinellas County Democratic Party	Rob Lorei	YouTube	P	P	P	P

==== Results ====
Democratic primary results by precinct Map legend: Fox–40–50%; Fox–50–60%; Fox–60–70%; Fox–70–80%; Fox–>90%; No votes

Democratic primary results
Party	Candidate	Votes	%
Democratic	Whitney Fox	29,678	57.9
Democratic	Sabrina Bousbar	8,929	17.4
Democratic	Liz Dahan	6,904	13.5
Democratic	Mark Weinkrantz	3,697	7.2
Democratic	John Liccione	2,013	3.9
Total votes		51,221	100.0

=== General election ===
==== Predictions ====
Source	Ranking	As of
The Cook Political Report	Likely R	September 7, 2023
Elections Daily	Lean R	October 25, 2024
Inside Elections	Likely R	October 31, 2024
Sabato's Crystal Ball	Likely R	October 24, 2024
CNalysis	Likely R	November 16, 2023

==== Polling ====
Poll source	Date(s) administered	Sample size	Margin of error	Anna Paulina Luna (R)	Whitney Fox (D)	Undecided
St. Pete Polls (Note: Poll sponsored by Voting Trend and The Florida Squeeze)	October 20, 2024	905 (LV)	± 3.3%	46%	46%	8%
WPA Intelligence (Note: Poll sponsored by Club for Growth)	October 6–7, 2024	403 (LV)	± 4.9%	51%	45%	5%
WPA Intelligence	August 28–29, 2024	400 (LV)	± 4.9%	48%	43%	10%
St. Pete Polls (Note: Poll sponsored by Florida Politics)	August 27, 2024	843 (LV)	± 3.4%	44%	48%	8%
	August 20, 2024	Primary elections held				
GQR Research (D) (Note: Poll sponsored by Fox's campaign)	May 14–20, 2024	401 (V)	± 4.9%	50%	43%	7%

==== Results ====
Florida's 13th congressional district, 2024
Party	Candidate	Votes	%
Republican	Anna Paulina Luna (incumbent)	225,636	54.8
Democratic	Whitney Fox	185,930	45.2
Write-In	Tony D'Arrigo	27	0.0
Total votes		411,593	100.0
Republican hold			

== District 14 ==
2024 Florida's 14th congressional district election
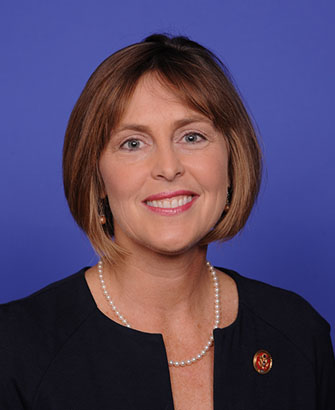

Nominee	Kathy Castor	Robert Rochford
Party	Democratic	Republican
Popular vote	199,423	145,643
Percentage	56.9%	41.6%
- Castor: 40–50% 50–60% 60–70% 70–80% 80–90% >90% Rochford: 40–50% 50–60% 60–70% 70–80% 80–90% >90%
U.S. Representative before election
Kathy Castor
Democratic
Elected U.S. Representative
Kathy Castor
Democratic

The 14th district is based in western Hillsborough County and southeastern Pinellas County, including most of Tampa and some of St. Petersburg. The incumbent was Democrat Kathy Castor, who was re-elected with 56.9% of the vote in 2022.

=== Democratic primary ===
==== Nominee ====
- Kathy Castor, incumbent U.S. representative

==== Endorsements ====
Kathy Castor

Organizations

- AIPAC
- Democratic Majority for Israel
- Giffords
- League of Conservation Voters
- Natural Resources Defense Council

Labor unions

- National Education Association

==== Fundraising ====
Campaign finance reports as of December 31, 2023
Candidate	Raised	Spent	Cash on hand
Kathy Castor (D)	$503,808	$296,511	$558,267
Source: Federal Election Commission

=== Republican primary ===
==== Nominee ====
- Robert Rochford, retired U.S. Navy captain

==== Eliminated in primary ====
- Ehsan Joarder, IT specialist
- Neelam Taneja Perry, physician
- John Peters, carpet cleaning franchise owner

==== Endorsements ====
Robert Rochford

Organizations

- Log Cabin Republicans PAC
Ehsan Joarder

Newspapers

- Tampa Bay Times (primary only)

==== Fundraising ====
Campaign finance reports as of December 31, 2023
Candidate	Raised	Spent	Cash on hand
John Peters (R)	$13,666 (Note: $8,785 of this total was self-funded by Peters)	$8,702	$4,963
Neelam Taneja Perry (R)	$2,040 (Note: $2,000 of this total was self-funded by Perry)	$2,040	$0
Robert Rochford (R)	$10,605	$7,220	$3,384
Source: Federal Election Commission

==== Results ====
Republican primary results
Party	Candidate	Votes	%
Republican	Robert Rochford	15,575	54.1
Republican	John Peters	7,771	27.0
Republican	Ehsan Joarder	3,837	13.3
Republican	Neelam Taneja Perry	1,594	5.5
Total votes		28,777	100.0

=== Libertarian primary ===
==== Candidates ====
===== Nominee =====
- Nathaniel Snyder, mechanic

=== General election ===
==== Predictions ====
Source	Ranking	As of
The Cook Political Report	Solid D	September 7, 2023
Inside Elections	Solid D	July 28, 2023
Sabato's Crystal Ball	Safe D	September 7, 2023
Elections Daily	Safe D	September 7, 2023
CNalysis	Solid D	November 16, 2023

==== Results ====
Florida's 14th congressional district, 2024
Party	Candidate	Votes	%
Democratic	Kathy Castor (incumbent)	199,423	56.9
Republican	Robert Rochford	145,643	41.6
Nonpartisan	Christopher Bradley	2,595	0.7
Libertarian	Nathaniel Snyder	2,524	0.7
Total votes		350,185	100.0
Democratic hold			

== District 15 ==
2024 Florida's 15th congressional district election
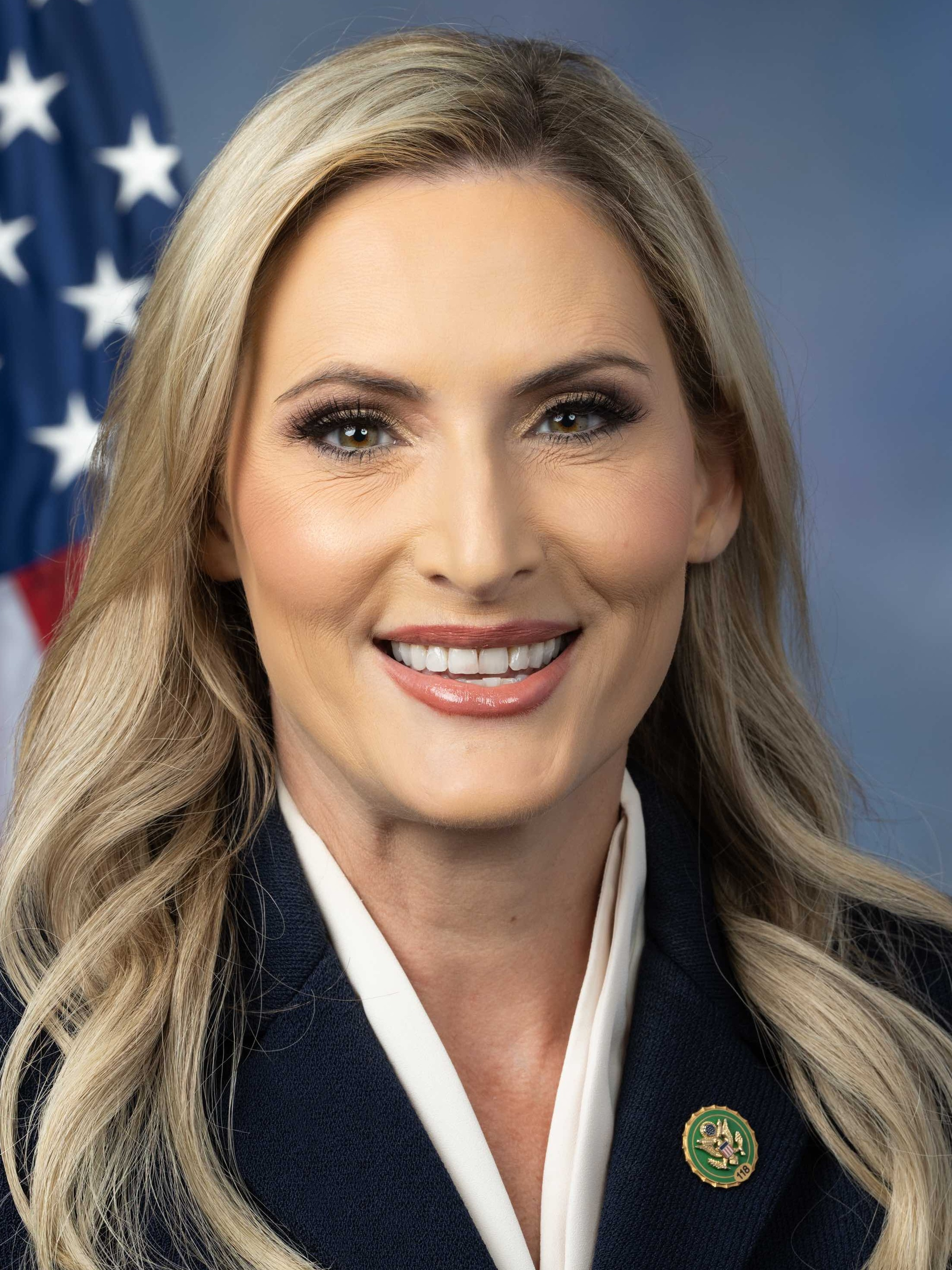

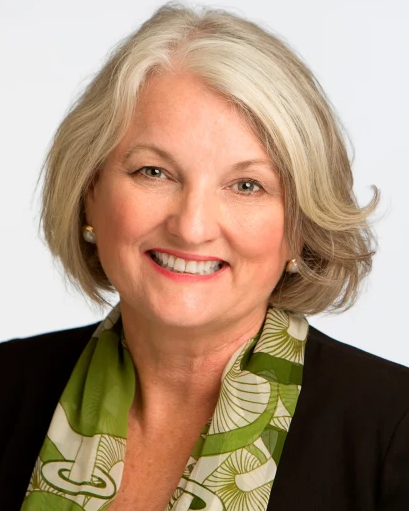
Nominee	Laurel Lee	Pat Kemp
Party	Republican	Democratic
Popular vote	195,334	152,361
Percentage	56.2%	43.8%
- County results Lee: 50–60% 60–70%
U.S. Representative before election
Laurel Lee
Republican
Elected U.S. Representative
Laurel Lee
Republican

The incumbent was Republican Laurel Lee, who was elected with 58.5% of the vote in 2022.

=== Republican primary ===
On March 25, former president Donald Trump called for someone to mount a primary challenge to Lee; he did not explain why he thought that Lee should be ousted. Media sources pointed out that Lee had endorsed Ron DeSantis for president and had recently voted for a controversial spending package that the Freedom Caucus opposed. However, Trump would later endorse Lee for re-election.

==== Nominee ====
- Laurel Lee, incumbent U.S. representative

==== Eliminated in primary ====
- Jennifer Barbosa, paralegal and independent candidate for California's 28th congressional district in 2020
- James Judge, public relations firm owner, U.S. Coast Guard veteran, and nominee for the 14th district in 2022

==== Declined ====
- Laura Loomer, InfoWars contributor, candidate for the 11th district in 2022, and nominee for the 21st district in 2020
- Rogan O'Handley, attorney and internet personality
- Jackie Toledo, former state representative and candidate for this district in 2022

==== Endorsements ====
James Judge

U.S. representatives

- Steve King, former U.S. representative from Iowa's 4th congressional district
- Ted Yoho, former U.S. representative from Florida's 3rd congressional district

Individuals

- Roger Stone, political consultant

Organizations

- Republican Liberty Caucus
Laurel Lee

Federal officials

- Donald Trump, former president of the United States and president-elect of the United States

U.S. senators

- Marco Rubio, U.S. senator from Florida
- Rick Scott, U.S. senator from Florida

Statewide officials

- Ron DeSantis, governor of Florida

Newspapers

- Tampa Bay Times (primary only)

Organizations

- AIPAC
- Maggie's List
- U.S. Chamber of Commerce

==== Fundraising ====
Campaign finance reports as of December 31, 2023
Candidate	Raised	Spent	Cash on hand
Laurel Lee (R)	$581,958	$230,980	$438,217
Source: Federal Election Commission

==== Results ====
Republican primary results
Party	Candidate	Votes	%
Republican	Laurel Lee (incumbent)	28,571	72.3
Republican	James Judge	7,137	18.1
Republican	Jennifer Barbosa	3,809	9.6
Total votes		39,517	100.0

=== Democratic primary ===
==== Nominee ====
- Pat Kemp, at-large Hillsborough County commissioner

==== Fundraising ====
Campaign finance reports as of December 31, 2023
Candidate	Raised	Spent	Cash on hand
Kris Fitzgerald (D)	$17,132	$13,818	$3,314
Source: Federal Election Commission

=== General election ===
==== Predictions ====
Source	Ranking	As of
The Cook Political Report	Solid R	September 7, 2023
Inside Elections	Solid R	July 28, 2023
Sabato's Crystal Ball	Safe R	September 7, 2023
Elections Daily	Safe R	November 4, 2024
CNalysis	Very Likely R	August 18, 2024

==== Polling ====
Poll source	Date(s) administered	Sample size	Margin of error	Laurel Lee (R)	Pat Kemp (D)	Undecided
Change Research (D) (Note: Poll sponsored by Kemp's campaign)	July 17–19, 2024	511 (LV)	± 4.9%	44%	41%	14%

==== Post-primary endorsements ====
Laurel Lee

Sheriffs

- Chad Chronister, Hillborough County sheriff
- Grady Judd, Polk County sheriff
- Chris Nocco, Hernando County sheriff

Organizations

- National Federation of Independent Business

==== Results ====
Florida's 15th congressional district, 2024
Party	Candidate	Votes	%
Republican	Laurel Lee (incumbent)	195,334	56.2
Democratic	Pat Kemp	152,361	43.8
Total votes		347,695	100.0
Republican hold			

== District 16 ==
2024 Florida's 16th congressional district election
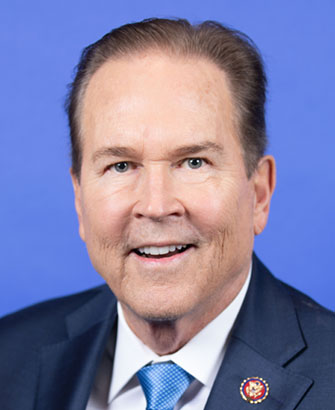

Nominee	Vern Buchanan	Jan Schneider
Party	Republican	Democratic
Popular vote	247,516	168,625
Percentage	59.5%	40.5%
- County results Buchanan: 50–60% 60–70%
U.S. Representative before election
Vern Buchanan
Republican
Elected U.S. Representative
Vern Buchanan
Republican

The 16th district encompasses Manatee County and eastern Hillsborough County, taking in Tampa's eastern suburbs, including Riverview and parts of Brandon. The incumbent was Republican Vern Buchanan, who was re-elected with 62.2% of the vote in 2022.

=== Republican primary ===
==== Nominee ====
- Vern Buchanan, incumbent U.S. representative

==== Eliminated in primary ====
- Eddie Speir, private school founder and former New College of Florida trustee

==== Declined ====
- Jim Boyd, state senator

==== Endorsements ====
Vern Buchanan

Federal officials

- Donald Trump, former president of the United States and president-elect of the United States

U.S. representatives

- Byron Donalds, FL-19 (2021–present)
- Matt Gaetz, FL-01 (2017–present)

Sheriffs

- Chad Chronister, Hillsborough County sheriff
- Rick Wells, Manatee County sheriff

Newspapers

- Tampa Bay Times (primary only)

Organizations

- AIPAC
- U.S. Chamber of Commerce (post-primary)

==== Fundraising ====
Campaign finance reports as of December 31, 2023
Candidate	Raised	Spent	Cash on hand
Vern Buchanan (R)	$868,237	$667,317	$1,584,270
Eddie Speir (R)	$522,328 (Note: $501,000 of this total was self-funded by Speir)	$93,261	$427,152
Source: Federal Election Commission

==== Polling ====
Poll source	Date(s) administered	Sample size	Margin of error	Vern Buchanan	Eddie Speir	Other/ undecided
St. Pete Polls	April 3, 2024	431 (LV)	± 4.7%	64%	13%	23%

==== Results ====
Republican primary results by county Map legend: Buchanan–60–70%

Republican primary results
Party	Candidate	Votes	%
Republican	Vern Buchanan (incumbent)	38,789	60.9
Republican	Eddie Speir	24,868	39.1
Total votes		63,657	100.0

=== Democratic primary ===
==== Nominee ====
- Jan Schneider, attorney, perennial candidate, and nominee for this district in 2016 and 2022

==== Eliminated in primary ====
- Trent Miller, attorney

==== Endorsements ====
Trent Miller

Newspapers

- Tampa Bay Times (primary only)

==== Results ====
Democratic primary results
Party	Candidate	Votes	%
Democratic	Jan Schneider	23,701	65.7
Democratic	Trent Miller	12,395	34.3
Total votes		36,096	100.0

=== General election ===
==== Predictions ====
Source	Ranking	As of
The Cook Political Report	Solid R	September 7, 2023
Inside Elections	Solid R	July 28, 2023
Sabato's Crystal Ball	Safe R	September 7, 2023
Elections Daily	Safe R	September 7, 2023
CNalysis	Solid R	November 16, 2023

==== Results ====
Florida's 16th congressional district, 2024
Party	Candidate	Votes	%
Republican	Vern Buchanan (incumbent)	247,516	59.5
Democratic	Jan Schneider	168,625	40.5
Total votes		416,141	100.0
Republican hold			

== District 17 ==
2024 Florida's 17th congressional district election
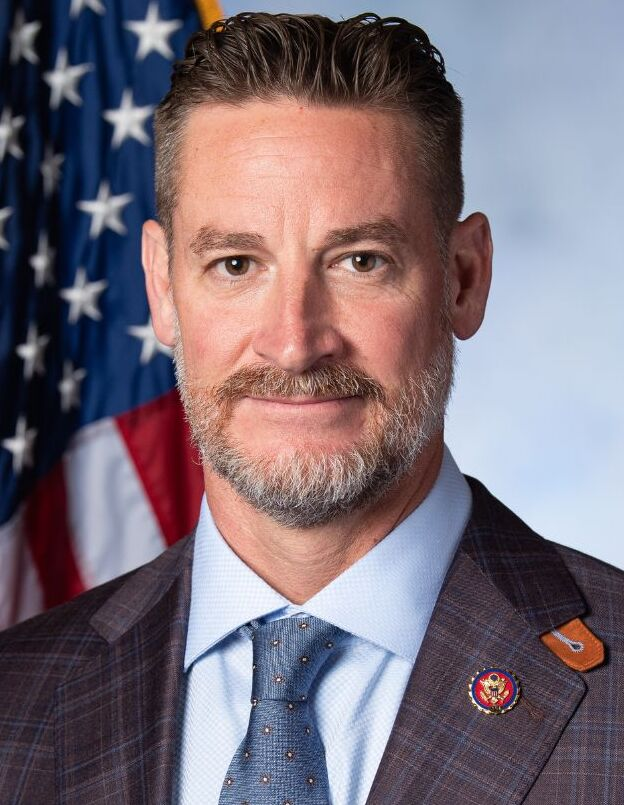

Nominee	Greg Steube	Manny Lopez
Party	Republican	Democratic
Popular vote	291,347	164,566
Percentage	63.9%	36.1%
- County results Steube: 60–70%
U.S. Representative before election
Greg Steube
Republican
Elected U.S. Representative
Greg Steube
Republican

The incumbent was Republican Greg Steube, who was re-elected with 63.8% of the vote in 2022.

=== Republican primary ===
==== Nominee ====
- Greg Steube, incumbent U.S. representative

==== Endorsements ====
Greg Steube

Federal officials

- Donald Trump, former president of the United States and president-elect of the United States

Organizations

- AIPAC

==== Fundraising ====
Campaign finance reports as of December 31, 2023
Candidate	Raised	Spent	Cash on hand
Greg Steube (R)	$774,646	$541,655	$1,200,404
Source: Federal Election Commission

=== Democratic primary ===
==== Nominee ====
- Manny Lopez, realtor

==== Eliminated in primary ====
- Matthew Montavon, retired United Nations official

==== Withdrawn ====
- Andrea Doria Kale, retired tech professional and nominee for this district in 2022 (ran in the 18th district)

==== Results ====
Democratic primary results
Party	Candidate	Votes	%
Democratic	Manny Lopez	25,017	52.9
Democratic	Matthew Montavon	22,244	47.1
Total votes		47,261	100.0

=== General election ===
==== Write-in ====
- Ralph Hartman

==== Predictions ====
Source	Ranking	As of
The Cook Political Report	Solid R	September 7, 2023
Inside Elections	Solid R	July 28, 2023
Sabato's Crystal Ball	Safe R	September 7, 2023
Elections Daily	Safe R	September 7, 2023
CNalysis	Solid R	November 16, 2023

==== Results ====
Florida's 17th congressional district, 2024
Party	Candidate	Votes	%
Republican	Greg Steube (incumbent)	291,347	63.9
Democratic	Manny Lopez	164,566	36.1
Write-in	Ralph Hartman	8	0.0
Total votes		455,921	100.0
Republican hold			

== District 18 ==
2024 Florida's 18th congressional district election
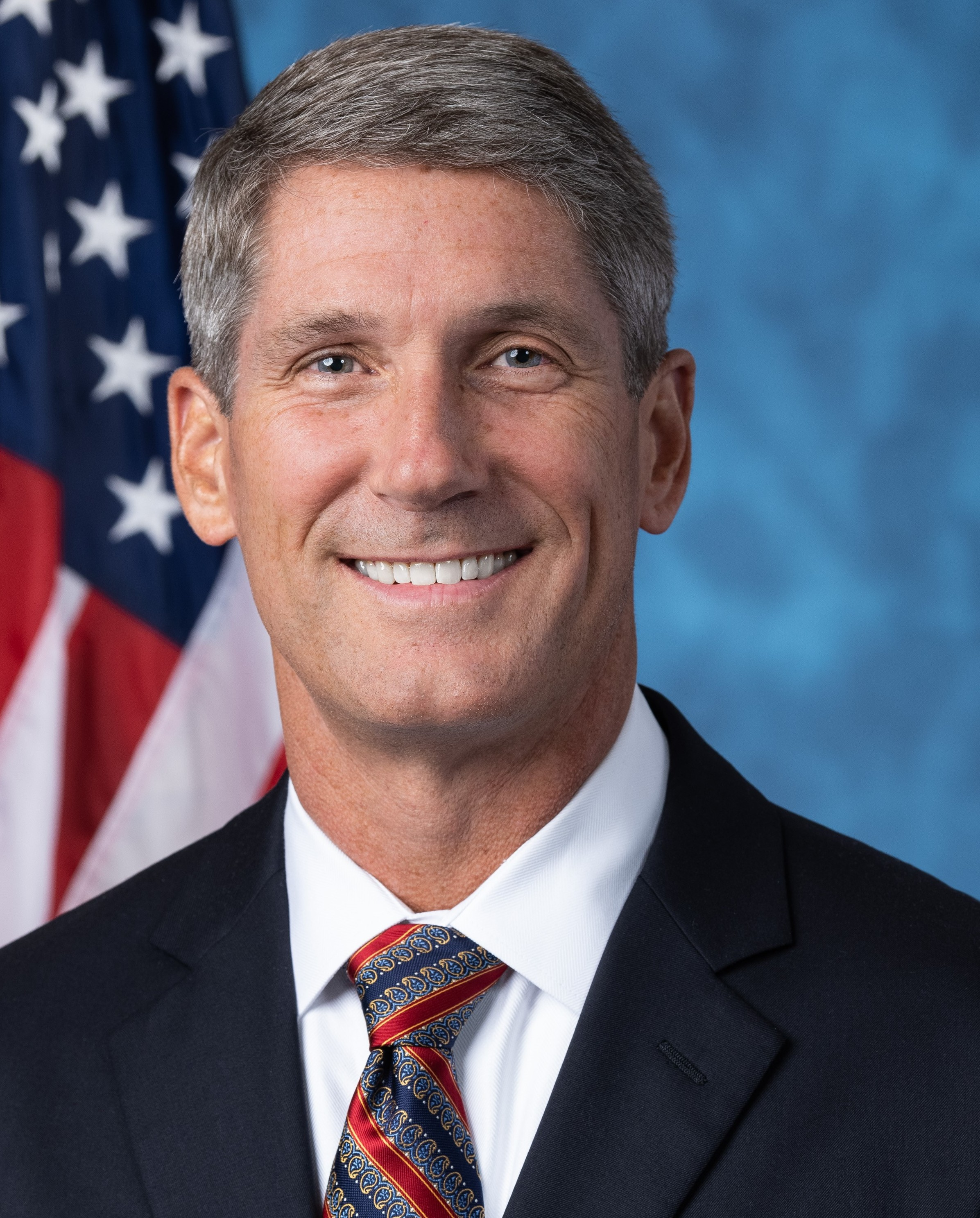

Nominee	Scott Franklin	Andrea Doria Kale
Party	Republican	Democratic
Popular vote	225,170	119,637
Percentage	65.3%	34.7%
- County results Franklin: 60–70% 70–80% Kale: 60–70%
U.S. Representative before election
Scott Franklin
Republican
Elected U.S. Representative
Scott Franklin
Republican

The incumbent was Republican Scott Franklin, who was re-elected with 74.7% of the vote in 2022.

=== Republican primary ===
==== Nominee ====
- Scott Franklin, incumbent U.S. representative

==== Endorsements ====
Scott Franklin

Federal officials

- Donald Trump, former president of the United States and president-elect of the United States

Organizations

- AIPAC

==== Fundraising ====
Campaign finance reports as of December 31, 2023
Candidate	Raised	Spent	Cash on hand
Scott Franklin (R)	$377,663	$161,493	$568,945
Source: Federal Election Commission

=== Democratic primary ===
==== Nominee ====
- Andrea Doria Kale, retired tech professional and nominee for the 17th district in 2022

==== Eliminated in primary ====
- Peter Braunston, tech support specialist

==== Results ====
Democratic primary results
Party	Candidate	Votes	%
Democratic	Andrea Doria Kale	16,778	66.9
Democratic	Peter Braunston	8,291	33.1
Total votes		25,069	100.0

=== General election ===
==== Predictions ====
Source	Ranking	As of
The Cook Political Report	Solid R	September 7, 2023
Inside Elections	Solid R	July 28, 2023
Sabato's Crystal Ball	Safe R	September 7, 2023
Elections Daily	Safe R	September 7, 2023
CNalysis	Solid R	November 16, 2023

==== Results ====
Florida's 18th congressional district, 2024
Party	Candidate	Votes	%
Republican	Scott Franklin (incumbent)	225,170	65.3
Democratic	Andrea Doria Kale	119,637	34.7
Total votes		344,807	100.0
Republican hold			

== District 19 ==
2024 Florida's 19th congressional district election
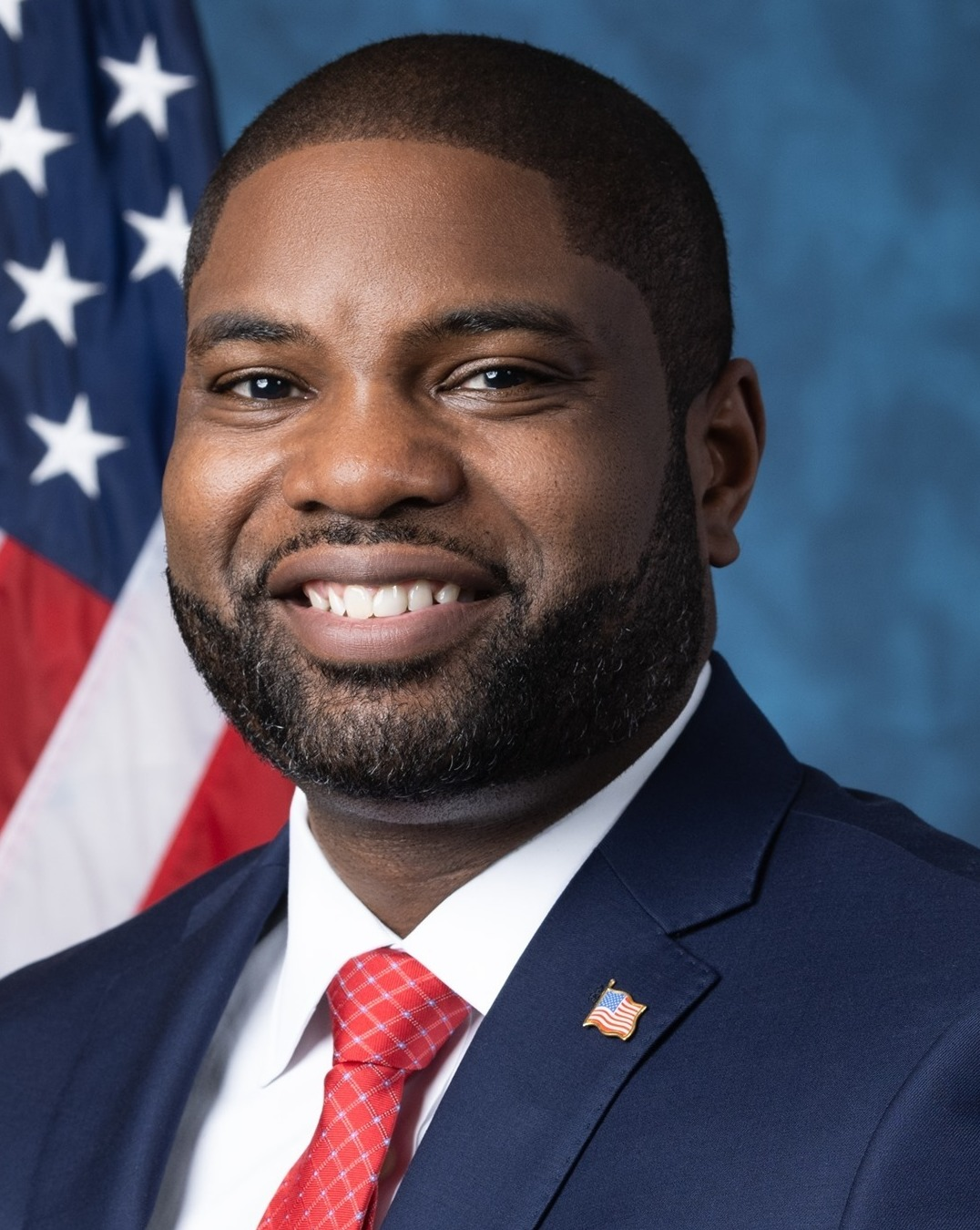

Nominee	Byron Donalds	Kari Lerner
Party	Republican	Democratic
Popular vote	275,708	140,038
Percentage	66.3%	33.7%
- County results Donalds: 60–70%
U.S. Representative before election
Byron Donalds
Republican
Elected U.S. Representative
Byron Donalds
Republican

The 19th district includes the cities of Cape Coral, Fort Myers, Bonita Springs and Naples. The incumbent was Republican Byron Donalds, who was re-elected with 68.0% of the vote in 2022.

=== Republican primary ===
==== Nominee ====
- Byron Donalds, incumbent U.S. representative

==== Declined ====
- Chris Collins, former U.S. representative from New York's 27th congressional district (2013–2019) and former Erie County, New York executive (2008–2011)

==== Endorsements ====
Byron Donalds

Federal officials

- Donald Trump, former president of the United States and president-elect of the United States

Organizations

- AIPAC
- College Republicans of America

==== Fundraising ====
Campaign finance reports as of December 31, 2023
Candidate	Raised	Spent	Cash on hand
Byron Donalds (R)	$2,321,535	$2,142,959	$916,567
Source: Federal Election Commission

=== Democratic primary ===
==== Nominee ====
- Kari Lerner, chair of the Lee County Democratic Party

==== Fundraising ====
Campaign finance reports as of December 31, 2023
Candidate	Raised	Spent	Cash on hand
Kari Lerner (D)	$16,949 (Note: $3,742 of this total was self-funded by Lerner)	$8,071	$8,877
Source: Federal Election Commission

=== General election ===
==== Predictions ====
Source	Ranking	As of
The Cook Political Report	Solid R	September 7, 2023
Inside Elections	Solid R	July 28, 2023
Sabato's Crystal Ball	Safe R	September 7, 2023
Elections Daily	Safe R	September 7, 2023
CNalysis	Solid R	November 16, 2023

==== Results ====
Florida's 19th congressional district, 2024
Party	Candidate	Votes	%
Republican	Byron Donalds (incumbent)	275,708	66.3
Democratic	Kari Lerner	140,038	33.7
Total votes		415,746	100.0
Republican hold			

== District 20 ==
2024 Florida's 20th congressional district election
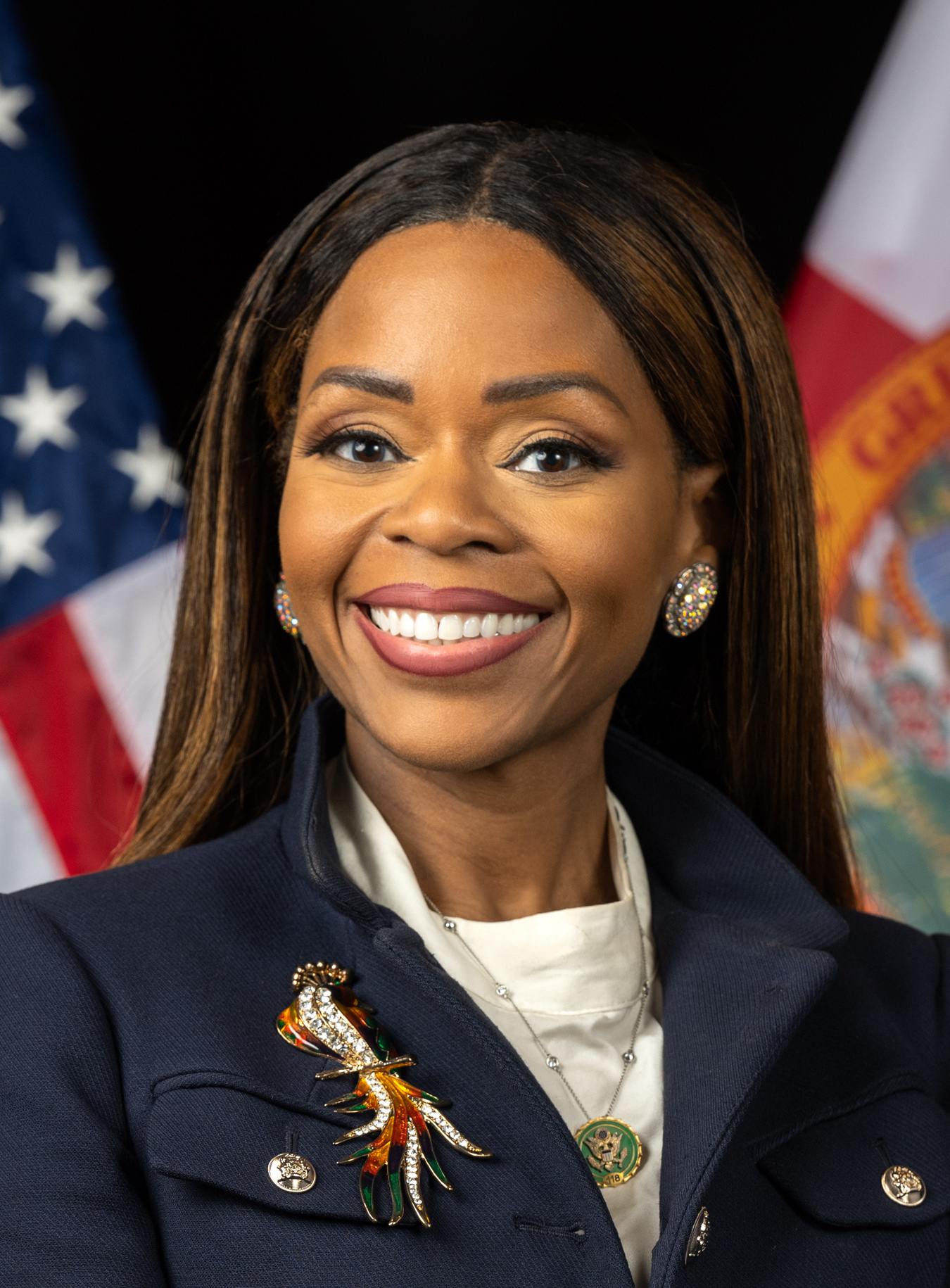
Nominee	Sheila Cherfilus-McCormick (uncontested)
Party	Democratic
U.S. Representative before election
Sheila Cherfilus-McCormick
Democratic
Elected U.S. Representative
Sheila Cherfilus-McCormick
Democratic

The incumbent was Democrat Sheila Cherfilus-McCormick, who was re-elected with 72.3% of the vote in 2022.

=== Democratic primary ===
==== Nominee ====
- Sheila Cherfilus-McCormick, incumbent U.S. representative

===== Declined =====
- Luther Campbell, rapper and candidate for mayor of Miami-Dade County in 2011

==== Endorsements ====
Sheila Cherfilus-McCormick

Organizations

- AIPAC
- Democratic Majority for Israel
- Jewish Democratic Council of America
- Population Connection Action Fund
- Pro-Israel America

==== Fundraising ====
Campaign finance reports as of December 31, 2023
Candidate	Raised	Spent	Cash on hand
Sheila Cherfilus-McCormick (D)	$327,816	$193,157	$137,436
Source: Federal Election Commission

=== General election ===
==== Predictions ====
Source	Ranking	As of
The Cook Political Report	Solid D	September 7, 2023
Inside Elections	Solid D	July 28, 2023
Sabato's Crystal Ball	Safe D	September 7, 2023
Elections Daily	Safe D	September 7, 2023
CNalysis	Solid D	November 16, 2023

== District 21 ==
2024 Florida's 21st congressional district election
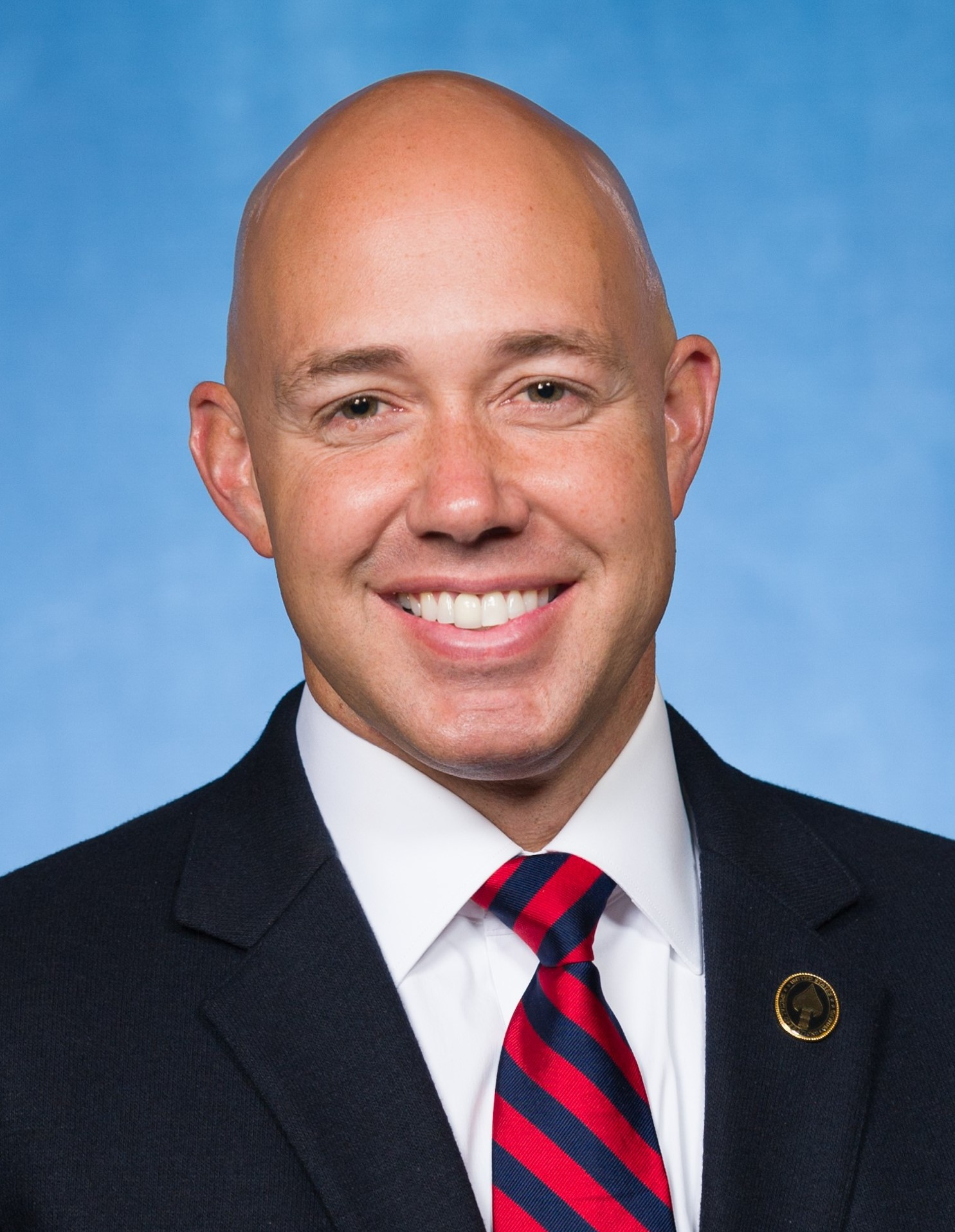

Nominee	Brian Mast	Thomas Witkop
Party	Republican	Democratic
Popular vote	277,435	171,312
Percentage	61.8%	38.2%
- County results Mast: 50–60% 60–70% 70–80%
U.S. Representative before election
Brian Mast
Republican
Elected U.S. Representative
Brian Mast
Republican

The incumbent was Republican Brian Mast, who was re-elected with 63.5% of the vote in 2022.

=== Republican primary ===
==== Nominee ====
- Brian Mast, incumbent U.S. representative

==== Eliminated in primary ====
- Rick Wiles, founder of TruNews and far-right conspiracy theorist

==== Endorsements ====
Brian Mast

Federal officials

- Donald Trump, former president of the United States and president-elect of the United States

Organizations

- AIPAC
- Pro-Israel America

==== Fundraising ====
Campaign finance reports as of December 31, 2023
Candidate	Raised	Spent	Cash on hand
Brian Mast (R)	$1,547,209	$1,571,200	$2,089,683
Source: Federal Election Commission

==== Results ====
Republican primary results
Party	Candidate	Votes	%
Republican	Brian Mast (incumbent)	60,395	85.8
Republican	Rick Wiles	9,957	14.2
Total votes		70,352	100.0

=== Democratic primary ===
==== Nominee ====
- Thomas Witkop, neighborhood resource center manager

=== General election ===
==== Write-in ====
- Elizabeth Felton

==== Predictions ====
Source	Ranking	As of
The Cook Political Report	Solid R	September 7, 2023
Inside Elections	Solid R	July 28, 2023
Sabato's Crystal Ball	Safe R	September 7, 2023
Elections Daily	Safe R	September 7, 2023
CNalysis	Solid R	November 16, 2023

==== Results ====
Florida's 21st congressional district, 2024
Party	Candidate	Votes	%
Republican	Brian Mast (incumbent)	277,435	61.8
Democratic	Thomas Witkop	171,312	38.2
Write-in	Elizabeth Felton	19	0.0
Total votes		448,766	100.0
Republican hold			

== District 22 ==
2024 Florida's 22nd congressional district election
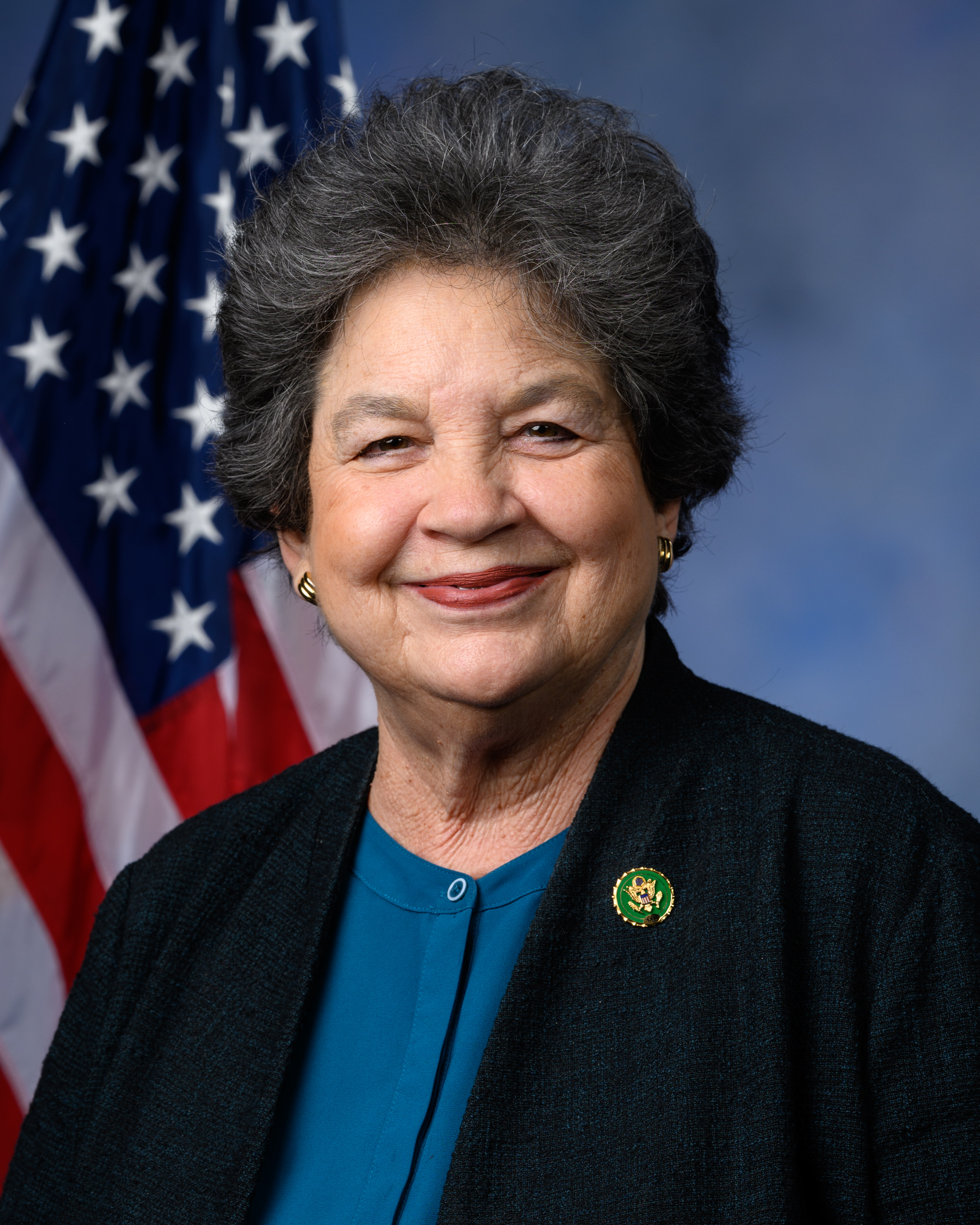

Nominee	Lois Frankel	Dan Franzese
Party	Democratic	Republican
Popular vote	201,608	165,248
Percentage	55.0%	45.0%
- Precinct results Frankel: 50–60% 60–70% 70–80% 80–90% >90% Franzese: 50–60% 60–70% 70–80% 80–90% >90% No votes
U.S. Representative before election
Lois Frankel
Democratic
Elected U.S. Representative
Lois Frankel
Democratic

The 22nd district is located in South Florida, and includes part of Palm Beach County. The district includes the cities of West Palm Beach, Boynton Beach, and Wellington. The incumbent was Democrat Lois Frankel, who was re-elected with 55.1% of the vote in 2022.

=== Democratic primary ===
==== Nominee ====
- Lois Frankel, incumbent U.S. representative

==== Endorsements ====
Lois Frankel

Organizations

- AIPAC
- Democratic Majority for Israel
- Feminist Majority PAC
- Giffords
- Jewish Democratic Council of America
- Planned Parenthood Action Fund
- Population Connection Action Fund
- Pro-Israel America

Labor unions

- National Education Association

==== Fundraising ====
Campaign finance reports as of December 31, 2023
Candidate	Raised	Spent	Cash on hand
Lois Frankel (D)	$864,026	$298,367	$1,211,365
Source: Federal Election Commission

=== Republican primary ===
==== Nominee ====
- Dan Franzese, investment executive and nominee for this district in 2022

==== Eliminated in primary ====
- Deborah Adeimy, businesswoman and candidate for this district in 2022
- Andrew Gutmann, tech executive

==== Endorsements ====
Dan Franzese

Individuals

- Rudy Giuliani, former mayor of New York City (1993–2001)

==== Fundraising ====
Campaign finance reports as of December 31, 2023
Candidate	Raised	Spent	Cash on hand
Deborah Adeimy (R)	$74,141 (Note: $2,000 of this total was self-funded by Adeimy)	$9,755	$64,829
Dan Franzese (R)	$294,556 (Note: $215,000 of this total was self-funded by Franzese)	$279,249	$23,287
Andrew Gutmann (R)	$401,026 (Note: $110,000 of this total was self-funded by Gutmann)	$93,549	$307,476
Source: Federal Election Commission

==== Results ====
Republican primary results
Party	Candidate	Votes	%
Republican	Dan Franzese	16,666	52.5
Republican	Andrew Gutmann	8,036	25.3
Republican	Deborah Adeimy	7,038	22.2
Total votes		31,740	100.0

=== General election ===
==== Predictions ====
Source	Ranking	As of
The Cook Political Report	Solid D	September 7, 2023
Inside Elections	Solid D	July 28, 2023
Sabato's Crystal Ball	Safe D	September 7, 2023
Elections Daily	Safe D	September 7, 2023
CNalysis	Solid D	November 16, 2023

==== Results ====
Florida's 22nd congressional district, 2024
Party	Candidate	Votes	%
Democratic	Lois Frankel (incumbent)	201,608	55.0
Republican	Dan Franzese	165,248	45.0
Total votes		366,856	100.0
Democratic hold			

== District 23 ==
2024 Florida's 23rd congressional district election
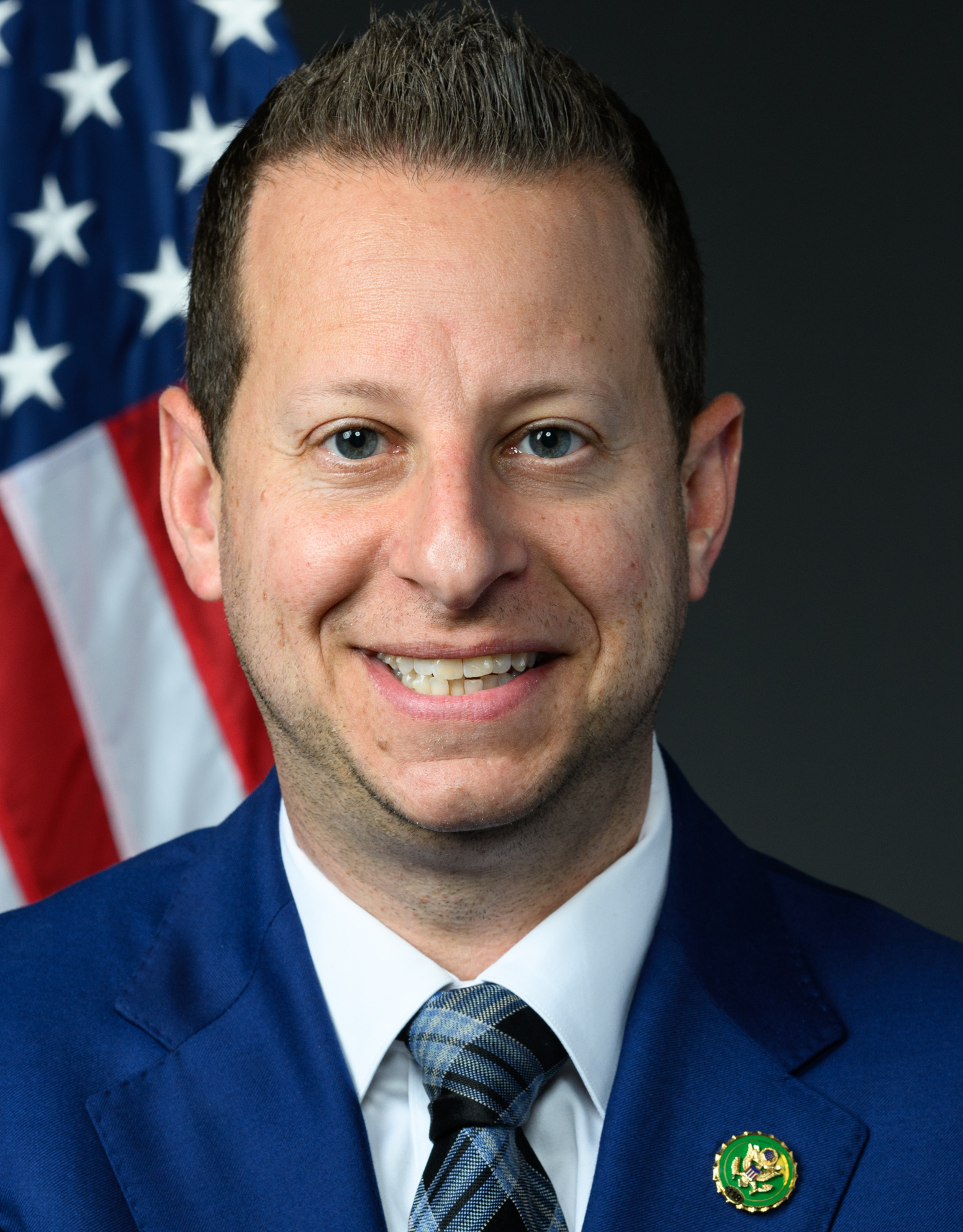

Nominee	Jared Moskowitz	Joe Kaufman
Party	Democratic	Republican
Popular vote	196,311	178,006
Percentage	52.4%	47.6%
- Moskowitz: 50–60% 60–70% 70–80% 80–90% Kaufman: 50–60% 60–70% 70–80% Tie No votes
U.S. Representative before election
Jared Moskowitz
Democratic
Elected U.S. Representative
Jared Moskowitz
Democratic

The 23rd district covers parts of Broward County and southern Palm Beach County, including the cities of Boca Raton, Coral Springs, and most of Deerfield Beach and Fort Lauderdale. The incumbent was Democrat Jared Moskowitz, who was elected with 51.6% of the vote in 2022.

=== Democratic primary ===
==== Nominee ====
- Jared Moskowitz, incumbent U.S. representative

==== Endorsements ====
Jared Moskowitz

Organizations

- AIPAC
- Democratic Majority for Israel
- Everytown for Gun Safety Action Fund
- Feminist Majority PAC
- Population Connection Action Fund
- Pro-Israel America

Labor unions

- National Education Association

==== Fundraising ====
Campaign finance reports as of December 31, 2023
Candidate	Raised	Spent	Cash on hand
Jared Moskowitz (D)	$653,427	$442,081	$293,968
Source: Federal Election Commission

=== Republican primary ===
==== Nominee ====
- Joe Kaufman, activist, perennial candidate, and nominee for this district in 2014, 2016, and 2018

==== Eliminated in primary ====
- Gary Barve, Liberty University graduate student and former intern for U.S. representative Bob Good (previously ran for Virginia's 5th congressional district)
- Darlene Cerezo Swaffar, insurance agency owner
- Carla Spalding, nurse, perennial candidate, and nominee for this district in 2020
- Joe Thelusca, business consultant
- Robert Weinroth, former Boca Raton city councilor

==== Fundraising ====
Campaign finance reports as of December 31, 2023
Candidate	Raised	Spent	Cash on hand
Joe Thelusca (R)	$13,400 (Note: $8,200 of this total was self-funded by Thelusca)	$11,403	$1,996
Source: Federal Election Commission

==== Results ====
Republican primary results
Party	Candidate	Votes	%
Republican	Joe Kaufman	9,503	35.4
Republican	Robert Weinroth	5,524	20.6
Republican	Darlene Cerezo Swaffar	5,118	19.1
Republican	Carla Spalding	2,844	10.6
Republican	Gary Barve	1,923	7.2
Republican	Joe Thelusca	1,923	7.2
Total votes		26,835	100.0

=== General election ===
==== Predictions ====
Source	Ranking	As of
The Cook Political Report	Solid D	September 6, 2024
Inside Elections	Solid D	November 13, 2023
Sabato's Crystal Ball	Safe D	September 7, 2023
Elections Daily	Safe D	November 4, 2024
CNalysis	Solid D	August 18, 2024

==== Results ====
Florida's 23rd congressional district, 2024
Party	Candidate	Votes	%
Democratic	Jared Moskowitz (incumbent)	196,311	52.4
Republican	Joe Kaufman	178,006	47.6
Total votes		374,317	100.0
Democratic hold			

== District 24 ==
2024 Florida's 24th congressional district election
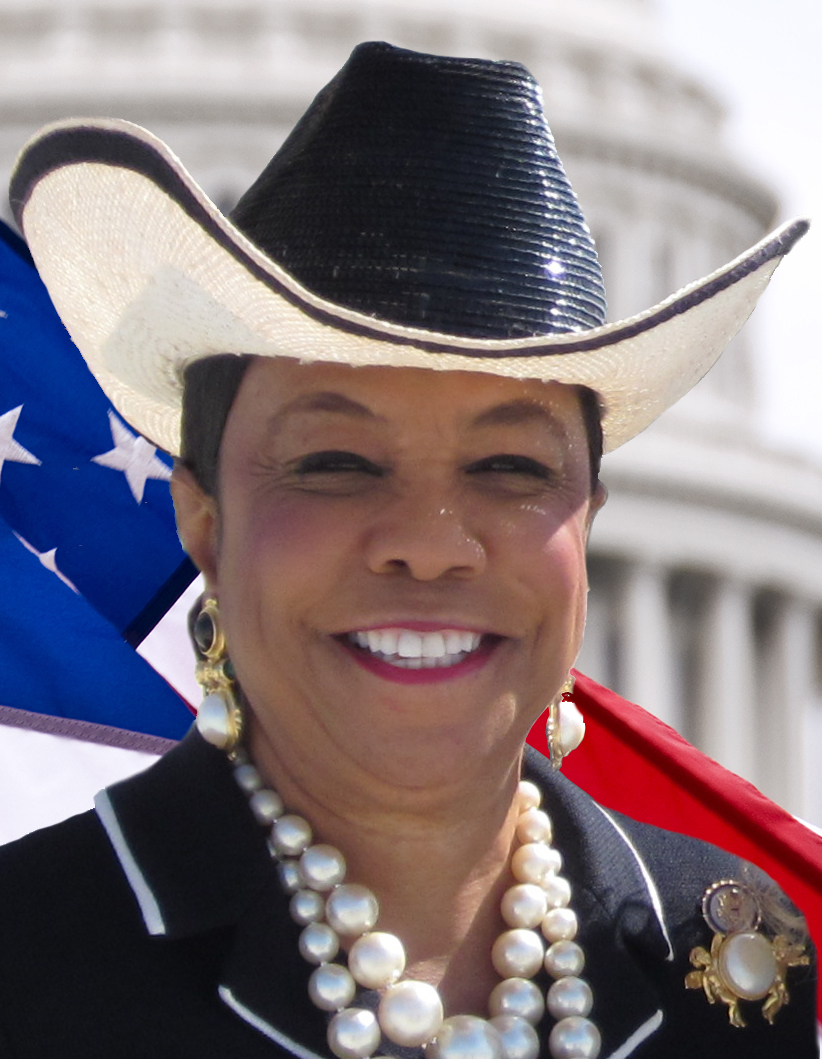

Nominee	Frederica Wilson	Jesus Navarro
Party	Democratic	Republican
Popular vote	194,874	90,692
Percentage	68.2%	31.8%
- County results Wilson: 60–70% 70–80%
U.S. Representative before election
Frederica Wilson
Democratic
Elected U.S. Representative
Frederica Wilson
Democratic

The incumbent was Democrat Frederica Wilson, who was re-elected in with 71.79% of the vote in 2022.

=== Democratic primary ===
==== Nominee ====
- Frederica Wilson, incumbent U.S. representative

==== Endorsements ====
Frederica Wilson

Organizations

- AIPAC
- Democratic Majority for Israel
- Feminist Majority PAC
- Population Connection Action Fund
- Pro-Israel America

Labor unions

- National Education Association

==== Fundraising ====
Campaign finance reports as of December 31, 2023
Candidate	Raised	Spent	Cash on hand
Frederica Wilson (D)	$230,336	$242,248	$551,696
Source: Federal Election Commission

=== Republican primary ===
==== Nominee ====
- Jesus Navarro, businessman and nominee for this district in 2022

==== Eliminated in primary ====
- Patricia Gonzalez, mortgage loan originator

==== Results ====
Republican primary results
Party	Candidate	Votes	%
Republican	Jesus Navarro	5,755	56.8
Republican	Patricia Gonzalez	4,371	43.2
Total votes		10,126	100.0

=== General election ===
==== Write-in ====
- Lavern Spicer, Republican nominee for this district in 2020 and candidate in 2022

==== Predictions ====
Source	Ranking	As of
The Cook Political Report	Solid D	September 7, 2023
Inside Elections	Solid D	July 28, 2023
Sabato's Crystal Ball	Safe D	September 7, 2023
Elections Daily	Safe D	September 7, 2023
CNalysis	Solid D	November 16, 2023

==== Results ====
Florida's 24th congressional district, 2024
Party	Candidate	Votes	%
Democratic	Frederica Wilson (incumbent)	194,874	68.2
Republican	Jesus Navarro	90,692	31.8
Write-in	Lavern Spicer	22	0.0
Total votes		285,588	100.0
Democratic hold			

== District 25 ==
2024 Florida's 25th congressional district election
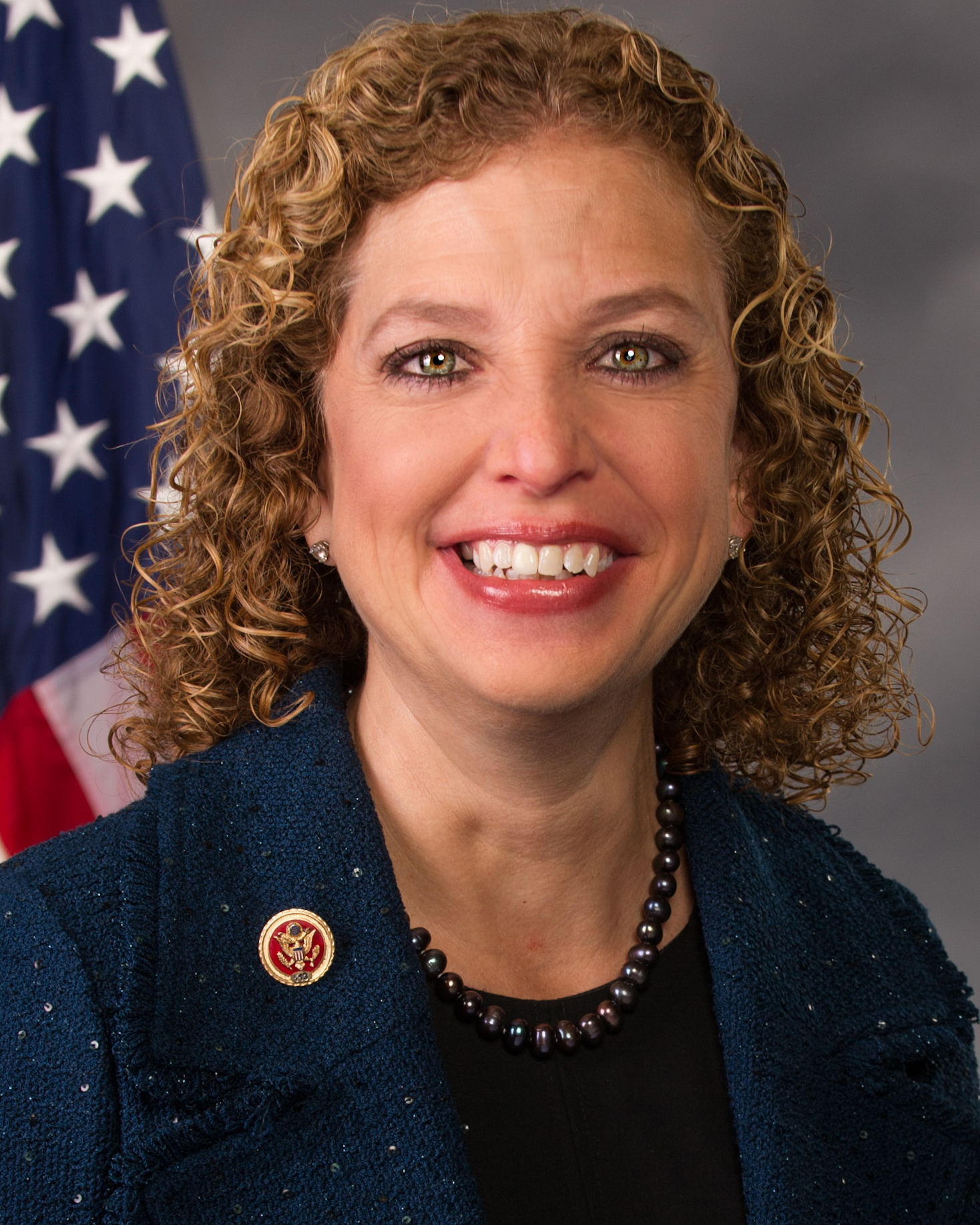

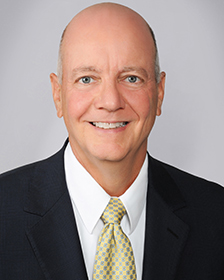
Nominee	Debbie Wasserman Schultz	Chris Eddy
Party	Democratic	Republican
Popular vote	186,942	156,208
Percentage	54.5%	45.5%
- Precinct results Schultz: 40–50% 50–60% 60–70% 70–80% 80–90% Eddy: 40–50% 50–60% 60–70% 70–80% No votes
U.S. Representative before election
Debbie Wasserman Schultz
Democratic
Elected U.S. Representative
Debbie Wasserman Schultz
Democratic

The incumbent was Democrat Debbie Wasserman Schultz, who was re-elected with 55.09% of the vote in 2022.

=== Democratic primary ===
==== Nominee ====
- Debbie Wasserman Schultz, incumbent U.S. representative

==== Eliminated in primary ====
- Jen Perelman, attorney and candidate for this district (Note: This district was numbered as the 23rd district prior to the 2020 redistricting cycle) in 2020

==== Endorsements ====
Jen Perelman

Individuals

- Howie Klein, former president of Reprise Records (1989–2001) and adjunct professor at McGill University
- Heather Digby Parton, political blogger
Debbie Wasserman Schultz

Organizations

- AIPAC
- Democratic Majority for Israel
- Feminist Majority PAC
- Giffords
- Jewish Democratic Council of America
- Joint Action Committee for Political Affairs
- Planned Parenthood Action Fund
- Population Connection Action Fund
- Pro-Israel America

Labor unions

- National Education Association

==== Fundraising ====
Campaign finance reports as of December 31, 2023
Candidate	Raised	Spent	Cash on hand
Debbie Wasserman Schultz (D)	$1,593,903	$1,019,654	$1,356,628
Source: Federal Election Commission

==== Results ====
Democratic primary results
Party	Candidate	Votes	%
Democratic	Debbie Wasserman Schultz (incumbent)	36,479	83.2
Democratic	Jen Perelman	7,349	16.8
Total votes		43,828	100.0

=== Republican primary ===
==== Nominee ====
- Chris Eddy, Weston city commissioner

==== Eliminated in primary ====
- Bryan Leib, Newsmax columnist and nominee for Pennsylvania's 3rd congressional district in 2018

==== Withdrawn ====
- Carla Spalding, nurse, perennial candidate, and nominee for this district in 2022 (ran in the 23rd district)
- Rubin Young, former legislative aide and perennial candidate

==== Endorsements ====
Chris Eddy

Organizations

- Log Cabin Republicans PAC
Bryan Leib

Federal officials

- Marshall Billingslea, former assistant secretary of the treasury for terrorist financing (2017–2021)

U.S. representatives

- Byron Donalds, FL-19
- Pat Fallon, TX-04
- Brian Mast, FL-21 (Note: Numbered as the 18th from 2017–2023)
- Mary Miller, IL-15
- Cory Mills, FL-07

State legislators

- Randy Fine, state senator
- Paul Renner, speaker of the Florida House of Representatives

Organizations

- CPAC
- Republicans for National Renewal

==== Results ====
Republican primary results
Party	Candidate	Votes	%
Republican	Chris Eddy	13,246	64.9
Republican	Bryan Leib	7,149	35.1
Total votes		20,395	100.0

==== Fundraising ====
Campaign finance reports as of September 30, 2023
Candidate	Raised	Spent	Cash on hand
Chris Eddy (R)	$164,427 (Note: $30,000 of this total was self-funded by Eddy)	$78,863	$85,563
Carla Spalding (R)	$331,995	$302,933	$41,981
Source: Federal Election Commission

=== General election ===
==== Write-in ====
- Eddie Goldfarb

==== Predictions ====
Source	Ranking	As of
The Cook Political Report	Solid D	September 7, 2023
Inside Elections	Solid D	July 28, 2023
Sabato's Crystal Ball	Safe D	September 7, 2023
Elections Daily	Safe D	September 7, 2023
CNalysis	Solid D	November 16, 2023

==== Results ====
Florida's 25th congressional district, 2024
Party	Candidate	Votes	%
Democratic	Debbie Wasserman Schultz (incumbent)	186,942	54.5
Republican	Chris Eddy	156,208	45.5
Write-in	Eddie Goldfarb	41	0.0
Total votes		343,191	100.0
Democratic hold			

== District 26 ==
2024 Florida's 26th congressional district election
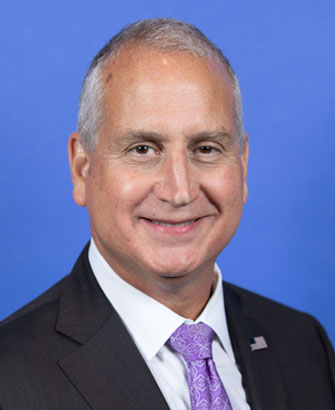

Nominee	Mario Díaz-Balart	Joey Atkins
Party	Republican	Democratic
Popular vote	217,199	89,072
Percentage	70.9%	29.1%
- County results Díaz-Balart: 70–80%
U.S. Representative before election
Mario Díaz-Balart
Republican
Elected U.S. Representative
Mario Díaz-Balart
Republican

The incumbent was Republican Mario Díaz-Balart, who was re-elected with 70.89% of the vote in 2022.

=== Republican primary ===
==== Nominee ====
- Mario Díaz-Balart, incumbent U.S. representative

==== Eliminated in primary ====
- Richard Evans, accountant
- Johnny Fratto, HVAC installer

==== Endorsements ====
Mario Díaz-Balart

Federal officials

- Donald Trump, former president of the United States and president-elect of the United States

Organizations

- AIPAC
- Pro-Israel America

==== Fundraising ====
Campaign finance reports as of December 31, 2023
Candidate	Raised	Spent	Cash on hand
Mario Díaz-Balart (R)	$982,421	$677,580	$1,584,350
Source: Federal Election Commission

==== Results ====
Republican primary results
Party	Candidate	Votes	%
Republican	Mario Díaz-Balart (incumbent)	38,334	83.5
Republican	Johnny Fratto	4,378	9.5
Republican	Richard Evans	3,178	6.9
Total votes		45,890	100.0

=== Democratic primary ===
==== Nominee ====
- Joey Atkins, attorney

=== General election ===
==== Predictions ====
Source	Ranking	As of
The Cook Political Report	Solid R	September 7, 2023
Inside Elections	Solid R	July 28, 2023
Sabato's Crystal Ball	Safe R	September 7, 2023
Elections Daily	Safe R	September 7, 2023
CNalysis	Solid R	November 16, 2023

==== Results ====
Florida's 26th congressional district, 2024
Party	Candidate	Votes	%
Republican	Mario Díaz-Balart (incumbent)	217,199	70.9
Democratic	Joey Atkins	89,072	29.1
Total votes		306,271	100.0
Republican hold			

== District 27 ==
2024 Florida's 27th congressional district election
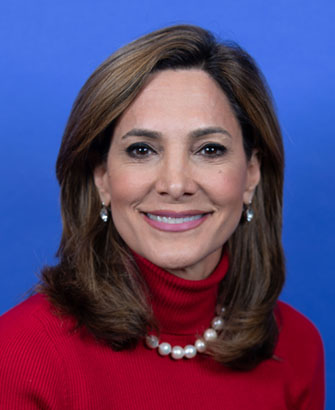

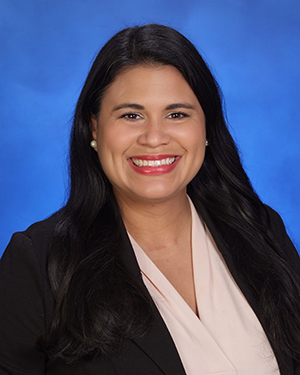
Nominee	María Elvira Salazar	Lucia Baez-Geller
Party	Republican	Democratic
Popular vote	199,159	130,708
Percentage	60.4%	39.6%
- Precinct results Salazar: 50–60% 60–70% 70–80% 80–90% >90% Baez-Geller: 50–60% 60–70% 70–80% No votes
U.S. Representative before election
María Elvira Salazar
Republican
Elected U.S. Representative
María Elvira Salazar
Republican

The 27th district includes parts of southern Miami, including Downtown, Little Havana, and Kendall, as well as Palmetto Estates and parts of Fontainebleau and Westchester. The incumbent was Republican María Elvira Salazar, who was re-elected with 57.3% of the vote in 2022.

=== Republican primary ===
==== Nominee ====
- María Elvira Salazar, incumbent U.S. representative

==== Eliminated in primary ====
- Royland Lara, bank teller

==== Endorsements ====
María Elvira Salazar

U.S. presidents

- Donald Trump, former president of the United States and president-elect of the United States

Organizations

- AIPAC
- The LIBRE Initiative
- Log Cabin Republicans PAC
- Maggie's List

==== Fundraising ====
Campaign finance reports as of December 31, 2023
Candidate	Raised	Spent	Cash on hand
María Elvira Salazar (R)	$1,310,118	$507,577	$832,420
Source: Federal Election Commission

==== Results ====
Republican primary results
Party	Candidate	Votes	%
Republican	María Elvira Salazar (incumbent)	38,493	88.7
Republican	Royland Lara	4,908	11.3
Total votes		43,401	100.0

=== Democratic primary ===
==== Nominee ====
- Lucia Baez-Geller, Miami-Dade County Public Schools board member

==== Eliminated in primary ====
- Mike Davey, former mayor of Key Biscayne

==== Endorsements ====
Lucia Báez-Geller

U.S. representatives

- Debbie Mucarsel-Powell, former U.S. representative from FL-26 (2019−2021)
- Donna Shalala, former U.S. representative from FL-27 (2019−2021)

State legislators

- Kevin Chambliss, state representative
- Ashley Gantt, state representative
- Shevrin Jones, state senator
- Annette Taddeo, former state senator

Local officials

- Javier Fernandez, mayor of South Miami

Organizations

- CHC BOLD PAC
- EMILY's List
- Latino Victory Fund
- Planned Parenthood Action Fund
- Reproductive Freedom for All

==== Fundraising ====
Campaign finance reports as of July 31, 2024
Candidate	Raised	Spent	Cash on hand
Lucia Báez-Geller (D)	$355,055	$309,117	$45,938
Michael Davey (D)	$555,708	$465,141	$90,566
Source: Federal Election Commission

==== Results ====
Democratic primary results
Party	Candidate	Votes	%
Democratic	Lucia Báez-Geller	18,591	54.2
Democratic	Mike Davey	15,738	45.8
Total votes		34,329	100.0

=== General election ===
==== Predictions ====
Source	Ranking	As of
The Cook Political Report	Likely R	August 16, 2024
Inside Elections	Likely R	July 28, 2023
Sabato's Crystal Ball	Likely R	September 7, 2023
Elections Daily	Safe R	September 7, 2023
CNalysis	Likely R	August 18, 2024
FiveThirtyEight	Likely R	August 18, 2024

=== Polling ===
Hypothetical polling

Maria Elvira Salazar vs. Mike Davey

Poll source	Date(s) administered	Sample size	Margin of error	María Elvira Salazar (R)	Mike Davey (D)	Undecided
MDW Communications (Note: Poll sponsored by Davey's campaign)	June 13–17, 2024	1,423(LV)	± 3.0%	44%	40%	16%

==== Results ====
Florida's 27th congressional district, 2024
Party	Candidate	Votes	%
Republican	Maria Elvira Salazar (incumbent)	199,159	60.4
Democratic	Lucia Baez-Geller	130,708	39.6
Total votes		329,867	100.0
Republican hold			

== District 28 ==
2024 Florida's 28th congressional district election
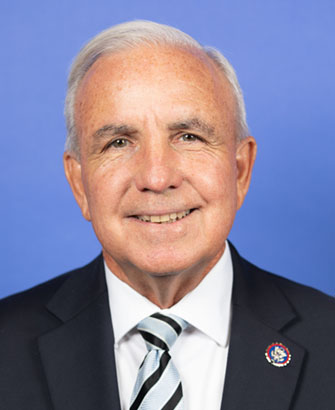

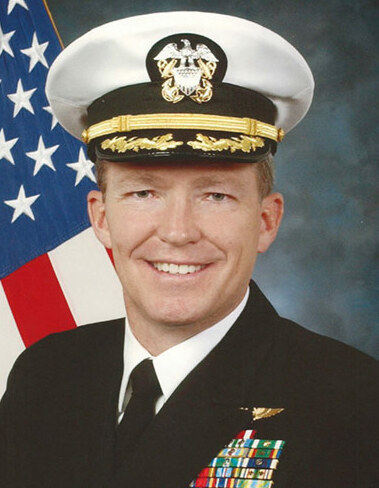
Nominee	Carlos Giménez	Phil Ehr
Party	Republican	Democratic
Popular vote	210,057	115,280
Percentage	64.6%	35.4%
- County results Giménez: 60–70%
U.S. Representative before election
Carlos Giménez
Republican
Elected U.S. Representative
Carlos Giménez
Republican

The incumbent was Republican Carlos Giménez who was re-elected with 63.69% of the vote in 2022.

=== Republican primary ===
==== Nominee ====
- Carlos Giménez, incumbent U.S. representative

==== Endorsements ====
Carlos A. Giménez

Federal officials

- Donald Trump, former president of the United States and president-elect of the United States

Organizations

- AIPAC

==== Fundraising ====
Campaign finance reports as of December 31, 2023
Candidate	Raised	Spent	Cash on hand
Carlos Giménez (R)	$545,051	$358,911	$905,945
Source: Federal Election Commission

=== Democratic primary ===
==== Nominee ====
- Phil Ehr, nonprofit executive, nominee for the 1st district in 2020 and candidate in 2018 (previously ran for U.S. Senate)

==== Withdrawn ====
- Marcos Reyes, real estate broker (ran for state house)

==== Endorsements ====
Phil Ehr

U.S. representatives

- Debbie Mucarsel-Powell, former U.S. representative for Florida's 26th congressional district (2019–2021)

Labor unions

- SEIU Florida State Council

==== Fundraising ====
Campaign finance reports as of July 31, 2024
Candidate	Raised	Spent	Cash on hand
Phil Ehr (D)	$1,059,292	$1,048,117	$14,534
Source: Federal Election Commission

=== General election ===
==== Predictions ====
Source	Ranking	As of
The Cook Political Report	Solid R	September 7, 2023
Inside Elections	Solid R	July 28, 2023
Sabato's Crystal Ball	Safe R	September 7, 2023
Elections Daily	Safe R	September 7, 2023
CNalysis	Solid R	November 16, 2023

==== Polling ====
Poll source	Date(s) administered	Sample size	Margin of error	Carlos Gímenez (R)	Phil Ehr (D)	Other	Undecided
Change Research (D) (Note: Poll sponsored by Ehr's campaign)	October 13–17, 2023	500 (LV)	± 4.7%	45%	32%	7% (Note: "Would not vote" with 7%)	16%

==== Results ====
Florida's 28th congressional district, 2024
Party	Candidate	Votes	%
Republican	Carlos Giménez (incumbent)	210,057	64.6
Democratic	Phil Ehr	115,280	35.4
Total votes		325,337	100.0
Republican hold			

== Notes ==
Partisan clients
