= Florida's 24th congressional district =

U.S. House district for Florida

Coordinates: 25°54′26″N 80°13′09″W

- Map of district boundaries
- Representative: Frederica Wilson; D–Miami Gardens
- Area: 115 mi^{2} (300 km^{2})
- Distribution: 100% urban; 0% rural
- Population (2025): 788,444
- Median household income: $72,047
- Ethnicity: 39.8% Black; 37.5% Hispanic; 17.6% White; 2.6% Two or more races; 1.5% Asian; 0.9% other
- Cook PVI: D+22

Florida's 24th congressional district is an electoral district for the U.S. Congress, located in southeast Florida. It was redrawn after the 2020 U.S. census. This district includes parts of Miami north of Florida State Road 112, including Little Haiti, as well as Brownsville, Biscayne Park, North Miami, Miami Gardens, and Opa Locka, along with the southern Broward County communities of Pembroke Park, West Park, and parts of Miramar. In the 2020 redistricting cycle, the district was drawn to include parts of barrier islands northeast of Miami, including Miami Beach and Surfside, while all of Hollywood became part of the new 25th district as Country Club and some of Miami, including Allapattah and Wynwood, became part of the new 26th district.

From 2003 to 2012, the 24th district had been created after the 2000 U.S. census and included portions of Brevard County (including Titusville) and parts of Orange, Seminole, and Volusia counties. The district encompassed Port Orange, Winter Park, Edgewater, and New Smyrna Beach. Most of that district is now the 7th District, while the current 24th covers most of what had been the 17th District from 1993 to 2013.

The district is represented by Democrat Frederica Wilson. With a Cook Partisan Voting Index rating of D+22, it is one of the most Democratic districts in Florida. The district is also one of two majority-Black districts in Florida.

== Voting ==
=== Recent election results from statewide races ===
Year	Office	Results
2008	President	Obama 82% - 17%
2010	Senate	Meek 56% - 18%
2010	Governor	Sink 82% - 18%
2010	Attorney General	Gelber 80% - 18%
2010	Chief Financial Officer	Ausley 76% - 21%
2012	President	Obama 83% - 17%
2012	Senate	Nelson 84% - 16%
2014	Governor	Crist 83% - 17%
2016	President	Clinton 81% - 17%
2016	Senate	Murphy 76% - 22%
2018	Senate	Nelson 81% - 19%
2018	Governor	Gillum 81% - 18%
2018	Attorney General	Shaw 80% - 18%
2018	Chief Financial Officer	Ring 81% - 18%
2020	President	Biden 74% - 25%
2022	Senate	Demings 69% - 29%
2022	Governor	Crist 68% - 31%
2022	Attorney General	Ayala 69% - 31%
2022	Chief Financial Officer	Hattersley 69% - 31%
2024	President	Harris 65% - 35%
2024	Senate	Mucarsel-Powell 65% - 33%

=== Voter registration ===
As of October 2020:

- Democrats: 267,980 (61.62%)
- Independents: 110,078 (25.31%)
- Republicans: 52,492 (12.07%)
- Others: 4,317 (0.99%)

== Composition ==
For the 118th and successive Congresses (based on redistricting following the 2020 census), the district contains all or portions of the following counties and communities:

Broward County (3)

Pembroke Park, Miramar (part; also 25th), West Park

Miami-Dade County (26)

Aventura, Bal Harbour, Bay Harbor Islands, Biscayne Park, Brownsville (part; also 26th), El Portal, Fisher Island, Gladeview (part; also 26th), Golden Beach, Golden Glades, Ives Estates, Miami (part; also 26th and 27th), Miami Beach, Miami Gardens, Miami Shores, North Bay Village, North Miami, North Miami Beach, Ojus, Opa-locka, Pinewood, Sunny Isles Beach, Surfside, West Little River (part; also 24th), West Park, Westview

== List of members representing the district ==
Name	Party	Years	Cong ress	Electoral history	Counties
District created January 3, 2003
Tom Feeney (Oviedo)	Republican	January 3, 2003 – January 3, 2009	108th 109th 110th	Elected in 2002. Re-elected in 2004. Re-elected in 2006. Lost re-election.	2003–2013 Brevard, Orange, Seminole, and Volusia
Suzanne Kosmas (New Smyrna Beach)	Democratic	January 3, 2009 – January 3, 2011	111th	Elected in 2008. Lost re-election.	2003–2013 Brevard, Orange, Seminole, and Volusia
Sandy Adams (Orlando)	Republican	January 3, 2011 – January 3, 2013	112th	Elected in 2010. Redistricted to the 7th district and lost renomination.	2003–2013 Brevard, Orange, Seminole, and Volusia
Frederica Wilson (Miami Gardens)	Democratic	January 3, 2013 – present	113th 114th 115th 116th 117th 118th 119th	Redistricted from the 17th district and re-elected in 2012. Re-elected in 2014. Re-elected in 2016. Re-elected in 2018. Re-elected in 2020. Re-elected in 2022. Re-elected in 2024. Retiring at end of term.	2013–2017 Broward and Miami-Dade
Frederica Wilson (Miami Gardens)	Democratic	January 3, 2013 – present	113th 114th 115th 116th 117th 118th 119th	Redistricted from the 17th district and re-elected in 2012. Re-elected in 2014. Re-elected in 2016. Re-elected in 2018. Re-elected in 2020. Re-elected in 2022. Re-elected in 2024. Retiring at end of term.	2017–2023 Broward and Miami-Dade
Frederica Wilson (Miami Gardens)	Democratic	January 3, 2013 – present	113th 114th 115th 116th 117th 118th 119th	Redistricted from the 17th district and re-elected in 2012. Re-elected in 2014. Re-elected in 2016. Re-elected in 2018. Re-elected in 2020. Re-elected in 2022. Re-elected in 2024. Retiring at end of term.	2023–2027: Broward and Miami-Dade
Oliver Gilbert (Miami Gardens)	Democratic	Assuming office on January 3, 2027		Elected in 2026.	2023–2027: Broward and Miami-Dade

== Election results ==
=== 2002 ===
2002 United States House of Representatives elections in Florida: District 24
Party	Candidate	Votes	%
Republican	Tom Feeney	135,576	61.84
Democratic	Harry Jacobs	83,667	38.16
Total votes		219,243	100.00
Republican win (new seat)			

=== 2004 ===
2004 United States House of Representatives elections in Florida: District 24
Party	Candidate	Votes	%
Republican	Tom Feeney (incumbent)	Unopposed	100.00
Total votes			100.00
Republican hold			

=== 2006 ===
2006 United States House of Representatives elections in Florida: District 24
Party	Candidate	Votes	%
Republican	Tom Feeney (incumbent)	123,795	57.94
Democratic	Clint Curtis	89,863	42.06
Total votes		213,658	100.00
Republican hold			

=== 2008 ===
2008 United States House of Representatives elections in Florida: District 24
Party	Candidate	Votes	%
Democratic	Suzanne Kosmas	211,284	57.20
Republican	Tom Feeney (incumbent)	151,863	41.11
Independent	Gaurav Bhola	6,223	1.68
Total votes		369,370	100.00
Democratic gain from Republican			

=== 2010 ===
2010 United States House of Representatives elections in Florida: District 24
Party	Candidate	Votes	%
Republican	Sandy Adams	146,129	59.66
Democratic	Suzanne Kosmas (incumbent)	98,787	40.34
Total votes		244,916	100.00
Republican gain from Democratic			

=== 2012 ===
2012 United States House of Representatives elections in Florida: District 24
Party	Candidate	Votes	%
Democratic	Frederica Wilson (incumbent)	Unopposed	100.00
Total votes			100.00
Democratic hold			

=== 2014 ===
2014 United States House of Representatives elections in Florida: District 24
Party	Candidate	Votes	%
Democratic	Frederica Wilson (incumbent)	129,192	86.17
Republican	Dufirstson Julio Neree	15,239	10.16
Independent	Luis E. Fernandez	5,487	3.66
Total votes		149,918	100.00
Democratic hold			

=== 2016 ===
2016 United States House of Representatives elections in Florida: District 24
Party	Candidate	Votes	%
Democratic	Frederica Wilson (incumbent)	Unopposed	100.00
Total votes			100.00
Democratic hold			

=== 2018 ===
2018 United States House of Representatives elections in Florida: District 24
Party	Candidate	Votes	%
Democratic	Frederica Wilson (incumbent)	Unopposed	100.00
Total votes			100.00
Democratic hold			

=== 2020 ===
2020 United States House of Representatives elections in Florida: District 24
Party	Candidate	Votes	%
Democratic	Frederica Wilson (incumbent)	218,825	75.55
Republican	Lavern Spicer	59,084	20.39
Independent	Christine Olivo	11,703	4.04
Write-in		26	0.01
Total votes		289,638	100.00
Democratic hold			

=== 2022 ===
2022 United States House of Representatives elections in Florida: District 24
Party	Candidate	Votes	%
Democratic	Frederica Wilson (incumbent)	133,442	71.79
Republican	Jesus Navarro	52,449	28.21
Total votes		185,891	100.00
Democratic hold			

=== 2024 ===
2024 United States House of Representatives elections in Florida: District 24
Party	Candidate	Votes	%
Democratic	Frederica Wilson (incumbent)	194,874	68.24
Republican	Jesus Navarro	90,692	31.76
Write-in		22	0.01
Total votes		289,638	100.00
Democratic hold			
