= Florida's 25th congressional district =

U.S. House district for Florida

Coordinates: 26°05′42″N 81°04′01″W

- Map of district boundaries
- Representative: Debbie Wasserman Schultz; D–Weston
- Area: 3,678 mi^{2} (9,530 km^{2})
- Distribution: 94.4% urban; 5.6% rural
- Population (2025): 803,273
- Median household income: $90,965
- Ethnicity: 43.1% Hispanic; 32.5% White; 15.0% Black; 5.0% Asian; 3.3% Two or more races; 1.1% other
- Cook PVI: R+3

Florida's 25th congressional district is a congressional district in the Broward County area of Florida. In the 2020 redistricting cycle, it was drawn as a successor to the previous 23rd district and includes much of southern Broward County, including Weston, Davie, Pembroke Pines, Hollywood, and parts of Miramar and Plantation. The previous iteration of the 25th district, which stretched from Collier County to the suburbs of Miami, was instead renamed the 26th district.

The prior 25th district, from 2003 through 2013, stretched across a great swath of the Everglades and included parts of Collier, Miami-Dade, and Hendry counties. It took in the Miami-Dade municipalities of Homestead, Leisure City, and Cutler Bay.

In the 2010 redistricting cycle, much of this area was redrawn into the 26th district, while the 25th district was reconfigured from what was the 21st district from 1993 to 2003. From 2017 to 2023, the district included all of Hendry County, most of Collier County excluding the coastal fringe, and the northwest of Miami-Dade County. Major cities in the district included Hialeah, Doral, LaBelle, and Clewiston. Previous iterations of the district had a large Cuban American population, making up 44.3% of the population, the largest proportion in any district in the United States.

The district is currently represented by Democrat Debbie Wasserman Schultz, who previously represented the 23rd district before redistricting.

== Recent election results from statewide races ==
=== 2023–2027 ===
Year	Office	Results
2008	President	Obama 63% - 37%
2010	Governor	Sink 63% - 37%
2010	Attorney General	Gelber 55% - 38%
2010	Chief Financial Officer	Ausley 49% - 42%
2012	President	Obama 63% - 37%
2012	Senate	Nelson 67% - 33%
2014	Governor	Crist 66% - 34%
2016	President	Clinton 63% - 34%
2016	Senate	Murphy 59% - 39%
2018	Senate	Nelson 65% - 35%
2018	Governor	Gillum 64% - 36%
2018	Attorney General	Shaw 63% - 36%
2018	Chief Financial Officer	Ring 64% - 36%
2020	President	Biden 60% - 40%
2022	Senate	Demings 54% - 45%
2022	Governor	Crist 52% - 47%
2022	Attorney General	Ayala 53% - 47%
2022	Chief Financial Officer	Hattersley 53% - 47%
2024	President	Harris 52% - 47%
2024	Senate	Mucarsel-Powell 54% - 45%

=== 2027–2033 ===
Year	Office	Results
2008	President	Obama 57% - 43%
2012	President	Obama 54% - 46%
2016	President	Clinton 54% - 43%
2016	Senate	Murphy 51% - 47%
2018	Senate	Nelson 56% - 44%
2018	Governor	Gillum 55% - 44%
2018	Attorney General	Shaw 54% - 45%
2018	Chief Financial Officer	Ring 55% - 45%
2020	President	Biden 52% - 47%
2022	Senate	Rubio 52% - 47%
2022	Governor	DeSantis 54% - 45%
2022	Attorney General	Moody 54% - 46%
2022	Chief Financial Officer	Patronis 54% - 46%
2024	President	Trump 54% - 45%
2024	Senate	Scott 53% - 46%

== Composition ==
For the 118th and successive Congresses (based on redistricting following the 2020 census), the district contains all or portions of the following counties and communities:

Broward County (12)

Broadview Park, Cooper City, Dania Beach, Davie, Fort Lauderdale (part; also 20th), Hallandale Beach, Hollywood, Miramar (part; also 24th), Pembroke Pines, Plantation (part; also 20th), Southwest Ranches, Weston

== List of members representing the district ==
Member	Party	Years	Cong ress	Electoral history	Geography
District created January 3, 2003
Mario Díaz-Balart (Miami)	Republican	January 3, 2003 – January 3, 2011	108th 109th 110th 111th	Elected in 2002. Re-elected in 2004. Re-elected in 2006. Re-elected in 2008. Moved to the 21st district and re-elected.	2003–2013 Collier, Miami-Dade, and Monroe
David Rivera (Miami)	Republican	January 3, 2011 – January 3, 2013	112th	Elected in 2010. Redistricted to the 26th district and lost re-election.	2003–2013 Collier, Miami-Dade, and Monroe
Mario Díaz-Balart (Miami)	Republican	January 3, 2013 – January 3, 2023	113th 114th 115th 116th 117th	Redistricted from the 21st district and re-elected in 2012. Re-elected in 2014. Re-elected in 2016. Re-elected in 2018. Re-elected in 2020. Redistricted to the 26th district.	2013–2017 Broward, Collier, Hendry, and Miami-Dade
Mario Díaz-Balart (Miami)	Republican	January 3, 2013 – January 3, 2023	113th 114th 115th 116th 117th	Redistricted from the 21st district and re-elected in 2012. Re-elected in 2014. Re-elected in 2016. Re-elected in 2018. Re-elected in 2020. Redistricted to the 26th district.	2017–2023 Collier, Hendry, and Miami-Dade
Debbie Wasserman Schultz (Weston)	Democratic	January 3, 2023 – present	118th 119th	Redistricted from the 23rd district and re-elected in 2022. Re-elected in 2024. Moved to run in the 20th district.	2023–2027: Broward
Jared Moskowitz (Parkland)	Democratic	Assuming office on January 3, 2027		Redistricted from the 23rd district and re-elected in 2026.	2023–2027: Broward

== Election results ==
=== 2002 ===
Florida's 25th Congressional District Election (2002)
Party	Candidate	Votes	%
Republican	Mario Díaz-Balart	81,845	64.65
Democratic	Annie Betancourt	44,757	35.35
Total votes		126,602	100.00
Republican hold			

=== 2004 ===
Florida's 25th Congressional District Election (2004)
Party	Candidate	Votes	%
Republican	Mario Díaz-Balart (incumbent)		100.00
Total votes			100.00
Republican hold			

=== 2006 ===
Florida's 25th Congressional District Election (2006)
Party	Candidate	Votes	%
Republican	Mario Díaz-Balart (incumbent)	60,765	58.47
Democratic	Michael Calderin	43,168	41.53
Total votes		103,933	100.00
Republican hold			

=== 2008 ===
Florida's 25th Congressional District Election (2008)
Party	Candidate	Votes	%
Republican	Mario Díaz-Balart (incumbent)	130,891	53.05
Democratic	Joe Garcia	115,820	46.95
Total votes		246,711	100.00
Republican hold			

=== 2010 ===
Florida's 25th Congressional District Election (2010)
Party	Candidate	Votes	%
Republican	David Rivera	74,859	52.15
Democratic	Joe Garcia	61,138	42.59
Independent	Roly Arrojo	4,312	3.00
Independent	Craig Porter	3,244	2.26
Total votes		143,553	100.00
Republican hold			

- NOTE: Rory Arrojo ran as a candidate on the Tea Party platform on the ballot.
- NOTE: Craig Porter ran as a candidate on the Florida Whig Party platform on the ballot.

=== 2012 ===
Florida's 25th Congressional District Election (2012)
Party	Candidate	Votes	%
Republican	Mario Díaz-Balart (incumbent)	151,466	75.6
Independent	Stanley Blumenthal	31,664	15.8
Independent	VoteforEddie.Com	17,099	8.5
Total votes		200,229	100.00
Republican hold			

=== 2014 ===
Florida's 25th Congressional District Election (2014)
Party	Candidate	Votes	%
Republican	Mario Díaz-Balart (incumbent)	0	100.00
Total votes		0	100.00
Republican hold			

=== 2016 ===
Florida's 25th Congressional District Election (2016)
Party	Candidate	Votes	%
Republican	Mario Díaz-Balart (incumbent)	157,921	62.4
Democratic	Alina Valdes	95,319	37.6
Total votes		253,240	100.00
Republican hold			

=== 2018 ===
Florida's 25th Congressional District Election (2018)
Party	Candidate	Votes	%
Republican	Mario Díaz-Balart (incumbent)	128,672	60.5
Democratic	Mary Barzee Flores	84,173	39.5
Total votes		212,845	100.00
Republican hold			

=== 2020 ===
2020 United States House of Representatives elections in Florida
Party	Candidate	Votes	%
Republican	Mario Díaz-Balart (incumbent)	0	100.00
Total votes		0	100.00
Republican hold			

=== 2022 ===
2022 United States House of Representatives elections in Florida
Party	Candidate	Votes	%
Democratic	Debbie Wasserman Schultz (incumbent)	129,113	55.09
Republican	Carla Spalding	105,239	44.91
Total votes		234,352	100.0
Democratic hold			

=== 2024 ===
2024 United States House of Representatives elections in Florida
Party	Candidate	Votes	%
Democratic	Debbie Wasserman Schultz (incumbent)	186,942	54.47
Republican	Chris Eddy	156,208	45.12
Write-in		41	0.01
Total votes		343,191	100.0
Democratic hold			

=== 2026 ===
2026 United States House of Representatives elections in Florida
Party	Candidate	Votes	%
Democratic	Jared Moskowitz (incumbent)		
Republican	Scott Singer		
Total votes			
