= Florida's 23rd congressional district =

U.S. House district for Florida

Coordinates: 26°04′25″N 80°20′46″W

- Map of district boundaries
- Representative: Jared Moskowitz; D–Parkland
- Area: 259 mi^{2} (670 km^{2})
- Distribution: 99.96% urban; 0.04% rural
- Population (2025): 790,722
- Median household income: $94,546
- Ethnicity: 55.2% White; 21.9% Hispanic; 12.2% Black; 5.4% Two or more races; 3.7% Asian; 1.6% other
- Cook PVI: D+9

Florida's 23rd congressional district is an electoral district for the U.S. Congress, located in the Greater Miami area and covering parts of Broward County and southern Palm Beach County. In the 2020 redistricting cycle, it was drawn as a successor to the previous 22nd district and includes Boca Raton, Coral Springs, most of Deerfield Beach and Fort Lauderdale, and parts of Pompano Beach. The previous iteration of the 23rd district, which included Davie and Pembroke Pines, was instead renamed the 25th district. The district, along with two other districts in Greater Miami, has one of the highest concentrations of Jewish Americans, consisting of about 14% of the electorate. It is the second wealthiest congressional district in Florida and the 96th wealthiest in the United States, with 16.8 percent of households earning over $200,000, per a 2024 study.

Florida's 23rd congressional district was created after the 1990 U.S. census. Democrat Alcee Hastings won the first election for the district in 1992 until being redistricted to the 20th congressional district in 2013. From 2003 to 2013, the former 23rd district consisted of a major part of Broward County and parts of Palm Beach county. The district included Pompano Beach, Boynton Beach, and Belle Glade.

From 2013 to 2023, the district included cities such as Weston, Davie, Pembroke Pines, and Aventura, as well as Fort Lauderdale–Hollywood International Airport and Nova Southeastern University.

The district is currently represented by Democrat Jared Moskowitz.

== Recent election results from statewide races ==
Year	Office	Results
2008	President	Obama 58% - 41%
2010	Senate	Rubio 41% - 18%
2010	Governor	Sink 56% - 44%
2010	Attorney General	Gelber 48% - 45%
2010	Chief Financial Officer	Attwater 52% - 41%
2012	President	Obama 56% - 44%
2012	Senate	Nelson 61% - 39%
2014	Governor	Crist 59% - 41%
2016	President	Clinton 56% - 41%
2016	Senate	Murphy 54% - 44%
2018	Senate	Nelson 59% - 41%
2018	Governor	Gillum 58% - 41%
2018	Attorney General	Shaw 57% - 42%
2018	Chief Financial Officer	Ring 58% - 42%
2020	President	Biden 56% - 43%
2022	Senate	Demings 51% - 48%
2022	Governor	DeSantis 50% - 49%
2022	Attorney General	Moody 50.2% - 49.8%
2022	Chief Financial Officer	Patronis 50.1% - 49.9%
2024	President	Harris 51% - 49%
2024	Senate	Mucarsel-Powell 51% - 47%

== Composition ==
For the 118th and successive Congresses (based on redistricting following the 2020 census), the district contains all or portions of the following counties and communities:

Broward County (15)

Coconut Creek, Coral Springs, Deerfield Beach (part; also 20th), Fort Lauderdale (part; also 20th), Hillsboro Beach, Hillsboro Pines, Lauderdale-by-the-Sea, Lazy Lake, Lighthouse Point, Margate (part; also 20th), Oakland Park (part; also 20th), Parkland, Pompano Beach (part; also 20th), Sea Ranch Lakes, Wilton Manors

Palm Beach County (3)

Boca Raton, Highland Beach, Watergate

== List of members representing the district ==
Member	Party	Years	Cong ress	Electoral history	District location
District created January 3, 1993
Alcee Hastings (Miramar)	Democratic	January 3, 1993 – January 3, 2013	103rd 104th 105th 106th 107th 108th 109th 110th 111th 112th	Elected in 1992. Re-elected in 1994. Re-elected in 1996. Re-elected in 1998. Re-elected in 2000. Re-elected in 2002. Re-elected in 2004. Re-elected in 2006. Re-elected in 2008. Re-elected in 2010. Redistricted to the 20th district.	1993–2003 [data missing]
Alcee Hastings (Miramar)	Democratic	January 3, 1993 – January 3, 2013	103rd 104th 105th 106th 107th 108th 109th 110th 111th 112th	Elected in 1992. Re-elected in 1994. Re-elected in 1996. Re-elected in 1998. Re-elected in 2000. Re-elected in 2002. Re-elected in 2004. Re-elected in 2006. Re-elected in 2008. Re-elected in 2010. Redistricted to the 20th district.	2003–2013
Debbie Wasserman Schultz (Weston)	Democratic	January 3, 2013 – January 3, 2023	113th 114th 115th 116th 117th	Redistricted from the 20th district and re-elected in 2012. Re-elected in 2014. Re-elected in 2016. Re-elected in 2018. Re-elected in 2020. Redistricted to the 25th district.	2013–2017
Debbie Wasserman Schultz (Weston)	Democratic	January 3, 2013 – January 3, 2023	113th 114th 115th 116th 117th	Redistricted from the 20th district and re-elected in 2012. Re-elected in 2014. Re-elected in 2016. Re-elected in 2018. Re-elected in 2020. Redistricted to the 25th district.	2017–2023
Jared Moskowitz (Parkland)	Democratic	January 3, 2023 – present	118th 119th	Elected in 2022. Re-elected in 2024. Redistricted to the 25th district.	2023–2027: The coastline of Broward County to southern Palm Beach County
Lois Frankel (West Palm Beach)	Democratic	Assuming office on January 3, 2027		Redistricted from the 22nd district and re-elected in 2026.	2023–2027: The coastline of Broward County to southern Palm Beach County

== Election results ==
=== 2002 ===
Florida's 23rd Congressional District Election (2002)
Party	Candidate	Votes	%
Democratic	Alcee Hastings (Incumbent)	96,347	77.49%
Republican	Charles Laurie	27,986	22.51%
No party	Others	5	0.00%
Total votes		124,338	100.00%
Democratic hold			

=== 2004 ===
Florida's 23rd Congressional District Universal Primary Election (2004)
Party	Candidate	Votes	%
Democratic	Alcee Hastings (Incumbent)	49,284	74.23%
Democratic	Keith A. Clayborne	17,106	25.77%
Total votes		66,390	100.00%
Democratic hold			

=== 2006 ===
Florida's 23rd Congressional District Election (2006)
Party	Candidate	Votes	%
Democratic	Alcee Hastings (Incumbent)	106,278	100.00%
Total votes		106,278	100.00%
Democratic hold			

=== 2008 ===
Florida's 23rd Congressional District Election (2008)
Party	Candidate	Votes	%
Democratic	Alcee Hastings (Incumbent)	172,835	82.18%
Republican	Marion D. Thorpe, Jr.	37,431	17.80%
No party	April Cook	40	0.02%
Total votes		210,306	100.00%
Democratic hold			

=== 2010 ===
Florida's 23rd Congressional District Election (2010)
Party	Candidate	Votes	%
Democratic	Alcee Hastings (Incumbent)	100,066	79.12%
Republican	Bernard Sansaricq	26,414	20.88%
Total votes		126,480	100.00%
Democratic hold			

=== 2012 ===
2012 United States House of Representatives elections in Florida: District 23
Party	Candidate	Votes	%
Democratic	Debbie Wasserman Schultz	174,205	63.25%
Republican	Karen Harrington	98,096	35.62%
No party	Ilya Katz	3,129	1.13%
Total votes		275,430	100.00%
Democratic hold			

=== 2014 ===
2014 United States House of Representatives elections in Florida: District 23
Party	Candidate	Votes	%
Democratic	Debbie Wasserman Schultz (Incumbent)	103,269	62.67%
Republican	Joe Kaufman	61,519	37.33%
Total votes		164,788	100.00%
Democratic hold			

=== 2016 ===
2016 United States House of Representatives elections in Florida: District 23
Party	Candidate	Votes	%
Democratic	Debbie Wasserman Schultz (Incumbent)	183,225	56.70%
Republican	Joe Kaufman	130,818	40.49%
No party	Don Endriss	5,180	1.60
No party	Lyle Milstein	3,897	1.21
Total votes		323,120	100.00%
Democratic hold			

=== 2018 ===
2018 United States House of Representatives elections in Florida: District 23
Party	Candidate	Votes	%
Democratic	Debbie Wasserman Schultz (Incumbent)	161,611	58.5%
Republican	Joe Kaufman	99,446	36.0%
No party	Tim Canova	13,697	5.0
No party	Don Endriss	1,612	0.6
Total votes		276,366	100.0%
Democratic hold			

=== 2020 ===
2020 United States House of Representatives elections in Florida: District 23
Party	Candidate	Votes	%
Democratic	Debbie Wasserman Schultz (incumbent)	221,239	58.19%
Republican	Carla Spalding	158,874	41.78%
Independent Republican	Jeff Olson (write-in)	46	0.01%
Independent Republican	D. B. Fugate (write-in)	37	0.01%
Total votes		381,196	100.0
Democratic hold			

=== 2022 ===
2022 United States House of Representatives elections in Florida: District 23
Party	Candidate	Votes	%
Democratic	Jared Moskowitz	143,951	51.59%
Republican	Joe Budd	130,681	46.83%
Independent	Christine Scott	3,079	1.10%
Independent	Mark Napier	1,338	0.48%
Total votes		279,049	100.0
Democratic hold			

=== 2024 ===
2024 United States House of Representatives elections in Florida: District 23
Party	Candidate	Votes	%
Democratic	Jared Moskowitz (Incumbent)	196,311	52.45%
Republican	Joe Kaufman	178,006	47.55%
Total votes		374,317	100.00%
Democratic hold			

=== 2026 ===
2026 United States House of Representatives elections in Florida
Party	Candidate	Votes	%
Democratic	Lois Frankel (incumbent)		
Republican	Deborah Adeimy		
Total votes			
