= Florida's 7th congressional district =

U.S. House district for Florida

Coordinates: 28°43′33″N 81°13′11″W

- Map of district boundaries since January 3, 2023 (Note: The district includes the same census blocks as drawn for the 2020 redistricting cycle in 2022 and during mid-decade redistricting in 2026. As such, boundaries of the district will not change at the 2026 elections.) (Interactive map version)
- Representative: Cory Mills; R–New Smyrna Beach
- Area: 436 mi^{2} (1,130 km^{2})
- Distribution: 97.87% urban; 2.13% rural
- Population (2025): 814,939
- Median household income: $85,842
- Ethnicity: 61.5% White; 20.8% Hispanic; 8.8% Black; 4.2% Two or more races; 3.9% Asian; 0.8% other
- Cook PVI: R+5

Florida's 7th congressional district is a congressional district in the north central portion of the U.S. state of Florida.

From 2003 to 2013, the district consisted of the suburban area between Orlando and Daytona Beach and included St. Augustine. The district included all of Flagler and St. Johns Counties; a very small portion of eastern Putnam County; parts of Volusia County, including portions of DeLand, Deltona, Ormond Beach, and Daytona Beach; much of western Seminole County; and a small, predominantly suburban portion of Orange County.

Following court-ordered redistricting in 2015, the district included all of Seminole County and northern Orange County, including much of downtown and northern Orlando and the cities of Maitland and Winter Park. At the time, the district was also home to the University of Central Florida (UCF), the state's largest university by student population in 2020–2021.

Following further redistricting in 2022 based on the 2020 United States census, the 7th district still includes all of Seminole County. It now includes the southern half of Volusia County, while the portion of the district that extended into Orange County, including UCF, is now part of the 10th congressional district.

The district is currently represented in the U.S. Congress by Rep. Cory Mills.

== Recent election results from statewide races ==
Year	Office	Results
2008	President	McCain 50% – 49%
2010	Senate	Rubio 55% – 20%
2010	Governor	Scott 53% – 47%
2010	Attorney General	Bondi 57% – 37%
2010	Chief Financial Officer	Atwater 59% – 33%
2012	President	Romney 53% – 47%
2012	Senate	Nelson 55% – 45%
2014	Governor	Scott 54% – 46%
2016	President	Trump 51% – 44%
2016	Senate	Rubio 54% – 41%
2018	Senate	Scott 52% – 48%
2018	Governor	DeSantis 52% – 47%
2018	Attorney General	Moody 55% – 43%
2018	Chief Financial Officer	Patronis 54% – 46%
2020	President	Trump 52% – 47%
2022	Senate	Rubio 57% – 42%
2022	Governor	DeSantis 60% – 39%
2022	Attorney General	Moody 62% – 38%
2022	Chief Financial Officer	Patronis 60% – 40%
2024	President	Trump 56% – 43%
2024	Senate	Scott 55% – 43%

== Composition ==
For the 118th and successive Congresses (based on redistricting following the 2020 census), the district contains all or portions of the following counties and communities:

Seminole County (16)

All 16 communities

Volusia County (12)

Daytona Beach Shores, DeBary, Deltona, Edgewater, Glencoe, Lake Helen, New Smyrna Beach, Oak Hill, Orange City, Ponce Inlet, Port Orange, Samsula-Spruce Creek

== List of members representing the district ==
Member	Party	Years	Cong ress	Electoral history	District map
District created January 3, 1953
James A. Haley (Sarasota)	Democratic	January 3, 1953 – January 3, 1973	83rd 84th 85th 86th 87th 88th 89th 90th 91st 92nd	Elected in 1952. Re-elected in 1954. Re-elected in 1956. Re-elected in 1958. Re-elected in 1960. Re-elected in 1962. Re-elected in 1964. Re-elected in 1966. Re-elected in 1968. Re-elected in 1970. Redistricted to the 8th district.	1953–1973 [data missing]
Sam Gibbons (Tampa)	Democratic	January 3, 1973 – January 3, 1993	93rd 94th 95th 96th 97th 98th 99th 100th 101st 102nd	Redistricted from the 6th district and re-elected in 1972. Re-elected in 1974. Re-elected in 1976. Re-elected in 1978. Re-elected in 1980. Re-elected in 1982. Re-elected in 1984. Re-elected in 1986. Re-elected in 1988. Re-elected in 1990. Redistricted to the 11th district.	1973–1993 [data missing]
John Mica (Winter Park)	Republican	January 3, 1993 – January 3, 2017	103rd 104th 105th 106th 107th 108th 109th 110th 111th 112th 113th 114th	Elected in 1992. Re-elected in 1994. Re-elected in 1996. Re-elected in 1998. Re-elected in 2000. Re-elected in 2002. Re-elected in 2004. Re-elected in 2006. Re-elected in 2008. Re-elected in 2010. Re-elected in 2012. Re-elected in 2014. Lost re-election.	1993–2003 [data missing]
John Mica (Winter Park)	Republican	January 3, 1993 – January 3, 2017	103rd 104th 105th 106th 107th 108th 109th 110th 111th 112th 113th 114th	Elected in 1992. Re-elected in 1994. Re-elected in 1996. Re-elected in 1998. Re-elected in 2000. Re-elected in 2002. Re-elected in 2004. Re-elected in 2006. Re-elected in 2008. Re-elected in 2010. Re-elected in 2012. Re-elected in 2014. Lost re-election.	2003–2013
John Mica (Winter Park)	Republican	January 3, 1993 – January 3, 2017	103rd 104th 105th 106th 107th 108th 109th 110th 111th 112th 113th 114th	Elected in 1992. Re-elected in 1994. Re-elected in 1996. Re-elected in 1998. Re-elected in 2000. Re-elected in 2002. Re-elected in 2004. Re-elected in 2006. Re-elected in 2008. Re-elected in 2010. Re-elected in 2012. Re-elected in 2014. Lost re-election.	2013–2017
Stephanie Murphy (Winter Park)	Democratic	January 3, 2017 – January 3, 2023	115th 116th 117th	Elected in 2016. Re-elected in 2018. Re-elected in 2020. Retired.	2017–2023
Cory Mills (New Smyrna Beach)	Republican	January 3, 2023 – present	118th 119th	Elected in 2022. Re-elected in 2024. Lost renomination.	2023–2027
Ryan Elijah (Sanford)	Republican	Assuming office on January 3, 2027		Elected in 2026.	2023–2027

== Electoral history ==
=== 2002 ===
Florida's 7th Congressional District Election (2002)
Party	Candidate	Votes	%
Republican	John L. Mica (incumbent)	142,147	59.58
Democratic	Wayne Hogan	96,444	40.42
Total votes		238,591	100.00
Republican hold			

=== 2004 ===
Florida's 7th Congressional District Election (2004)
Party	Candidate	Votes	%
Republican	John L. Mica (incumbent)		100.00
Total votes			100.00
Republican hold			

=== 2006 ===
Florida's 7th Congressional District Election (2006)
Party	Candidate	Votes	%
Republican	John L. Mica (incumbent)	149,656	59.88
Democratic	John F. Chagnon	87,584	36.92
Total votes		237,240	100.00
Republican hold			

=== 2008 ===
Florida's 7th Congressional District Election (2008)
Party	Candidate	Votes	%
Republican	John L. Mica (incumbent)	238,721	62.00
Democratic	Faye Armitage	146,292	38.00
Total votes		385,013	100.00
Republican hold			

=== 2010 ===
Florida's 7th Congressional District Election (2010)
Party	Candidate	Votes	%
Republican	John L. Mica (incumbent)	185,470	69.03
Democratic	Heather Beaven	83,206	30.97
Total votes		268,676	100.00
Republican hold			

=== 2012 ===
Florida 7th Congressional District 2012
Party	Candidate	Votes	%
Republican	John Mica (incumbent)	185,518	58.71
Democratic	Jason H. Kendall	130,479	41.29
Write-in	Fred Marra	13	<0.01
Total votes		316,010	100.0
Republican hold			

=== 2014 ===
Florida's 7th Congressional District election, 2014
Party	Candidate	Votes	%
Republican	John Mica (incumbent)	144,474	63.60
Democratic	Wes Neuman	73,011	32.14
No Party Affiliation	Al Krulick	9,679	4.26
Total votes		227,164	100.00
Republican hold			

=== 2016 ===
Florida's 7th congressional district election, 2016
Party	Candidate	Votes	%
Democratic	Stephanie Murphy	182,039	51.47
Republican	John Mica (incumbent)	171,583	48.52
No Party Affiliation	Mike Plaskon	33	0.01
Total votes		353,655	100
Democratic gain from Republican			

=== 2018 ===
Florida's 7th Congressional District Election, 2018
Party	Candidate	Votes	%
Democratic	Stephanie Murphy (incumbent)	183,113	57.7
Republican	Mike Miller	134,285	42.3
Total votes		317,398	100.00
Democratic hold			

=== 2020 ===
Florida's 7th Congressional District Election, 2020
Party	Candidate	Votes	%
Democratic	Stephanie Murphy (incumbent)	224,946	55.34
Republican	Leo Valentín	175,750	43.24
No Party Affiliation	William Garlington	5,753	1.42
Total votes		406,449	100.00
Democratic hold			

=== 2022 ===
Florida's 7th congressional district election, 2022
Party	Candidate	Votes	%
Republican	Cory Mills	177,966	58.53
Democratic	Karen Green	126,079	41.47
Independent	Cardon Pompey (write-in)	10	<0.01
Total votes		304,045	100.00
Republican gain from Democratic			

=== 2024 ===
Florida's 7th congressional district election, 2024
Party	Candidate	Votes	%
Republican	Cory Mills (incumbent)	233,937	56.53
Democratic	Jennifer Adams	179,917	43.47
Total votes		413,854	100.00
Republican hold			

=== 2026 ===
Florida's 7th congressional district election, 2026
Party	Candidate	Votes	%
Republican	Ryan Elijah	161,300	49.71
Democratic	Bale Dalton	159,669	49.21
Libertarian	Christopher Dennison	3,485	1.07
Total votes		324,454	100.00
Republican hold			
