= 2016 United States presidential election in Florida =

- November 8, 2016
- Turnout: 74.48% (▲2.94 pp)

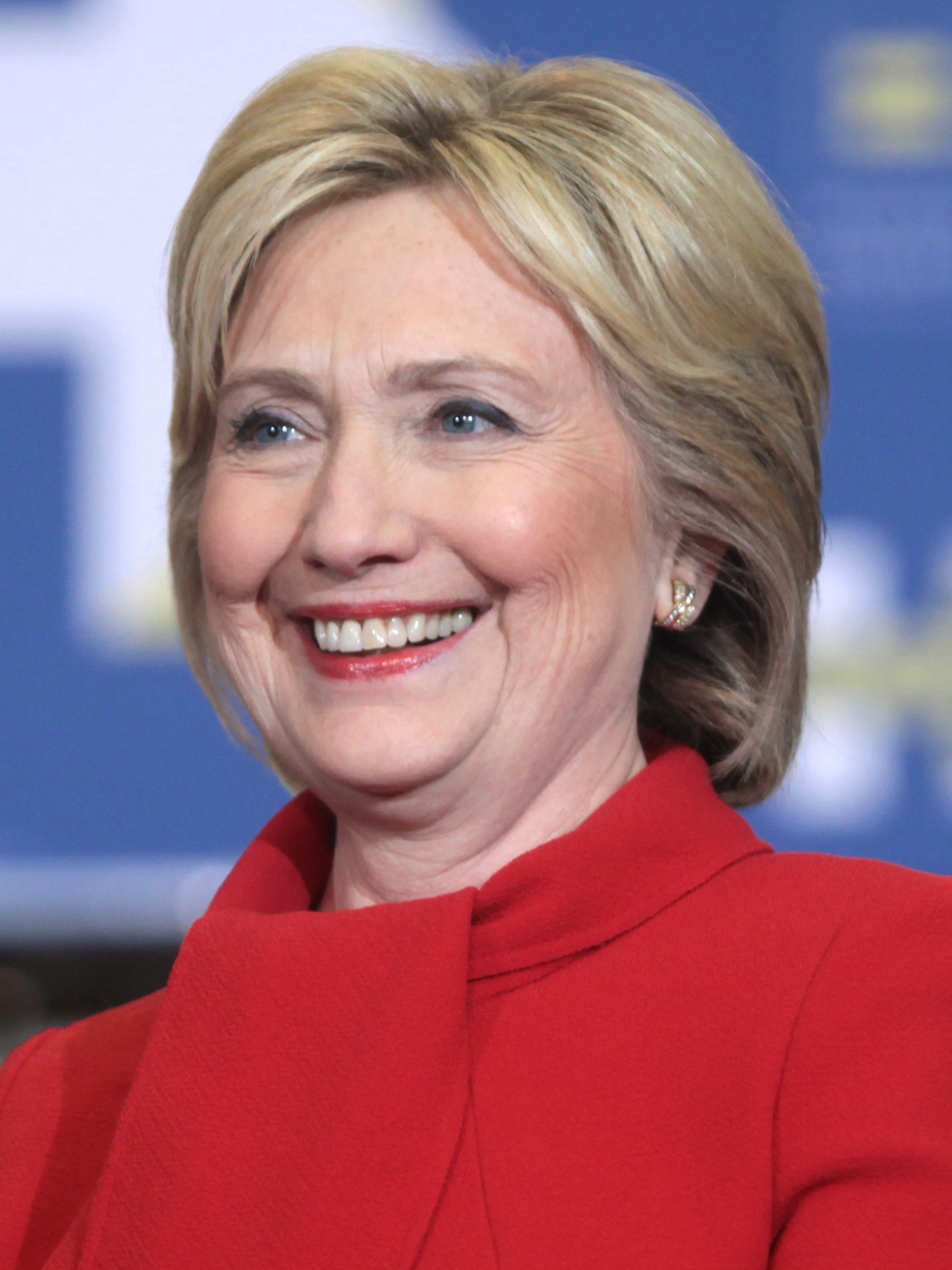
Nominee	Donald Trump	Hillary Clinton
Party	Republican	Democratic
Home state	New York	New York
Running mate	Mike Pence	Tim Kaine
Electoral vote	29	0
Popular vote	4,617,886	4,504,975
Percentage	49.02%	47.82%

Trump
40–50%
50–60%
60–70%
70–80%
80–90%
90–100%
Clinton
40–50%
50–60%
60–70%
70–80%
80–90%
90–100%
Tie/No data
President before election
Barack Obama
Democratic
Elected President
Donald Trump
Republican

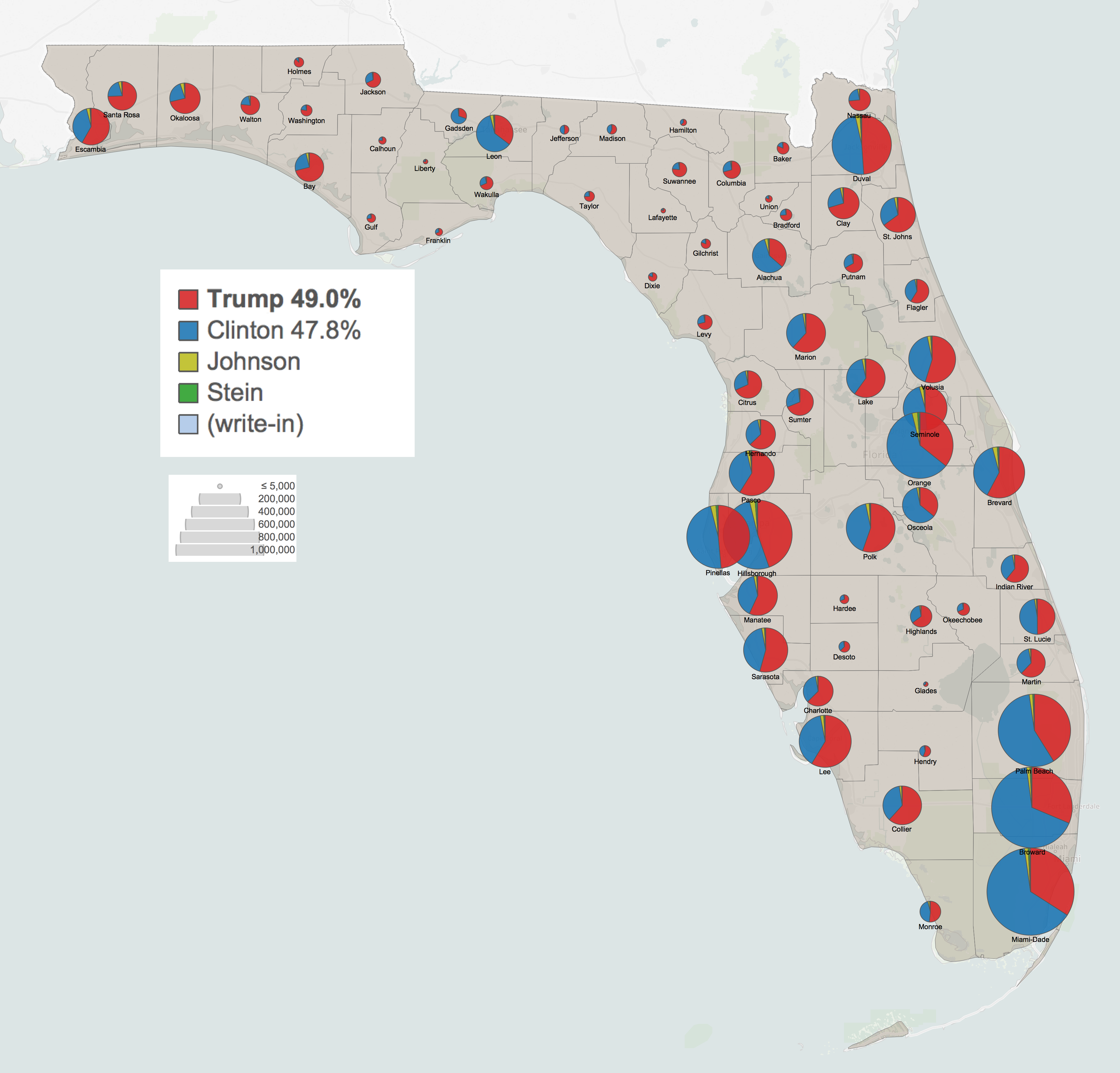
Results by county showing number of votes by size and candidates by color

Treemap of the popular vote by county.

The 2016 United States presidential election in Florida was held on Tuesday, November 8, 2016, as part of the 2016 United States presidential election in which all 50 states plus the District of Columbia participated. Florida voters chose electors to represent them in the Electoral College via a popular vote, pitting the Republican nominee, businessman Donald Trump, and his running mate Indiana Governor Mike Pence, against the Democratic nominee, former U.S. Secretary of State Hillary Clinton, and her running mate Virginia Senator Tim Kaine. Florida had 29 electoral votes in the Electoral College.

Trump carried the state with a plurality of 49.0% of the popular vote, which included a 1.2% winning margin over Clinton, who had 47.8% of the vote. Trump consequently became the first Republican to win the White House without carrying Hillsborough County since Calvin Coolidge in 1924. Trump was also the first Republican presidential candidate to carry St. Lucie County since 1992, and the first to carry Jefferson and Monroe Counties since 1988; all three of these counties were last carried by George H. W. Bush.

Florida voted for Donald Trump by a margin of 1.20%. It was the fifth-closest state result, with only Wisconsin, Michigan, New Hampshire and Pennsylvania closer. According to the National Election Pool, Trump got a majority of 54% from the Cuban-American voters in the state—in comparison to the 71% of Clinton support by Latino voters from other origins. This was the first time Florida voted for a Republican who lost the popular vote since the infamous 2000 election in Florida, when the Republican candidate also won the election while losing the popular vote. As of 2024, this was the last presidential election in which Florida voted to the left of neighboring Georgia. In 2016, Georgia swung leftward by 2.7% despite not being seriously contested, while Florida swung rightward by 2%.

This is the closest election contested by any of Trump's three Democratic opponents in his presidential bids, as the Florida electorate has decisively swung to the right in the Trump political era. Trump won a majority of the vote in the state in 2020 and won the state by double digits in 2024. Relatedly, this would be the last time Trump ran for president as a resident of another state (New York) rather than of Florida.

== Primary elections ==
=== Democratic primary ===
==== Democratic debate ====
March 9, 2016 – Kendall, Florida

Candidate	Airtime	Polls
Clinton	23:29	51.0%
Sanders	17:51	39.6%

The eighth debate took place on March 9, 2016, at 9:00 PM Eastern Standard Time in Building 7 of the Kendall Campus of Miami Dade College in Kendall, Florida. It was broadcast through a partnership between Univision and The Washington Post. The debate was discussed during a job interview conducted in early 2015 between the Democratic National Committee's then-Communications Director Mo Elleithee and future Hispanic Media Director Pablo Manriquez. After starting at the DNC in April 2015, Manriquez "talked about the idea for a debate for Democratic candidates on Univision to anyone who had ears to listen." The debate was officially announced on November 2, 2015.

==== Results ====
Election results by county. Hillary Clinton Bernie Sanders

Three candidates appeared on the Democratic presidential primary ballot:

2016 Democratic Party's presidential nominating process in Florida – Summary of results –
Candidate	Popular vote		Estimated delegates		
Candidate	Count	Percentage	Pledged	Unpledged	Total
Hillary Clinton	1,101,414	64.44%	141	24	165
Bernie Sanders	568,839	33.28%	73	2	75
Martin O'Malley (withdrawn)	38,930	2.28%			
Uncommitted	—N/a		0	6	6
Total	1,709,183	100%	214	32	246

Florida Democratic primary, March 15, 2016
District	Delegates	Votes Clinton	Votes Sanders	Votes Qualified	Clinton delegates	Sanders delegates
1	3	26987	18497	45484	2	1
2	6	50190	34073	84263	4	2
3	4	32070	27974	60044	2	2
4	4	33920	22765	56685	2	2
5	6	55855	18639	74494	4	2
6	5	37995	24443	62438	3	2
7	5	37410	26795	64205	3	2
8	5	39384	24376	63760	3	2
9	5	40609	19880	60489	3	2
10	5	38011	22213	60224	3	2
11	5	38061	21590	59651	3	2
12	5	35498	23172	58670	3	2
13	6	44121	29707	73828	4	2
14	6	49146	23617	72763	4	2
15	5	32793	20712	53505	3	2
16	6	43921	25856	69777	4	2
17	4	29899	17045	46944	3	1
18	6	42804	20620	63424	4	2
19	4	31958	17235	49193	3	1
20	7	61998	15761	77759	6	1
21	7	57723	22100	79823	5	2
22	6	49602	22209	71811	4	2
23	6	44510	19974	64484	4	2
24	8	59274	13893	73167	6	2
25	3	24897	9287	34184	2	1
26	4	32069	14148	46217	3	1
27	4	30709	12258	42967	3	1
Total	140	1101414	568839	1670253	93	47
PLEO	28	1101414	568839	1670253	18	10
At Large	46	1101414	568839	1670253	30	16
Gr. Total	214	1101414	568839	1670253	141	73
Total vote		64.44%	33.28%	1,709,183		
Source: Florida Department of State Division of Elections

=== Republican primary ===
==== Republican debate ====
March 10, 2016 – Coral Gables, Florida

Candidate	Airtime	Polls
Trump	28:11	38.6%
Cruz	21:42	21.8%
Rubio	21:23	18.0%
Kasich	18:49	12.0%

The twelfth debate was the fourth and final debate to air on CNN and led into the Florida, Illinois, North Carolina, Missouri, and Ohio primaries on March 15. The candidates debated at the University of Miami, moderated by Jake Tapper and questioned by CNN chief political correspondent Dana Bash, Salem Radio Network talk-show host Hugh Hewitt, and Washington Times contributor Stephen Dinan. The Washington Times cohosted the debate. The debate was originally scheduled considering the likelihood that no candidate would clinch the Republican nomination before March 15, due to the overall size of the field. On the day of the debate, CNN summarized the immediate stakes: "This debate comes just five days ahead of 'Super Tuesday 3', when more than 350 delegates are decided, including winner-take-all contests in Florida and Ohio. Both Trump and Rubio are predicting [a win in] Florida. For Trump, a win here would fuel his growing momentum and further grow his delegate lead; for Rubio, losing his home state could be the death knell for his campaign." This was the twelfth and final debate appearance of Rubio, who suspended his campaign on March 15.

==== Results ====
Election results by county. Donald Trump Marco Rubio

Twelve candidates appeared on the Republican presidential primary ballot:

Florida Republican primary, March 15, 2016
Candidate	Votes	Percentage	Actual delegate count		
Candidate	Votes	Percentage	Bound	Unbound	Total
Donald Trump	1,079,870	45.72%	99	0	99
Marco Rubio	638,661	27.04%	0	0	0
Ted Cruz	404,891	17.14%	0	0	0
John Kasich	159,976	6.77%	0	0	0
Jeb Bush (withdrawn)	43,511	1.84%	0	0	0
Ben Carson (withdrawn)	21,207	0.90%	0	0	0
Rand Paul (withdrawn)	4,450	0.19%	0	0	0
Mike Huckabee (withdrawn)	2,624	0.11%	0	0	0
Chris Christie (withdrawn)	2,493	0.11%	0	0	0
Carly Fiorina (withdrawn)	1,899	0.08%	0	0	0
Rick Santorum (withdrawn)	1,211	0.05%	0	0	0
Lindsey Graham (withdrawn)	693	0.03%	0	0	0
Jim Gilmore (withdrawn)	319	0.01%	0	0	0
Unprojected delegates:			0	0	0
Total:	2,361,805	100.00%	99	0	99
Source: The Green Papers

.

=== Green primary ===
The Green Party held a primary in Florida on July 31, 2016. Early voting began on July 25.

On July 31, 2016, the Green Party of Florida announced that Jill Stein had won the Florida primary via instant-runoff voting.

Green Party of Florida primary – first round
Candidate	Votes	Percentage	National delegates
Jill Stein	18	52.9%	
Elijah Manley	14	41.2%	
William Kreml	1	2.94%	
Kent Mesplay	1	2.94%	
Sedinam Curry	0		
Darryl Cherney	0		
Total	34	100%	

Green Party of Florida primary – second round
Candidate	Votes	Percentage	National delegates
Jill Stein	19	55.9%	
Elijah Manley	14	41.2%	
William Kreml	1	2.94%	
Total	34	100	

Green Party of Florida primary – third round
Candidate	Votes	Percentage	National delegates
Jill Stein	20	58.8%	15
Elijah Manley	14	41.2%	10
Total	34	100	25

== General election ==
=== Predictions ===
The following are final 2016 predictions from various organizations for Florida as of Election Day.

Source	Ranking	As of
Los Angeles Times	Lean D	November 6, 2016
CNN	Tossup	November 4, 2016
Rothenberg Political Report	Tilt D	November 7, 2016
Sabato's Crystal Ball	Lean D	November 7, 2016
NBC	Tossup	November 8, 2016
Electoral-vote.com	Tossup	November 8, 2016
RealClearPolitics	Tossup	November 8, 2016
Fox News	Tossup	November 7, 2016
ABC	Tossup	November 7, 2016

=== Polling ===
In early polling conducted in late 2015, Trump started with strong momentum and won almost every poll against Clinton by margins varying from 2 to 8 points. In March 2016, Trump's early momentum seemed to slow, as Clinton won every poll until June 2016, when Trump won a poll 45% to 44%. Most polling conducted throughout the summer was favorable to Clinton, but both candidates were neck and neck in late August and early September, with neither having a consistent lead. From mid September to October 20, Clinton won every poll but one. In the last weeks, polling was extremely close, with neither candidate taking the lead. The third to last and fourth to last poll ended in a tie, but Trump won the last poll 50% to 46%. The average of the last three polls showed Trump ahead 47.3% to 46.7%, where the race was essentially tied.

=== Results ===
2016 United States presidential election in Florida
Party	Presidential candidate	Popular vote		Electoral vote
Party	Presidential candidate	Count	Percentage	Electoral vote
Republican	Donald Trump	4,617,886	49.02%	29
Democratic	Hillary Clinton	4,504,975	47.82%	0
Libertarian	Gary Johnson	207,043	2.20%	0
Green	Jill Stein	64,399	0.68%	0
Constitution	Darrell L. Castle	16,475	0.17%	0
Reform	Rocky De La Fuente	9,108	0.10%	0
Write-in	-	153	0.01%	0
Date	November 8, 2016	Total voters	Registered: 12,863,773; Eligible: 14,441,877	
Turnout %	Registered: 74.48% VAP: 66.34%	Turnout votes	Valid votes: 9,420,039; Invalid votes: 160,450	

==== By county ====
County	Donald Trump Republican		Hillary Clinton Democratic		Various candidates Other parties		Margin		Total votes cast
County	#	%	#	%	#	%	#	%	Total votes cast
Alachua	46,834	36.00%	75,820	58.28%	7,446	5.72%	-28,986	-22.28%	130,100
Baker	10,294	81.02%	2,112	16.62%	299	2.36%	8,182	64.40%	12,705
Bay	62,194	70.50%	21,797	24.71%	4,231	4.79%	40,397	45.79%	88,222
Bradford	8,913	73.31%	2,924	24.05%	321	2.64%	5,989	49.26%	12,158
Brevard	181,848	57.16%	119,679	37.62%	16,614	5.22%	62,169	19.54%	318,141
Broward	260,951	31.16%	553,320	66.08%	23,117	2.76%	-292,369	-34.92%	837,388
Calhoun	4,655	75.96%	1,241	20.25%	232	3.79%	3,414	55.71%	6,128
Charlotte	60,128	61.96%	33,445	34.41%	3,524	3.63%	26,773	27.55%	97,187
Citrus	54,456	67.72%	22,789	28.34%	3,167	3.94%	31,667	39.38%	80,412
Clay	74,963	69.85%	27,822	25.93%	4,532	4.22%	47,141	43.92%	107,317
Collier	105,423	61.11%	61,085	35.41%	6,002	3.48%	44,338	25.70%	172,510
Columbia	20,368	70.57%	7,601	26.33%	895	3.10%	12,767	44.24%	28,864
DeSoto	6,778	62.17%	3,781	34.68%	344	3.15%	2,997	27.49%	10,903
Dixie	5,822	80.35%	1,270	17.53%	154	2.12%	4,552	62.82%	7,246
Duval	211,672	48.48%	205,704	47.12%	19,197	4.40%	5,968	1.36%	436,573
Escambia	88,808	57.60%	57,461	37.27%	7,903	5.13%	31,347	20.33%	154,172
Flagler	33,850	58.38%	22,026	37.98%	2,111	3.64%	11,824	20.40%	57,987
Franklin	4,125	68.08%	1,744	28.78%	190	3.14%	2,381	39.30%	6,059
Gadsden	6,728	30.29%	15,020	67.62%	466	2.09%	-8,292	-37.33%	22,214
Gilchrist	6,740	79.56%	1,458	17.21%	274	3.23%	5,282	62.35%	8,472
Glades	2,996	68.37%	1,271	29.01%	115	2.62%	1,725	39.36%	4,382
Gulf	5,329	72.69%	1,720	23.46%	282	3.85%	3,609	49.23%	7,331
Hamilton	3,443	62.70%	1,904	34.67%	144	2.63%	1,539	28.03%	5,491
Hardee	5,242	68.57%	2,149	28.11%	254	3.32%	3,093	40.46%	7,645
Hendry	6,195	55.40%	4,615	41.27%	372	3.33%	1,580	14.13%	11,182
Hernando	58,970	62.30%	31,795	33.59%	3,886	4.11%	27,175	28.71%	94,651
Highlands	29,565	64.26%	14,937	32.46%	1,509	3.28%	14,628	31.80%	46,011
Hillsborough	266,870	44.19%	307,896	50.99%	29,124	4.82%	-41,026	-6.80%	603,890
Holmes	7,483	87.46%	853	9.97%	220	2.57%	6,630	77.49%	8,556
Indian River	48,620	60.20%	29,043	35.96%	3,106	3.84%	19,577	24.24%	80,769
Jackson	14,257	67.38%	6,397	30.23%	505	2.39%	7,860	37.15%	21,159
Jefferson	3,930	51.11%	3,541	46.05%	218	2.84%	389	5.06%	7,689
Lafayette	2,809	82.35%	518	15.19%	84	2.46%	2,291	67.16%	3,411
Lake	102,188	59.48%	62,838	36.58%	6,773	3.94%	39,350	22.90%	171,799
Lee	191,551	58.12%	124,908	37.90%	13,095	3.98%	66,643	20.22%	329,554
Leon	53,821	34.98%	92,068	59.83%	7,992	5.19%	-38,247	-24.85%	153,881
Levy	13,775	70.64%	5,101	26.16%	623	3.20%	8,674	44.48%	19,499
Liberty	2,543	76.78%	651	19.66%	118	3.56%	1,892	57.12%	3,312
Madison	4,851	56.80%	3,526	41.29%	163	1.91%	1,325	15.51%	8,540
Manatee	101,944	56.40%	71,224	39.40%	7,589	4.20%	30,720	17.00%	180,757
Marion	107,833	61.30%	62,041	35.27%	6,026	3.43%	45,792	26.03%	175,900
Martin	53,204	61.41%	30,185	34.84%	3,244	3.75%	23,019	26.57%	86,633
Miami-Dade	333,999	33.83%	624,146	63.22%	29,046	2.95%	-290,147	-29.39%	987,191
Monroe	21,904	50.97%	18,971	44.14%	2,102	4.89%	2,933	6.83%	42,977
Nassau	34,266	72.92%	10,869	23.13%	1,857	3.95%	23,397	49.79%	46,992
Okaloosa	71,893	70.42%	23,780	23.29%	6,423	6.29%	48,113	47.13%	102,096
Okeechobee	9,356	67.99%	3,959	28.77%	446	3.24%	5,397	39.22%	13,761
Orange	195,216	35.37%	329,894	59.77%	26,792	4.86%	-134,678	-24.40%	511,902
Osceola	50,301	35.56%	85,458	60.41%	5,709	4.03%	-35,157	-24.85%	141,468
Palm Beach	272,402	40.89%	374,673	56.24%	19,137	2.87%	-102,271	-15.35%	666,212
Pasco	142,101	58.41%	90,142	37.06%	11,022	4.53%	51,959	21.35%	243,265
Pinellas	239,201	48.08%	233,701	46.98%	24,583	4.94%	5,500	1.10%	497,485
Polk	157,430	54.86%	117,433	40.92%	12,106	4.22%	39,997	13.94%	286,969
Putnam	22,138	66.48%	10,094	30.31%	1,069	3.21%	12,044	36.17%	33,301
St. Johns	88,684	64.34%	43,099	31.27%	6,063	4.39%	45,585	33.07%	137,846
St. Lucie	70,289	49.50%	66,881	47.10%	4,823	3.40%	3,408	2.40%	141,993
Santa Rosa	65,339	73.68%	18,464	20.82%	4,881	5.50%	46,875	52.86%	88,684
Sarasota	124,438	53.79%	97,870	42.30%	9,045	3.91%	26,568	11.49%	231,353
Seminole	109,443	48.10%	105,914	46.55%	12,169	5.35%	3,529	1.55%	227,526
Sumter	52,730	68.27%	22,638	29.31%	1,870	2.42%	30,092	38.96%	77,238
Suwannee	14,287	76.05%	3,964	21.10%	536	2.85%	10,323	54.95%	18,787
Taylor	6,930	74.13%	2,152	23.02%	266	2.85%	4,778	51.11%	9,348
Union	4,568	79.83%	1,014	17.72%	140	2.45%	3,554	62.11%	5,722
Volusia	143,007	54.32%	109,091	41.44%	11,180	4.24%	33,916	12.88%	263,278
Wakulla	10,512	68.07%	4,348	28.15%	584	3.78%	6,164	39.92%	15,444
Walton	25,756	75.98%	6,876	20.28%	1,266	3.74%	18,880	55.70%	33,898
Washington	8,637	77.04%	2,264	20.19%	310	2.77%	6,373	56.85%	11,211
Totals	4,617,886	48.60%	4,504,975	47.41%	379,886	3.99%	112,911	1.19%	9,502,747

Counties that flipped from Democratic to Republican

- Jefferson (largest city: Monticello)
- Monroe (largest city: Key West)
- Pinellas (largest city: St. Petersburg)
- St. Lucie (largest city: Port St. Lucie)

==== By congressional district ====
Trump won 14 of 27 congressional districts, while Clinton won 13, including two held by Republicans.

District	Trump	Clinton	Representative
1st	68%	28%	Jeff Miller
1st	68%	28%	Matt Gaetz
2nd	66%	31%	Gwen Graham
2nd	66%	31%	Neal Dunn
3rd	56%	40%	Ted Yoho
4th	62%	34%	Ander Crenshaw
4th	62%	34%	John Rutherford
5th	36%	61%	Corrine Brown
5th	36%	61%	Al Lawson
6th	57%	40%	Ron DeSantis
7th	44%	51%	John Mica
7th	44%	51%	Stephanie Murphy
8th	58%	38%	Bill Posey
9th	42%	55%	Alan Grayson
9th	42%	55%	Darren Soto
10th	35%	62%	Daniel Webster
10th	35%	62%	Val Demings
11th	65%	33%	Rich Nugent
11th	65%	33%	Daniel Webster
12th	57%	39%	Gus Bilirakis
13th	46%	50%	David Jolly
13th	46%	50%	Charlie Crist
14th	39%	57%	Kathy Castor
15th	53%	43%	Dennis Ross
16th	54%	43%	Vern Buchanan
17th	62%	35%	Tom Rooney
18th	53%	44%	Patrick Murphy
18th	53%	44%	Brian Mast
19th	60%	38%	Curt Clawson
19th	60%	38%	Francis Rooney
20th	18%	80%	Alcee Hastings
21st	39%	59%	Lois Frankel
22nd	41%	57%	Ted Deutch
23rd	36%	62%	Debbie Wasserman Schultz
24th	16%	81%	Frederica Wilson
25th	50%	48%	Mario Díaz-Balart
26th	41%	57%	Carlos Curbelo
27th	39%	59%	Ileana Ros-Lehtinen

== Analysis ==
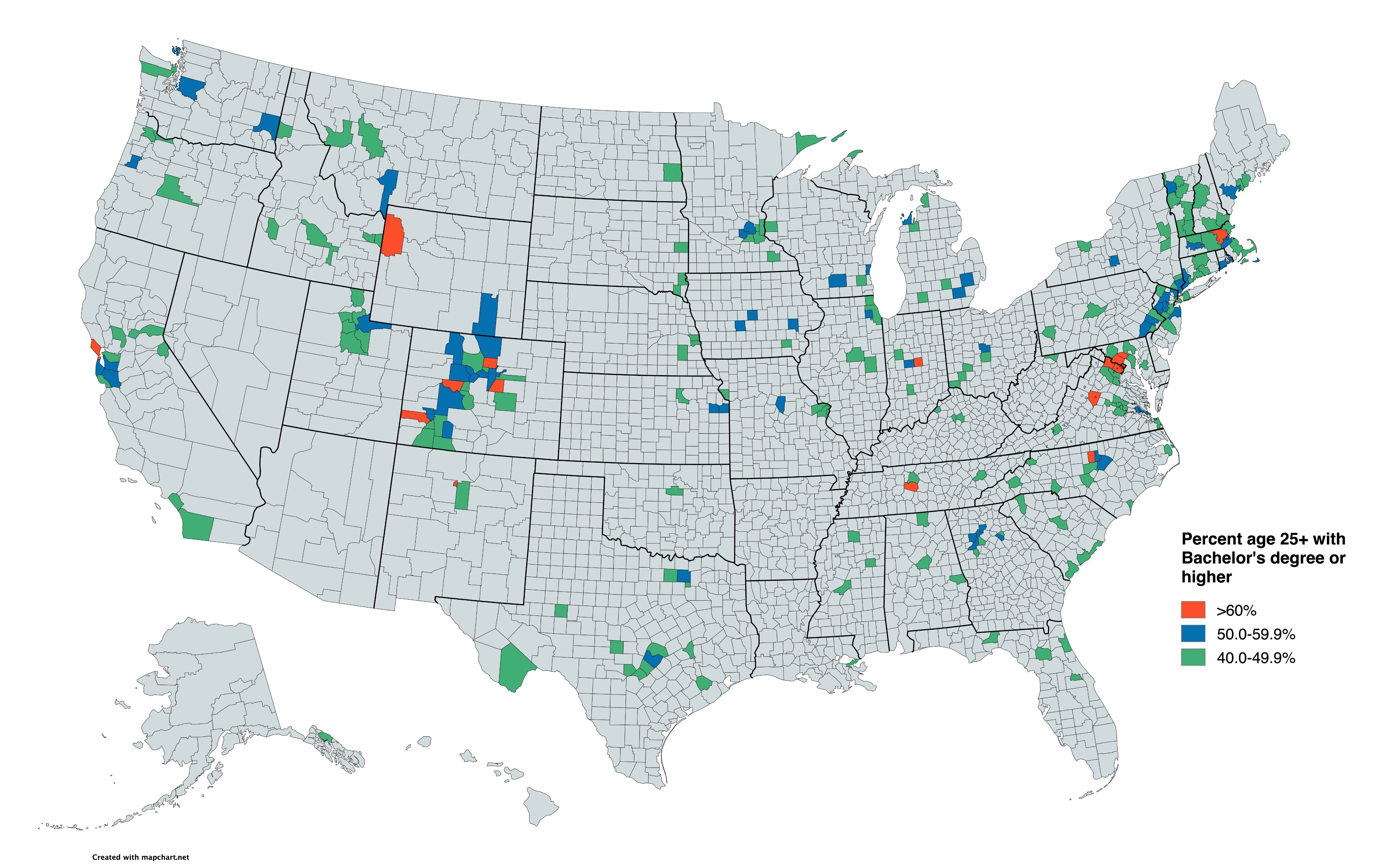
A map of the most college-educated counties in the United States

Despite losing the state, Clinton's 63.22% vote share in majority-Hispanic Miami-Dade County remains the highest of any Democratic nominee since 1964. Clinton still lost the state despite outperforming Obama in Miami-Dade. The state's most populous county, Miami-Dade swung rightward over Trump's three elections, and by 2024 Trump won an outright majority of the vote in the county.

Clinton's gains in Miami-Dade were insufficient to win Florida, as Trump gained in most of the rest of the state. The state swung about 2% rightward from 2012, with Clinton’s gains among Hispanics and college-educated whites not enough to overcome Trump’s gains among non-college whites. Winning Florida alone would not have been sufficient for Clinton to win the Electoral College, but it would have been had Clinton also won at least one Rust Belt state (Pennsylvania, Michigan, and Wisconsin).

Trump flipped Jefferson, Pinellas, St. Lucie, and Monroe counties. Except for Pinellas, Trump never lost any of these counties in any of his three runs. Clinton gained in the state's most educated counties (see the map), including Leon, Alachua (home to the University of Florida), St. Johns County, and Seminole County.

Clinton did not perform well enough in the state's most populous counties, particularly Broward and Palm Beach. Broward stayed static, with Clinton maintaining Obama’s 35% margin. Palm Beach outright swung rightward in 2016, and by 2024 Trump lost Palm Beach by less than 1%.

== See also ==
- United States presidential elections in Florida
- 2016 Democratic Party presidential debates and forums
- 2016 Democratic Party presidential primaries
- 2016 Republican Party presidential debates and forums
- 2016 Republican Party presidential primaries
