= 2018 Florida Chief Financial Officer election =

2018 Chief Financial Officer of Florida General Election
- November 6, 2018
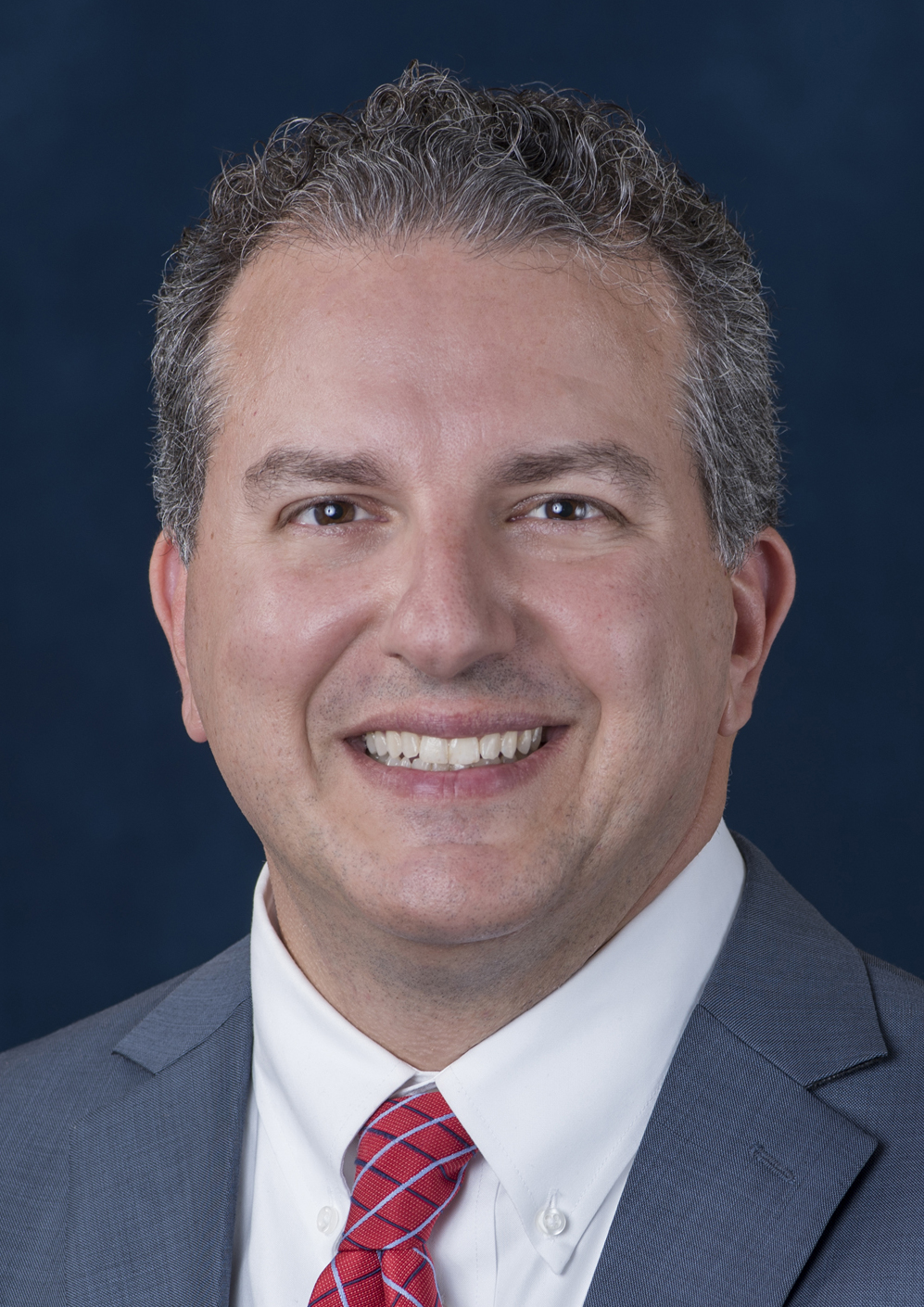

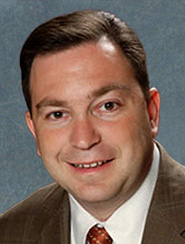
Nominee	Jimmy Patronis	Jeremy Ring
Party	Republican	Democratic
Popular vote	4,152,221	3,872,540
Percentage	51.74%	48.26%
- Patronis: 50–60% 60–70% 70–80% 80–90% >90% Ring: 50–60% 60–70% 70–80% 80–90% >90% Tie: 50% No votes
CFO before election
Jimmy Patronis
Republican
Elected CFO
Jimmy Patronis
Republican

The 2018 Florida Chief Financial Officer election took place on November 6, 2018. Incumbent Republican Chief Financial Officer Jimmy Patronis, who was appointed in 2017, successfully ran for a full term, defeating Democratic nominee Jeremy Ring, a former state senator, in the general election.

== Republican primary ==
=== Candidates ===
==== Declared ====
- Jimmy Patronis, incumbent Chief Financial Officer of Florida

==== Declined ====
- Aaron Bean, state senator
- Jeff Brandes, state senator
- Lenny Curry, Mayor of Jacksonville
- Don Gaetz, former state senator
- Tom Grady, Florida Board of Education member and former state representative
- Teresa Jacobs, Mayor of Orange County
- Jack Latvala, state senator (running for governor)
- Tom Lee, state senator and nominee in 2006
- Carlos López-Cantera, lieutenant governor and candidate for U.S. Senate in 2016
- Seth McKeel, former state representative
- Pat Neal, real estate developer and former state senator
- Will Weatherford, former Speaker of the Florida House of Representatives

=== Endorsements ===
Jimmy Patronis

U.S. Senators

- Marco Rubio, U.S. Senator (R-FL)

Statewide officials

- Jeb Bush, former governor of Florida
- Rick Scott, Governor of Florida

Organizations

- Associated Industries of Florida
- Florida Chamber of Commerce
- National Federation of Independent Business

== Democratic primary ==
=== Candidates ===
==== Declared ====
- Jeremy Ring, former state senator

==== Declined ====
- Kevin Beckner, former Hillsborough County Commissioner
- Bob Buckhorn, Mayor of Tampa
- Patrick Murphy, former U.S. Representative and nominee for U.S. Senate in 2016
- Jack Seiler, Mayor of Fort Lauderdale

=== Endorsements ===
Jeremy Ring

U.S. Representatives

- Ted Deutch, U.S. Representative (FL-22)
- Lois Frankel, U.S. Representative (FL-21)
- Alcee Hastings, U.S. Representative (FL-20)
- Al Lawson, U.S. Representative (FL-05)
- Patrick Murphy, former U.S. Representative (FL-18), Democratic nominee for U.S. Senate in 2016
- Darren Soto, U.S. Representative (FL-09)
- Debbie Wasserman Schultz, U.S. Representative (FL-23)
- Frederica Wilson, U.S. Representative (FL-24)

Statewide officials

- Alex Sink, former Chief Financial Officer of Florida, Democratic nominee for Governor in 2010

State legislators

- Joseph Abruzzo, State Representative (D-Boynton Beach)
- Lori Berman, State Representative (D-Lantana)
- Randolph Bracy, State Senator (D-Orlando)
- Oscar Braynon, State Senator (D-Miami Gardens)
- Ben Diamond, State Representative (D-St. Petersburg)
- Bobby DuBose, State Representative (D-Fort Lauderdale)
- Katie Edwards, State Representative (D-Plantation)
- Gary Farmer, State Senator (D-Fort Lauderdale)
- Joe Geller, State Representative (D-Aventura)
- Audrey Gibson, State Senator (D-Jacksonville)
- Evan Jenne, State Representative (D-Hollywood)
- Shevrin D. Jones, State Representative (D-West Park)
- Kionne McGhee, State Representative (D-Miami)
- Bill Montford, State Senator (D-Tallahassee)
- Kevin Rader, State Representative (D-Delray Beach)
- Darryl Rouson, State Senator (D-St. Petersburg)
- Sean Shaw, State Representative (D-Tampa)
- Rick Stark, State Representative (D-Weston)
- Perry Thurston, State Senator (D-Fort Lauderdale)

Mayors and other municipal officials

- Buddy Dyer, Mayor of Orlando
- Jack Seiler, Mayor of Fort Lauderdale

Other individuals

- John Morgan, lawyer and Democratic fundraiser

Organizations

- Florida Professional Firefighters

== General election ==
=== Polling ===
Poll source	Date(s) administered	Sample size	Margin of error	Jimmy Patronis (R)	Jeremy Ring (D)	Undecided
Gravis Marketing	October 22–23, 2018	773	± 3.5%	41%	44%	15%
Public Policy Polling	September 27–28, 2018	538	—	34%	40%	26%
Cherry Communications	September 19–24, 2018	622	± 4.4%	38%	38%	20%
Gravis Marketing	August 29–30, 2018	1,225	± 2.8%	41%	40%	19%
Gravis Marketing	July 13–14, 2018	1,840	± 2.3%	34%	33%	32%
Public Policy Polling	June 18–19, 2018	1,308	—	34%	39%	27%
Cherry Communications	May 25 – June 4, 2018	605	± 4%	40%	31%	29%
EMC Research	November 12–16, 2017	705	± 3.7%	35%	37%	28%

=== Results ===
Florida Chief Financial Officer election, 2018
Party	Candidate	Votes	%	±%
Republican	Jimmy Patronis (incumbent)	4,152,221	51.74%	−7.19%
Democratic	Jeremy Ring	3,872,540	48.26%	+7.19%
Total votes		8,025,058	100.0%	N/A
Republican hold				

==== By congressional district ====
Patronis won 14 of 27 congressional districts.

District	Patronis	Ring	Representative
1st	70%	30%	Matt Gaetz
2nd	69%	30%	Neal Dunn
3rd	58%	42%	Ted Yoho
4th	65%	35%	John Rutherford
5th	37%	63%	Al Lawson
6th	59%	41%	Ron DeSantis
6th	59%	41%	Mike Waltz
7th	48%	52%	Stephanie Murphy
8th	60%	40%	Bill Posey
9th	46%	54%	Darren Soto
10th	38%	61%	Val Demings
11th	66%	33%	Daniel Webster
12th	59%	41%	Gus Bilirakis
13th	48%	52%	Charlie Crist
14th	43%	57%	Kathy Castor
15th	55%	45%	Dennis Ross
15th	55%	45%	Ross Spano
16th	56%	44%	Vern Buchanan
17th	64%	36%	Tom Rooney
17th	64%	36%	Greg Steube
18th	54%	46%	Brian Mast
19th	63%	37%	Francis Rooney
20th	18%	82%	Alcee Hastings
21st	39%	60%	Lois Frankel
22nd	41%	59%	Ted Deutch
23rd	37%	62%	Debbie Wasserman Schultz
24th	17%	83%	Frederica Wilson
25th	59%	41%	Mario Díaz-Balart
26th	47%	52%	Carlos Curbelo
26th	47%	52%	Debbie Mucarsel-Powell
27th	46%	54%	Ileana Ros-Lehtinen
27th	46%	54%	Donna Shalala
