= 2024 United States Senate election in Florida =

- November 5, 2024
- Turnout: 78.9% ▲
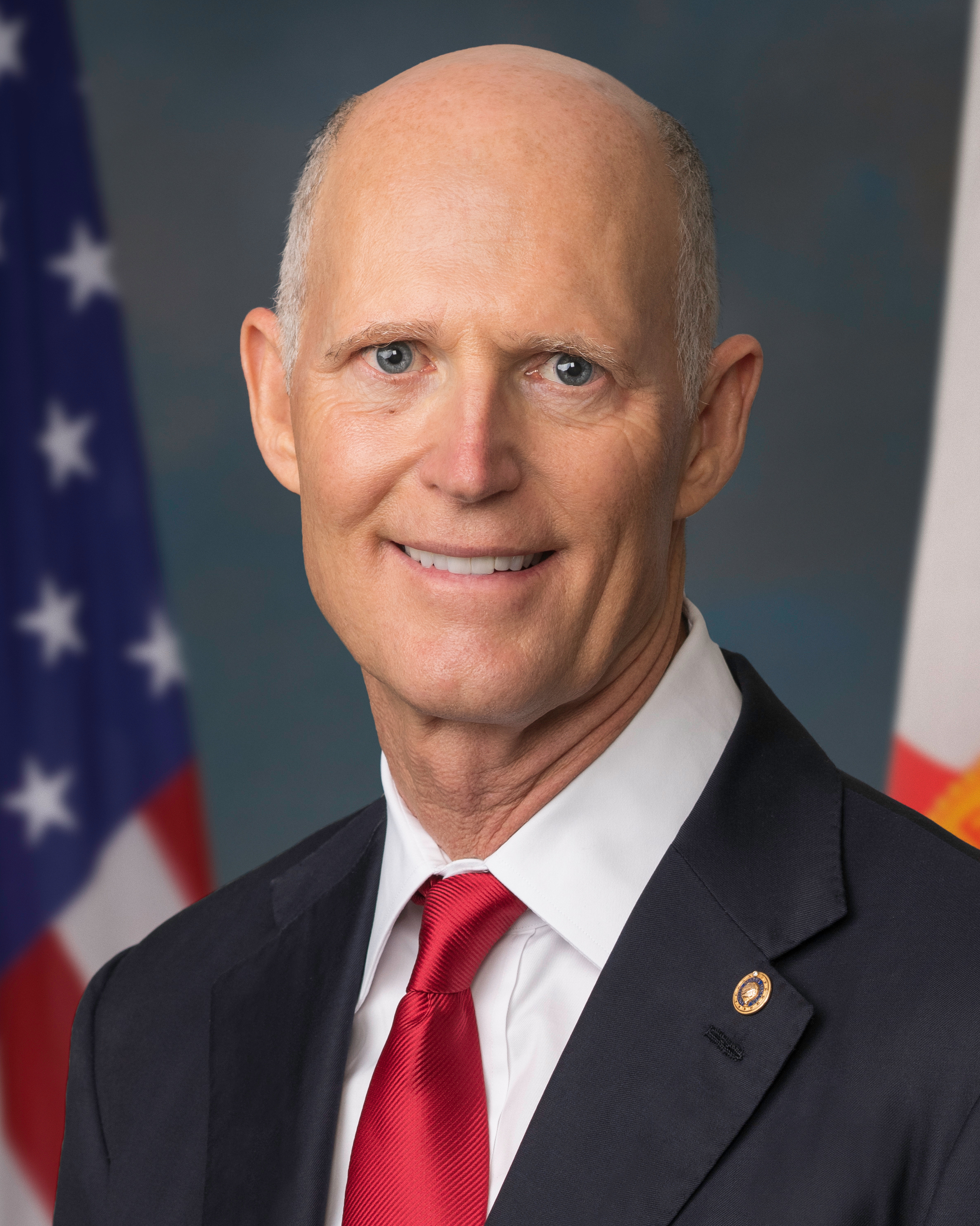

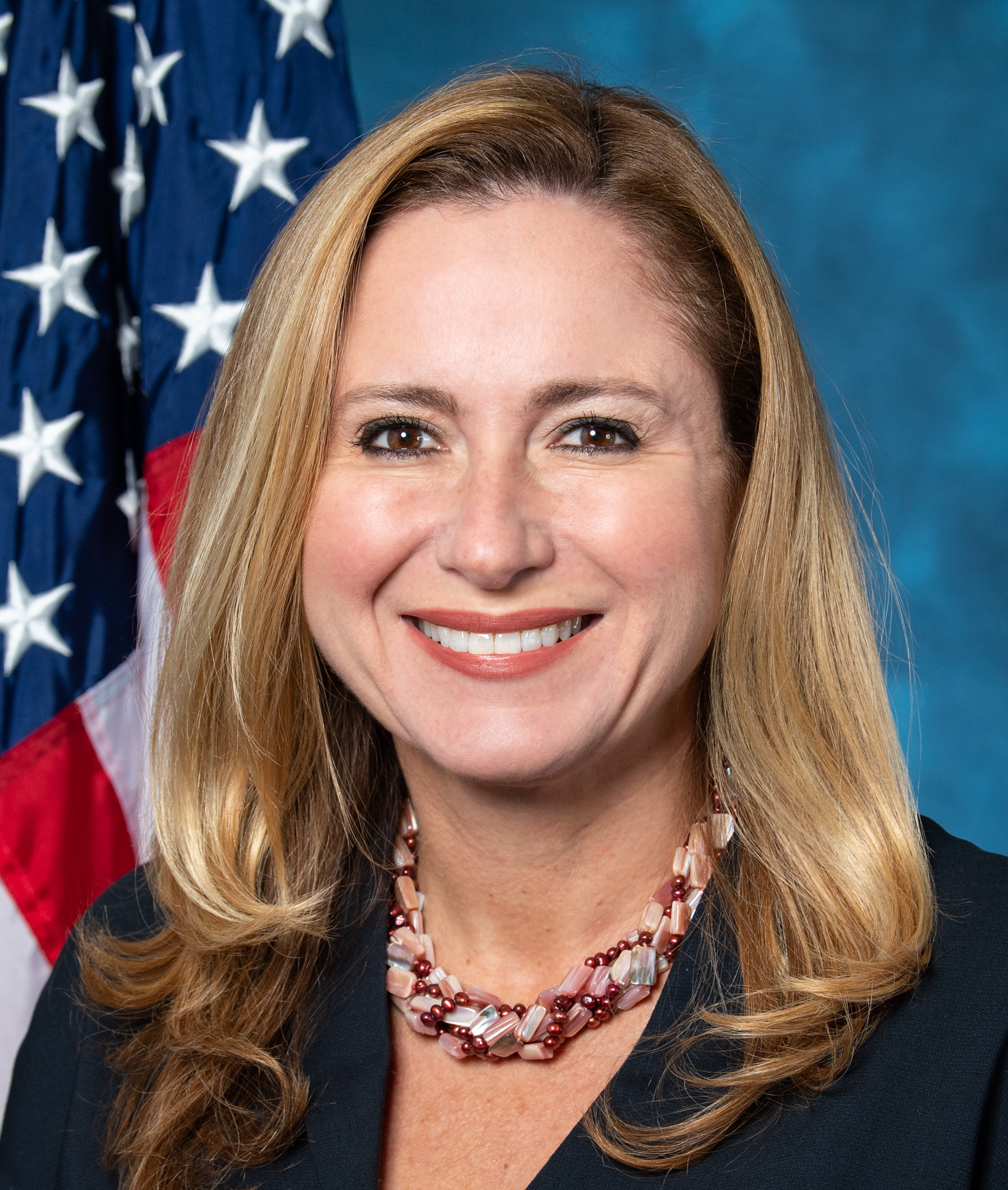
Nominee	Rick Scott	Debbie Mucarsel-Powell
Party	Republican	Democratic
Popular vote	5,977,706	4,603,077
Percentage	55.57%	42.79%
- Scott: 40–50% 50–60% 60–70% 70–80% 80–90% >90% Mucarsel-Powell: 40–50% 50–60% 60–70% 70–80% 80–90% >90% Tie: 40–50% 50% No data
U.S. senator before election
Rick Scott
Republican
Elected U.S. senator
Rick Scott
Republican

The 2024 United States Senate election in Florida was held on November 5, 2024, to elect a member of the United States Senate to represent the state of Florida. Incumbent Republican Senator Rick Scott won a second term, defeating Democratic nominee Debbie Mucarsel-Powell. The primary election was held on August 20, 2024.

Scott, then the governor of Florida, was first elected to the U.S. Senate in 2018 by 0.12 points, defeating then-incumbent Bill Nelson. With the benefit of incumbency and the state's rightward trend, most political pundits considered the race to be favoring Scott to win re-election. On Election Day, Scott won by 12.78 percentage points, a significantly larger margin than most pre-election polls had suggested.

Out of all of Scott’s four statewide races (2010 and 2014 gubernatorial elections, 2018 and 2024 senatorial elections), this election was by far his best performance, and the first one he won decisively, as he narrowly won the previous three all by less than a 2% margin. Scott won majority-Hispanic Miami-Dade and Osceola counties, as well as St. Lucie County for the first time in all of his statewide races, and according to exit polls Scott won 55% of Hispanic voters and also won 21% of African American voters.

== Republican primary ==
=== Candidates ===
==== Nominee ====
- Rick Scott, incumbent U.S. senator (2019–present)

==== Eliminated in primary ====
- John Columbus, actor
- Keith Gross, former assistant state attorney for Florida's 18th circuit court

==== Declined ====
- Ron DeSantis, governor of Florida (2019–present) and former U.S. representative from Florida's 6th congressional district (2013–2018) (ran for president)
- Byron Donalds, U.S. representative from Florida's 19th congressional district (2021–present) (ran for re-election)
- Matt Gaetz, U.S. representative from Florida's 1st congressional district (2017–2024) (ran for re-election)

=== Endorsements ===
Keith Gross

Organizations

- Republican Liberty Caucus
Rick Scott

U.S. executive branch officials

- John Bolton, United States National Security Advisor (2018–2019), United States Ambassador to the United Nations (2005–2006)
- Mike Pompeo, U.S. Secretary of State (2018–2021), Director of the CIA (2017–2018), and U.S. representative for Kansas's 4th congressional district (2011–2017)
- Donald Trump, 45th president of the United States (2017–2021)

U.S. senators

- Norm Coleman, former U.S. senator from Minnesota (2003–2009)
- Marco Rubio, U.S. senator from Florida (2011–2025)

U.S. representatives

- 19 Republican U.S. representatives from Florida

Governors

- Luis Fortuño, former governor of Puerto Rico (2009–2013)

Statewide officials

- Pam Bondi, former Florida attorney general (2011–2019)
- Ashley Moody, Florida attorney general (2019–2025)
- Wilton Simpson, Florida Commissioner of Agriculture (2023–present)

State legislators

- 81 state legislators

Territorial legislators

- Keren Riquelme, member of the Senate of Puerto Rico

Local officials

- 11 state attorneys
- 59 county sheriffs
- 115 county commissioners

Organizations

- 60 Plus Association
- American Israel Public Affairs Committee (AIPAC)
- Associated Builders and Contractors of Florida
- Club for Growth
- Florida Association of Realtors
- Florida Police Chiefs Association
- National Association of Home Builders
- National Federation of Independent Business
- Republican Jewish Coalition
- Senate Conservatives Fund

=== Fundraising ===
Campaign finance reports as of June 30, 2024
Candidate	Raised	Spent	Cash on hand
John Columbus (R)	$23,174	$22,857	$317
Keith Gross (R)	$2,449,122 (Note: $2,255,605 of this total was self-funded by Gross)	$2,440,444	$8,679
Rick Scott (R)	$29,350,647 (Note: $12,563,834 of this total was self-funded by Scott)	$26,466,192	$4,345,058
Source: Federal Election Commission

=== Results ===
Results by county: Scott: 70–80%; 80–90%

Republican primary results
Party	Candidate	Votes	%
Republican	Rick Scott (incumbent)	1,283,904	84.38%
Republican	Keith Gross	142,392	9.36%
Republican	John Columbus	95,342	6.26%
Total votes		1,521,638	100.0%

== Democratic primary ==
=== Candidates ===
==== Nominee ====
- Debbie Mucarsel-Powell, former U.S. representative from Florida's 26th congressional district (2019–2021)

==== Eliminated in primary ====
- Stanley Campbell, IT company CEO and brother of rapper Uncle Luke
- Rod Joseph, consultant and Purple Heart recipient
- Brian Rush, former state representative (1987–1995) and candidate for U.S. Senate in 2022

==== Withdrew ====
- Phil Ehr, nonprofit executive, nominee for Florida's 1st congressional district in 2020 and candidate in 2018 (ran for U.S. House, endorsed Mucarsel-Powell)
- Alan Grayson, former U.S. representative from Florida's 9th congressional district (2009–2011, 2013–2017) and perennial candidate (Note: Candidate for the U.S. Senate in 2016 and 2022; candidate for Florida's 9th congressional district in 2018; write-in candidate for Florida's 6th congressional district in 2020; candidate for Florida's 10th congressional district in 2022) (ran for state senate)

==== Declined ====
- Stephanie Murphy, former U.S. Representative from Florida's 7th congressional district (2017-2023)
- Sheila Cherfilus-McCormick, U.S. representative from Florida's 20th congressional district (2022–present) (ran for re-election)
- Fentrice Driskell, Minority Leader of the Florida House of Representatives (2022–present) from the 67th district (2018–present)
- Anna Eskamani, state representative (2018–present) (ran for re-election)
- Lois Frankel, U.S. representative from Florida's 22nd congressional district (2013–present) (ran for re-election, endorsed Mucarsel-Powell)
- Shevrin Jones, state senator from the 35th district (2021–present) (endorsed Mucarsel-Powell)
- Debbie Wasserman Schultz, U.S. representative from Florida's 25th congressional district (2004–present) (endorsed Mucarsel-Powell)
- Frederica Wilson, U.S. representative from Florida's 24th congressional district (2011–present)

=== Endorsements ===
Stanley Campbell

State legislators

- Tony Hill, former state senator (2002–2011)

Local officials

- Wayne Messam, mayor of Miramar (2015–present)
- Hazelle Rogers, Broward County commissioner and former state representative (2012–2016)

Labor unions

- Florida AFL–CIO
Rod Joseph

Organizations

- Vote Common Good
Debbie Mucarsel-Powell

Federal officials

- Joe Biden, 46th president of the United States (2021–2025)

U.S. representatives

- Kathy Castor, U.S. representative from Florida's 14th congressional district (Note: Numbered as the 11th from 2007–2013) (2007–present)
- Val Demings, U.S. representative from Florida's 10th congressional district (2017–2023)
- Lois Frankel, U.S. representative from Florida's 22nd congressional district (Note: Numbered as the 22nd from 2013–2017 & the 21st from 2017–2023) (2013–present)
- Maxwell Frost, U.S. representative from Florida's 10th congressional district (2023–present)
- Gabby Giffords, U.S. representative from Arizona's 8th congressional district (2007–2012)
- Hakeem Jeffries, House Minority Leader (2023–present) from New York's 8th congressional district (2013–present)
- Al Lawson, U.S. representative from Florida's 5th congressional district (2017–2023)
- Debbie Wasserman Schultz, U.S. representative from Florida's 25th congressional district (Note: Numbered as the 20th from 2005–2013 & the 23rd from 2013–2023) (2005–present)

State legislators

- 6 state senators
- 24 state representatives

Labor unions

- AFSCME
- SEIU Florida

Organizations

- Brady PAC
- CHC BOLD PAC
- Council for a Livable World
- Democratic Senatorial Campaign Committee
- EMILY's List
- End Citizens United
- Feminist Majority PAC
- Giffords
- Human Rights Campaign
- Jewish Democratic Council of America
- Latino Victory Fund
- League of Conservation Voters
- National Committee to Preserve Social Security and Medicare PAC
- Peace Action
- Planned Parenthood Action Fund
- PODER PAC
- Reproductive Freedom for All
- Vote Mama

=== Fundraising ===
Campaign finance reports as of June 30, 2024
Candidate	Raised	Spent	Cash on hand
Stanley Campbell (D)	$1,081,092 (Note: $1,000,000 of this total was self-funded by Campbell)	$687,145	$394,415
Rod Joseph (D)	$28,596	$20,855	$7,741
Alan Grayson (D) (Note: Withdrawn candidate. Fundraising numbers as of March 31, 2024.)	$728,813 (Note: $454,105 of this total was self-funded by Grayson)	$582,703	$150,148
Debbie Mucarsel-Powell (D)	$12,133,366	$7,802,905	$4,330,461
Brian Rush (D)	$82,333 (Note: $12,000 of this total was self-funded by Rush)	$63,529	$18,804
Source: Federal Election Commission

=== Polling ===
Hypothetical polling

Poll source	Date(s) administered	Sample size (Note: Key: A – all adults RV – registered voters LV – likely voters V – unclear)	Margin of error	Alan Grayson	Debbie Mucarsel- Powell	Undecided
Mainstreet Research/FAU	June 8–9, 2024	346 (RV)	± 3.3%	12%	43%	45%

=== Results ===
Results by county: Mucarsel-Powell: 40–50%; 50–60%; 60–70%; 70–80%; 80–90%; Campbell: 30–40%; 40–50%

Democratic primary results
Party	Candidate	Votes	%
Democratic	Debbie Mucarsel-Powell	747,397	68.50%
Democratic	Stanley Campbell	213,777	19.59%
Democratic	Brian Rush	73,013	6.69%
Democratic	Rod Joseph	56,961	5.22%
Total votes		1,091,148	100.0%

== Independents and third-party candidates ==
=== Candidates ===
==== Declared ====
- Feena Bonoan (Libertarian), artist and nominee for U.S. Senate in Hawaii in 2022
- Ben Everidge (Independent), fundraising consultant and former legislative consultant to U.S. Senators Lawton Chiles and Ben Nelson
- Howard Knepper (write-in), real estate developer and perennial candidate
- Tuan Nguyen (Independent), system engineer and candidate for U.S. Senate in 2022

== General election ==
=== Predictions ===
Source	Ranking	As of
The Cook Political Report	Likely R	November 9, 2023
Inside Elections	Likely R	September 26, 2024
Sabato's Crystal Ball	Likely R	November 9, 2023
Decision Desk HQ/The Hill	Lean R	August 26, 2024
Elections Daily	Likely R	May 4, 2023
CNalysis	Likely R	September 26, 2024
RealClearPolitics	Lean R	October 15, 2024
Split Ticket	Lean R	October 23, 2024
538	Likely R	October 23, 2024

=== Post-primary endorsements ===
Rick Scott (R)

Individuals

- Vivek Ramaswamy, pharmaceutical executive and candidate for president in 2024

Organizations

- Florida Fraternal Order of Police
Debbie Mucarsel-Powell (D)

Federal officials

- Barack Obama, former president of the United States (2009–2017)

Statewide officials

- Alex Sink, former Chief Financial Officer of Florida (2007–2011)
- Gretchen Whitmer, governor of Michigan (2019–present)

State legislators

- Dianne Hart, state representative
- Katherine Waldron, state representative

Local officials

- John Dailey, mayor of Tallahassee
- Jerry Demings, mayor of Orange County
- Daniella Levine Cava, mayor of Miami-Dade County
- Dean Trantalis, mayor of Fort Lauderdale

Labor unions

- Florida AFL–CIO

=== Polling ===
Aggregate polls

Source of poll aggregation	Dates administered	Dates updated	Rick Scott (R)	Debbie Mucarsel- Powell (D)	Undecided (Note: Calculated by taking the difference of 100% and all other candidates combined.)	Margin
FiveThirtyEight	through November 3, 2024	November 4, 2024	49.6%	44.9%	5.5%	Scott +4.7%
RealClearPolitics	September 29 – November 1, 2024	November 3, 2024	48.9%	44.3%	6.8%	Scott +4.6%
270toWin	October 23 – November 4, 2024	November 4, 2024	49.3%	44.5%	6.2%	Scott +4.8%
TheHill/DDHQ	November 3, 2024	November 4, 2024	50.8%	45.4%	3.8%	Scott +5.4%
Average			49.7%	44.8%	5.5%	Scott+4.9%

Poll source	Date(s) administered	Sample size	Margin of error	Rick Scott (R)	Debbie Mucarsel- Powell (D)	Other	Undecided
Research Co.	November 2–3, 2024	450 (LV)	± 4.6%	50%	43%	3% (Note: "Some other candidate" with 3%)	4%
Victory Insights (R)	November 1–2, 2024	400 (LV)	–	51%	47%	–	2%
Stetson University	October 25 – November 1, 2024	452 (LV)	± 5.0%	53%	45%	2% (Note: "Someone else" with 2%)	–
Morning Consult	October 23 – November 1, 2024	2,022 (LV)	± 2.0%	48%	45%	–	7%
Cygnal (R)	October 26–28, 2024	600 (LV)	± 4.0%	49%	45%	3% (Note: Bonoan (L) with 2%; Everidge (I) with 1%; Nguyen (I) with 0%)	3%
Mainstreet Research/FAU	October 19–27, 2024	897 (LV)	± 3.2%	50%	46%	2% (Note: "Another candidate" with 2%)	2%
Mainstreet Research/FAU	October 19–27, 2024	913 (RV)	± 3.2%	50%	46%	2%	3%
ActiVote	October 17–27, 2024	400 (LV)	± 4.9%	55%	45%	–	–
St. Pete Polls (Note: Poll sponsored by Florida Politics)	October 23–25, 2024	1,227 (LV)	± 2.8%	49%	46%	–	6%
Emerson College (Note: Poll sponsored by The Hill)	October 18–20, 2024	860 (LV)	± 3.3%	53%	47%	–	–
Emerson College	October 18–20, 2024	860 (LV)	± 3.3%	48%	44%	–	8%
Cherry Communications (R) (Note: Poll sponsored by Florida Chamber of Commerce)	October 10–20, 2024	614 (LV)	± 4.0%	51%	45%	–	4%
ActiVote	September 23 – October 20, 2024	400 (LV)	± 4.9%	52%	48%	–	–
Redfield & Wilton Strategies (Note: Poll sponsored by The Daily Telegraph)	October 16–18, 2024	1,275 (LV)	± 2.5%	45%	42%	5% (Note: "Won't vote if these are the candidates" with 2%, Bonoan (L) with 2%; "Other" with 1%)	8%
University of North Florida	October 7–18, 2024	977 (LV)	± 3.5%	49%	46%	1% (Note: "Someone else" with 1%)	4%
RMG Research (Note: Poll sponsored by Napolitan News)	October 14–17, 2024	788 (LV)	± 3.5%	51%	43%	3% (Note: "Someone else" with 3%)	3%
RMG Research	October 14–17, 2024	788 (LV)	± 3.5%	52% (Note: With voters who lean towards a given candidate)	44%	–	3%
YouGov (Note: Poll sponsored by Rose Institute of State and Local Government)	October 7–17, 2024	1,094 (RV)	± 3.46%	49%	45%	–	6%
Redfield & Wilton Strategies	October 12–14, 2024	1,009 (LV)	± 2.8%	45%	42%	6% (Note: "Won't vote if these are the candidates" with 3%, Bonoan (L) with 2%; "Other" with 1%)	8%
Marist College	October 3–7, 2024	1,257 (LV)	± 3.6%	50%	48%	–	1%
Marist College	October 3–7, 2024	1,410 (RV)	± 3.4%	50%	48%	–	2%
New York Times/Siena College	September 29 – October 6, 2024	622 (LV)	± 4.8%	49%	40%	–	11%
New York Times/Siena College	September 29 – October 6, 2024	622 (RV)	± 4.6%	48%	39%	–	12%
Mason-Dixon Polling & Strategy (Note: Poll sponsored by NBC6 & Telemundo 51)	October 1–4, 2024	625 (RV)	± 4.0%	48%	41%	2%	9%
Redfield & Wilton Strategies	September 27 – October 2, 2024	2,946 (LV)	± 1.7%	44%	41%	4% (Note: "Won't vote if these are the candidates" with 2%; Bonoan (L) with 1%; "Other: with 1%)	10%
RMG Research	September 25–27, 2024	774 (LV)	± 3.5%	48%	43%	2% (Note: "Someone else" & "Would not vote" with 1% each)	7%
RMG Research	September 25–27, 2024	774 (LV)	± 3.5%	50%	44%	–	5%
Public Policy Polling (D) (Note: Poll sponsored by Clean and Prosperous America PAC, which supports Democratic candidates)	September 25–26, 2024	808 (RV)	± 3.5%	47%	44%	–	9%
Public Policy Polling (D)	September 25–26, 2024	808 (RV)	± 3.5%	44%	43%	2% (Note: Bonoan (L) with 2%)	12%
McLaughlin & Associates (R) (Note: Poll sponsored by Associated Industries of Florida)	September 23–25, 2024	1,200 (LV)	± 2.8%	51%	44%	–	5%
Victory Insights (R)	September 22–25, 2024	600 (LV)	± 4.4%	45%	44%	–	12%
The Bullfinch Group (Note: Poll sponsored by The Independent Center)	September 20–23, 2024	600 (RV)	± 4.0%	46%	44%	–	10%
The Bullfinch Group	September 20–23, 2024	600 (RV)	± 4.0%	43%	42%	4%	11%
ActiVote	August 21 – September 22, 2024	400 (LV)	± 4.9%	54%	46%	–	–
Redfield & Wilton Strategies	September 16–19, 2024	1,602 (LV)	± 2.3%	45%	41%	3% (Note: Bonoan (L) with 1%; "Other" with 1%; "Won't vote" with 1%)	11%
Morning Consult	September 9–18, 2024	2,948 (LV)	± 2.0%	46%	42%	–	12%
Morning Consult	August 30 – September 8, 2024	3,182 (LV)	± 2.0%	47%	42%	–	11%
Emerson College	September 3–5, 2024	815 (LV)	± 3.4%	46%	45%	–	9%
Redfield & Wilton Strategies	August 25–28, 2024	850 (LV)	± 3.1%	43%	40%	4% (Note: Bonoan (L) with 1%; "Other" with 1%; "Won't vote" with 2%)	14%
Cherry Communications (R)	August 15–26, 2024	600 (LV)	± 4.0%	51%	44%	–	5%
Public Policy Polling (D)	August 21–22, 2024	837 (RV)	± 3.4%	48%	45%	–	7%
Public Policy Polling (D)	August 21–22, 2024	837 (RV)	± 3.4%	46%	43%	2%	10%
	August 20, 2024	Primary elections held					
Mainstreet Research/FAU	August 10–11, 2024	1,055 (RV)	± 3.0%	47%	43%	11% (Note: "Another Candidate" with 4%)	7%
Mainstreet Research/FAU	August 10–11, 2024	1,040 (LV)	± 3.0%	47%	43%	3% (Note: "Another Candidate" with 3%)	6%
McLaughlin & Associates (R)	August 6–8, 2024	800 (LV)	–	52%	42%	–	7%
University of North Florida	July 24–27, 2024	774 (LV)	± 4.6%	47%	43%	– (Note: "Some other candidate" with <1%)	11%
Targoz Market Research (Note: Poll sponsored by the James Madison Institute, a conservative think tank)	July 19–24, 2024	1,200 (RV)	± 2.8%	47%	41%	–	12%
Targoz Market Research	July 19–24, 2024	988 (LV)	± 2.8%	49%	43%	–	8%
Mainstreet Research/FAU	June 8–9, 2024	883 (A)	± 3.3%	44%	40%	6% (Note: "Some other candidate" with 6%)	10%
Mainstreet Research/FAU	June 8–9, 2024	771 (LV)	± 3.3%	45%	43%	4% (Note: "Some other candidate" with 4%)	8%
The Tyson Group (R)	June 6–9, 2024	1,050 (LV)	± 3.0%	46%	33%	–	21%
CBS News/YouGov	May 10–16, 2024	1,209 (RV)	± 3.9%	45%	37%	–	19%
Cherry Communications (R)	April 28 – May 7, 2024	609 (RV)	± 4.0%	54%	39%	–	7%
Mainstreet Research/FAU	April 15–17, 2024	865 (RV)	± 3.3%	52%	35%	5% (Note: "Some other candidate" with 5%)	9%
Mainstreet Research/FAU	April 15–17, 2024	815 (LV)	± 3.3%	53%	36%	4%	8%
USA Today/Ipsos	April 5–7, 2024	1,014 (A)	± 4.1%	36%	26%	5%	33%
Emerson College	April 3–7, 2024	608 (LV)	± 3.0%	45%	38%	–	16%
Public Policy Polling (D) (Note: Poll sponsored by EMILY's List, which supports Mucarsel-Powell)	February 29 – March 1, 2024	790 (V)	± 3.5%	44%	41%	–	–
Global Strategy Group (D) (Note: Poll sponsored by the DSCC)	July 5–10, 2023	1,000 (LV)	± 3.1%	43%	44%	–	13%

Hypothetical polling

Rick Scott vs. Phil Ehr

Poll source	Date(s) administered	Sample size	Margin of error	Rick Scott (R)	Phil Ehr (D)	Other	Undecided
Change Research (D) (Note: Poll sponsored by Ehr's campaign)	June 27–29, 2023	1,298 (LV)	–	45%	41%	3% (Note: "Would not vote" with 3%)	11%

=== Results ===
Scott won reelection with 55.6% of the vote, defeating Mucarsel-Powell by over 12 percentage points.

2024 United States Senate election in Florida
Party	Candidate	Votes	%	±%
Republican	Rick Scott (incumbent)	5,977,706	55.57%	+5.52%
Democratic	Debbie Mucarsel-Powell	4,603,077	42.79%	−7.14%
Independent	Ben Everidge	62,683	0.58%	N/A
Libertarian	Feena Bonoan	57,363	0.53%	N/A
Independent	Tuan TQ Nguyen	56,586	0.53%	N/A
Write-in		13	0.00%	–0.01%
Total votes		10,757,428	100.00%	N/A
Republican hold				

==== By county ====
County	Rick Scott Republican		Debbie Mucarsel-Powell Democratic		Various candidates Other parties		Margin		Total
County	#	%	#	%	#	%	#	%	Total
Alachua	54,458	40.3%	78,314	57.9%	2,436	1.9%	-23,856	-17.6%	135,208
Baker	12,415	83.9%	2,161	14.6%	221	1.5%	10,254	69.3%	14,797
Bay	72,045	74.2%	22,988	23.7%	2,032	2.2%	49,057	50.5%	97,065
Bradford	10,363	76.1%	3,005	22.1%	249	1.8%	7,358	54.0%	13,617
Brevard	209,204	58.5%	140,412	39.3%	8,022	2.3%	68,792	19.2%	357,638
Broward	338,969	39.3%	512,458	59.4%	11,248	1.2%	-173,489	-20.1%	862,675
Calhoun	5,280	82.9%	976	15.3%	113	1.8%	4,304	67.6%	6,369
Charlotte	82,377	67.4%	38,154	31.2%	1,680	1.3%	44,223	36.2%	122,221
Citrus	66,837	69.0%	27,975	28.9%	2,062	2.1%	38,862	40.1%	96,877
Clay	86,368	68.7%	37,009	29.4%	2,399	2.0%	49,359	39.3%	125,776
Collier	150,015	69.6%	63,988	29.7%	1,580	0.7%	86,027	39.9%	215,583
Columbia	24,400	73.5%	8,283	24.9%	536	1.6%	16,117	48.6%	33,219
DeSoto	8,708	70.7%	3,378	27.4%	225	1.8%	5,330	43.3%	12,311
Dixie	6,673	83.4%	1,169	14.6%	160	2.0%	5,504	68.8%	8,002
Duval	232,168	50.1%	223,191	48.1%	8,324	1.8%	8,977	2.0%	463,683
Escambia	98,502	60.9%	60,111	37.2%	3,108	1.9%	38,391	23.7%	161,721
Flagler	49,683	63.0%	28,051	35.5%	1,179	1.5%	21,632	26.5%	78,913
Franklin	4,814	71.6%	1,795	26.7%	115	1.7%	3,019	44.9%	6,724
Gadsden	8,221	37.8%	13,192	60.7%	333	1.5%	-4,971	-22.9%	21,746
Gilchrist	8,740	82.7%	1,617	15.3%	207	2.0%	7,123	67.4%	10,564
Glades	3,987	76.1%	1,161	22.1%	94	1.8%	2,826	54.0%	5,242
Gulf	6,745	78.0%	1,757	20.3%	146	1.8%	4,988	57.7%	8,648
Hamilton	3,945	69.7%	1,602	28.3%	113	2.0%	2,343	41.4%	5,660
Hardee	6,016	74.7%	1,879	23.3%	163	2.0%	4,137	51.4%	8,058
Hendry	9,215	69.5%	3,837	28.9%	204	1.5%	5,378	40.6%	13,256
Hernando	70,178	64.4%	36,545	33.5%	2,307	2.0%	33,633	30.9%	109,030
Highlands	34,858	68.0%	15,688	30.6%	713	1.4%	19,170	37.4%	51,259
Hillsborough	336,341	50.6%	316,262	47.5%	12,720	1.9%	20,079	3.1%	665,323
Holmes	8,063	89.0%	866	9.6%	132	1.5%	7,197	79.4%	9,061
Indian River	61,075	62.5%	35,299	36.1%	1,407	1.5%	25,776	26.4%	97,781
Jackson	16,033	73.0%	5,515	25.1%	415	1.9%	10,518	47.9%	21,963
Jefferson	5,118	60.5%	3,230	38.2%	107	1.2%	1,888	22.3%	8,455
Lafayette	3,183	85.5%	454	12.2%	87	2.3%	2,729	73.3%	3,724
Lake	136,284	60.9%	83,276	37.2%	4,297	2.0%	53,008	23.7%	223,857
Lee	255,340	66.3%	125,524	32.6%	4,447	1.1%	129,816	33.7%	385,311
Leon	63,554	41.0%	88,881	57.3%	2,646	1.6%	-25,327	-16.3%	155,081
Levy	17,894	74.2%	5,763	23.9%	454	1.9%	12,131	50.3%	24,111
Liberty	2,859	82.8%	539	15.6%	54	1.5%	2,320	67.2%	3,452
Madison	5,984	65.9%	2,966	32.7%	129	1.4%	3,018	33.2%	9,079
Manatee	137,928	60.9%	85,462	37.7%	3,278	1.4%	52,466	23.2%	226,668
Marion	135,179	63.9%	72,779	34.4%	3,638	1.5%	62,400	29.5%	211,416
Martin	61,948	63.7%	34,015	35.0%	1,244	1.3%	72,933	28.7%	97,207
Miami-Dade	585,445	54.4%	477,598	44.4%	13,071	1.2%	107,847	10.0%	1,076,114
Monroe	25,069	57.3%	18,227	41.6%	475	1.1%	6,842	15.7%	43,771
Nassau	47,668	73.0%	16,804	25.7%	845	1.3%	30,864	47.3%	65,317
Okaloosa	81,192	72.1%	28,850	25.6%	2,561	2.3%	52,342	46.5%	112,603
Okeechobee	11,544	73.1%	4,002	25.3%	244	1.5%	7,542	47.8%	15,790
Orange	256,770	42.8%	330,386	55.0%	13,409	2.2%	-73,616	-12.2%	600,565
Osceola	85,085	50.0%	81,586	47.9%	3,653	2.2%	3,499	2.1%	170,324
Palm Beach	356,386	48.5%	368,640	50.2%	9,213	1.2%	-12,254	-1.7%	734,239
Pasco	186,620	59.5%	119,344	38.1%	7,682	2.4%	67,276	21.4%	313,646
Pinellas	260,571	50.9%	241,729	47.3%	9,205	1.8%	18,842	3.6%	511,505
Polk	201,722	58.8%	135,475	39.5%	6,114	1.8%	66,247	19.3%	343,311
Putnam	25,621	71.5%	9,511	26.5%	696	2.0%	16,110	45.0%	35,828
St. Johns	128,463	65.7%	64,516	33.0%	2,652	1.4%	63,947	32.7%	195,631
St. Lucie	95,644	52.3%	84,650	46.3%	2,422	1.3%	10,994	6.0%	182,716
Santa Rosa	84,815	76.0%	24,555	22.0%	2,162	2.0%	60,260	54.0%	111,532
Sarasota	160,328	58.2%	111,763	40.6%	3,326	1.2%	48,565	17.6%	275,417
Seminole	127,316	50.8%	118,325	47.2%	4,886	2.0%	8,991	3.6%	250,527
Sumter	72,344	69.2%	31,273	29.9%	966	0.9%	41,071	39.3%	104,583
Suwannee	17,123	79.1%	4,073	18.8%	461	2.1%	13,050	60.3%	21,657
Taylor	7,914	80.0%	1,816	18.4%	160	1.6%	6,098	61.6%	9,893
Union	4,967	80.8%	1,053	17.1%	131	2.1%	3,914	63.7%	6,151
Volusia	179,997	58.7%	120,503	39.3%	6,103	2.1%	59,494	19.4%	306,603
Wakulla	14,013	71.3%	5,265	26.8%	372	1.9%	8,748	44.5%	19,650
Walton	38,828	78.9%	9,618	19.5%	753	1.6%	29,210	59.4%	49,199
Washington	10,294	82.3%	1,988	15.9%	233	1.9%	8,306	66.4%	12,515
Totals	5,977,706	55.6%	4,603,077	42.8%	176,645	1.6%	1,374,629	12.8%	10,757,428

Counties that flipped from Democratic to Republican

- Duval (largest municipality: Jacksonville)
- Hillsborough (largest municipality: Tampa)
- Miami-Dade (largest municipality: Miami)
- Monroe (largest city: Key West)
- St. Lucie (largest city: Port St. Lucie)
- Osceola (largest municipality: Kissimmee)
- Pinellas (largest municipality: St. Petersburg)
- Seminole (largest municipality: Sanford)

==== By congressional district ====
Scott won 20 of 28 congressional districts.

District	Scott	Mucarsel-Powell	Representative
1st	69%	29%	Matt Gaetz
2nd	60%	38%	Neal Dunn
3rd	60%	38%	Kat Cammack
4th	55%	43%	Aaron Bean
5th	60%	38%	John Rutherford
6th	63%	35%	Michael Waltz
7th	55%	43%	Cory Mills
8th	59%	38%	Bill Posey (118th Congress)
8th	59%	38%	Mike Haridopolos (119th Congress)
9th	48%	50%	Darren Soto
10th	38%	59%	Maxwell Frost
11th	58%	41%	Daniel Webster
12th	64%	34%	Gus Bilirakis
13th	54%	44%	Anna Paulina Luna
14th	46%	53%	Kathy Castor
15th	54%	44%	Laurel Lee
16th	57%	42%	Vern Buchanan
17th	62%	37%	Greg Steube
18th	63%	35%	Scott Franklin
19th	67%	32%	Byron Donalds
20th	28%	70%	Sheila Cherfilus-McCormick
21st	57%	42%	Brian Mast
22nd	46%	53%	Lois Frankel
23rd	47%	51%	Jared Moskowitz
24th	33%	65%	Frederica Wilson
25th	45%	54%	Debbie Wasserman Schultz
26th	68%	31%	Mario Díaz-Balart
27th	56%	42%	María Elvira Salazar
28th	61%	38%	Carlos A. Giménez

== Notes ==
Partisan clients
