= Florida Elections Commission =

State election commission

The Florida Election Commission (FEC) is an organisation set up in 1973 to enforce campaign finance laws in the United States' state of Florida. "The commission is composed of nine members appointed by the governor."

== See also ==
- Elections in Florida
