= Jimmy Patronis =

American politician (born 1972)

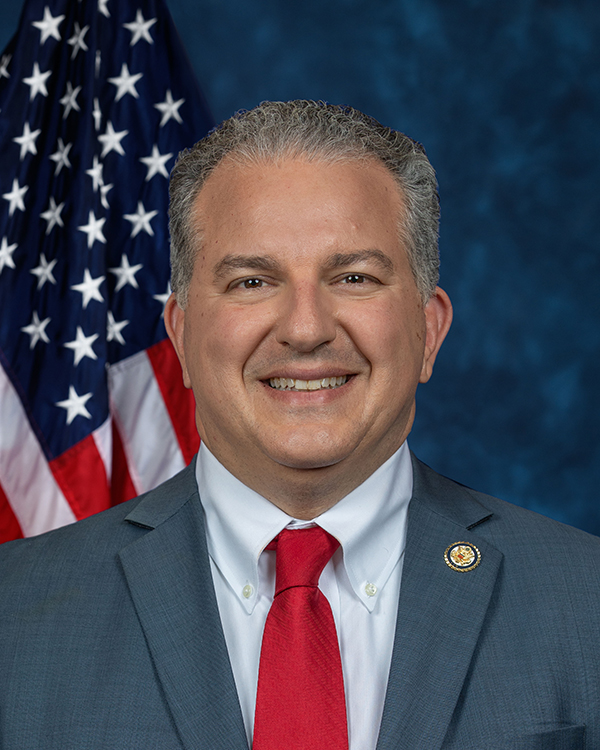
- Official portrait, 2025

Member of the U.S. House of Representatives from Florida's 1st district
- Incumbent
- Assumed office April 1, 2025 (Note: Patronis's official service begins on the date of the special election, while he was not sworn in until April 2, 2025.)
- Preceded by: Matt Gaetz

4th Chief Financial Officer of Florida
- In office June 30, 2017 – March 31, 2025
- Governor: Rick Scott; Ron DeSantis
- Preceded by: Jeff Atwater
- Succeeded by: Blaise Ingoglia

Member of the Florida Public Service Commission
- In office January 2, 2015 – June 25, 2017
- Appointed by: Rick Scott
- Preceded by: Eduardo Balbis
- Succeeded by: Gary Clark

Member of the Florida House of Representatives from the 6th district
- In office November 7, 2006 – November 4, 2014
- Preceded by: Allan Bense
- Succeeded by: Jay Trumbull

Personal details
- Born: Jimmy Theo Patronis Jr. April 13, 1972 (age 54) Panama City, Florida, U.S.
- Party: Republican
- Spouse: Katie Patronis
- Children: 2
- Education: Gulf Coast State College (AS); Florida State University (BS)
- Website: House website Campaign website

Jimmy Theo Patronis Jr. (/pətroʊnɪs/ pə-TROH-nis; born April 13, 1972) is an American politician serving as the U.S. representative for Florida's 1st congressional district since April 2025. A member of the Republican Party, he previously served as the fourth chief financial officer of Florida from 2017 to 2025. He previously served as a member of the Florida Public Service Commission from 2015 to 2017; a member of the Florida House of Representatives representing the 6th district, which includes Panama City and other parts of southern Bay County, from 2006 to 2014; and as a member of the Florida Elections Commission from 1998 to 2003.

== Early life and education ==
Patronis was born in Panama City, Florida, on April 13, 1972, of Greek descent. Patronis attended Gulf Coast Community College, where he graduated with an associate degree in restaurant management in 1994, and Florida State University, where he graduated with a bachelor's degree in political science in 1996. While at Florida State University, Patronis worked as an intern in the Florida Senate and the House of Commons of the United Kingdom.

== Early career ==
After graduation, in 1998, he was appointed by Governor Lawton Chiles to the Florida Elections Commission and again in 2001 by Governor Jeb Bush where he served until 2003. Patronis also served as chairman of the Bay County Airport Authority from 2004 to 2006.

=== Florida House of Representatives ===
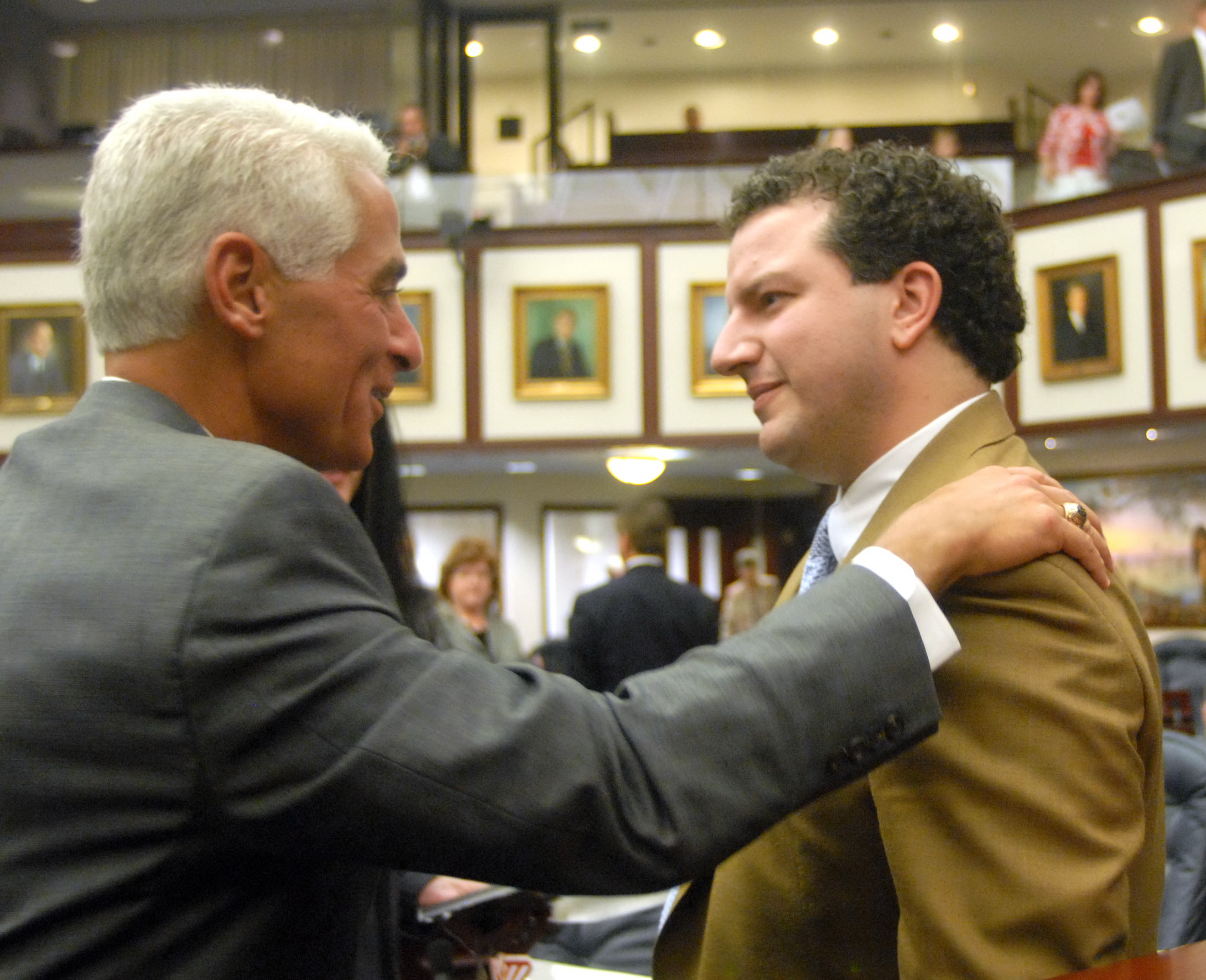
Patronis on the House floor with then-Governor Charlie Crist, 2008

Due to term limits, Allan Bense, the speaker of the Florida House of Representatives, could not seek re-election in 2006. Patronis ran to succeed him in the 6th district, which included Gulf County, southern Bay County, and western Franklin County. Patronis won the Republican primary with 39% of the vote, defeating Lee Sullivan, Cameron Floyd Skinner, and Bill Fisher. In the general election, Patronis defeated Democratic nominee Janice Lucas with 67% of the vote. He was re-elected without opposition in 2008. In 2010, he defeated Democratic nominee John McDonald with 78% of the vote.

In 2012, following the reconfiguration of districts, Patronis remained in the 6th District, but it swapped its portions in Franklin County and Gulf County for a further incursion into Bay County. He was unopposed in both the primary and general elections, and thus was re-elected again unopposed. Patronis could not run for the Florida House again after 2012 due to term limits.

=== Florida Public Service Commission ===
In 2015, Patronis was appointed to the Florida Public Service Commission by Governor Rick Scott for a four-year term. He resigned from the commission on June 25, 2017, upon his announcement as Chief Financial Officer of Florida.

== Chief Financial Officer of Florida ==
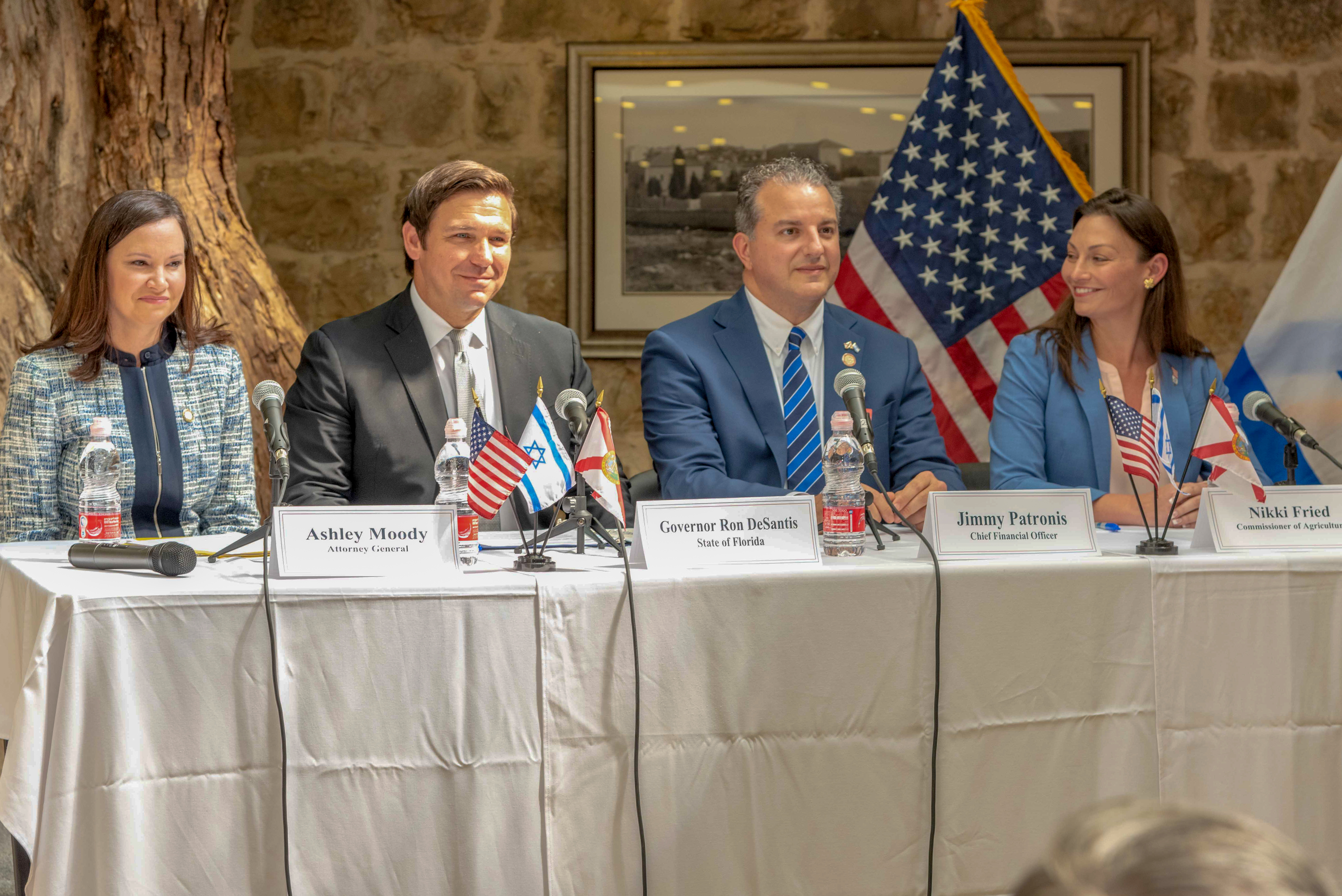
Florida Cabinet meeting, May 2019

On February 10, 2017, Florida's chief financial officer, Jeff Atwater, announced that he would resign in order to take the position of CFO for Florida Atlantic University. Governor Scott officially announced the appointment of Patronis on June 25, 2017. Patronis was officially sworn in to complete Atwater's term on June 30, 2017.

Patronis ran for his first full term in the 2018 CFO election. Patronis was unopposed in the Republican primary. The Democratic nominee was former state senator Jeremy Ring of Broward County. Though Patronis and Ring did not debate on stage, the race was noted for its acrimony, with much attention being drawn to Ring's resume at Yahoo! and Patronis' close ties with Governor Scott. Despite Ring going into election day with a 5-point lead in polling, Patronis defeated Ring, receiving 52% of the vote to Ring's 48%.

During the 2019 legislative session, Patronis worked to pass the firefighter cancer relief bill to provide protection and financial coverage to firefighters who are diagnosed with certain types of cancers.

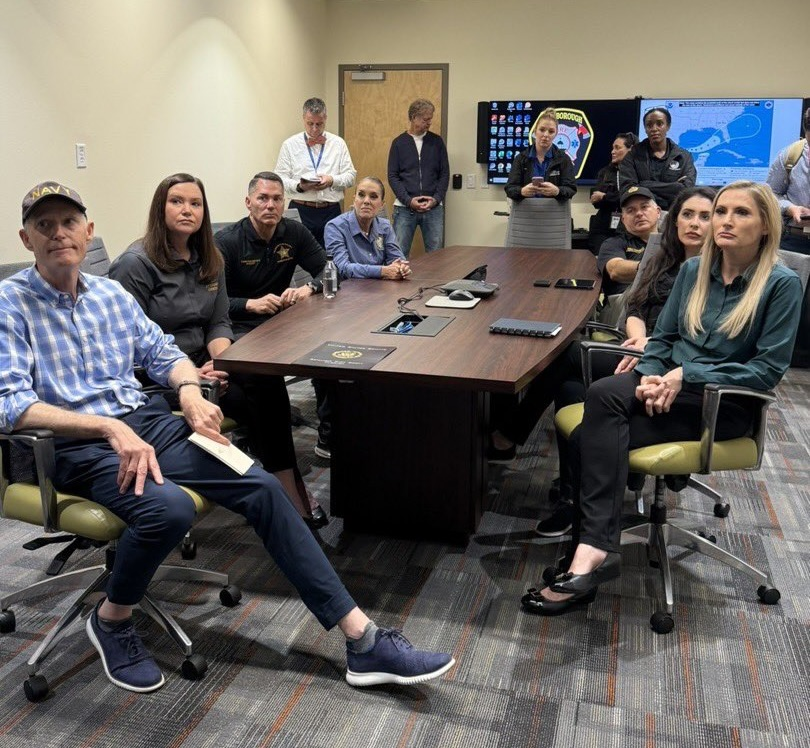
Patronis with Senator Rick Scott, then-Attorney General Ashley Moody, Hillsborough County sheriff Chad Chronister, Congresswoman Anna Paulina Luna, and Congresswoman Laurel Lee in the Hillsborough County, Florida, Emergency Operations Center, responding to Hurricane Milton

In response to former president Donald Trump's indictments, Patronis promoted a plan to provide up to $5 million in taxpayer funds to Trump to pay his legal bills. A bill was filed to enact this proposal by state senator Ileana Garcia, but was withdrawn after a veto threat by Governor Ron DeSantis.

=== Resignation ===
Due to Florida's resign-to-run law, after announcing his candidacy for Congress, Patronis submitted his resignation as chief financial officer of Florida effective March 31, 2025. On July 16, 2025, Governor Ron DeSantis appointed state senator Blaise Ingoglia as his successor, serving until the 2026 election.

== Pay to play accusations ==
Patronis has been involved in several "pay to play" contribution controversies in his political career. Between 2017-2018, Patronis’ Political Action Committee, Treasure Florida, accepted tens of thousands in political contributions from two Florida-based insurance companies, Simple Health and Health Benefits One, that were legally accused of fraud earlier that year. Despite warnings from the Nebraska’s attorney general’s office issued in July 2017 on suspected fraudulent business practices, Patronis accepted $35,000 donation from Simple Health on December 20, 2017, and a second contribution of $15,000 on May 31, 2018. Patronis also accepted a $10,000 donation from Health Benefits One in July 2018. In November 2018, Patronis spokeswoman Katie Stickland said the campaign didn’t know about the alleged fraud and would donate the money to charity, however, Patronis’s own state Division of Financial Services has been investigating both insurance operation for years for allegedly fleecing consumers. Later, in 2024, the Federal Trade Commission obtained a $195 million judgment against Simple Health for selling sham health insurance.

In 2018, Florida commissioner of financial regulation Drew Breakspear was forced out of office by Patronis after Patronis accepted a $25,000 campaign contribution from a Miami financial advisor who was upset that Breakspear refused to remove customer complaints from his file. Patronis denied the $25,000 contribution was a motive for the firing.

In 2019, Florida’s top financial regulator, Ronald Rubin, filed a lawsuit accusing CFO Jimmy Patronis and lobbyist R. Paul Mitchell of orchestrating a “pay-to-play” scheme to solicit $1 million in campaign contributions from Rubin’s father, a wealthy New York investor. Rubin alleged that Mitchell repeatedly called him, implying that Patronis expected the donation in exchange for keeping Rubin in his position. After Rubin refused, he claimed the two conspired to force him out using a sexual harassment allegation as a pretext—one Rubin said was never properly investigated. He was placed on administrative leave and later terminated, prompting Rubin to request a criminal investigation into Patronis’s conduct.

In December 2019, Florida paid $150,000 to settle a harassment complaint filed by a former Office of Financial Regulation (OFR) employee against then-Commissioner Ronald Rubin. The settlement, referring to the employee as "Jane Doe," denied any wrongdoing by OFR. Shortly after, Rubin amended a lawsuit alleging that state CFO Jimmy Patronis misrepresented employee complaints to facilitate Rubin's termination. Rubin contends that Patronis labeled at least one complaint as "sexual harassment" and withheld key details from Governor Ron DeSantis and the Florida Cabinet, leading to Rubin's dismissal in July 2019. Patronis's office disputes these claims, labeling them as misleading and false.

== U.S. House of Representatives ==
=== 2025 U.S. House campaign ===
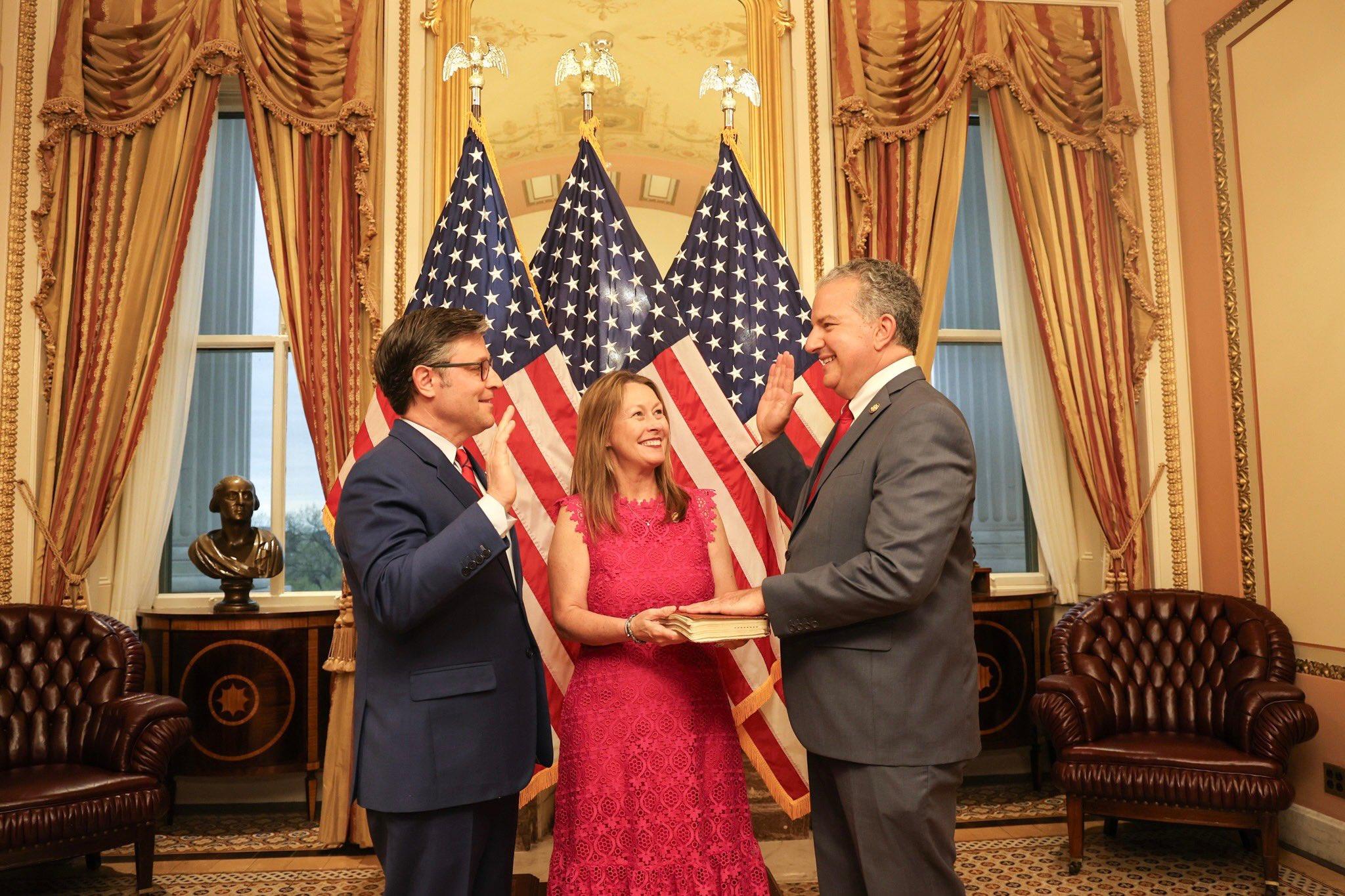
Patronis being sworn in by Speaker Mike Johnson

Upon the re-election of Donald Trump as President of the United States, Congressman Matt Gaetz was nominated to become United States attorney general. Gaetz resigned from the U.S. House of Representatives shortly after the announcement, triggering a special election in Florida's 1st congressional district. On November 25, 2024, Patronis declared his candidacy for the United States Congress and was endorsed by then-President-elect Donald Trump.

Patronis defeated Democratic nominee Gay Valimont in the special election. During the campaign, Valimont outraised Patronis 3-to-1 in contributions.

=== Tenure ===
On April 2, 2025, Patronis was sworn into the U.S. House of Representatives by Speaker Mike Johnson.

Patronis claims residency in the 1st Congressional District of Florida. However, his wife and children are registered to vote in the 2nd Congressional District occupied by Incumbent Neal Dunn.

== Personal life ==
Patronis's family has run Captain Anderson's, a landmark seafood restaurant in Panama City, since purchasing it in 1967. He is currently a partner in the business.

Patronis met his wife Katie in 1998 when her uncle, a family friend, introduced them at Captain Anderson's. They were married in 2006 and have two children. She currently works as a real estate agent in Panama City.

Patronis is an Eastern Orthodox Christian. He is a lifelong member of St. John's Greek Orthodox Church in Panama City, Florida.

== Electoral history ==
Florida's 1st congressional district special election, 2025
| Party | Candidate | Votes | % |
|---|---|---|---|
| Republican | Jimmy Patronis | 97,370 | 56.9 |
| Democratic | Gay Valimont | 72,375 | 42.3 |
| No Party Affiliation | Stephen E. Broden | 1,384 | 0.8 |
| Write-in votes | Stanley Gray | 88 | 0.1 |
| Write-in votes | Stan McDaniels | 31 | 0.0 |
| Write-in votes | Richard Dembinsky | 0 | 0.0 |
| Total votes | | 171,248 | 100.0 |

Florida's 1st congressional district special Republican primary, 2025
| Party | Candidate | Votes | % |
|---|---|---|---|
| Republican | Jimmy Patronis | 33,742 | 65.7 |
| Republican | Joel Rudman | 5,099 | 9.9 |
| Republican | Aaron Dimmock | 3,423 | 6.7 |
| Republican | Gene Valentino | 3,093 | 6.0 |
| Republican | Michael Dylan Thompson | 2,548 | 5.0 |
| Republican | Greg Merk | 1,287 | 2.5 |
| Republican | Jeff Peacock | 743 | 1.4 |
| Republican | Kevin Gaffney | 634 | 1.2 |
| Republican | John Mills | 574 | 1.1 |
| Republican | Jeff Macey | 187 | 0.4 |
| Total votes | | 51,330 | 100.0 |

Florida Chief Financial Officer election, 2022
| Party | Candidate | Votes | % |
|---|---|---|---|
| Republican | Jimmy Patronis (incumbent) | 4,528,811 | 59.5 |
| Democratic | Adam Hattersley | 3,085,697 | 40.5 |
| Total votes | | 7,614,508 | 100.0 |

Florida House of Representatives District 6 general election, 2012
| Party | Candidate | Votes | % |
|---|---|---|---|
| Republican | Jimmy Patronis (incumbent) | unopposed | 100.0 |
| Total votes | | | 100.0 |

Florida House of Representatives District 6 general election, 2010
| Party | Candidate | Votes | % |
|---|---|---|---|
| Republican | Jimmy Patronis (incumbent) | 36,979 | 78.13 |
| Democratic | John McDonald | 10,350 | 21.87 |
| Total votes | | 47,329 | 100.0 |

Florida House of Representatives District 6 general election, 2008
| Party | Candidate | Votes | % |
|---|---|---|---|
| Republican | Jimmy Patronis (incumbent) | unopposed | 100.0 |
| Total votes | | | 100.0 |

Florida House of Representatives District 6 general election, 2006
| Party | Candidate | Votes | % |
|---|---|---|---|
| Republican | Jimmy Patronis | 28,688 | 67.1 |
| Democratic | Janice L. Lucas | 14,049 | 32.9 |
| Write-in votes | George Mac Brogdon | 1 | 0.0 |
| Total votes | | 42,738 | 100.0 |

Florida House of Representatives District 6 Republican primary, 2006
| Party | Candidate | Votes | % |
|---|---|---|---|
| Republican | Jimmy Patronis | 6,089 | 39.2 |
| Republican | Lee Sullivan | 5,150 | 33.2 |
| Republican | Cameron Skinner | 3,939 | 25.4 |
| Republican | William Earl Fisher Jr. | 341 | 2.2 |
| Total votes | | 15,519 | 100.0 |

== See also ==
- List of new members of the 119th United States Congress

Political offices
| Preceded by Jeff Atwater | Chief Financial Officer of Florida; 2017–2025 | Succeeded by Susan Miller; Acting |
Party political offices
| Preceded by Jeff Atwater | Republican nominee for Chief Financial Officer of Florida; 2018, 2022 | Succeeded by Blaise Ingoglia |
U.S. House of Representatives
| Preceded by Matt Gaetz | Member of the U.S. House of Representatives from Florida's 1st congressional district 2025–present | Incumbent |
U.S. order of precedence (ceremonial)
| Preceded by Randy Fine | United States representatives by seniority 424th | Succeeded by James Walkinshaw |
