= Jeremy Ring =

American politician (born 1970)

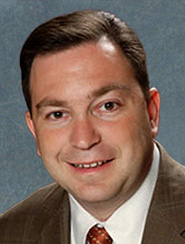

Member of the Florida Senate
- In office November 7, 2006 – November 8, 2016
- Preceded by: Skip Campbell
- Succeeded by: Redistricted
- Constituency: 31st district (2006–2012); 29th district (2012–2016)

Personal details
- Born: August 10, 1970 (age 56) New Haven, Connecticut, U.S.
- Party: Democratic
- Spouse(s): Sharon Ring (Divorced 2016)
- Children: 4
- Education: Syracuse University (BAppSc)

Jeremy Ring (born August 10, 1970) is an American Democratic politician and former tech startup executive from Florida. He served in the Florida Senate from 2006 to 2016, representing parts of Broward County. He was the Democratic nominee for Chief Financial Officer of Florida in the 2018 election.

== Early life and career ==
Ring was born in New Haven, Connecticut, in 1970. He grew up in Canton, Massachusetts and attended Canton Public Schools. He attended Syracuse University, graduating in 1992 with a Bachelors of Applied Science in advertising. Ring was one of the early employees of Yahoo, opening the company's first East Coast office and working to build the company up.

In 2001, Ring moved to Florida, working as an executive in other tech and innovation startups.

In 2018, Jeremy Ring wrote a book called "We Were Yahoo" which discusses his time working at Yahoo.

== Florida Senate ==
In 2006, when incumbent Democratic state senator Skip Campbell was unable to seek re-election due to term limits, Ring ran to succeed him in the 32nd District, which included Coral Springs, Pompano Beach, and Sunrise in northeastern Broward County. He faced Broward County Mayor Benjamin Graber and James W. Haddad in the Democratic primary, and invested nearly a million dollars of his own money to develop an effective field program. Ring defeated Graber and Haddad with 55% of the vote to Graber's 38% and Haddad's 7%. He faced only write-in opposition in the general election and won.

In 2010, Ring was opposed in the general election by Patrick Laffey, a condo association manager and the Republican nominee. The Sun-Sentinel endorsed Ring for re-election, praising his "willingness to work with rival Republicans to advance public policy" and his "firmer grasp of business development and the importance of properly funded and targeted university investments." Ring ended up defeating Laffey in a landslide and received 63% of the vote.

Following the reconfiguration of the state's legislative districts in 2012, Ring was moved into the 29th District, which retained most of the territory that he had previously represented, while expanding westward into Weston. He won the Democratic primary uncontested, and faced college student Soren Swensen, the Republican nominee, in the general election. Ring campaigned on his bipartisan credentials and his willingness to work with Republicans, saying, "I try not to take a political vote. I try not to take a vote based on the next election. It may not align with a political party. I'm not the most ideological person in the Florida Legislature." The Sun-Sentinel endorsed him for re-election, arguing, "He's one of the few state lawmakers that can talk authoritatively about venture capital strategies one minute and devise a bill to tweak a problematic law to help city pension plans stay solvent the next." Ring easily defeated Swensen with 64% of the vote to win his final term in the State Senate.

While serving in the Senate, Ring voted against an election reform bill sponsored by Republicans that aimed to expand early voting times following long lines in 2012, noting that despite it having "some decent provisions," it did not go far enough in ensuring that enough early voting days were provided.

While serving in the legislature, Ring requested approval to work for Sterling Partners, a private equity firm that aimed to win state contracts, as a consultant. He emphasized that there was "nothing unethical or illegal about it" and that he would "not...be a lobbyist on their behalf." Ultimately, he received permission from the Florida Commission on Ethics to do so.

In 2014, Ring applied for the presidency of Florida Atlantic University, but ultimately was not selected as a finalist for the position. Though he had previously indicated that he would not be a candidate for any position before his term was up, he considered running for Chief Financial Officer of Florida in 2014 when the incumbent CFO, Jeff Atwater, who had also applied for the FAU presidency, was selected as a finalist. Ultimately, Atwater was not selected and Ring did not run for his position.

Subsequent media reports said Ring, with a "net worth of $13.7 million and an income of $1.2 million in 2014," was considering running for the Democratic nomination to succeed Florida governor Rick Scott in 2018.

Ring announced on May 31, 2017 that he was entering the 2018 race for Florida CFO. He won the Democratic nomination on August 28, 2018.

On November 6, 2018, Ring lost the general election to Republican incumbent Jimmy Patronis, 51% to 48%.

Party political offices
Preceded by Will Rankin	Democratic nominee for Chief Financial Officer of Florida; 2018	Succeeded by Adam Hattersley
Florida Senate
Preceded by Skip Campbell	Member of the Florida Senate from the 31st district November 21, 2006–November 20, 2012	Succeeded by Joe Negron
Preceded by Chris Smith	Member of the Florida Senate from the 29th district November 20, 2012–November 20, 2016	Succeeded by Kevin Rader
