= Judith Smith =

Judith or Judy Smith may refer to:

- Judith Smith Ladson (1766–1820), American socialite and heiress
- Judith Winsor Smith (1821–1921), American women's suffrage activist and abolitionist
- Judith Kaye (1938–2016), née Smith, American jurist and chief judge of the New York Court of Appeals
- Judy Smith (born 1958), American crisis manager
- Judith Anne Smith, American jurist and associate judge on the Superior Court of the District of Columbia
- Judith Eldredge Smith (1946–1997), American homicide victim
- Judy Seriale Smith, state legislator in Arkansas
