= Kevin Pamphile =

Haitian-born American football player (born 1990)

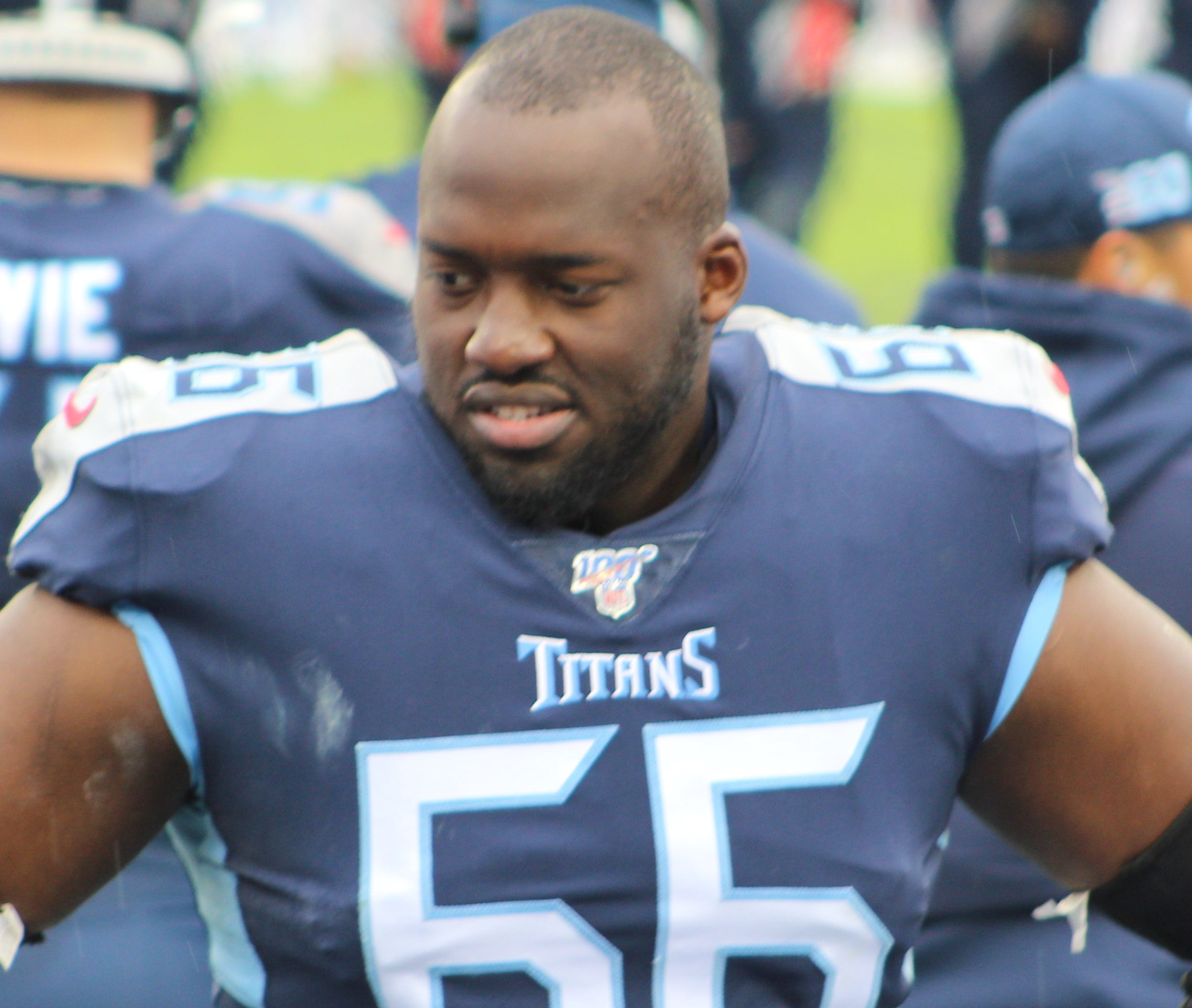
- Pamphile with the Tennessee Titans in 2019

No. 64, 66
- Position: Offensive tackle

Personal information
- Born: November 27, 1990 (age 35); Miami, Florida, U.S.
- Listed height: 6 ft 5 in (1.96 m)
- Listed weight: 315 lb (143 kg)

Career information
- High school: Miami Central (West Little River, Florida)
- College: Purdue
- NFL draft: 2014: 5th round, 149th overall pick

Career history
- Tampa Bay Buccaneers (2014–2017); Tennessee Titans (2018–2019); Washington Football Team (2020)*
- * Offseason or practice squad member only

Career NFL statistics
- Games played: 56
- Games started: 35
- Stats at Pro Football Reference

Kevin Serge Pamphile (born November 27, 1990) is an American former professional football player who was an offensive tackle in the National Football League (NFL). He played college football for the Purdue Boilermakers and was selected by the Tampa Bay Buccaneers in the fifth round of the 2014 NFL draft. He also played for the Tennessee Titans.

== Early life ==
Pamphile was born in Miami, Florida. His parents had moved from Haiti to the United States.

Pamphile attended William H. Turner Technical Arts High School and played basketball there. He did not play football until his senior year, but he received football recruiting offers from Purdue University, Middle Tennessee State University and Florida Atlantic University. As a senior football player, he earned All-Dade County honors and played in the Nike South Florida All-Star Game.

== College career ==
He committed to play college football at Purdue. He spent the 2009 season at Purdue as a redshirt, then played a season as a defensive lineman. He moved to the offensive line before his sophomore year. He became Purdue's starting left tackle in 2013.

== Professional career ==
Prior to the 2014 NFL draft, Pamphile was projected to be a 6th round draft pick by NFLDraftScout.com. He was rated as the 17th-best offensive tackle in the draft. Sportswriter Aaron Wilson wrote that ten teams had expressed interest in Pamphile, including the Oakland Raiders, New York Giants, Green Bay Packers, Houston Texans and Jacksonville Jaguars.

Pre-draft measurables
Height	Weight	Arm length	Hand span	40-yard dash	10-yard split	20-yard split	20-yard shuttle	Three-cone drill	Vertical jump	Broad jump	Bench press
6 ft 4 5/8 in (1.95 m)	310 lb (141 kg)	34 1/4 in (0.87 m)	9 1/8 in (0.23 m)	4.94 s	1.77 s	2.83 s	4.81 s	7.61 s	32 in (0.81 m)	9 ft 0 in (2.74 m)	25 reps
All values from 2014 Purdue Pro Day

Pamphile was selected by the Tampa Bay Buccaneers in the fifth round with the 149th overall pick of the 2014 NFL draft. The team signed him to a four-year contract. He made his NFL debut on November 2, 2014.

On March 22, 2018, Pamphile signed a one-year contract with the Tennessee Titans. He played in the first three games of the 2018 season, starting two at tackle before being placed on injured reserve on September 25, 2018. On March 13, 2019, Pamphile signed a one-year contract extension with the Titans.

He signed with the Washington Football Team on July 28, 2020. He was released on August 20, 2020.
