= Rudy Moise =

United States businessman, physician, and Air Force colonel (born 1954)

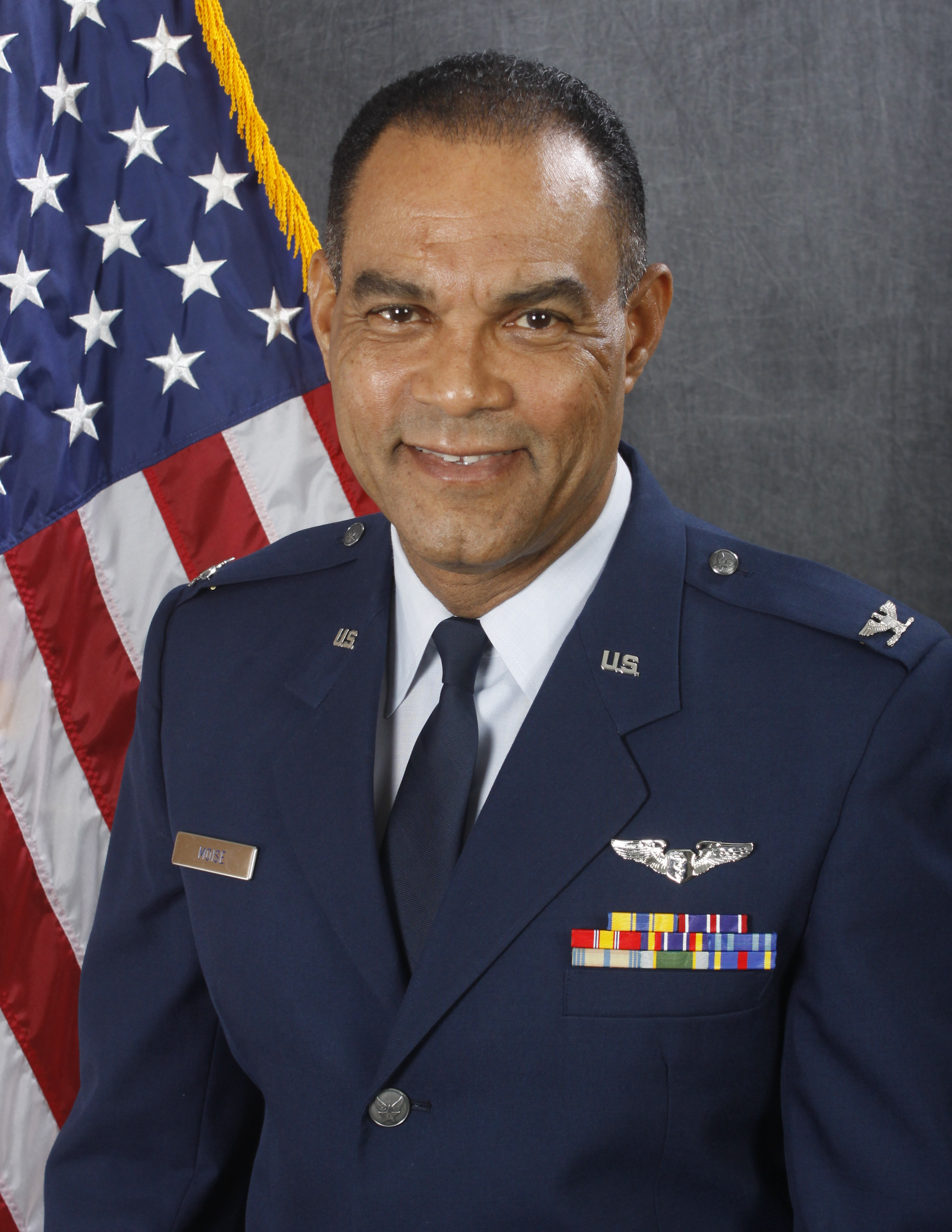
- Official portrait, 2013
- Born: Rudolph Moise; September 22, 1954 (age 72); Port-au-Prince, Haiti
- Education: University of Illinois, Chicago (BA); Midwestern University (DO); University of Miami (MBA, JD)
- Political party: Democratic
- Spouse: Mirjam Moise
- Children: 2
- Military career
- Branch: United States Air Force
- Service years: 1997–2013
- Rank: Colonel
- Unit: Flight surgeon

Rudolph Moise (born September 22, 1954) is the owner and medical director of Comprehensive Medical Aesthetics in Miami. Prior to becoming a physician, he served as a flight surgeon in the United States Air Force for more than 21 years, earning the rank of colonel, the highest position awarded to an American of Haitian descent at that time. Moise is running in 2026 to represent Florida's 24th congressional district, after withdrawing from a run in the 20th.

== Early life and education ==
Moise was born into a middle-class family in Port-au-Prince, Haiti. He attended Catholic secondary school in Haiti and then received a bachelor's degree from the University of Illinois at Chicago and a Doctor of Osteopathic Medicine from the Chicago College of Osteopathic Medicine.

Moise relocated to Miami sometime during the 1980s, and had earned a federal grant for his medical studies where he devoted several years of practice to a community that saw a large influx of Haitian refugees, that had been underserved and lacked enough doctors who spoke Creole.

== Career ==
=== Medicine ===
To fulfill his requirements for a federal grant for medical studies, Moise worked for four years in a Miami clinic in a community with a large number of Haitian refugees, that had been underserved, and lacked enough doctors who spoke Creole. After four years, he started his own practice in an 800 square-foot storefront in North Miami, which grew into a Comprehensive Health Center with several locations amassing to 10,000 square-footage.

Soon after opening his own practice, Moise enrolled at the University of Miami where he earned an MBA, and then a JD.

In the 1980s, Moise worked as the on-call surgeon for Miami Vice.

=== Military ===
Upon completion of his JD at UM, Moise volunteered to enter the Air Force Reserve, where he served for twenty-one years and rose as flight surgeon to the rank of colonel, the highest ranking American of Haitian descent to hold such a position.

=== Business ventures ===
Moise has used his profits to invest in more than twenty businesses that include an ambulance company and a movie production firm.

In 2001, Moise established Miami's first full-time Creole-language radio station, Radio Carnivale, leasing airtime from 1020 AM. The station went defunct in 2004.

Moise was President of the University of Miami Alumni Association (2003–2005), and has served on a number of boards.

=== Politics ===
After testifying and offering recommendations about Haiti's crisis before the U.S. Senate Foreign Relations Committee in 2003, Moise was appointed in 2004 by Florida governor Jeb Bush to serve on an advisory group to help Haiti.

In the 2010 open primary election for Florida's 17th congressional district, he was one of several Haitian-American candidates who lost the nomination to Frederica Wilson, who went on to win her first term to Congress that fall. Running for the state's 24th congressional district in 2012, Moise lost again in a head-to-head primary against Wilson, who had been endorsed by President Obama. Moise put $1 million of his own funds into his campaign.

In January 2026, Moise filed to run in the 2026 election to choose the next representative for Florida's 20th congressional district, challenging incumbent Sheila Cherfilus-McCormick and several other candidates in the Democratic primary; he switched his run to the 24th congressional district in May as Wilson was deciding not to run for reelection there. Moise was eliminated in the district's Democratic primary, fourth among seven on the ballot.

== Philanthropy ==
Moise contributed $120,000 to complete a 2009 monument in Savannah, Georgia, of a Haitian regiment known as the Chasseurs-Volontaires de Saint-Domingue that served as a reserve unit to the American and French forces against the British at the Siege of Savannah.

In January 2010, Moise traveled to Haiti with a Disaster Rescue Team two days after the country was struck with a major earthquake, saving 11 lives.

== Honors ==
In October 1991, Moise was honored among "Dade County's Top 10 Black Businesses" by the Miami Dade Chamber of Commerce. In 1994, he won the Up and Comers Award by Price Waterhouse, and "Man of the Year" by the New Miami Group Inc. in May. In 1997, he was awarded "Black Business of the Year" by the Greater Miami Chamber of Commerce, and was the winner of the "Entrepreneurial Excellence Award" by the Jim Moran Institute for Global Entrepreneurship in 1998. Moise was awarded the "Bill Colson Award" in 1994–1995 and the "Black Business of the Year Award" by the Greater Miami Chamber of Commerce and the "Community Leadership Award" in 2004. In 2005, he was among the five finalists for "Best Physician of the Year Award" in South Florida by The Business Journal.

In October 2016, Moise won the Pinnacle Award from the International Career and Business Alliance for achievement and excellence. He is the past recipient of the Silver Medallion MCCJ Humanitarian of the Year Award, the American Diabetes Association Father of the Year Award and the 2012 Dorothy Shula Outstanding Volunteerism Award from the United Way of Miami Dade County. In 2017, he was honored with a Humanitarian Award by Catwalk for Charity.

In June 1988, Moise was among 28 bachelors featured by Ebony magazine.

In July 2023, Moise received the President's Lifetime Achievement Award for cumulative volunteer service.

== Criticism ==
Moise was criticized in 2009 for his likeness being used for the historical Haitian monument at Franklin Square in Savannah, Georgia. Other Haitian community leaders have voiced their displeasure, such as Phillip Brutus calling it "sacrilege" and "corrupting history". Brutus went on to say, "Haitians hold this very dear to their hearts. They take it very seriously, and when someone tampers with this, it unleashes all sorts of anger and anguish." The opposition vowed to get the statues replaced with more accurate facial depictions.

Moise said he was approached by organizers about completing Savannah's Haitian memorial after a campaign to collect small donations for it had stalled. Moise agreed to the request for funds and mentioned that sculptor James Mastin had asked him to sit for the piece because of his past experience as a magazine model.

== Personal life ==
Moise is married to his wife Mirjam, who is of German–Caymanian descent. He is Catholic.

== Electoral history ==
2010 17th Congressional District of Florida Democratic Primary
Party	Candidate	Votes	%	±%
Democratic	Frederica Wilson	16,653	35%	
Democratic	Rudy Moise	7,769	16%	
Democratic	Shirley Gibson	5,777	12%	
Democratic	Yolly Roberson	4,921	10%	
Democratic	Phillip Brutus	4,068	8%	
Democratic	Marleine Bastien	2,889	6%	
Democratic	Scott Galvin	2,653	6%	
Democratic	James Bush	2,630	5%	
Democratic	Andre Williams	842	2%	

2012 24th Congressional District of Florida Democratic Primary
Party	Candidate	Votes	%	±%
Democratic	Frederica Wilson	42,764	65.4	
Democratic	Rudy Moise	22,650	34.6	

== Filmography ==
Year	Title	Role	Notes
2003	Wind of Desire	Richard Lazard	executive producer
2004	Prince of Haiti: King of Paris	as himself	special appearance
2006	Cousines	Charles	
2009	Life Outside of Pearl	Father Jack	
2010	Trapped: Haitian Nights	Richard Lazard	executive producer
2010	Pastor Jones: The Complete First Season	Father Renaud	video; executive producer
2013	Dolls of Voodoo	Richard Lazard	executive producer
2015	If I Tell You I Have to Kill You		executive producer
