= Big Brother Jake =

American comedy television series

- Genre: Sitcom
- Created by: Chris Auer
- Directed by: Gary Shimokawa
- Starring: Jake Steinfeld; Barbara Meek; Ben Siegler; Josiah Trager; Gabrielle Carmouche; Jeremy Wieand; Daniel Hifler; Elizabeth Narvaez; Melody Combs; Rachelle Guzy; Denise Devin; Jane Connell
- Country of origin: United States
- Original language: English
- No. of seasons: 4
- No. of episodes: 88

Production
- Executive producer: Chris Auer
- Producer: Christopher Frederick
- Running time: 30 minutes
- Production companies: NorthStar Entertainment Group; Family Productions

Original release
- Network: The Family Channel
- Release: September 2, 1990 – April 10, 1994

Big Brother Jake is an American sitcom starring Jake Steinfeld that aired on The Family Channel from September 2, 1990, to April 10, 1994. It is notable for being the first sitcom on The Family Channel.

== Plot ==
The show follows the life of Jake Rozzner (Steinfeld), a former Hollywood stuntman who returned to his Brooklyn foster home to help out his recently widowed foster mother, Connie "Ma" Duncan with her foster children. The foster family included Lou, Kateri, Jill, Andy, and Dave. Jill left the show after two seasons and a young, abandoned Asian girl, Caroline was in the care of Ma Duncan.

Gary was Jake's good friend from high school who was now a Manhattan lawyer and Jane was Jake's former high school girlfriend. Miss Morgan was the social worker before being replaced with Miss Domedian. The older youngsters attended Frederick Douglass High School. Jake was the narrator of the show.

== Cast ==
- Jake Steinfeld as Jake Rozzner
- Barbara Meek as Connie "Ma" Duncan
- Ben Siegler as Gary MacClemore
- Josiah Trager as Loomis "Lou" Washington
- Gabrielle Carmouche as Kateri Monroe
- Jeremy Wieand as Andy King
- Daniel Hilfer as Dave King
- Elizabeth Narvaez as Jill Kenyon (1990–1992)
- Melody Combs as Jane O'Hara (1991–1993)
- Rachelle Guzy as Caroline (1992-1994)
- Denise Devin as Miss Meg Morgan (1990-1991)
- Jane Connell as Miss Roberta Domedian (1991-1994)

== Episodes ==
=== Season 1 (1990–91) ===
No. overall	No. in season	Title	Directed by	Written by	Original release date
1	1	"Twin Pecs"	Gary Shimokawa	Ed Ferrara & Kevin Murphy	September 2, 1990
2	2	"Who's Afraid of Thomas Wolfe?"	Unknown	Chris Auer	September 14, 1990
3	3	"The 10% Solution"	Unknown	Chris Auer	September 21, 1990
4	4	"Jake and the No. 2 Pencil"	Unknown	Chris Auer	September 28, 1990
5	5	"Dinner for Eight"	Unknown	Chris Auer	October 5, 1990
6	6	"The World of Mrs. Fong"	Unknown	Chris Auer	October 12, 1990
7	7	"Dress Blues"	Unknown	Margaret Beddow Hatch	October 19, 1990
8	8	"Satellites"	Gary Shimokawa	Jon Cooksey & Ali Marie Matheson	October 26, 1990
9	9	"The Prodigal Dad"	Gary Shimokawa	Jon Cooksey & Ali Marie Matheson	November 2, 1990
10	10	"What's Opera Jake?"	Unknown	Chris Auer	November 9, 1990
11	11	"What's Wrong with This Picture?"	Gary Shimokawa	Maria A. Brown	November 16, 1990
12	12	"The Rise and Fall of Vito Parchesi"	Unknown	Ed Ferrara & Kevin Murphy	November 23, 1990
13	13	"They Call Me Mellow Cello"	Unknown	John Griffiths & Tom Sheppard	December 2, 1990
14	14	"A Dreidel Spins in Brooklyn"	Unknown	Chris Auer & Jeffrey Sweet	December 9, 1990
15	15	"Jake's Date"	Gary Shimokawa	Larry Balmagia	December 16, 1990
16	16	"The Grocer Always Rings Twice"	Gary Shimokawa	Jim Lincoln	December 23, 1990
17	17	"Stop Me Before I Paint Again"	Unknown	Maria A. Brown	December 30, 1990
18	18	"Todd's Feast"	Gary Shimokawa	Chris Auer	January 6, 1991
19	19	"Didn't You Used to Be Somebody Else?"	Unknown	Margaret Beddow Hatch	January 13, 1991
20	20	"Marriage 101"	Unknown	Steve Sylvester	January 20, 1991
21	21	"The Once and Future Kings"	Unknown	Jon Cooksey & Ed Ferrara & Ali Marie Matheson & Kevin Murphy	January 27, 1991
22	22	"They Shoot Social Workers, Don't They?"	Unknown	Chris Auer & Stephen Wells	February 3, 1991

=== Season 2 (1991–92) ===
No. overall	No. in season	Title	Directed by	Written by	Original release date
23	1	"Remodeling with the Enemy"	Gary Shimokawa	Chris Auer	September 1, 1991
24	2	"Roberta's Flak"	Gary Shimokawa	Ed Ferrara & Kevin Murphy	September 8, 1991
25	3	"Six Characters in Search of a Catcher's Mill"	Gary Shimokawa	Chris Auer	September 15, 1991
26	4	"They're Not Booin', They're Louin'"	Gary Shimokawa	Jim Lincoln	September 22, 1991
27	5	"Two Guys from Brooklyn"	Gary Shimokawa	Maria A. Brown	September 29, 1991
28	6	"Dressed to Thrill"	Gary Shimokawa	Kris and Buzz McLaughlin	October 6, 1991
29	7	"The Old Man and the C"	Gary Shimokawa	Jon Cooksey & Ali Marie Matheson	October 13, 1991
30	8	"Friends and Big Women"	Gary Shimokawa	Michael Loman	October 20, 1991
31	9	"It Came from Social Services"	Gary Shimokawa	Ed Ferrara & Kevin Murphy	October 27, 1991
32	10	"An Immovable Feast"	Gary Shimokawa	Jon Cooksey & Ali Marie Matheson	November 24, 1991
33	11	"Romeo, Juliet, Jake & Jill"	Gary Shimokawa	Sam Greenbaum	December 1, 1991
34	12	"The Boys from Near Syracuse"	Unknown	Jim Lincoln	December 8, 1991
35	13	"Open Season"	Gary Shimokawa	Chris Auer	December 15, 1991
36	14	"Bohemian Rhapsody"	Unknown	Ed Ferrara & Kevin Murphy	January 5, 1992
37	15	"True Lou"	Unknown	Mary Anne Cherry	January 12, 1992
38	16	"The Son Also Rises"	Unknown	Jon Cooksey & Ali Marie Matheson	January 26, 1992
39	17	"Five Easy Steps"	Gary Shimokawa	Kris and Buzz McLaughlin	March 1, 1992
40	18	"The Song and Dance Man"	Gary Shimokawa	Stephen Wells	March 8, 1992
41	19	"Presumed Guilty"	Gary Shimokawa	Arnie Wess & Dave DiGregorio	March 15, 1992
42	20	"Who's Sorry Now?"	Gary Shimokawa	Chris Auer	March 22, 1992
43	21	"Goodbye Ms. Phipps"	Gary Shimokawa	Steve Wells & Jim Lincoln	March 29, 1992
44	22	"Reunion"	Gary Shimokawa	Lisa Swain	April 12, 1992

=== Season 3 (1992–93) ===
No. overall	No. in season	Title	Directed by	Written by	Original release date
45	1	"Snap Decisions"	Unknown	Jon Cooksey & Ali Marie Matheson	October 4, 1992
46	2	"Surprise, No Party"	Unknown	Arnie Wess & Dave DiGregorio	October 11, 1992
47	3	"Louis Armstrong Slept Here"	Unknown	George Yanok	October 18, 1992
48	4	"Just a Gigolo"	Unknown	Ed Ferrara & Kevin Murphy	October 25, 1992
49	5	"Tis a Pity She's a Grouch"	Unknown	Story by : Cary McNeal; Teleplay by : Ed Ferrara & Kevin Murphy	November 1, 1992
50	6	"Fathers and Sons"	Unknown	Jim Lincoln	November 8, 1992
51	7	"The Unbearable Politeness of Being"	Unknown	Jon Cooksey & Ali Marie Matheson	November 29, 1992
52	8	"Symbolic Gesture"	Unknown	Sherri Ziff	December 6, 1992
53	9	"Jake's Next Date"	Unknown	Terry Erwin	December 13, 1992
54	10	"As Time Goes By"	Unknown	Jon Cooksey & Ali Marie Matheson	January 3, 1993
55	11	"The Importance of Being Ernest"	Unknown	Ed Ferrara & Kevin Murphy	January 10, 1993
56	12	"The Mousetrap"	Unknown	Chris Auer	January 17, 1993
57	13	"Enemies: A Law Story"	Gary Shimokawa	Dave Rodgers & Dan Studney	January 31, 1993
58	14	"It's All in Your Family"	Unknown	George Yanok	February 7, 1993
59	15	"Heroes"	Unknown	Ben Siegler	February 21, 1993
60	16	"The Apes of Wrath"	Unknown	Stephen Wells & Dennis Green	February 28, 1993
61	17	"A League of His Own"	Unknown	Jim Lincoln	March 7, 1993
62	18	"Guess Who's Coming to Dinner"	Unknown	Ed Ferrara & Kevin Murphy	March 14, 1993
63	19	"Front Window"	Unknown	Terry Erwin	March 21, 1993
64	20	"Rebirth of a Salesman"	Unknown	Chris Auer	March 28, 1993
65	21	"Cyrano Domedian"	Unknown	Jim Lincoln	April 11, 1993
66	22	"Burma Shave"	Unknown	Chris Auer	April 18, 1993

=== Season 4 (1993–94) ===
No. overall	No. in season	Title	Directed by	Written by	Original release date
67	1	"The Chocolate Bear War"	Unknown	Story by : Peter T. Kenny & Jim Lincoln; Teleplay by : Jim Lincoln	September 12, 1993
68	2	"Loneliness of the Long Distance Kateri"	Unknown	George Yanok	September 19, 1993
69	3	"Awakenings"	Unknown	Jon Cooksey & Ali Marie Matheson	September 26, 1993
70	4	"Desperately Seeking Daryl"	Unknown	Ed Ferrara & Kevin Murphy	October 3, 1993
71	5	"Coup for Two"	Unknown	Chris Auer	October 10, 1993
72	6	"Tinker, Tailor, Soldier, Bubba"	Unknown	George Yanok	October 17, 1993
73	7	"The Buddy System"	Unknown	Jim Lincoln	October 31, 1993
74	8	"Embrace You"	Unknown	Ed Ferrara & Kevin Murphy	November 7, 1993
75	9	"Never on a Sundae"	Unknown	Tom Mardirosian	November 14, 1993
76	10	"Rain Men"	Unknown	Julie Curtis Ames & Andrew Ames	November 21, 1993
77	11	"Requiem for a Heavyweight"	Unknown	Jon Cooksey & Ali Marie Matheson	December 5, 1993
78	12	"I'll Be Sick for Christmas"	Unknown	Chris Auer	December 12, 1993
79	13	"The Not-Ready-for-Prime-Time Player"	Unknown	Ed Ferrara & Kevin Murphy	January 9, 1994
80	14	"The Turkey and I"	Unknown	Barry Harman & Harve Brosten	January 23, 1994
81	15	"The Lost Detail"	Unknown	Jon Cooksey & Ali Marie Matheson	February 13, 1994
82	16	"And Baby Makes Two"	Unknown	Jon Cooksey & Ali Marie Matheson	February 27, 1994
83	17	"How I Got Into College"	Unknown	Jim Lincoln	March 5, 1994
84	18	"Lomax: A Suitable Case for Treatment"	Unknown	Ed Ferrara & Kevin Murphy	March 13, 1994
85	19	"The Don is Done"	Unknown	George Yanok	March 20, 1994
86	20	"The Charade's the Thing"	Unknown	Timothy Williams	March 27, 1994
87	21	"Betty Blue"	Unknown	Jim Lincoln	April 3, 1994
88	22	"My Own Private Dakota Park"	Unknown	Jim Lincoln	April 10, 1994
