= 30 Something Working Group =

Group in US House of Representatives Democratic caucus

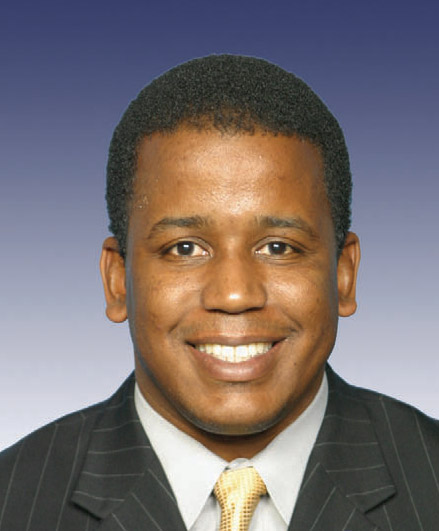
Kendrick Meek (FL-17)

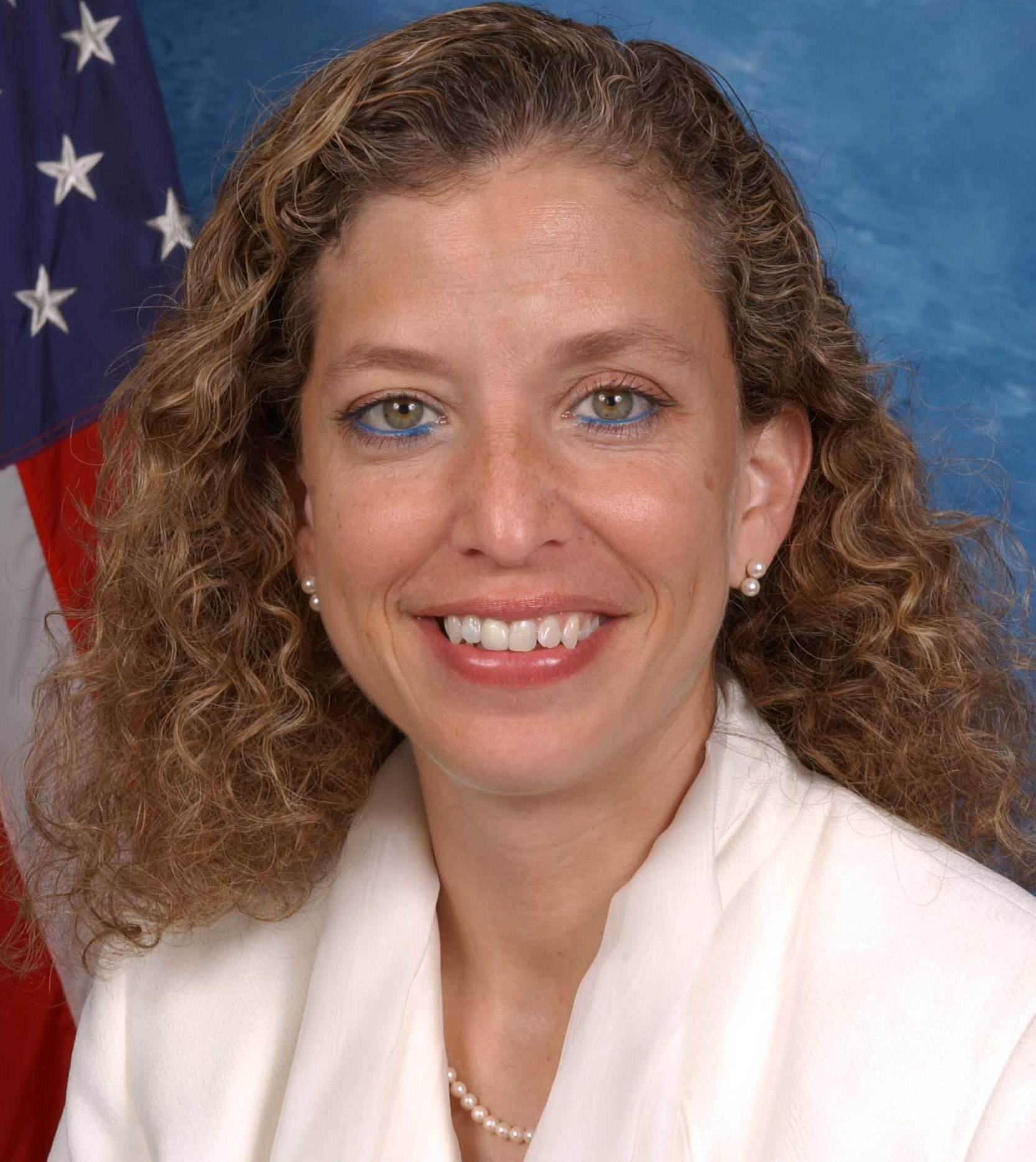
Debbie Wasserman Schultz (FL-20)

The 30 Something Working Group was a grouping of ten members of the United States House of Representatives Democratic caucus, most of whom were under the age of forty. Minority Leader Nancy Pelosi created the group in an effort reach out to younger American voters following a decline in support in recent elections.

Active primarily during the 109th Congress, when the Democrats were the minority party, the group's stated mission was "engaging the next generation of Americans further in government and the political process". For much of its history, the group was led by Debbie Wasserman Schultz and Kendrick Meek, both of whom were from South Florida. While Congress was in session, members of the group often gave speeches to an empty House chamber; its main audience then being viewers on C-SPAN.

== Members ==
- Jason Altmire (PA-4)
- Dan Boren (OK-2)
- Yvette Clarke (NY-11)
- Chris Murphy (CT-5)
- Tim Ryan (OH-17)
- Linda Sánchez (CA-39)
- Heath Shuler (NC-11)
- Debbie Wasserman Schultz (FL-20)
- Kendrick Meek (FL-17)
- Bill Delahunt (MA-10) — Honorary member

== Legacy ==
According to Representative Ryan, members of the Working Group were "rewarded" with positions on powerful committees; Wasserman Schultz was appointed to the Ways and Means committee in the 110th Congress.

The last update on the group's website is dated January 28, 2008, and the group is presumably defunct. During the 113th Congress in 2015, the Future Forum caucus was established, a spiritual successor to the 30 something working group. It similarly features young, Democrat house members, and attempts to reach out and elevate issues pertaining to Millennial and Generation Z voters.
