= Leslie Meek =

American judge (born 1965)

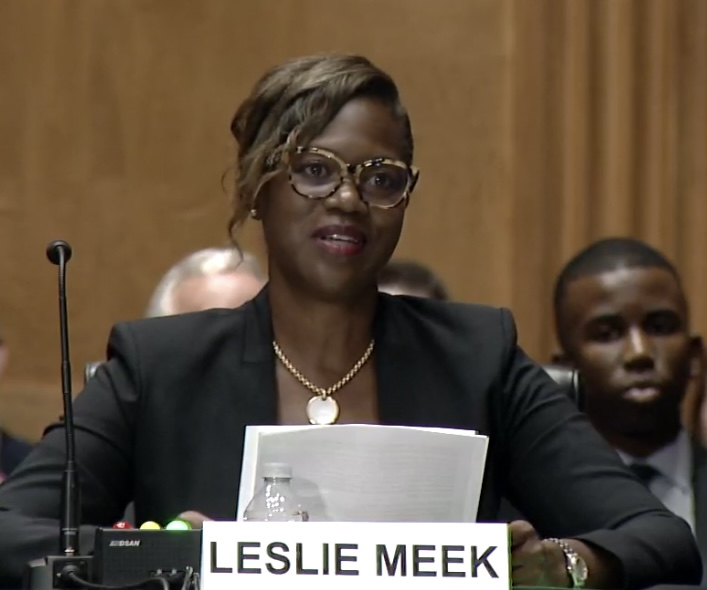

Associate Judge of the Superior Court of the District of Columbia
- Incumbent
- Assumed office January 17, 2023
- Appointed by: Joe Biden
- Preceded by: Judith Anne Smith

Personal details
- Born: May 9, 1965 (age 61) Brooklyn, New York, U.S.
- Spouse: Kendrick Meek (divorced)
- Education: Fisk University (BA); Case Western Reserve University (JD)

Leslie Amenia Meek (born May 9, 1965) is an American lawyer who has served as an associate judge of the Superior Court of the District of Columbia since 2023. She previously served as an administrative law judge from 2006 to 2023.

== Early life and education ==
Meek received her Bachelor of Arts from Fisk University in 1987 and her Juris Doctor from Case Western Reserve University School of Law in 1990.

== Career ==
Meek began her career working in the Miami-Dade State Attorney's Office. Meek served as an assistant city attorney for Miami, and from 1992 to 1994, she worked as an assistant general counsel for the Florida Comptroller. From 1995 to 2003, she served as assistant general counsel and then general counsel for the United Teachers of Dade in Miami. From 2006 to 2014, Meek served as an administrative law judge and appellate administrative law judge with the administrative hearings division of the District of Columbia Department of Employment Services. From 2014 to 2023, she served as an administrative law judge with the District of Columbia Office of Administrative Hearings.

=== D.C. superior court service ===
On December 15, 2021, President Joe Biden nominated Meek to serve as a Judge of the Superior Court of the District of Columbia. President Biden nominated Meek to the seat to be vacated by Judge Judith Anne Smith, whose term subsequently expired on January 21, 2022. On September 21, 2022, a hearing on her nomination was held before the Senate Homeland Security and Governmental Affairs Committee. On September 28, 2022, her nomination was favorably reported out of committee by voice vote en bloc, with Senators Rick Scott and Josh Hawley voting "no" on record. On December 15, 2022, her nomination was confirmed in the Senate by voice vote. She was sworn in on January 17, 2023.

== Personal life ==
Meek was married to U.S. Representative Kendrick Meek, a Democrat from Florida, with whom she has two children. Meek served as the chair of the Congressional Black Caucus Spouses organization.

Legal offices
| Preceded by Judith Anne Smith | Judge of the Superior Court of the District of Columbia; 2023–present | Incumbent |
