= William Lehman (Florida politician) =

American politician

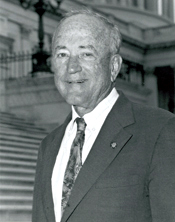

Member of the U.S. House of Representatives from Florida
- In office January 3, 1973 – January 3, 1993
- Preceded by: Constituency established
- Succeeded by: Carrie Meek
- Constituency: 13th district (1973–1983); 17th district (1983–1993)

Chair of the Miami-Dade County Public School Board
- In office January 5, 1971 – June 7, 1972
- Preceded by: G. Holmes Braddock
- Succeeded by: G. Holmes Braddock

Personal details
- Born: October 5, 1913 Selma, Alabama, U.S.
- Died: March 16, 2005 (aged 91) Miami Beach, Florida, U.S.
- Party: Democratic
- Education: University of Alabama; Oxford University
- Occupation: Politician, auto dealer, teacher

William M. Lehman (October 5, 1913 – March 16, 2005) was an American politician. He served in the United States House of Representatives, representing Florida from 1973 until 1993.

== Early life ==
Born in Selma, Alabama, Lehman graduated from Dallas Academy and Selma High School in 1930. He received a B.S. from the University of Alabama at Tuscaloosa in 1934 and attended Oxford University in 1965. He was a brother of Zeta Beta Tau.

He was an auto dealer and a teacher at Miami Norland Junior High School in Miami, Florida, in 1963–1964, while also working as an instructor at Miami-Dade Junior College in 1965–1966.

== Political career ==
He was a member of the Miami-Dade County School Board from 1966 to 1972, and was elected as a Democrat to the Ninety-third and to the nine succeeding Congresses, serving from January 3, 1973, to January 3, 1993. He was not a candidate for renomination to the One Hundred Third Congress in 1992. Segments of the area the seat occupied were folded into a district currently served by Debbie Wasserman Schultz. Serving as chair of the Miami-Dade county transportation subcommittee, he helped create the Metrorail and Tri-Rail systems. Other work includes the assisted creation of the trauma care center at Jackson Memorial Hospital.

== Death ==
He died in 2005 in Miami Beach, aged 91. William Lehman Elementary School in Miami, Florida, and the William Lehman Causeway are named after him.

== See also ==
- List of Jewish members of the United States Congress

U.S. House of Representatives
New district	Member of the U.S. House of Representatives from Florida's 13th congressional district 1973–1983	Succeeded by Connie Mack
New district	Member of the U.S. House of Representatives from Florida's 17th congressional district 1983–1993	Succeeded by Carrie P. Meek
