= United States House of Representatives ban on head covering =

1837 resolution banning headgear in Congress

The United States House of Representatives ban on head covering is an 1837 simple resolution that is a sumptuary rule restricting representatives from wearing any headgear during sessions. It originally represented a break from the British House of Commons hat-wearing tradition, as well as reflecting the 19th century etiquette rule against wearing hats indoors. After 181 years, in 2018 a partial repeal to allow religious accommodation for a number of faiths that practice head covering was proposed with the election of Ilhan Omar, who wears a hijab.

== Passage ==
The rule was passed without significant debate on September 14, 1837, after earlier failed proposals by Charles F. Mercer in 1822, by George McDuffie in 1828, and by James K. Polk in 1833. It is simply worded, “Every member shall remain uncovered during the sessions of the House." This break from the British House of Commons hat-wearing tradition was originally "the fruit of a considerable agitation" and opposition from those who saw hats as a symbol of legislative independence. In the 1833 debate, Lewis Williams and John M. Patton vocally opposed the restriction.

A ban on hoods was added to the rule in 2012.

== Proposed repeal ==
Bella Abzug tried to wear her signature brimmed hat after her election in 1971, but was forced to remove it by the House doorkeeper. The rule was unsuccessfully challenged by Frederica Wilson in 2010, known for her embrace of a variety of hats (including "sequined cowboy hats") as a fashion item, and the issue was raised of a dress code with adverse impact on women in government.

A partial repeal to allow religious accommodation was proposed in 2018 with the election of Ilhan Omar, to allow the Islamic hijab as well as the Jewish kippah and Sikh dastar. The new rule was co-authored by Ilhan Omar with Nancy Pelosi and Jim McGovern, and was supported by religious groups including the Orthodox Jewish bodies Orthodox Union and Agudath Israel. A medical exception was also added for members who are undergoing chemotherapy. On January 9, 2019, the rules were amended to permit religious headwear.
