= Frederica Wilson =

American politician (born 1942)

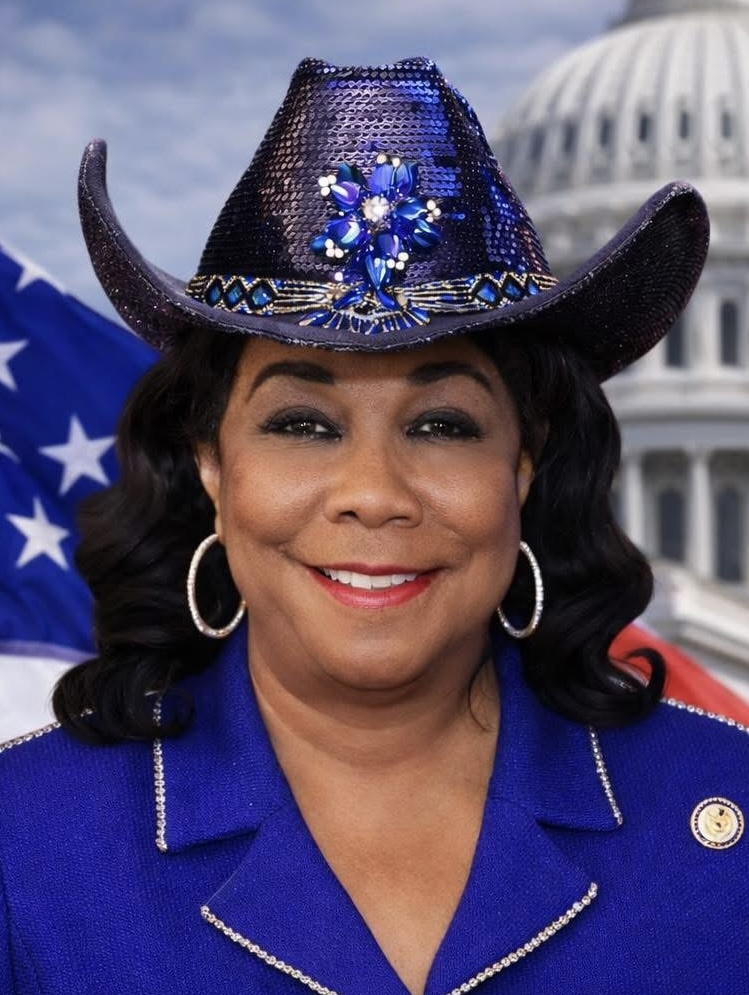
- Wilson in 2026

Member of the U.S. House of Representatives from Florida
- Incumbent
- Assumed office January 3, 2011
- Preceded by: Kendrick Meek
- Constituency: 17th district (2011–2013); 24th district (2013–present)

Member of the Florida Senate from the 33rd district
- In office November 5, 2002 – December 31, 2010
- Preceded by: Redistricted
- Succeeded by: Oscar Braynon

Member of the Florida House of Representatives from the 104th district
- In office November 3, 1998 – November 5, 2002
- Preceded by: Kendrick Meek
- Succeeded by: Redistricted

Personal details
- Born: Frederica Patricia Smith; November 5, 1942 (age 84) Miami, Florida, U.S.
- Party: Democratic
- Spouse: Paul Wilson (m. 1963; died 1988)
- Children: 3
- Education: Fisk University (BS); University of Miami (MS)
- Website: House website Campaign website

Frederica Patricia Wilson (née Smith, November 5, 1942) is an American politician who has been a member of the United States House of Representatives since 2011, representing Florida's 24th congressional district. Located in South Florida, Wilson's congressional district, numbered 17th during her first term, covers a large swath of eastern Miami-Dade County. The district contains most of Miami's majority-black precincts. Wilson gained national attention in 2012 for her comments on the death of Trayvon Martin. In May 2026, Wilson announced her retirement.

Wilson is a member of the Democratic Party. The seat to which she was elected became available when the incumbent, Kendrick Meek, ran for a seat in the Senate in 2010.

Wilson is known for her large and colorful hats, of which she owns several hundred. She has gone through efforts to get Congress to lift its ban on head coverings during House sessions, which dates to 1837.

== Early life, education, and early career ==
Wilson was born Frederica Smith on November 5, 1942, in Miami, Florida, the daughter of Beulah (née Finley) and Thirlee Smith. Her maternal grandparents were Bahamian. Wilson earned her bachelor of arts degree from Fisk University in 1963 and her master of arts degree from the University of Miami in 1972, both in elementary education. She served as the principal of Skyway Elementary School in Miami. In 1992 she left her position as principal to serve on the Miami-Dade County School Board. While a member of the school board, Wilson started 5,000 Role Models of Excellence, an in-school mentoring program.

== Florida Legislature ==
Wilson represented the 104th district in the Florida House of Representatives from 1998 to 2002. She then represented the 33rd district in the Florida Senate from 2002 until her election to Congress in 2010, when term limits prevented her from running again. She served as Minority Leader Pro Tempore in 2006, then Minority Whip.

An early supporter of Barack Obama's 2008 presidential campaign, she voted for Obama and Joe Biden in 2008 as one of Florida's presidential electors.

== U.S. House of Representatives ==
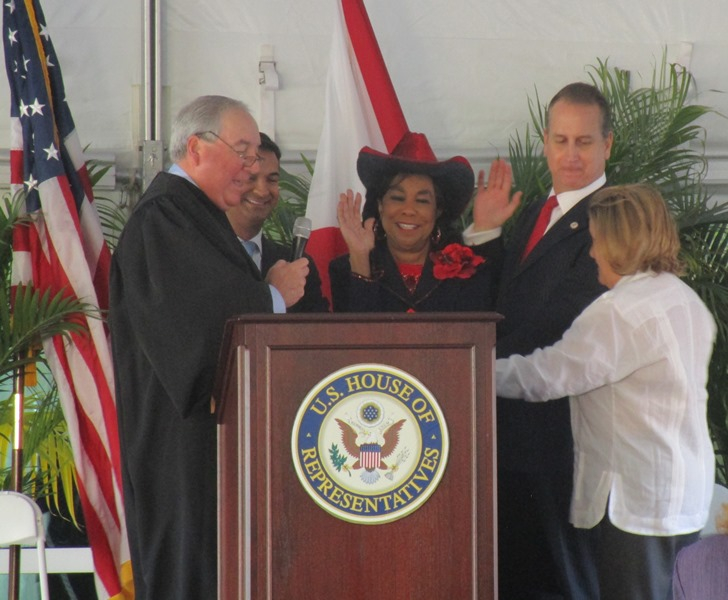
Chief Judge Kevin Michael Moore, swearing in Members of Congress Carlos Curbelo, Frederica Wilson, Mario Díaz-Balart, and Ileana Ros-Lehtinen. (February 2015)

=== Committee assignments ===
For the 119th Congress:

- Committee on Education and the Workforce
  - Subcommittee on Early Childhood, Elementary, and Secondary Education
  - Subcommittee on Higher Education and Workforce Development
- Committee on Transportation and Infrastructure
  - Subcommittee on Aviation
  - Subcommittee on Railroads, Pipelines, and Hazardous Materials
  - Subcommittee on Water Resources and Environment (Ranking Member)

=== Caucus memberships ===
- Congressional Black Caucus
- Congressional Arts Caucus
- Congressional NextGen 9-1-1 Caucus
- Congressional Progressive Caucus
- Congressional Equality Caucus
- Medicare for All Caucus
- Congressional Caucus on Turkey and Turkish Americans
- Congressional Taiwan Caucus
- Congressional Caucus for the Equal Rights Amendment

=== 2010 election ===
When Kendrick Meek retired from Florida's 17th congressional district to run for the United States Senate in 2010, Wilson ran for the open seat and won the Democratic nomination. She won the November 2 general election without electoral opposition in a district where the Democratic nomination is tantamount to election.

=== Tenure ===
During the 117th Congress, Wilson voted with President Joe Biden's stated position 100% of the time according to a FiveThirtyEight analysis.

During the 119th Congress, Wilson has not appeared in Congress since April 17, 2026, missing 43 consecutive votes as of May 13, 2026; although she has remained active on social media, she has not provided a public explanation of this absence. By June 2026, Wilson had missed 44.5% of all votes in 2026.

==== Education ====
During her career as an educator, Wilson founded the 5000 Role Models program, which seeks to bring down dropout rates. Since her time in the Florida legislature, she has strongly opposed standardized testing. She has expressed concern with the Florida Comprehensive Assessment Test (FCAT), suggesting that the funds spent administering it would be better spent on improving education by hiring more teachers, and proposing in 2012 that tutoring companies be banned from exploiting vulnerable children, "even if it means banning companies like Ignite! Learning, founded by ex-Governor Jeb Bush's brother, Neil".

==== Tea Party ====
Wilson has vocally opposed the Tea Party. At a Miami town hall meeting in 2011, she told citizens to remember that the Tea Party is the real enemy and that they hold Congress hostage. She said they had one goal: "to make President Obama a one-term president".

==== Trayvon Martin case ====
Wilson took a vocal stance in the death of Trayvon Martin, a constituent of hers whose family she said she had known all her life. She was both praised and criticized for saying shortly after the killing that the motive of the accused, George Zimmerman, was racism. She suggested in March 2012 that Zimmerman had "hunted" Martin based simply on his race. She said, "Mr. Zimmerman should be arrested immediately for his own safety."

In March 2012, in a statement on the House floor, Wilson said, "Justice must be served. No more racial profiling!" Calling the incident a "classic example of racial profiling quickly followed by murder", she called for Zimmerman to be arrested. Wilson organized a rally in Miami on April 1, 2012, calling for Zimmerman's imprisonment. She criticized Florida's self-defense gun law, the "Stand Your Ground" law, in the wake of Martin's killing, even though she voted for it as a legislator. She said that when new laws work against the people, the laws "should be looked at and repealed". In April 2012, Wilson said that Martin's death was "definitely" murder. On July 13, 2013, a jury acquitted Zimmerman of the charges of second-degree murder and manslaughter.

Concern was raised about Wilson's outspoken comments, with some asking if her rhetoric was "making it more difficult for the prosecutor to do her job". Wilson has been calling for tougher laws to prevent racial profiling.

==== Anti-hazing ====
Wilson led efforts to combat bullying and hazing both as the South Atlantic regional director for Alpha Kappa Alpha sorority and as a member of Congress. A Miami Herald reporter nicknamed her "The Haze Buster" for her public stance against hazing. She was part of a coalition of African-American fraternity and sorority leaders who launched an anti-hazing campaign after the 2011 death of Florida A&M drum major Robert Champion Jr.

==== Recognition ====
MSNBC's "The Grio", an African-American news and opinion platform, named Wilson to "The Grio 100" for 2012.

==== Shooting of Charles Kinsey ====
After the release of the video showing police shooting mental health therapist Charles Kinsey in her district, Wilson tweeted in July 2016 that she was shocked and angered by Kinsey's shooting, adding, "Like everyone else I have one question: Why?"

==== Death of La David Johnson ====
Following the death of Sergeant La David Johnson on October 4, 2017, in an attack in Niger, Wilson told the press that on October 16, 2017, President Donald Trump had called Johnson's widow while she was on the way to Miami International Airport for the arrival of Johnson's remains. In the car with her were Johnson's mother and other family members, as well as Wilson, a longtime friend of the family. The widow put the call on speakerphone so that Wilson and others in the car heard it. Wilson said Trump "was almost like joking" and that he said "he [Johnson] knew what he signed up for, but I guess it still hurt". Trump later called Wilson's characterization of the conversation a "fabrication". Johnson's mother confirmed Wilson's account on October 18, at which point the White House ceased disputing Wilson's account of the call and instead claimed that she was "mischaracterizing the spirit" of the conversation. On October 23, Johnson's widow also confirmed Wilson's account.

On October 19, 2017, White House Chief of Staff John F. Kelly gave a press briefing at the White House. A gold star parent who was present at Trump's end during the phone conversation, Kelly did not deny that Trump said the words reported. But he defended Trump's comments "forcefully and emotionally", saying that Trump "in his way tried to express that opinion that he's a brave man, a fallen hero". He also attacked Wilson for having listened to the phone call and claimed that she had a "history of politicizing what should be sacred moments", citing the 2015 dedication of an FBI field office in Miami as an example. He claimed that her speech at that ceremony was "about how she was instrumental in getting the funding for that building" from then-President Obama.

The details of Kelly's statement were disproven by the video recording of the event. During her nine-minute speech, Wilson spoke for less than three minutes about leading an effort to expedite a bill through Congress. The bill's purpose was naming the FBI building after two FBI agents slain in the line of duty; the bill would normally not have become law in time for the building's dedication ceremony. Wilson dedicated the remainder of her speech to acknowledging other politicians involved in the effort, thanking FBI personnel, and talking about the slain agents. The FBI secured the building's funding in 2009, before Wilson became a congresswoman in 2011. The Miami Herald reported that Kelly had misquoted the cost of the building as $20 million versus the actual $194 million. As a result, several newspapers have called for Kelly to apologize to Wilson. The White House said the video did not capture all of Wilson's comments.

==== Impeachment votes ====
On December 18, 2019, Wilson voted to impeach Donald Trump.

On November 10, 2026, Wilson missed the House vote on the impeachment of Pete Hegseth as Secretary of Defense. Wilson did not respond to media requests for an explanation.

=== 2026 retirement ===
In May 2026, Wilson announced that she was retiring and would not seek reelection. She did not immediately endorse a successor, until naming Oliver Gilbert in June 2026.

== Personal life ==
Wilson married Paul Wilson in 1963 and was widowed when he died in 1988. She has three children. She is an Episcopalian.

Wilson is an avid wearer of hats. She has a large collection that includes hundreds of hats of different varieties. She is known to wear one every day. During the tenure of former House Speaker John Boehner, she unsuccessfully asked him to waive the United States House of Representatives ban on head covering. The rule was partially relaxed after the election of two Muslim women to congress in 2018, one of whom, Ilhan Omar, wore a hijab to her swearing in on January 3, 2019.

Wilson is a member of The Links, and of the Alpha Kappa Alpha sorority.

== Electoral history ==
=== Florida House of Representatives ===
Florida State House election, 1998: District 104
Primary election
Party	Candidate	Votes	%
Democratic	Frederica Wilson	3,850	50.67%
Democratic	Shirley Gibson	1,691	22.26%
Democratic	Jacques Despinosse	1,449	19.07%
Democratic	Bernard Jennings	277	3.65%
Democratic	Kevin Fabiano	178	2.34%
Democratic	Judith Goode	153	2.01%
Total votes		7,598	100
General election
Democratic	Frederica Wilson	15,602	85.23%
Republican	Clyde Pettaway	2,703	14.77%
Total votes		18,305	100
Democratic hold			

Florida State House election, 2000: District 104
Primary election
Party	Candidate	Votes	%
Democratic	Frederica Wilson (incumbent)	unopposed	100%
General election
Democratic	Frederica Wilson (incumbent)	unopposed	100%
Total votes		N/A	100
Democratic hold			

=== Florida Senate ===
Florida State Senate election, 2002: District 33
Primary election
Party	Candidate	Votes	%
Democratic	Frederica Wilson	33,000	72.30%
Democratic	M. Tina Dupree	8,044	17.62%
Democratic	John D. Pace Jr.	4,599	10.08%
Total votes		45,643	100
General election
Democratic	Frederica Wilson	72,612	100%
Write-in		2	0.00%
Total votes		72,614	100
Democratic hold			

Florida State Senate election, 2006: District 33
Primary election
Party	Candidate	Votes	%
Democratic	Frederica Wilson (incumbent)	unopposed	100%
General election
Democratic	Frederica Wilson (incumbent)	unopposed	100%
Total votes		N/A	100
Democratic hold			

=== U.S. House of Representatives ===
US House election, 2010: Florida District 17
Primary election
Party	Candidate	Votes	%
Democratic	Frederica Wilson	17,047	34.47%
Democratic	Rudy Moise	7,986	16.15%
Democratic	Shirley Gibson	5,900	11.93%
Democratic	Yolly Roberson	5,080	10.27%
Democratic	Phillip Brutus	4,173	8.44%
Democratic	Marleine Bastien	2,967	6.00%
Democratic	Scott Galvin	2,750	5.56%
Democratic	James Bush, III	2,693	5.45%
Democratic	Andre Williams	856	1.73%
Total votes		49,452	100
General election
Democratic	Frederica Wilson	106,361	86.21%
Independent	Roderick D. Vereen	17,009	13.79%
Total votes		123,370	100
Democratic hold			

US House election, 2012: Florida District 24
Primary election
Party	Candidate	Votes	%
Democratic	Frederica Wilson (incumbent)	42,807	66.38%
Democratic	Rudy Moise	21,680	33.62%
Total votes		64,487	100
General election
Democratic	Frederica Wilson (incumbent)	unopposed	100%
Democratic hold			

US House election, 2014: Florida District 24
Primary election
Party	Candidate	Votes	%
Democratic	Frederica Wilson (incumbent)	35,456	80.43%
Democratic	Michael Etienne	8,628	19.57%
Total votes		44,084	100
General election
Democratic	Frederica Wilson (incumbent)	129,192	86.17%
Republican	Dufirstson Julio Neree	15,239	10.16%
Independent	Luis Fernandez	5,487	3.66%
Total votes		149,918	100
Democratic hold			

US House election, 2016: Florida District 24
Primary election
Party	Candidate	Votes	%
Democratic	Frederica Wilson (incumbent)	50,822	78.37%
Democratic	Randal Hill	14,023	21.63%
Total votes		64,845	100
General election
Democratic	Frederica Wilson (incumbent)	unopposed	100%
Democratic hold			

US House election, 2018: Florida District 24
Primary election
Party	Candidate	Votes	%
Democratic	Frederica Wilson (incumbent)	66,202	83.67%
Democratic	Ricardo De La Fuente	12,924	16.33%
Total votes		79,126	100
General election
Democratic	Frederica Wilson (incumbent)	unopposed	100%
Democratic hold			

US House election, 2020: Florida District 24
Primary election
Party	Candidate	Votes	%
Democratic	Frederica Wilson (incumbent)	68,505	84.67%
Democratic	Sakinah Letola	6,267	7.75%
Democratic	Ricardo De La Fuente	6,134	7.58%
Total votes		80,906	100
General election
Democratic	Frederica Wilson (incumbent)	218,825	75.55%
Republican	Lavern Spicer	59,084	20.40%
Independent	Christine Alexandria Olivo	11,703	4.04%
Write-in		26	0.01%
Total votes		289,638	100
Democratic hold			

US House election, 2022: Florida District 24
Primary election
Party	Candidate	Votes	%
Democratic	Frederica Wilson (incumbent)	56,776	89.28%
Democratic	Kevin C. Harris	6,816	10.72%
Total votes		63,592	100
General election
Democratic	Frederica Wilson (incumbent)	133,442	71.79%
Republican	Jesus Navarro	52,449	28.21%
Total votes		185,891	100
Democratic hold			

US House election, 2024: Florida District 24
Primary election
Party	Candidate	Votes	%
Democratic	Frederica Wilson (incumbent)	unopposed	100%
General election
Democratic	Frederica Wilson (incumbent)	194,874	68.24%
Republican	Jesus Navarro	90,692	31.76%
Write-in		22	0.01%
Total votes		285,588	100
Democratic hold			

== See also ==
- List of African-American United States representatives
- Women in the United States House of Representatives

U.S. House of Representatives
Preceded by Kendrick Meek	Member of the U.S. House of Representatives from Florida's 17th congressional district 2011–2013	Succeeded by Tom Rooney
Preceded by Sandy Adams	Member of the U.S. House of Representatives from Florida's 24th congressional district 2013–present	Incumbent
U.S. order of precedence (ceremonial)
Preceded by Daniel Webster	United States representatives by seniority 91st	Succeeded by Steve Womack
