= William H. Turner (politician) =

American politician

William H. Turner (August 1, 1931 – November 1, 2002) was an African-American school board member and state senator from Miami, Florida. He was a pioneer of racial integration, serving as the first black school board member in Dade County, and a supporter of education in the Florida legislature.

== Early life and career ==
Turner was born in 1931, in the black community of Overtown in Miami. His parents died while he was young, leaving him to be raised by his grandmother. He attended Dunbar Elementary and Booker T. Washington High School. He graduated from Bethune-Cookman College, in Daytona, Florida, in 1956, with a bachelor's degree in education.

He returned to Miami, where he worked as a police officer for a year before becoming an elementary school teacher in 1957. He continued to work as an educator for 13 years, both as a teacher and an administrator. During that time, he pursued a Masters of Education degree from the University of Miami, which he earned in 1969. In 1982, he also received a Doctor of Law degree from Faith College in Birmingham, AL.

== Political career ==
Turner began his political career in 1970, when he ran for the board of the county-wide school system and won the election over a white opponent. Turner became the first African-American to serve on the Dade County School Board. He served on the board until 1978, when he lost his re-election bid amid allegations of mismanaging funds for a community program he oversaw. Turner was eventually cleared of any criminal wrongdoing regarding those allegations, and he returned to working as a school administrator.

In 1982, he ran again for the school board and was elected. He remained on the school board for the next 10 years, during two of which (1989-1991) he served as board chair. While on the board, Turner strongly supported desegregation, multicultural education, and school safety projects. Shortly before he left the board, it named a new vocational high school after him. William H. Turner Technical Arts High School opened in Miami in 1993.

Turner's time on the Dade County School Board ended in 1992, when he decided to vacate his seat in order to run for the Florida Senate. District 36, which included the areas of Allapattah, Liberty City, part of Little Havana, Opa-locka, El Portal, and Miami Shores, was without an incumbent, because the previous senator, Carrie Meek, was running for U.S. Congress. Turner beat State Rep. James Burke by 25 votes in the Democratic primary, winning the seat. Turner spent one 4-year term in the senate, before being defeated by his predecessor's son, Kendrick Meek, in 1996.

== Death and legacy ==
Turner died in his sleep of natural causes in Miami on November 1, 2002.

Miami's William H Turner Technical Arts School is named for him.
