= Carrie Meek =

American politician and educator (1926–2021)

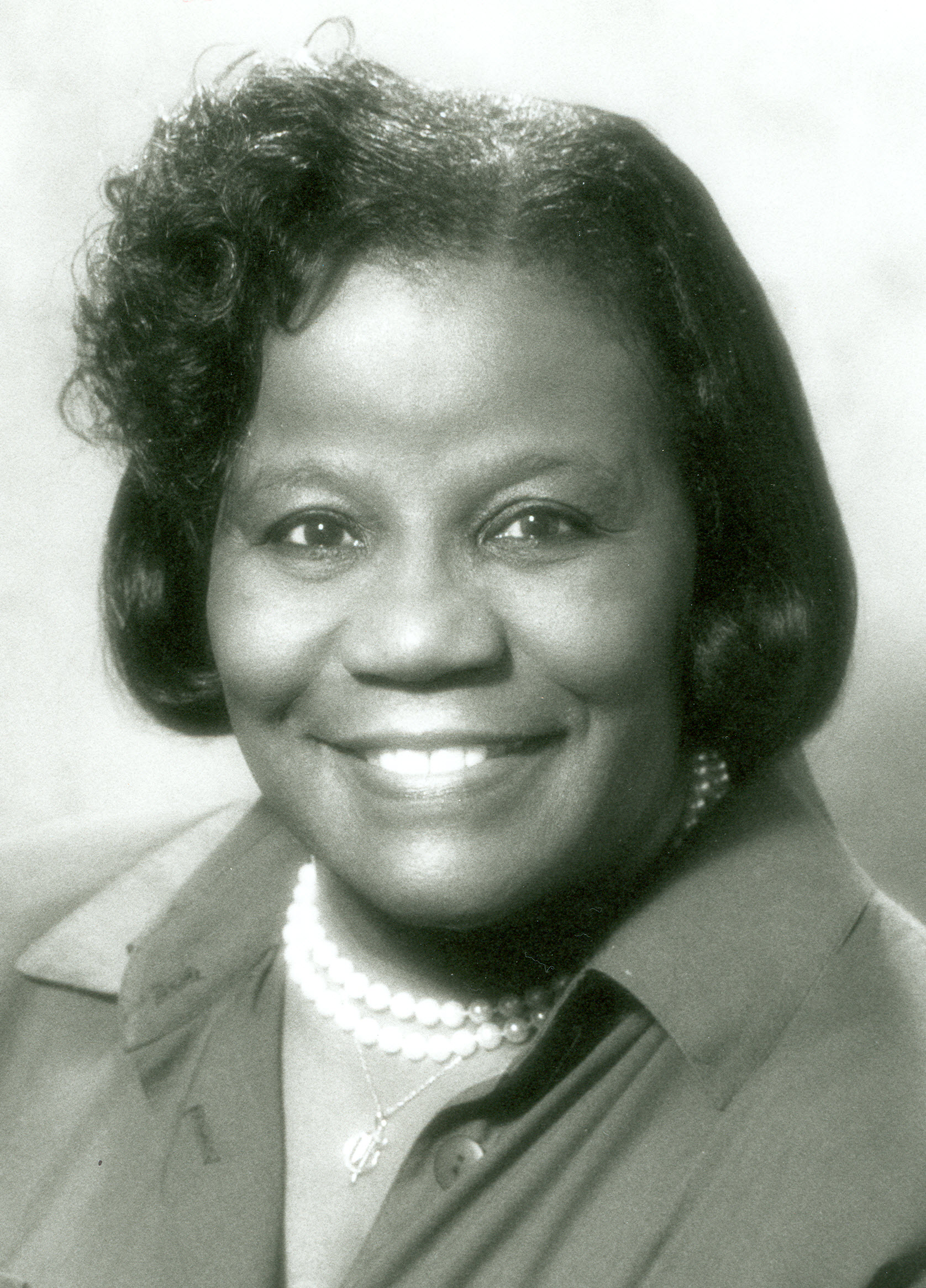
- Meek in 1993

Member of the U.S. House of Representatives from Florida's 17th district
- In office January 3, 1993 – January 3, 2003
- Preceded by: William Lehman
- Succeeded by: Kendrick Meek

Member of the Florida Senate from the 36th district
- In office November 2, 1982 – November 3, 1992
- Preceded by: Redistricted
- Succeeded by: William H. Turner

Member of the Florida House of Representatives from the 106th district
- In office March 27, 1979 – November 2, 1982
- Preceded by: Gwen Cherry
- Succeeded by: Redistricted

Personal details
- Born: Carrie Mae Pittman; April 29, 1926 Tallahassee, Florida, U.S.
- Died: November 28, 2021 (aged 95) Miami, Florida, U.S.
- Party: Democratic
- Spouses: Lucius Davis (div. 1963); Harold H. Meek (divorced)
- Children: 3, including Kendrick Meek
- Education: Florida A&M College; (BS) University of Michigan; (MS)
- Occupation: Educator; legislator

Carrie Mae Meek (née Pittman; April 29, 1926 – November 28, 2021) was an American politician and educator who served as the U.S. representative for Florida's 17th congressional district from 1993 to 2003. She was the first African American elected to represent Florida in the United States Congress since Reconstruction. A member of the Democratic Party, she served in the Florida House of Representatives from 1979 to 1982 and in the Florida Senate from 1982 to 1992.

== Early life and education ==
Carrie Mae Pittman was born on April 29, 1926, in Tallahassee, Florida, where she was raised, the youngest of 12 children of Willie and Carrie Pittman. She was the daughter of sharecroppers and granddaughter of a slave.

Meek was a graduate of Lincoln High School. She remained in north Florida for college and was graduated from Florida A&M University (a historically black university then known as Florida A&M College for Negroes) in 1946. Her degree was in physical education and biology, and she also lettered in track and field. At that time, African Americans were not allowed to be admitted to graduate schools in Florida, so Meek enrolled in the University of Michigan and received her master of science degree in 1948.

== Academic career ==
After graduation from the University of Michigan, Meek was hired as a teacher at Bethune-Cookman College, another historically black college in Daytona Beach, Florida. Following that, she taught at her alma mater, Florida A&M University. Meek moved to Miami in 1961 to serve as special assistant to the vice president of Miami-Dade Community College. Largely due to Meek's integral role in the administration of the college during the push for its integration, the college was desegregated in 1963.

Throughout her years as an educator, Meek was also active in community projects in the Miami area.

== Political career ==
=== Florida Legislature ===
When state representative Gwen Cherry, Florida's first woman African American legislator, died in a car crash in 1979, Meek decided to run in the special election to succeed her. She was elected to the Florida House as a Democrat. As a state representative, she introduced a bill criminalizing stalking. She served until 1982.

In 1982, Meek ran for a newly drawn state senate seat based in northern Dade County. She became the first African American woman elected to the Florida Senate. As a state senator, Meek served on the education appropriations subcommittee. Her efforts in the legislature led to the construction of thousands of affordable rental housing units.

=== U.S. House of Representatives ===
In 1992, a court-ordered congressional redistricting plan drew three districts with a substantial African American population that were designed to elect black candidates of choice to comply with the federal Voting Rights Act. Meek ran for one of those seats, the 17th district, which was based in northern Dade County. Along with Corrine Brown and Alcee Hastings, Meek became the first black member of Congress from Florida since Post-Civil War Reconstruction Era.

Upon taking office, Meek faced the task of helping her district recover from Hurricane Andrew's devastation. Her efforts as the only freshman Democrat on the House Appropriations Committee helped to provide $100 million in federal assistance to rebuild Dade County. Also while in the House, Meek successfully focused her attention on issues such as economic development, health care, education, and housing. She led legislation through Congress to improve Dade County's transit system, airport, and seaport; to construct a new family and childcare center in northern Dade County; and to fund advanced aviation training programs at Miami-Dade Community College. Meek emerged as a strong advocate for Haitian immigrants and senior citizens.

Meek believed that her district was undercounted in the 1990 Census and that the votes of her constituents were not represented correctly in the 2000 presidential election. Meek and other members of the U.S. House of Representatives objected to the 25 electoral votes from Florida that George W. Bush narrowly won after a contentious recount. Because no U.S. senator joined her objection, it had to be dismissed during the certification of the votes of the Electoral College by Vice President Al Gore while he was overseeing the recount that was his vice presidential role in the senate. Gore had been Bush's opponent in the race.

Meek never lost a race for reelection to the U.S. House of Representatives. She announced that she would not seek re-election in the 2002 election, and retired from the House at the end of her term in January 2003. Her son, Kendrick Meek, ran for her vacated seat and succeeded her.

== Personal life ==
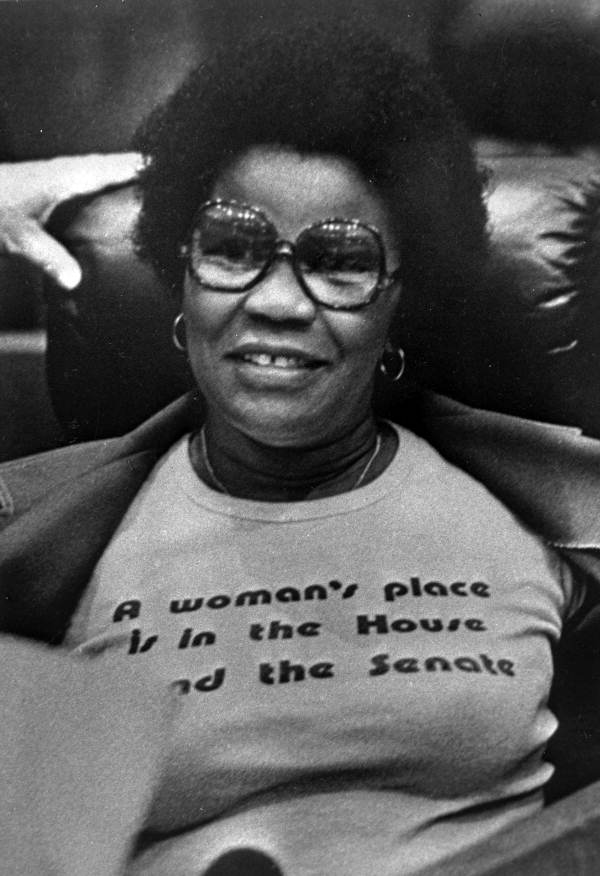
Representative Carrie Meek in the Florida House chamber in 1980, in this photograph, Meek is shown wearing a t-shirt that reads "A woman's place is in the House and the Senate"

Meek was married twice. Her husbands were Lucius Davis and Harold Meek. Both marriages ended in divorce. She had three children, two daughters, and a son, Kendrick Meek.

Known for her liberal opinions, once while discussing why she was a Democrat, she said, "The last Republican that did something for me was Abraham Lincoln".

After her retirement from politics, she spent much of her time running the Carrie Meek Foundation, which she had founded in 2001 to provide resources and opportunities for those living in her Miami-Dade community. She stepped down for health reasons in 2015.

She died at her home in Miami on November 28, 2021, at the age of 95.

== Awards and honors ==
The Carrie Meek – James N. Eaton, Sr. Southeastern Regional Black Archives Research Center and Museum in Tallahassee, Florida, on the campus of Florida A&M University, was co-named in Meek's honor.

She was a member of Delta Sigma Theta sorority, and an honorary member of Iota Phi Lambda sorority.

Meek was also awarded honorary degrees by a number of institutions, including Florida A&M University, University of Miami, Barry University, Florida Atlantic University, and Rollins College.

== Electoral history ==
Florida's 17th congressional district: Results 1992–2000
Year	Democrat	Votes	Pct	Republican	Votes	Pct	
1992	Carrie P. Meek	102,784	100%	(no candidate)			*
1994	Carrie P. Meek (incumbent)	75,756	100%	(no candidate)			*
1996	Carrie P. Meek (incumbent)	114,638	89%	Wellington Rolle	14,525	11%	*
1998	Carrie P. Meek (incumbent)	*		(no candidate)			
2000	Carrie P. Meek (incumbent)	100,715	100%	(no candidate)			*

Write-in and minor candidate notes: In 1992, write-ins received 15 votes. In 1994, write-ins received 11 votes. In 1996, write-ins received two votes. In 1998, the election was uncontested with no write-ins, so Meek's vote total was not recorded. In 2000, write-ins received three votes.

== See also ==
- List of African-American United States representatives
- Women in the United States House of Representatives

U.S. House of Representatives
Preceded by William Lehman	Member of the U.S. House of Representatives from Florida's 17th congressional district 1993–2003	Succeeded by Kendrick Meek
