= H. H. Coleman =

- Born: Horatius Holipheal Coleman; February 22, 1892; Sandersville, Georgia, United States
- Died: December 13, 1969 (aged 77); Detroit, Michigan, United States
- Spouse(s): Mamie L. Coleman (née Jordan), Bertha Coleman (Bentley) 2 children = Juanita Meek Brown (b. 1914), Rev. Horatius H.Coleman Jr. (b. 1938)
- Congregations served: Greater Macedonia Baptist Church, Detroit, Michigan New Bethel Baptist Church, Detroit, Michigan First Baptist Institutional Church, Detroit, Michigan Beulah Baptist Church, Atlanta, Georgia

Horatius Holipheal Coleman (February 22, 1892 – December 13, 1969) was an American church pastor and evangelist. Reverend Coleman, who was born in Sandersville, Georgia, was senior pastor of Greater Macedonia Baptist Church in Detroit, Michigan, from 1935 until his death in 1969. He was the paternal great-grandfather of former U.S. Representative Kendrick B. Meek, and the maternal grandfather of actress Barbara Meek.

Rev. Coleman was a good friend of Rev. Martin Luther King Sr., father of Dr. Martin Luther King Jr. On May 3, 1936, King Jr. (age 7) was baptized at Ebenezer Baptist Church in Atlanta, Georgia, after a two-week annual revival that was led by Rev. H. H. Coleman (serving as guest evangelist).
