= Barbara Meek =

American actress (1934–2015)

- Meek in Archie Bunker's Place, 1980
- Born: Barbara Anita Meek; February 26, 1934; Detroit, Michigan, U.S.
- Died: October 3, 2015 (aged 81); Providence, Rhode Island, U.S.
- Occupation: Actress
- Years active: 1965–2012
- Spouse(s): Jonathan Gallimore (divorced) Martin Molson (m. 1968; died 1980)
- Children: 1

Barbara Anita Meek (February 26, 1934 – October 3, 2015) was an American actress best known to television viewers for playing the character of Ellen Canby for two seasons on Archie Bunker's Place. Since 1968, Meek was an active member of the Trinity Repertory Company in Providence, Rhode Island, and appeared in more than 100 Trinity Rep stage productions.

== Early life ==
Meek was born on February 26, 1934, in Detroit, Michigan, to Juanita (née Coleman) and Harold Meek, and is the maternal granddaughter of the Reverend Horatius "H.H." Coleman, pastor of the Greater Macedonia Baptist Church. As a child, Meeks took lessons in acting, dancing, and piano. She was a graduate of Northwestern High School and attended Highland Park Junior College. At Wayne State University she graduated with a BA degree in mass communications in 1966 before pursuing studies in graduate theater program. Meek was a member of the Alpha Kappa Alpha sorority while attending college.

Meek's debut on stage came in a children's theater production in Detroit in 1950. She gained early experience in theater in productions at the Detroit Institute of Arts. In 1965, Meek toured with the United Services Organization, performing for wounded soldiers on Okinawa and other U.S. Army bases. In 1968, she joined the Trinity Repertory Company with her husband, Martin Molson (1928–1980), where they debuted together in Brother to Dragons.

== Career at Trinity ==
Meek performed in more than 100 productions of the Trinity Repertory Company. Highlights of Meek's stage career at Trinity included leading roles in the August Wilson plays Fences and Ma Rainey's Black Bottom, James Purdy's Eustace Chisholm and the Works, Athol Fugard's Boesman and Lena, Peer Gynt, The Threepenny Opera, Tartuffe, The Visit, Fires in the Mirror, Adrian Hall and Robert Cumming's adaptation of A Christmas Carol (including the role of Ebenezer Scrooge), Terrence McNally's Master Class, Henry IV, Tennessee Williams' Suddenly Last Summer and, more recently, Lorraine Hansberry's Raisin in the Sun and Oscar Wilde's The Importance of Being Earnest. On Broadway, Meek was a singer in Wilson in the Promise Land (1970) and an understudy in Division Street (1980).

In 2008, Meek appeared in Blithe Spirit at Trinity Rep, and Curt Columbus' adaptation of Antigone. She was in Camelot, The Crucible and Steel Magnolias during the 2010–2011 season, and Sparrow Grass in the 2011–2012 season.

== Other stage performances ==
Meek played the role of Sadie in Having Our Say at Trinity Rep, a role she reprised for the play's European premiere at Vienna's English Theatre. In 1996, Meek appeared in the world premiere of A Lesson Before Dying by Romulus Linney at the Alabama Shakespeare Festival. Meek also performed at Hilberry Repertory Theatre, the Dallas Theater Center, the Cleveland Play House, The Repertory Theater of St. Louis, the Hampton Playhouse, The Eugene O’Neill Theater Center and the Brandeis University Theatre.

== Television roles ==
Meek played housekeeper Ellen Canby on Archie Bunker’s Place for four seasons, ending in 1983. Her other television roles included Adrian Hall's adaptations of Robert Penn Warren's Brother to Dragons, Edith Wharton's The House of Mirth, and Harriet Beecher Stowe's Life Among the Lowly, all broadcast on PBS; Melba, starring Melba Moore, on CBS; and Big Brother Jake, starring Jake Steinfeld, on The Family Channel. Meek was also featured in the Emmy Award-winning television movie See How She Runs with Joanne Woodward, and the television movie Jimmy B. and Andre, starring Susan Clark and Alex Karras.

Meek made guest appearances as Veronica Everestt on As the World Turns in both 1992 and 1997, Samantha Monroe on General Hospital in 1994 and 1999, and Verne Garrison on Guiding Light in both 1993 and 1999.

== Honors ==
Ms. Meek received an Honorary Doctor of Arts Degree from the University of Rhode Island, and the 2004 Pell Award for Excellence in the Arts. She also received the Foundation for Repertory Theatre Award, the Wayne State University Arts Achievement Award in Theatre, and the Elliot Norton Prize in 2002, the latter in recognition of her sustained excellence.

In 2006, she was awarded the Edward Bannister and Christiana Bannister History Makers Award from the Rhode Island Black Heritage Society.

== Personal life and death ==
Meek was married to, and divorced from, Jonathan Gallimore. She also married Martin Molson, whom she met when she was a graduate theater student, in February 1968. (A published source quotes Meek: "In 1967, after I'd married Martin ...") They separated but remained married until his death on May 28, 1980. They have a daughter, Leslie Matuko Molson. Meek died on October 3, 2015, of a heart attack at her home in Providence, Rhode Island, aged 81..
