= Gwen Cherry =

American politician and educator (1923–1979)

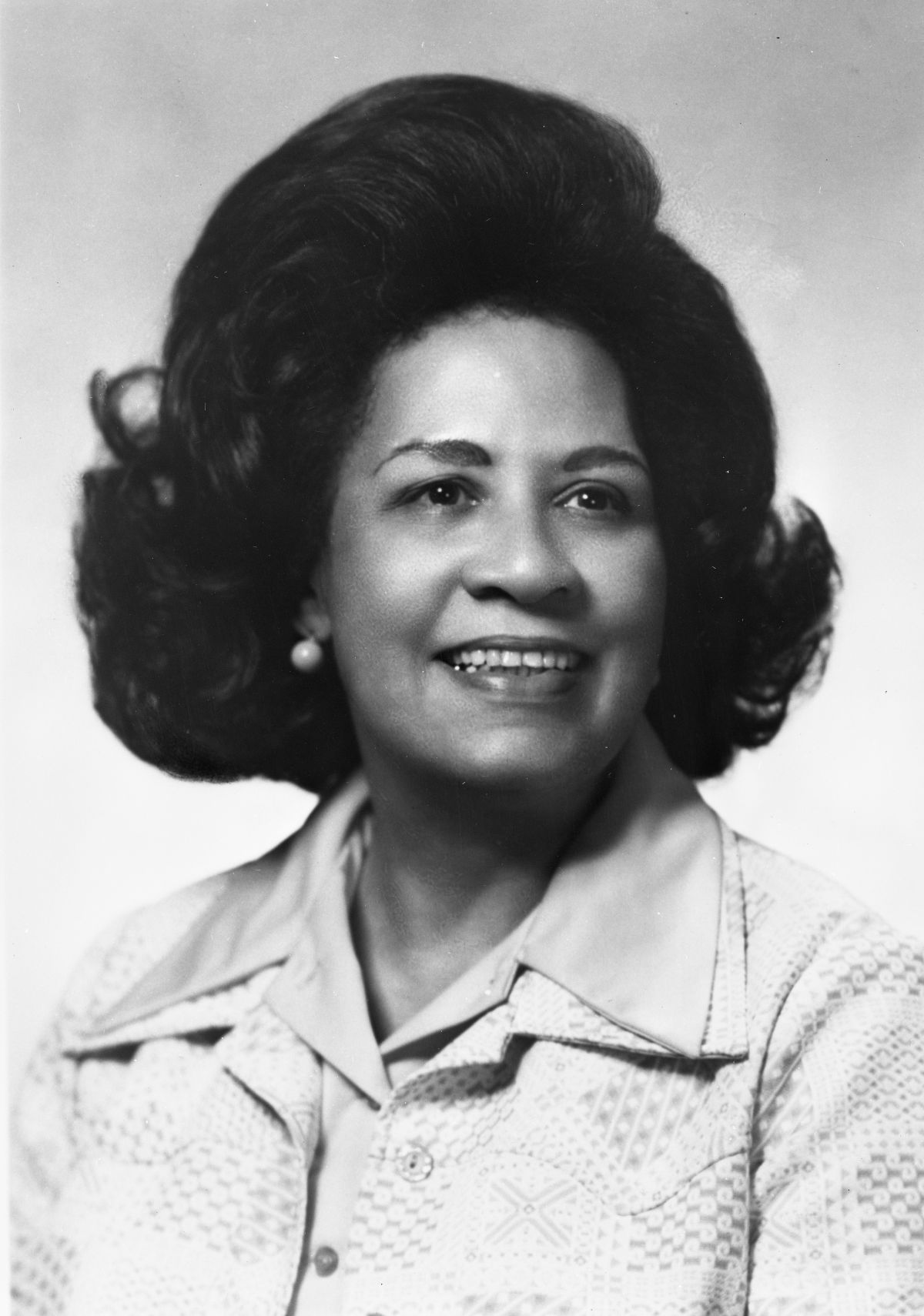
- Cherry in 1978

Member of the Florida House of Representatives from the 106th district
- In office November 3, 1970 – February 7, 1979
- Preceded by: Gerald Lewis
- Succeeded by: Carrie Meek

Personal details
- Born: Gwendolyn Sawyer; August 27, 1923 Miami, Florida, U.S.
- Died: February 7, 1979 (aged 55) Tallahassee, Florida, U.S.
- Party: Democratic
- Spouse(s): Robert Barnett (m. 1946; div. 1959), James L. Cherry (m. 1961; her death)
- Children: Mary Elizabeth Barnett, William Barnett
- Occupation: Member of the Florida House of Representatives

Gwendolyn Sawyer Cherry (August 27, 1923 – February 7, 1979) was an American politician in the state of Florida. She was a member of the Florida House of Representatives from the 106th district. The first African-American woman to win election to the Florida Legislature, she served from 1970 until 1979.

== Early life ==
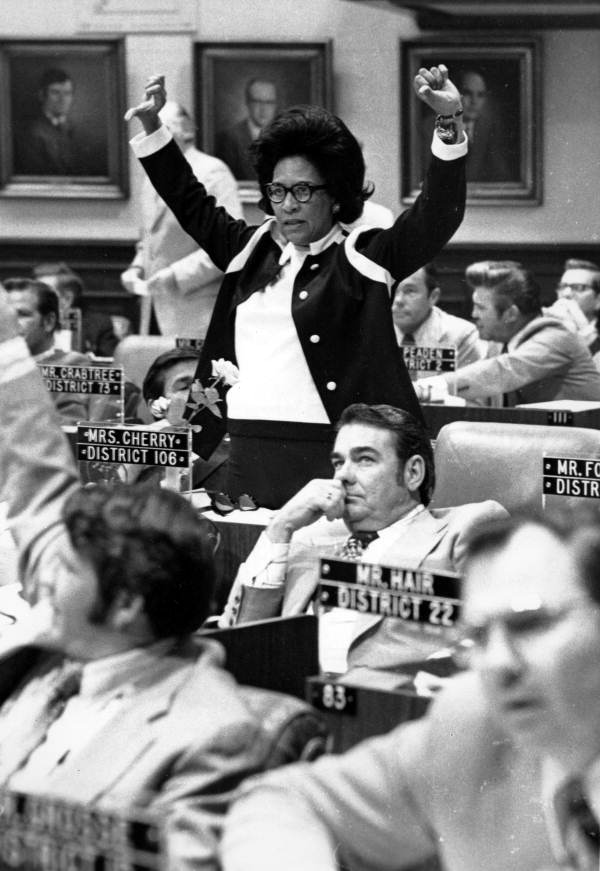
Representative Gwen Cherry votes no - Tallahassee, Florida.

Cherry was born in Miami, Florida. Her father, William Sawyer, was one of the first African-American doctors in the city. She attended Florida Agricultural and Mechanical University (FAMU) where she received her undergraduate degree and, later, her Juris Doctor. She was a member of Sigma Gamma Rho sorority. She taught in the Miami Public Schools for more than 20 years, and she also served as a law professor at FAMU. She was admitted to the Florida Bar in 1965, and she became the first African-American woman to practice law in Dade County.

== Political career ==
Cherry (left) posing for a photograph with Congresswoman Shirley Chisholm at the 1972 Democratic National Convention

Cherry was a high school science teacher before attendng law school at Florida A&M University. As an African-American woman, much of her career was pioneering. Cherry was a founder of the National Association of Black Women Attorneys. She was a Democrat. After careers as a teacher and a lawyer, Cherry was elected to the Florida House in 1970, becoming the first African-American woman to serve as a state legislator in Florida. During her four terms, she introduced the Equal Rights Amendment and the Martin Luther King Jr. Day state holiday, chaired the state's committee for International Women's Year in 1978, and co-authored Portraits in Color: the Lives of Colorful Negro Women with Pauline Willis and Ruby Thomas. She also chaired the Minority Affairs Committee for the Democratic National Convention and the National Women's Political Caucus in 1972 while serving as legal counsel for the National Organization for Women (NOW)'s Miami chapter.

== Legacy ==
Cherry died in a Tallahassee car accident in February 1979. In his eulogy, former state governor and U.S. Senator Bob Graham called Gwen Cherry "a champion for the rights of all people and a voice of reason and concern." She was inducted, posthumously, into the Florida Women's Hall of Fame in 1986. Famu's College of Law dedicated a lecture hall in her name. Miami-Dade County, Florida named a park after her which dedicates itself to helping educate children and helping at-risk youths. The Gwen S. Cherry Black Women Lawyers Association (GSCBWLA) formed in 1985 to address the concerns of women lawyers in the community. While it was originally called the National Bar Association Women Lawyers Division Dade County Chapter, it was decided in 2005 to be renamed in Cherry's honor.
