= Kendrick Meek =

American politician (born 1966)

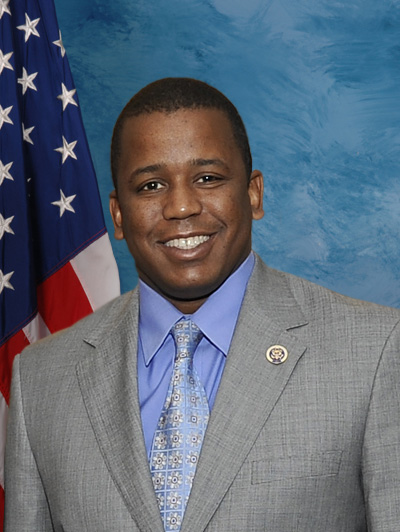

Member of the U.S. House of Representatives from Florida's 17th district
- In office January 3, 2003 – January 3, 2011
- Preceded by: Carrie Meek
- Succeeded by: Frederica Wilson

Member of the Florida Senate from the 36th district
- In office November 3, 1998 – November 5, 2002
- Preceded by: William H. Turner
- Succeeded by: Redistricted

Member of the Florida House of Representatives from the 104th district
- In office November 8, 1994 – November 3, 1998
- Preceded by: Elaine Gordon
- Succeeded by: Frederica Wilson

Personal details
- Born: Kendrick Brett Meek; September 6, 1966 (age 60) Miami, Florida, U.S.
- Party: Democratic
- Spouse(s): Leslie Dixon (divorced) Arshi Siddiqui (m. 2020)
- Children: 2
- Relatives: Carrie Meek (mother)
- Education: Florida A&M University (BS)

Kendrick Brett Meek (born September 6, 1966) is an American politician who served as the U.S. representative for Florida's 17th congressional district from 2003 to 2011. After serving in both houses of the Florida Legislature, Meek was elected to Congress in the 2002 election to succeed his mother Carrie Meek.

Meek was the Democratic nominee in the 2010 Senate election, coming in third behind Republican Marco Rubio and independent candidate Charlie Crist.

== Early life, education and career ==
Kendrick, the son of retired Congresswoman Carrie Meek (née Pittman) and Harold H. Meek, was born on September 6, 1966, in Miami, Florida. He is the great grandson of H. H. Coleman, who was pastor of Greater Macedonia Baptist Church in Detroit, Michigan.

He graduated from Miami Springs High School in Miami, where he played football as a defensive lineman. He received a Bachelor of Science degree in Criminal Justice in 1989 from Florida A&M University. Meek was a star football player in college and also founded the Young Democrats at Florida A&M, later serving as President of the organization. He was also initiated into the Omega Psi Phi fraternity through the Upsilon Psi chapter.

After graduating from college Meek was sworn in as a trooper with the Florida Highway Patrol and was assigned to Miami. During his four-year tenure, Meek became the first African American to reach the rank of captain. He later served on the security detail for Democratic Lieutenant Governor Buddy MacKay and subsequently launched his political career.

== Florida State House of Representatives ==
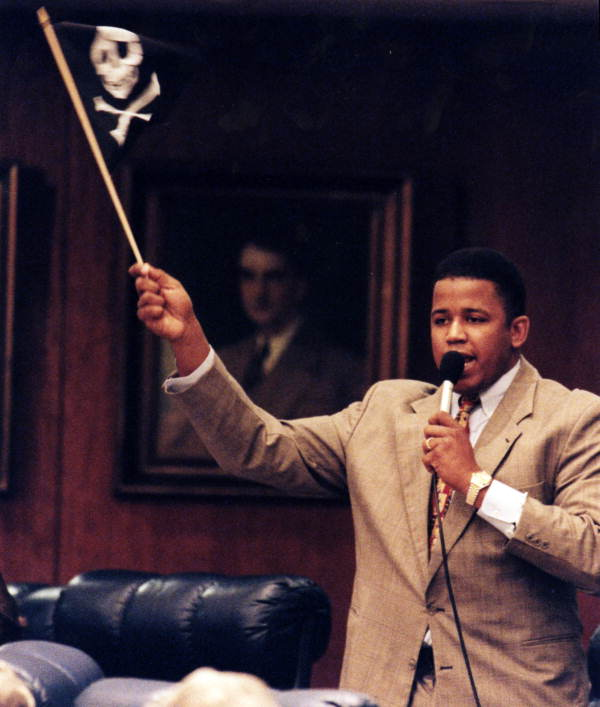
Meek speaking in the Florida House Chamber

Meek (center) joins Miami-Dade County Mayor Alex Penelas (left) in teaching youth to swim at an event in July 1998

Meek served in the Florida House of Representatives from 1995 to 1998. While in the Florida House, Meek worked on various economic and social justice issues. This work culminated in building out a bipartisan coalition to provide compensation for Freddie Lee Pitts and Wilbert Lee, two African Americans who were falsely convicted of murder 35 years earlier. Nineteen different attempts to pass legislation in the state legislature were defeated by a traditional Southern Democratic faction of conservative legislators from the Florida Panhandle. In 1998, Meek reintroduced the bill in the Florida House and successfully allied with Republicans to pass it.

== Florida State Senate ==
From 1998 to 2002, Kendrick Meek was a member of the Florida Senate.

=== One Florida sit-in ===
Meek, along with fellow member Rep. Tony Hill, staged a sit-in protest in Governor Jeb Bush's office in January, 2000. The sit-in lasted for 25 hours, with the central issue being a newly implemented "One Florida" plan to end official race/gender preferences in state government. Meek said he and Hill staged the sit-in after they tried but were unable to get "a meeting with the governor— two members of the Florida legislature. Then the governor came in and was barking at us as though we were children, saying that if we expect for him to rescind his executive order, then we might as well order some blankets and get comfortable, which we did." According to Tom Bearden, when Hill and Meek tried to meet with the Governor, "tempers flared". The two lawmakers and Bush ended the sit-in after Bush agreed to delay implementation of the plan.

In February 2000, Meek said lawsuits might be filed to challenge university regents' authority to use the One Florida Initiative. "I thank God for using you to bring us to this point." Meek and Hill issued a press release on June 23, 2003, applauding the Supreme Court for upholding the legality of affirmative action and criticizing Bush for his One Florida Initiative, calling for an end to the initiative in light of the Supreme Court's ruling, because the initiative has "only served to divide Florida along racial lines." Governor Bush pointed to the .3% increase in minority enrollment in Florida public-universities between 2002 and 2003 as evidence that the One Florida Initiative was working. Meek responded by accusing Bush of throwing out numbers to 'fake out' Floridians, telling Bush he had "better check those numbers two or three times. It's been a struggle for students of African-American descent. That's where the historical discrimination has been." Florida Atlantic University is the only school that had an increase in African-American freshmen, from 17.2% freshman in 2002 to 18.9% in 2003.

=== Class size amendment ===
In 2002, Meek launched an initiative to reduce class sizes in Florida's public schools. The amendment would set the maximum class sizes of pre-kindergarten through 3rd grade classes to 18, 4th through 8th grade classes to 22, and high school classes to 25. It would also require schools to reduce class sizes by two students in 2003 and to reach full compliance by the beginning of the 2010 school year.

Supporters of the amendment, including People for the American Way, Florida Education Association, and Florida NAACP, focused on large classes in many urban areas of Florida which had as many as 40 students: Meek said, "[for] the first time parents will have a chance to vote on something they've always wanted and that is smaller class sizes." Then-Florida governor Jeb Bush and state legislature Republicans opposed the bill because it was unclear how much the amendment would cost: "While this may be a worthy goal, we still have to ask the question, where will the money come from?" said Liz Hirst, press secretary to Governor Bush.

Meek spearheaded a petition drive that collected more than 500,000 signatures, allowing the issue to be listed — as Amendment 9 — on the 2002 ballot. He also guided the amendment through two opposition efforts in the Florida Supreme Court as well as the public campaign to oppose the amendment.

On November 5, 2002, Florida voters approved the amendment 52.4% to 47.6%.

== U.S. House of Representatives ==
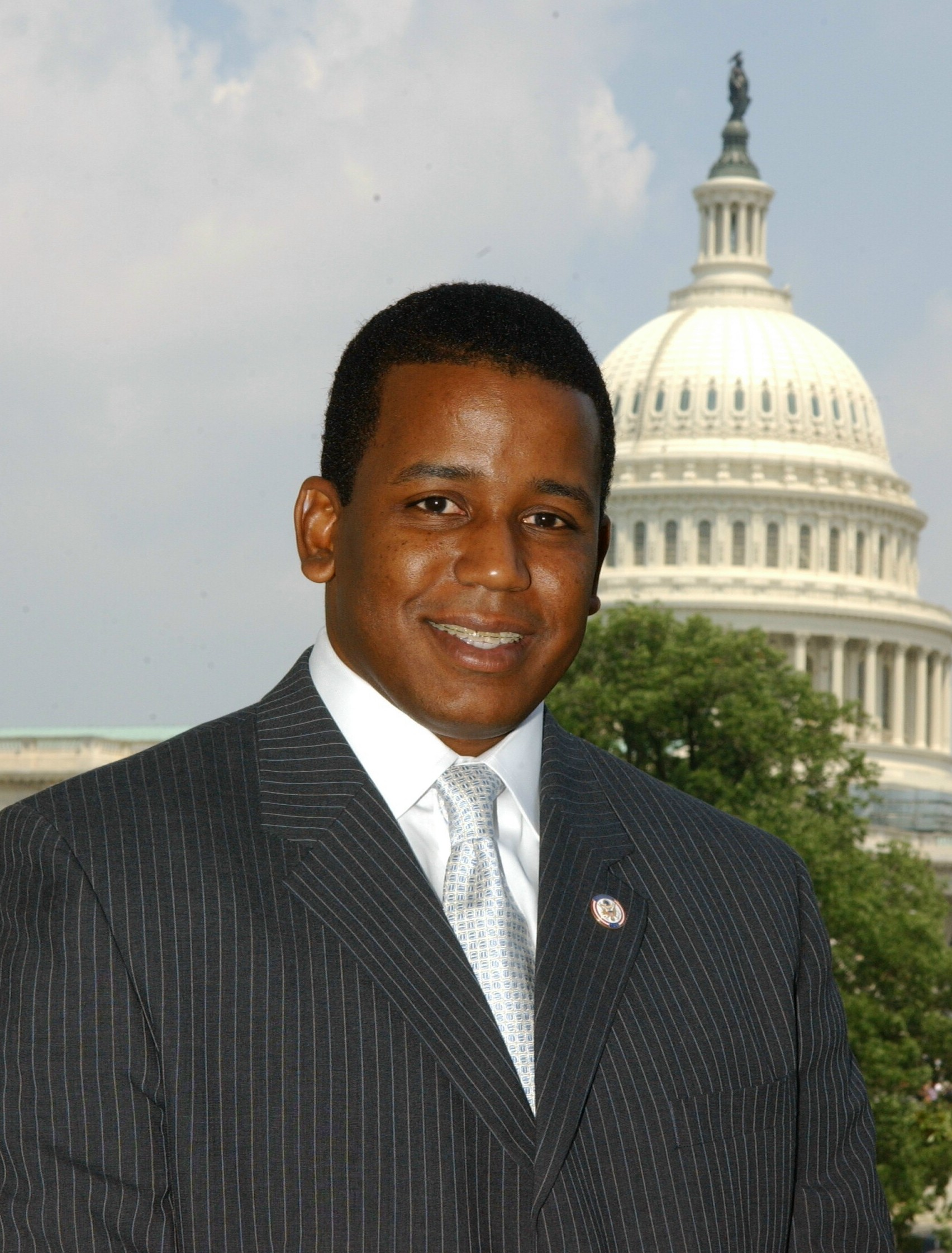
Meek during the 109th Congress

=== Committee assignments ===
- Committee on Ways and Means
  - Subcommittee on Income Security and Family Support
  - Subcommittee on Select Revenue Measures
- NATO Parliamentary Assembly

=== Party leadership and caucus membership ===
- Democratic Steering and Policy Committee
- Congressional Black Caucus
- Chairman of the Board of Directors of the Congressional Black Caucus Foundation

Meek was a member of the New Democrat Coalition. He was also a member of the 30 Something Working Group, a small group of Democrat members who regularly held special order speeches on a variety of topics. Other prominent members included Debbie Wasserman Schultz, Chris Murphy and Tim Ryan.

== Political positions ==
=== Economic issues ===
Meek supports an increase in the minimum wage. He voted for the Emergency Economic Stabilization Act of 2008.

=== Social issues ===
During his time in Congress, Meek consistently opposed the Hyde Amendment, which restricts federal funding of elective abortion. He also opposes some bans on late-term abortions and notification laws for minors who seek an abortion.

Meek voted against H.J. Res. 88, a proposed amendment to the Constitution to ban same-sex marriage, which failed to pass by a vote of 236 to 187. In a statement in the Congressional Record, Meek said:

"This proposed amendment is not directed at any real problem, other than the apparent need of the Republican leadership to gin up political support for their candidates. It is sad that the Republican leadership is not as interested as they say they are in 'protecting' the institution of marriage as they are in waging a campaign to divide and distract the American people from the real issues that need to be addressed. The nation is at war in Iraq; we face crises in Iran, North Korea and Lebanon; the federal deficit is soaring out of control as more and more U.S. debt is controlled by countries like China; energy costs continue to rise and Americans wait for Congress to act to increase the minimum wage. The Republican response: wasting hours of debate on an unnecessary Constitutional amendment that had already been defeated in the Senate."

During the 2010 Senate campaign, Meek expressed support for gay adoption which had previously been banned in Florida, and referred to Governor Charlie Crist as "the George Wallace of gay adoptions".

== Political campaigns ==
Meek was elected to the U.S. House of Representatives on November 5, 2002, succeeding his mother, Congresswoman Carrie Meek, who retired from the seat.

In Meek's four elections to the U.S. House of Representatives, no Republican or third-party candidate had been listed on the general election ballot running against him. He had write-in opponents in three of the four elections and also had a Democratic primary opponent in 2006.

=== 2010 U.S. Senate campaign ===
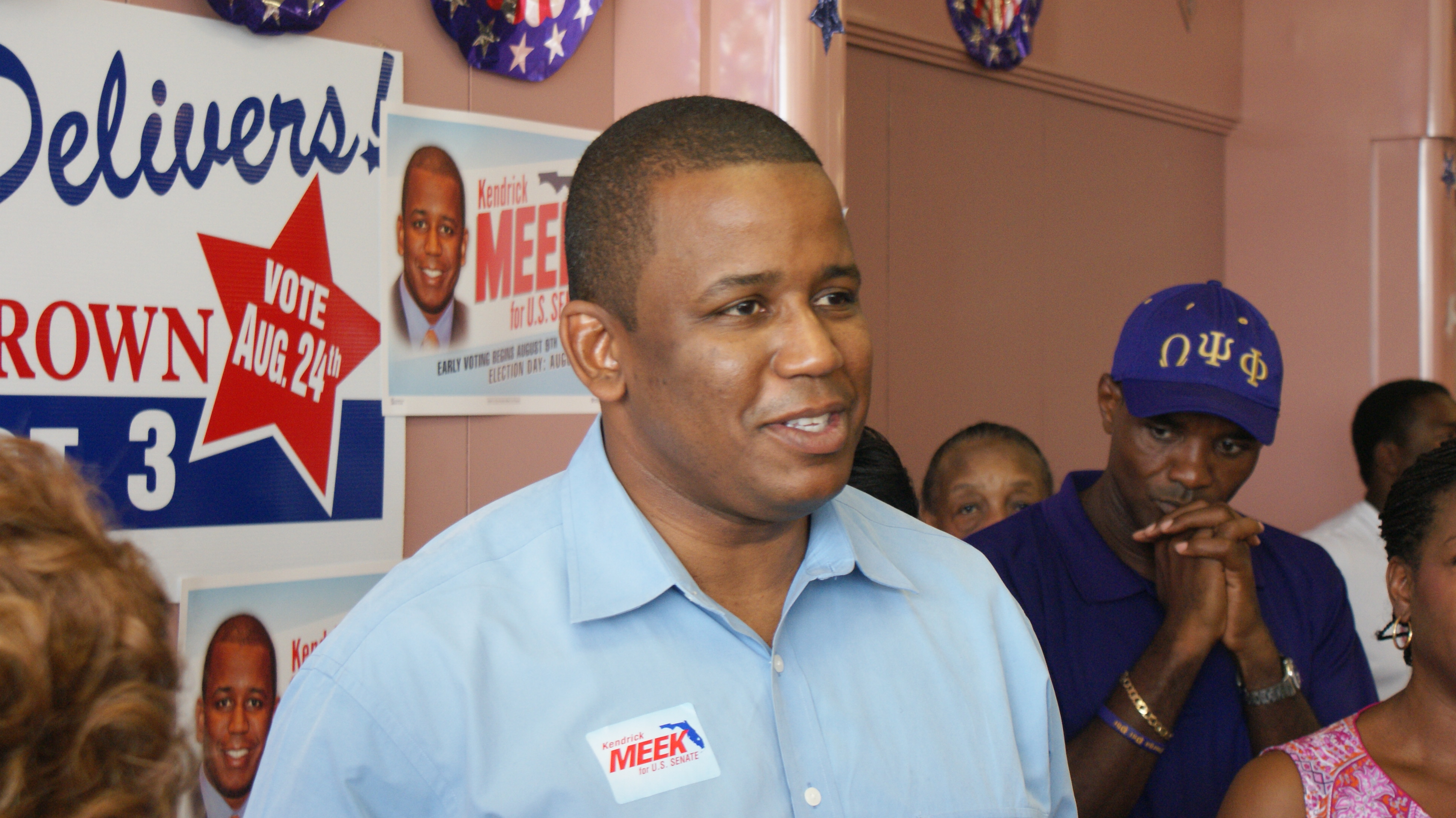
Meek at an event for his U.S. Senate campaign

On January 13, 2009, Meek announced he would run for the seat in the United States Senate that would be vacated upon the retirement of Republican Mel Martínez in 2010, saying, "I want to be a fighter for Florida with a strong voice that won't let the special interests stand in the way of what's right."

On April 2, 2009, Meek announced his intention to qualify for the ballot by petition via collecting 112,476 completed petitions. On April 8, 2010, Meek made history by becoming the first statewide candidate in the history of Florida to qualify for the ballot by petition.

On November 2, 2010, Meek lost in a three-way-race against Governor Charlie Crist, and former Florida House Speaker Marco Rubio, receiving only 20% of the vote.

== Post-congressional career ==
In 2011, Meek was nominated to serve as Special Representative to the United Nations by President Barack Obama. In 2016, Meek joined King & Spalding as a senior advisor, where he provides strategic counsel to a wide range of Fortune 500 companies. Since 2023, Meek has served as an advocate for Natural Allies, an energy policy group. In this role, he advocates for a practical approach to the green energy transition, emphasizing the importance of clean, affordable natural gas to reliably support renewable energy goals.

== Personal life ==
Meek is married to Arshi Siddiqui Meek, CEO of Bellwether Government Affairs and a former, longtime partner at the law firm Akin Gump Strauss & Feld, who also served as senior advisor to Speaker Nancy Pelosi. He has two children, Lauren and Kendrick Jr.

== Electoral history ==
Florida's 17th congressional district: Results 2002–2008
Year	Democrat	Votes	Pct	Republican	Votes	Pct		3rd Party	Party	Votes	Pct
2002	Kendrick B. Meek	113,749	100%	(no candidate)			*				
2004	Kendrick B. Meek	178,690	100%	(no candidate)				Omari Musa	Write-in	734	<1%
2006	Kendrick B. Meek	90,663	100%	(no candidate)			*				
2008	Kendrick B. Meek	Elected	N/A	(no candidate)			**				

*Write-in and minor candidate notes: In 2002, Michael Italie received 73 votes. In 2006, Eric Simpson received 23 votes.
**Under Florida law, a candidate who has no opposition at all in the general election is automatically elected without his or her name being placed on the ballot. In 2008, Meek was automatically elected because he had no general election opponents on the ballot and no write-in candidates filed candidacies against him.

United States Senate election in Florida, 2010
Party	Candidate	Votes	%	±%
Republican	Marco Rubio	2,645,743	48.89%	−0.54%
Independent	Charlie Crist	1,607,549	29.71%	+29.71%
Democratic	Kendrick Meek	1,092,936	20.20%	−28.12%
Libertarian	Alexander Snitker	24,850	0.46%	N/A
Independent	Sue Askeland	15,340	0.28%	N/A
Independent	Rick Tyler	7,394	0.14%	N/A
Constitution	Bernie DeCastro	4,792	0.09%	N/A
Independent	Lewis Jerome Armstrong	4,443	0.08%	N/A
Independent	Bobbie Bean	4,301	0.08%	N/A
Independent	Bruce Riggs	3,647	0.07%	N/A
Write-ins		108	0.00	
Majority		1,038,194	19.19%	
Total votes		5,411,106	100	
Republican hold		Swing		

== See also ==
- "30 Something" Working Group
- Cuba Democracy Caucus
- List of African-American United States representatives
- List of African-American United States Senate candidates

U.S. House of Representatives
Preceded by Carrie Meek	Member of the U.S. House of Representatives from Florida's 17th congressional district 2003–2011	Succeeded by Frederica Wilson
Party political offices
Preceded by Betty Castor	Democratic nominee for U.S. Senator from Florida (Class 3); 2010	Succeeded by Patrick Murphy
U.S. order of precedence (ceremonial)
Preceded by Ginny Brown-Waite as Former U.S. Representative	Order of precedence of the United States as Former U.S. Representative	Succeeded by Connie Mack IV as Former U.S. Representative
