= Shaping Up =

- Also known as: Welcome to the Club
- Genre: Sitcom
- Created by: Ken Estin; Sam Simon
- Written by: Ken Estin; Merrill Markoe; Sam Simon
- Directed by: Michael Lessac
- Starring: Leslie Nielsen; Michael Fontaine; Jennifer Tilly; Shawn Weatherly; Jake Steinfeld
- Composer: Fletcher Adams
- Country of origin: United States
- Original language: English
- No. of seasons: 1
- No. of episodes: 5

Production
- Executive producers: Ken Estin; Sam Simon
- Producer: Richard Sakai
- Running time: 30 minutes
- Production companies: Estin-Simon Productions; Paramount Television

Original release
- Network: ABC
- Release: March 20 – April 17, 1984

Shaping Up is an American sitcom created by writer-producers Sam Simon and Ken Estin, which ran for five weeks on ABC from March 20 until April 17, 1984.

== Synopsis ==
A spring replacement in 1984, Shaping Up, originally titled Welcome to the Club, was given the 9:00 Tuesday slot following Three's Company. Leslie Nielsen played Buddy Fox, curmudgeonly owner of the Buddy Fox Health Club. Michael Fontaine played Ben, the club's manager who was like a son to Buddy and served as the show's voice of sanity. Other cast members included Jennifer Tilly, Shawn Weatherly and Jake Steinfeld of Body by Jake fame.

Five episodes were broadcast before the cancellation, leaving one unaired. The role of Ben was first played by Tim Robbins, whom the network replaced with Fontaine.

== Cast ==
- Leslie Nielsen as Buddy Fox
- Cathie Shirriff as Zoya Antonova
- Michael Fontaine as Ben
- Jennifer Tilly as Shannon Winters
- Shawn Weatherly as Melissa McDonald

== US television ratings ==
| Episodes | Start date | End date | Nielsen rank | Nielsen rating |
|---|---|---|---|---|
| 5 | March 20, 1984 | April 17, 1984 | 53 | 15.0 (Note: Tied with Silver Spoons and Maggie Briggs) |

== Episodes ==
| No. | Title | Directed by | Written by | Original release date |
|---|---|---|---|---|
| 1 | "Baby Be Mine" | Michael Lessac | Sam Simon & Ken Estin | March 20, 1984 |
Buddy Fox's unfulfilled urge for fatherhood leads him to try purchasing a baby from a young pregnant woman in financial problems (Allyce Beasley), who only gives up on the deal after holding her newborn.
| 2 | "Ex Pede Herculem" | Michael Lessac | Sam Simon & Ken Estin | March 27, 1984 |
Ben suggests Buddy to perform a feat of strength as promotion, leading him to try lifting the front of a Volkswagen.
| 3 | "Defusing the Muse" | Michael Lessac | Ken Estin, Sam Simon, Merrill Markoe | April 3, 1984 |
Shannon discovers the latest recruit in the health club is an award-winning playwright.
| 4 | "I Should Have Danced All Night" | Michael Lessac | Ken Estin & Sam Simon | April 10, 1984 |
Melissa goes to her first Hollywood party while Ben and Buddy replace the shower tiles.
| 5 | "Mixed Nuts" | Michael Lessac | Ken Estin & Sam Simon | April 17, 1984 |
Buddy considers his own mortality after the death of a friend.
