= William H. Turner Technical Arts High School =

High school in Florida, United States

Coordinates: 25.86718°N 80.22913°W

Information
- Established: 1993; 33 years ago
- Enrollment: c.1800
- Website: https://www.turnertech-eagles.net/

William H. Turner Technical Arts High School, commonly referred to as Turner Tech, is a secondary technical school located at 10151 NW 19th Avenue in Miami, Florida. Turner Tech is located behind Miami Central High School. According to US news (Best High Schools), William H. Turner Technical Arts High School is ranked #2574 in the National Rankings and earned a silver medal. As of July 21, 2017, Turner Tech's principal is Uwezo Frasier. The school is ranked as a "B" school and is part of the Miami Dade Public Schools magnet program.

== History ==
Turner Tech was founded in 1993 and was named after William H. Turner, former chairperson of the Miami-Dade County School Board and a former member of the Florida State Legislature. Turner, along with Roger C. Cuevas (a former Miami-Dade County Public Schools Superintendent), had a dream to construct a school that would provide academic and technical skills to prepare youth for the 21st century.

Turner Tech operates as a small high school, with approximately 1,800 students.

== Academies ==
Turner Tech is a technical school that teaches students skills for their chosen program. Turner Tech is one of the first high schools to separate each job criteria in different branches.

Students work in groups within each academy. The academies are:

- Academy of Criminal Justice (CJ)
- Academy of Entertainment Technology (AET)
- Academy of Business Finance (ABF)
- Academy of Information Technology (AOIT)
- Academy of Medical Science (AMS)
- Academy of Veterinary Science & Agricultural Technology (VSAT)
- Academy of Instructional Research (AIR)

The academic course is integrated into the career major the student has chosen. Students chose a career academy during their freshman year. By successfully completing a sequence of technical courses, they gain certification(s) in one or more related careers.

All students assemble an active career portfolio, which includes examples of their individual work. Under each academy, students participate in hands-on experiences in actual workplaces and school-based interests.

For each academy there is a different shirt and different color. The corresponding colors are:

- Academy of Entertainment Technology: Black
- Academy of Medical Sciences: Navy Blue
- Academy of Veterinary Science and Agricultural Technology: Forest Green
- Academy of Information Technology and Entrepreneurship: Royal Blue
- Academy of Criminal Justice: Gray
- Academy of Business and Finance: Burgundy

== Demographics ==
The student body makeup is 33% male and 67% female, and the total minority enrollment is 99%. Turner Technical Arts High School is 86% Black, 9% Hispanic, 2% White, and 3% other.

== AET ==
The Academy of Entertainment Technology focuses on television broadcasting and production, and, most importantly, creativity. AET gets footage for films, edits films, makes news broadcasts, and creates a variety of independent movies to submit to competitions. AET is divided into two different sub-categories: Film and Television Production.

AET's Skills USA is where students compete with what they've learned. The students compete with other schools on speed editing, broadcasting, and script making.

AET used to include Diesel Technology, Turner Tech's only automotive program. Although Diesel Technology was the only AET program to win VICA competitions at the time it was cut from the school in the middle of the school year of 2003–2004. This prompted all the "Diesel Boys" to join other programs, which shared little to no relation. Most either stayed in AET or transferred to Agriscience.

== AMS ==
The Academy of Medical Sciences is highly selective and candidates must go through an application and interview process, in an effort to secure one of 25 seats.

The Academy includes 4 programs student are able to be certified in.

== VSAT ==
The Agriscience Academy, or Ag for short, encourages students to play a role in society that deals with agriculture such as livestock and horticulture. In the Animal Science and Services program, students handle livestock such as cattle, in order to better understand the meat industry as well as the veterinary field of large animals. Animals include pigs, sheep, steers and breeding cattle. Students also attend local fairs like the Miami-Dade County Fair and the State Fair in Tampa. In order for this to be possible, the students have to join FFA or Future Farmers of America. FFA allows students to learn leadership skills and parliament procedures. Tractor driving and Speech are also part of the FFA.

The academy also offers a veterinary assisting course, in which students raise poultry, goats, rabbits, and guinea pigs. Unlike the animal science animals, these animals are not sold for market, so the students that buy animals can keep them if they choose after the fair. The students compete every year at the Miami-Dade Fair in showmanship, breed i.d., fitting and grooming, and shows (where the animal may place, or get special awards like best of breed and best in show).

== CJ ==
The Academy of Public Service is divided into two different divisions, Criminal Justice and Teachers Assistants. Both academic programs are joined in yearly competitions against other Florida high schools within the Florida Public Service Association (FPSA). Currently Eric G. Clayton oversees the Criminal Justice Program for the high school students and helps advance their fields in the Criminal Justice program. The Criminal Justice Program offers many opportunities for high school seniors, from internships with the Miami-Dade Correctional Facility to becoming a City of Miami or a City of North Miami Beach police explorer. Many CJ students are enrolled at Miami-Dade College North as dual enrollment students wherein they receive their Associate of Arts in General Studies before they graduate high school. Beginning the fall of school year 2022, the CJ Academy will be offering certification within the state of Florida as a 911 Telecommunicator.

== AOIT ==
The Academy of Information Technology (AOIT) is for students who wish to enter the job field with knowledge of current technology. Students learn basic skills necessary to qualify for entry-level positions in the job market. Eventually, they move to advanced programs such as the Adobe and Microsoft Suite. At the end of their freshman year, the students may choose to pursue a program of study in digital design, entrepreneurship, or web design.

== ACAD ==
The Academy of Civil Engineering and Architectural Design. An upcoming academy that's open for enrollment for incoming freshmen students.
