= Florida's 17th congressional district =

U.S. House district for Florida

Coordinates: 27°19′03″N 81°32′54″W

- Map of district boundaries
- Representative: Greg Steube; R–Sarasota
- Area: 6,315 mi^{2} (16,360 km^{2})
- Distribution: 82.08% urban; 17.92% rural
- Population (2025): 895,267
- Median household income: $80,167
- Ethnicity: 75.5% White; 13.8% Hispanic; 5.2% Black; 3.2% Two or more races; 1.6% Asian; 0.7% other
- Cook PVI: R+10

Florida's 17th congressional district is an electoral district for the U.S. Congress, located in Southwest Florida. In the 2020 redistricting cycle, the district was shrunk to only include the coastal counties of Sarasota and Charlotte as well as northeastern Lee County, including most of Lehigh Acres. Other inland counties which were previously in the district were instead redistricted into the new 18th district.

The 17th district was created as a result of the redistricting cycle after the 1980 census. From 2003 to 2013 it was a majority African American district including the southern parts of Broward County and the eastern parts of Miami-Dade County. Included within the district were Pembroke Pines, Hollywood, Miramar, and North Miami. Most of this district is now the 24th district.

After the 2010 census and its corresponding redistricting cycle, the district included portions of the previous 12th and 16th districts. Most of the district's territory came from the western portion of the old 16th. After court-ordered redistricting for the 2016 elections, the district included a large area of central Florida from eastern Tampa Bay to the western shores of Lake Okeechobee, including all of Charlotte County, DeSoto County, Glades County, Hardee County, Highlands County and Okeechobee County, plus parts of Lee County, Polk County and Sarasota County. Major cities in the district included North Port, Punta Gorda, Venice, Wauchula, Arcadia, and Okeechobee.

As of 2024, the district is the oldest in the United States, with a median age of 55.3.

Republican Tom Rooney, incumbent congressman of the previous 16th district, ran for reelection in the 17th in 2012 and won. He was re-elected in 2014 and 2016, but did not run for re-election in 2018. Greg Steube was elected on November 6.

== Recent election results from statewide races ==
Year	Office	Results
2008	President	McCain 51% - 48%
2010	Senate	Rubio 48% - 12%
2010	Governor	Scott 54% - 46%
2010	Attorney General	Bondi 57% - 35%
2010	Chief Financial Officer	Atwater 60% - 31%
2012	President	Romney 55% - 45%
2012	Senate	Nelson 51% - 49%
2014	Governor	Scott 54% - 46%
2016	President	Trump 56% - 40%
2016	Senate	Rubio 58% - 38%
2018	Senate	Scott 56% - 43%
2018	Governor	DeSantis 56% - 42%
2018	Attorney General	Moody 59% - 39%
2018	Chief Financial Officer	Patronis 59% - 41%
2020	President	Trump 58% - 42%
2022	Senate	Rubio 63% - 36%
2022	Governor	DeSantis 64% - 35%
2022	Attorney General	Moody 66% - 34%
2022	Chief Financial Officer	Patronis 65% - 35%
2024	President	Trump 62% - 38%
2024	Senate	Scott 62% - 37%

== Composition ==
For the 118th and successive Congresses (based on redistricting following the 2020 census), the district contains all or portions of the following counties and communities:

Charlotte County (10)

All 10 communities

Lee County (10)

Alva, Charleston Park, Buckingham, Fort Myers Shores, Lehigh Acres (part; also 19th), North Fort Myers (part; also 19th), Olga, Palmona Park, Suncoast Estates, Tice, Verandah

Sarasota County (31)

All 31 communities

== List of members representing the district ==
Representative	Party	Years	Cong ress	Electoral history	Congressional map
District created January 3, 1983
William Lehman (Biscayne Park)	Democratic	January 3, 1983 – January 3, 1993	98th 99th 100th 101st 102nd	Redistricted from the 13th district and re-elected in 1982. Re-elected in 1984. Re-elected in 1986. Re-elected in 1998. Re-elected in 1990. Retired.	1983–1993 [data missing]
Carrie Meek (Miami)	Democratic	January 3, 1993 – January 3, 2003	103rd 104th 105th 106th 107th	Elected in 1992. Re-elected in 1994. Re-elected in 1996. Re-elected in 1998. Re-elected in 2000. Retired.	1993–2003 [data missing]
Kendrick Meek (Miami)	Democratic	January 3, 2003 – January 3, 2011	108th 109th 110th 111th	Elected in 2002. Re-elected in 2004. Re-elected in 2006. Re-elected in 2008. Retired to run for U.S. senator.	2003–2013
Frederica Wilson (Miami Gardens)	Democratic	January 3, 2011 – January 3, 2013	112th	Elected in 2010. Redistricted to the 24th district.	2003–2013
Tom Rooney (Okeechobee)	Republican	January 3, 2013 – January 3, 2019	113th 114th 115th	Redistricted from the 16th district and re-elected in 2012. Re-elected in 2014. Re-elected in 2016. Retired.	2013–2017
Tom Rooney (Okeechobee)	Republican	January 3, 2013 – January 3, 2019	113th 114th 115th	Redistricted from the 16th district and re-elected in 2012. Re-elected in 2014. Re-elected in 2016. Retired.	2017–2023
Greg Steube (Sarasota)	Republican	January 3, 2019 – present	116th 117th 118th 119th	Elected in 2018. Re-elected in 2020. Re-elected in 2022. Re-elected in 2024. Re-elected in 2026.	2017–2023
Greg Steube (Sarasota)	Republican	January 3, 2019 – present	116th 117th 118th 119th	Elected in 2018. Re-elected in 2020. Re-elected in 2022. Re-elected in 2024. Re-elected in 2026.	2023–2027

== Election results ==
=== 2002 ===
Florida's 17th Congressional District Election (2002)
Party	Candidate	Votes	%
Democratic	Kendrick Meek	113,749	99.94%
No party	Others	73	0.06%
Total votes		113,822	100.00%
Turnout			
Democratic hold			

=== 2004 ===
Florida's 17th Congressional District Election (2004)
Party	Candidate	Votes	%
Democratic	Kendrick Meek (Incumbent)	178,690	99.59%
No party	Others	734	0.41%
Total votes		179,424	100.00%
Turnout			
Democratic hold			

=== 2006 ===
Florida's 17th Congressional District Election (2006)
Party	Candidate	Votes	%
Democratic	Kendrick Meek (Incumbent)	90,663	99.97%
No party	Others	23	0.03%
Total votes		90,686	100.00%
Turnout			
Democratic hold			

=== 2008 ===
Florida's 17th Congressional District Election (2008)
Party	Candidate	Votes	%
Democratic	Kendrick Meek (Incumbent)		100.00%
Total votes			100.00%
Turnout			
Democratic hold			

=== 2010 ===
Florida's 17th Congressional District Election (2010)
Party	Candidate	Votes	%
Democratic	Frederica S. Wilson	106,361	86.21%
Independent	Roderick Vereen	17,009	13.79%
Total votes		123,370	100.00%
Turnout			
Democratic hold			

=== 2012 ===
2012 United States House of Representatives elections in Florida
Party	Candidate	Votes	%
Republican	Tom Rooney (incumbent)	165,488	58.6
Democratic	William Bronson	116,766	41.4
Independent	Tom Baumann (write-in)	12	0.0
Total votes		282,266	100.0
Republican win (new seat)			

=== 2014 ===
2014 United States House of Representatives elections in Florida
Party	Candidate	Votes	%
Republican	Tom Rooney (incumbent)	141,493	63.2
Democratic	Will Bronson	82,263	36.8
Total votes		223,756	100.0
Republican hold			

=== 2016 ===
2016 United States House of Representatives elections in Florida
Party	Candidate	Votes	%
Republican	Tom Rooney (incumbent)	209,348	61.8
Democratic	April Freeman	115,974	34.2
Independent	John W Sawyer III	13,353	4.0
Total votes		338,675	100.0

=== 2018 ===
2018 United States House of Representatives elections in Florida
Party	Candidate	Votes	%
Republican	Greg Steube	193,326	62.3
Democratic	Allen Ellison	117,194	37.7
Total votes		310,520	100.0
Republican hold			

=== 2020 ===
2020 United States House of Representatives elections in Florida
Party	Candidate	Votes	%
Republican	Greg Steube (incumbent)	266,514	64.6%
Democratic	Allen Ellison	140,487	34.1%
Independent	Theodore "Pink Tie" Murray	5,396	1.3%
Total votes		412,397	100.0
Republican hold			

=== 2022 ===
2022 United States House of Representatives elections in Florida
Party	Candidate	Votes	%
Republican	Greg Steube (incumbent)	222,601	63.8%
Democratic	Andrea Kale	123,822	35.5%
Independent	Theodore Murray	2,226	0.64%
Total votes		348,649	100.0
Republican hold			

=== 2024 ===
2024 United States House of Representatives elections in Florida
Party	Candidate	Votes	%
Republican	Greg Steube (incumbent)	291,347	63.90%
Democratic	Manny Lopez	164,566	36.10%
Write-in	Ralph Hartman	8	0.00%
Total votes		455,921	100.0
Republican hold			
