= Jake Steinfeld =

American actor and fitness trainer (born 1958)

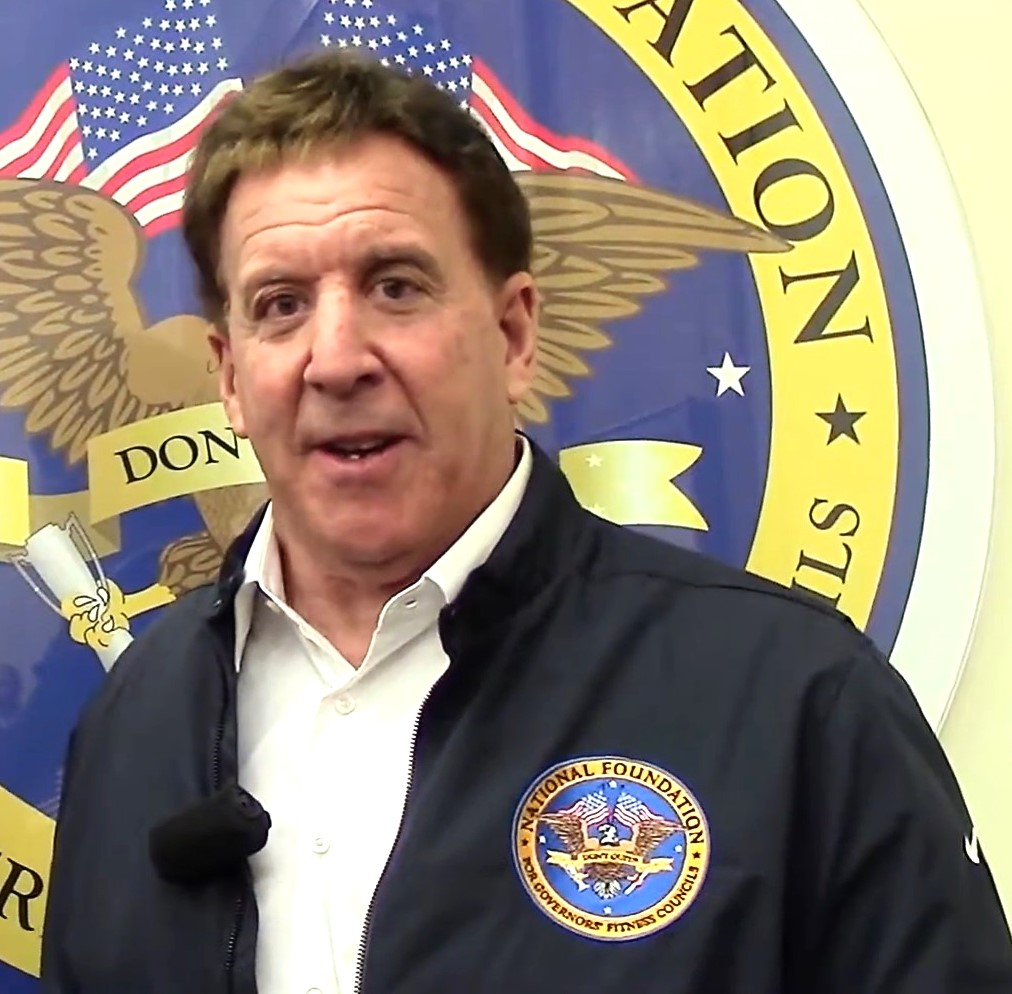
- Steinfeld making an appearance in Holbrook, Arizona, October 2016
- Born: February 21, 1958 (age 68); New York City, New York, U.S.
- Education: State University of New York, Cortland (attended)
- Occupations: Actor; fitness personality; entrepreneur; producer
- Years active: 1979–present
- Spouse: Tracy Steinfeld
- Children: 4
- Relatives: Hailee Steinfeld (niece) Josh Allen (Hailee’s husband)

Jake Steinfeld (born February 21, 1958) is an American actor, fitness personality, and entrepreneur, known for his brand, Body by Jake.

== Early life ==
Born in the Sea Gate neighborhood of Brooklyn in western Coney Island, New York, Steinfeld grew up in Baldwin, New York. He attended the State University of New York at Cortland, dropped out, and moved to Los Angeles.

== Career ==
Steinfeld develops brands and businesses as chairman and CEO of Body by Jake. Before that, Steinfeld created FitTV, a 24-hour fitness lifestyle network, which he later sold to News Corp.

After the sale of FitTV, Steinfeld launched ExerciseTV, a fitness on-demand television network, with partners Comcast, New Balance, and Time Warner. He co-founded Major League Lacrosse (MLL), the first professional outdoor lacrosse league in 2001. MLL had six franchises in North America; the championship trophy was named the Steinfeld Cup. In 2020, the MLL merged with the Premier Lacrosse League. He is the founder of the World Series of Youth Lacrosse which provides (U13) youth players a lacrosse experience like that of a professional. The event features teams from the U.S., Europe, Canada, Israel, the Iroquois Nation, among others competing to play in the championship game aired live on ESPN2 on the Fourth of July. Teaming with Universal Music Enterprises (UMe), a division of Universal Music Group, Steinfeld formed a music label called Body by Jake Music.

Steinfeld became chairman of the California Governor's Council on Physical Fitness and Sports under Governor Arnold Schwarzenegger in 2006 and served until 2011 under Governor Jerry Brown. He was named chairman of the National Foundation for Governors' Fitness Councils in 2012. Through the cooperation of public and private partnerships, the NFGFC rewards "Don't Quit" fitness centers to elementary and middle schools who show innovative ways to promote fitness and nutrition in their schools and communities across the United States. Steinfeld was an official Olympic torch bearer for the 2012 Summer Olympics. He served as the honorary mayor of Pacific Palisades, a neighborhood in Los Angeles, from 2013 to 2016.

=== Television and film ===
Steinfeld began as a personal trainer with clients including Steven Spielberg and Harrison Ford, whom he trained for Indiana Jones and the Temple of Doom and Indiana Jones and the Last Crusade. Later Steinfeld starred on a sitcom on the Family Channel called Big Brother Jake.

Other television credits include King of the Hill, Movin' Mountains, Dream On, The Tracey Ullman Show, Shaping Up, and Simon & Simon. In addition, he appeared in the fourteenth season of Hell's Kitchen as a guest in episode 12's dinner service. His film debut was in Americathon, a 1979 film. He acted in the lead role of the killer in the early slasher film Home Sweet Home (1981). Other film roles include Cheech and Chong's Next Movie (1980), Into the Night (1985), The Money Pit (1986), and Coming to America (1988). Steinfeld supplied the voice of Git, a lab rat in the Disney animated feature Ratatouille and was the voice of the Fish Seller in the 2011 English version of From Up On Poppy Hill.

Steinfeld is executive producer of The Grizzlies, a Canadian film which won the DGC award for Best Director in Feature Film as well as Audience Awards in the Calgary, Minneapolis, and Palm Springs Film Festivals.

=== Writing ===
Steinfeld is a New York Times and Wall Street Journal best-selling author. He has written and co-authored books including Body by Jake (1984); Don't Quit; Get Strong! Body by Jake's Guide to Building Confidence, Muscles and a Great Future for Teenage Guys (2002); I've Seen a Lot of Famous People Naked and They've Got Nothing on You! (2005); and Take A Shot!, A Remarkable Story of Perseverance, Friendship, and a Really Crazy Adventure (2012).

== Personal life ==
Steinfeld is married; he and his wife, Tracy, have four children. He is the uncle of actress/singer Hailee Steinfeld, wife of Buffalo Bills quarterback Josh Allen.

== Filmography ==
=== Film ===
Year	Title	Role	Notes
1979	Americathon	Act	
1980	Cheech and Chong's Next Movie	Womba	
1981	Home Sweet Home	Jay Jones	
1982	Movie Madness	Bodyguard	
1985	Into the Night	Larry	
1986	The Money Pit	Duke	
1986	Odd Jobs	Mick	
1986	Tough Guys	Howard	
1988	You Can't Hurry Love	Sparky	
1988	Coming to America	Cab Driver	
1990	Repossessed	Self	
1991	Rock-a-Doodle	Farmyard Bully / Max the Bouncer	Voice
1998	Susan's Plan	Self	
1999	Aimée & Jaguar	Eberhard	
2007	Ratatouille	Git (Lab Rat)	Voice
2011	From Up on Poppy Hill	Fish Seller	Voice

=== Television ===
Year	Title	Role	Notes
1982	Simon & Simon	Bernard	Episode: "Art for Arthur's Sake"
1983	The Invisible Woman	Attendant	Television film
1984	Shaping Up	Jery	2 episodes
1984	Mr. Success	Officer Winston Simon	Television film
1985	Amazing Stories	The Hulk	Episode: "Remote Control Man"
1986	All Is Forgiven	Bouncer	Episode: "Mother's Day"
1989	The Tracey Ullman Show	Fitness Trainer / Conductor	2 episodes
1990–1994	Big Brother Jake	Jake Rozzner	81 episodes
1994	Dream On	Mack	Episode: "Martin Tupper in 'Magnum Farce'"
1995	Burke's Law	Burt Douglas	Episode: "Who Killed the Hollywood Headshrinker?"
2000	The Wonderful World of Disney	Self	Episode: "Model Behavior"
2008	King of the Hill	Thunder	Episode: "Dia-BILL-ic Shock"
2016, 2017	Lopez	Jake / Jake Steinfeld	2 episodes

Preceded by Sugar Ray Leonard	Honorary Mayor of Pacific Palisades; 2013–present	Incumbent
