= Judith Anne Smith =

American judge (born 1963)

Judith Smith

Senior Judge of the Superior Court of the District of Columbia
- Incumbent
- Assumed office 2022

Associate Judge of the Superior Court of the District of Columbia
- In office October 17, 2010 – January 14, 2022
- President: Barack Obama
- Preceded by: Geoffrey M. Alprin
- Succeeded by: Leslie Meek

Magistrate Judge of the Superior Court of the District of Columbia
- In office September 15, 2008 – October 17, 2010

Personal details
- Born: October 2, 1963 (age 61); Columbus, Ohio, U.S.
- Education: Pennsylvania State University (BA); Georgetown University (JD)

Judith Anne Smith (born October 2, 1963) is a senior judge of the Superior Court of the District of Columbia and former magistrate judge of the same court.

== Education and career ==
Smith earned her Bachelor of Arts from Pennsylvania State University in 1985, and her Juris Doctor from Georgetown University Law Center in 1992. While attending law school, she interned at the Legal Aid Society of the District of Columbia, National Criminal Justice Association and at the Public Defender Service for the District of Columbia.

After graduating, she clerked for Judge A. Franklin Burgess of the D.C. Superior Court. In 1993, Smith opened a law practice. From 1994 to 2001 she returned to the Public Defender Service as a staff attorney and later as a special education attorney. In 2001, she went to work in the Office of Special Education of the District of Columbia Public Schools as an executive director.

=== D.C. Superior Court ===
On September 15, 2008, Chief Judge Rufus G. King III, of the Superior Court of the District of Columbia, appointed Smith as a magistrate judge of the court.

President Barack Obama nominated Smith on March 25, 2010, to a 15-year term as an associate judge on the Superior Court of the District of Columbia to the seat vacated by Geoffrey M. Alprin. On April 20, 2010, the Senate Committee on Homeland Security and Governmental Affairs held a hearing on her nomination. On April 28, 2010, the Committee reported her nomination favorably to the senate floor. On June 22, 2010, the full Senate confirmed her nomination by voice vote. She retired on January 14, 2022. Starting in February 2022, she was evaluated for an appointment as a senior judge and assumed office later that year.
