= Judy Seriale Smith =

American state legislator

Judy Seriale Smith is an American former state legislator in Arkansas. She served in the Arkansas House of Representatives. She served four terms in the 1990s. She represented District 37. She is Baptist. She is African American.
