= Palmona Park, Florida =

- Census-designated place
- Location in Lee County and the state of Florida
- Coordinates: 26°41′21″N 81°53′40″W
- Country: United States
- State: Florida
- County: Lee

Area
  - Total: 0.83 sq mi (2.14 km^{2})
  - Land: 0.82 sq mi (2.13 km^{2})
  - Water: 0.0039 sq mi (0.01 km^{2})
- Elevation: 13 ft (4.0 m)

Population (2020)
  - Total: 1,240
  - Density: 1,507.0/sq mi (581.84/km^{2})
- Time zone: UTC-5 (Eastern (EST))
  - Summer (DST): UTC-4 (EDT)
- ZIP code: 33903
- Area code: 239
- FIPS code: 12-54357
- GNIS feature ID: 2403394

Palmona Park is a census-designated place (CDP) in Lee County, Florida, United States. The population was 1,240 at the 2020 census, up from 1,146 at the 2010 census. It is part of the Cape Coral-Fort Myers, Florida Metropolitan Statistical Area.

== Geography ==
Palmona Park is located in northern Lee County. It is surrounded by the North Fort Myers CDP. The southwest corner of Palmona Park is at the intersection of U.S. Route 41 (Cleveland Avenue) and Florida State Road 78 (Pine Island Road). SR 78 forms the southern border of the CDP, US 41 forms the western border, Littleton Road is the northern border, and US 41 Business (North Tamiami Trail) forms most of the eastern border.

According to the United States Census Bureau, the CDP has a total area of 0.85 square miles (2.2 km^{2}), of which 2.59 acres (10,468 m^{2}), or 0.48%, are water.

== Demographics ==
Historical population
Census	Pop.	Note	%±
2000	1,353		—
2010	1,146		−15.3%
2020	1,240		8.2%
U.S. Decennial Census

=== 2020 census ===
As of the 2020 census, Palmona Park had a population of 1,240. The median age was 39.7 years. 22.9% of residents were under the age of 18 and 14.0% of residents were 65 years of age or older. For every 100 females there were 108.8 males, and for every 100 females age 18 and over there were 107.8 males age 18 and over.

100.0% of residents lived in urban areas, while 0.0% lived in rural areas.

There were 502 households in Palmona Park, of which 26.9% had children under the age of 18 living in them. Of all households, 27.3% were married-couple households, 30.1% were households with a male householder and no spouse or partner present, and 28.5% were households with a female householder and no spouse or partner present. About 31.9% of all households were made up of individuals and 10.8% had someone living alone who was 65 years of age or older.

There were 596 housing units, of which 15.8% were vacant. The homeowner vacancy rate was 1.3% and the rental vacancy rate was 10.7%.

Racial composition as of the 2020 census
Race	Number	Percent
White	890	71.8%
Black or African American	19	1.5%
American Indian and Alaska Native	20	1.6%
Asian	5	0.4%
Native Hawaiian and Other Pacific Islander	1	0.1%
Some other race	80	6.5%
Two or more races	225	18.1%
Hispanic or Latino (of any race)	347	28.0%

=== 2000 census ===
As of the 2000 census, there were 1,353 people, 541 households, and 326 families residing in the CDP. The population density was 1,630.9 inhabitants per square mile (629.7/km^{2}). There were 639 housing units at an average density of 770.3 per square mile (297.4/km^{2}). The racial makeup of the CDP was 94.90% White, 0.15% African American, 1.03% Native American, 0.74% Asian, 1.55% from other races, and 1.63% from two or more races. Hispanic or Latino of any race were 11.68% of the population.

There were 541 households, out of which 31.4% had children under the age of 18 living with them, 34.8% were married couples living together, 15.0% had a female householder with no husband present, and 39.6% were non-families. 30.3% of all households were made up of individuals, and 9.6% had someone living alone who was 65 years of age or older. The average household size was 2.50 and the average family size was 3.04.

In the CDP, the population was spread out, with 26.6% under the age of 18, 10.3% from 18 to 24, 30.3% from 25 to 44, 21.1% from 45 to 64, and 11.6% who were 65 years of age or older. The median age was 34 years. For every 100 females, there were 111.4 males. For every 100 females age 18 and over, there were 114.5 males.

The median income for a household in the CDP was $22,617, and the median income for a family was $24,010. Males had a median income of $29,000 versus $16,979 for females. The per capita income for the CDP was $14,119. About 15.2% of families and 21.1% of the population were below the poverty line, including 27.1% of those under age 18 and 5.4% of those age 65 or over.
