= Debbie Wasserman Schultz =

American politician (born 1966)

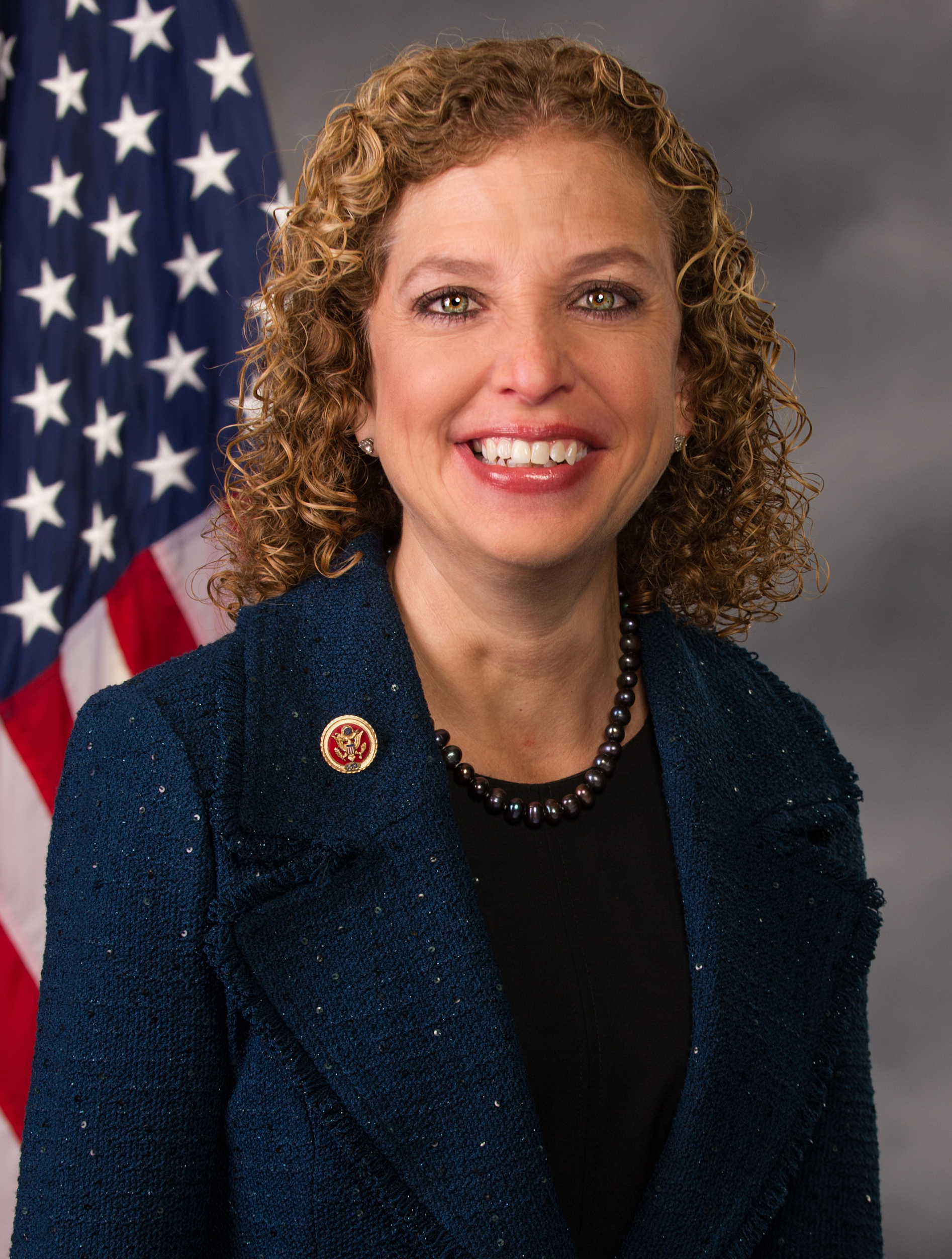
- Official portrait, 2013

Chair of the House Democratic Steering Committee
- Incumbent
- Assumed office January 3, 2023
- Leader: Hakeem Jeffries
- Preceded by: Cheri Bustos; Eric Swalwell; Barbara Lee

Chair of the Democratic National Committee
- In office May 4, 2011 – July 28, 2016
- Preceded by: Donna Brazile (acting)
- Succeeded by: Donna Brazile (acting)

Member of the U.S. House of Representatives from Florida
- Incumbent
- Assumed office January 3, 2005
- Preceded by: Peter Deutsch
- Constituency: 20th district (2005–2013); 23rd district (2013–2023); 25th district (2023–present)

Member of the Florida Senate
- In office November 7, 2000 – November 2, 2004
- Preceded by: Howard Forman
- Succeeded by: Nan Rich
- Constituency: 32nd district (2000–2002); 34th district (2002–2004)

Member of the Florida House of Representatives from the 97th district
- In office November 3, 1992 – November 7, 2000
- Preceded by: Redistricted
- Succeeded by: Nan Rich

Personal details
- Born: Deborah Wasserman; September 27, 1966 (age 60) New York City, New York, U.S.
- Party: Democratic
- Spouse: Steve Schultz (m. 1991)
- Children: 3
- Education: University of Florida (BA, MA)
- Website: House website Campaign website
- Wasserman Schultz's voice Wasserman Schultz on Breast Cancer Awareness Month; Recorded October 30, 2013

Deborah Wasserman Schultz (née Wasserman; /ˈwɑːsərmən/; born September 27, 1966) is an American politician serving as the U.S. representative for Florida's 25th congressional district, first elected to Congress in 2004. A member of the Democratic Party, she was the chair of the Democratic National Committee (DNC) from 2011 until her resignation in 2016.

Wasserman Schultz served in the Florida House of Representatives and the Florida Senate and was a national co-chair of Hillary Clinton's 2008 campaign for president. Her district currently (prior to the 2026 redistricting) covers much of southern Broward County, including a large part of Fort Lauderdale.

Wasserman Schultz was elected chair of the Democratic National Committee in May 2011, replacing Tim Kaine. On July 28, 2016, she resigned from that position after WikiLeaks released leaked emails showing that she and other members of the DNC staff had expressed bias in preference of Hillary Clinton over Bernie Sanders in the 2016 Democratic primaries. The emails showed that some DNC officials had discussed strategies to weaken Sanders' campaign, questioning his viability, and suggesting ways to discredit his supporters. She secured a senior surrogate spot on the Clinton campaign afterwards.

== Early life and education ==
Born in Forest Hills, Queens, New York, to a Jewish family, Wasserman Schultz is the daughter of Ann and Larry Wasserman. Her father is a certified public accountant, and her brother, Steven Wasserman, is an assistant United States attorney for the District of Columbia.

From 1968 to 1978, the family lived in Lido Beach on Long Island. In 1978, her family moved to Melville, also on Long Island, where she graduated from Half Hollow Hills High School East in 1984. She received a Bachelor of Arts in 1988 and a Master of Arts with a certificate in political campaigning in 1990, both in political science, from the University of Florida.

At the University of Florida, Wasserman Schultz was active in student government, serving as president of the Student Senate and the founder and president of the Rawlings Area Council Government. She was also a member of the Omicron Delta Kappa honor society, the James C. Grimm chapter of the National Residence Hall Honorary, and the union Graduate Assistants United. She served as president of the Graduate Student Council and vice president of the UF College Democrats. She has credited her experience in student politics with developing her "love for politics and the political process."

== Florida state legislature (1992–2004) ==
=== Florida State House of Representatives ===
In 1988, Wasserman Schultz became an aide to Peter Deutsch at the beginning of his state legislative career. In 1992, Deutsch successfully ran for United States Representative of Florida's 20th congressional district, and suggested to Wasserman Schultz that she run for his vacated seat in the Florida House of Representatives. Wasserman Schultz won 53% of the vote in a six-way Democratic primary, avoiding a runoff, and won the general election. At 26, she became the youngest female legislator in the state's history.

She served four terms in the Florida State House of Representatives, for eight years, leaving due to state term limits. She became an adjunct instructor of political science at Broward Community College, as well as a public policy curriculum specialist at Nova Southeastern University.

=== Florida State Senate ===
Wasserman Schultz was elected to the Florida State Senate in 2000. She supported several bills, including the Florida Residential Swimming Pool Safety Act and one creating a Children's Services Council for Broward County. She received an award from the Save the Manatee Club for her commitment as a state senator in the 2002 legislative session to manatee protection.

Wasserman Schultz was also voted to be an at-large Florida delegate to the 2004 Democratic National Convention.

== U.S. House of Representatives (2005–present) ==
=== 2004 congressional election ===
In 2004, Wasserman Schultz's mentor Peter Deutsch resigned his congressional seat to make an unsuccessful run for the Senate seat of fellow Democrat Bob Graham. Wasserman Schultz was unopposed in the Democratic primary election held to fill Deutsch's seat. Her Republican opponent was Margaret Hostetter, a realtor who had never held public office. The 20th is so heavily Democratic that Hostetter faced nearly impossible odds in November, but she gained notoriety for her attacks on Wasserman Schultz. For example, Hostetter's campaign site criticized Wasserman Schultz for protesting an American flag photograph with a Christian cross on it that was on display in the workstation of a secretary in a government building. Hostetter wrote, "Elect Margaret Hostetter to Congress November 2 and send the clear message that Americans respect and support... the foundational role Christianity has had in the formation of our great nation. Our rights come from God, not the state."

Wasserman Schultz won with 70.2% of the vote to Hostetter's 29.8%.

=== 2006 congressional election ===
Wasserman Schultz was unopposed for reelection in 2006.

=== 2008 congressional election ===
In 2008 Wasserman Schultz defeated Independent Margaret Hostetter and Socialist write-in candidate Marc Luzietti.

She supported Hillary Clinton for her party's 2008 presidential nomination, and in June 2007 was named one of Clinton's national campaign co-chairs. Once Senator Barack Obama became the presumptive Democratic nominee, she endorsed him and joined Senator Ken Salazar and Representative Artur Davis to second his nomination at the 2008 Democratic National Convention.

On CBS's Face the Nation, she called Sarah Palin unready for the vice presidency. "She knows nothing...Quite honestly, the interview I saw and that Americans saw on Thursday and Friday was similar to when I didn't read a book in high school and had to read the CliffsNotes and phone in my report", Wasserman Schultz said of Palin's interview with ABC's Charlie Gibson the previous week. "She's Cliff-noted her performance so far." Wasserman Schultz was also named a co-chair of the Democratic Party's Red to Blue congressional campaign group. Controversy arose in March 2008 when she felt unable to campaign against South Florida Republican representatives Ileana Ros-Lehtinen, Mario Díaz-Balart, and the now-retired Lincoln Díaz-Balart because of her good friendship with them. Wasserman Schultz and Ros-Lehtinen are both on the LGBT Equality Caucus of which Wasserman Schultz was a vice chair. Ros-Lehtinen has been the sole Republican on the 112-member caucus since 2013.

=== 2010 congressional election ===
Wasserman Schultz defeated Republican nominee Karen Harrington, Independents Stanley Blumenthal and Bob Kunst, and Florida Whig Party candidate Clayton Schock with 60.1% of the vote.

=== 2012 congressional election ===
After the 2010 census, Wasserman Schultz's district was renumbered the 23rd and pushed further into Miami-Dade County, taking in most of Miami Beach and a portion of Miami itself. Harrington ran again. Wasserman Schultz won with 63.2% of the vote to Harrington's 35.6%. When she was sworn in, she became the first white Democrat to represent a significant portion of Miami since 1993.

=== 2014 congressional election ===
In the general election, Wasserman Schultz defeated Republican Joe Kaufman, 62.7% to 37.3%.

=== 2016 congressional election ===
After a court-ordered redistricting in 2015, Wasserman Schultz lost much of her share of Miami-Dade County, including her portions of Miami and Miami Beach.

Economist and law professor Tim Canova challenged Wasserman Schultz in the August 30, 2016, Democratic primary. He was endorsed by Senator Bernie Sanders. Wasserman Schultz won the primary with 57% of the vote.

On August 8, 2016, in the wake of the WikiLeaks Democratic National Committee email disclosures, Canova filed a Federal Election Commission (FEC) violations of regulations complaint against Wasserman Schultz, alleging "interference" with his campaign, contending that on her behalf "the DNC paid a team of national, senior communications and political professionals significant sums of money for their consulting services and the Wasserman Schultz for Congress Campaign utilized these services free of charge." A spokesman for Wasserman Schultz said that the complaint was without merit and that it was "based on stolen, cherry-picked information".

In the general election, Wasserman Schultz defeated Republican nominee Joe Kaufman with 56.7% of the vote.

=== 2018 congressional election ===
Wasserman Schultz ran unopposed in the Democratic primary and was challenged by Kaufman and Independent candidates Tim Canova and Don Endriss. She won the general election with 58.48% of the vote.

=== 2020 congressional election ===
Wasserman Schultz was challenged by Florida attorney Jen Perelman in the August 2020 Democratic primary.

On August 16, 2020, Martina Velasquez, a 16-year-old volunteer for Perelman's campaign, filed a police report alleging that Wasserman Schultz had shoved her more than once when both were talking to voters. Velasquez declined to press charges but asked for a public apology. In the August 18 primary Perelman won 28% of the vote to Wasserman Schultz's 72%.

=== 2022 congressional election ===
Wasserman Schultz handily defeated Robert Millwee in the August Democratic primary and won the general election, defeating Republican Carla Spalding with over 55% of the vote.

=== 2024 congressional election ===
Wasserman Schultz handily defeated Jen Perelman in the August Democratic primary and won the general election, defeating Republican Chris Eddy with nearly 55% of the vote.

=== 2026 congressional election ===
Wasserman Schultz campaigning with the Dolphin Democrats during early voting in Wilton Manors, October 2026.

Rather than seeking reelection in the 25th district, Wasserman Schultz announced on May 22 that she would instead run in Florida's 20th congressional district, which had become vacant following the resignation of Democratic congresswoman Sheila Cherfilus-McCormick in April 2026. Wasserman Schultz won the Democratic nomination with 45.3% in a competitive primary.

=== Tenure ===
==== Committee assignments ====
For the 119th Congress:

- Committee on Appropriations
  - Subcommittee on Agriculture, Rural Development, Food and Drug Administration, and Related Agencies
  - Subcommittee on Energy and Water Development and Related Agencies
  - Subcommittee on Military Construction, Veterans Affairs, and Related Agencies (Ranking Member)

==== Caucus memberships ====
- Black Maternal Health Caucus
- Congressional Solar Caucus
- New Democrat Coalition
- Congressional Arts Caucus
- Afterschool Caucus
- United States Congressional International Conservation Caucus
- Rare Disease Caucus
- Congressional Ukraine Caucus
- Congressional Taiwan Caucus

==== Party leadership ====
- Chief Deputy Whip

Wasserman Schultz was appointed to the Democratic Steering and Policy Committee in her first term. During the 2006 election cycle, she raised over $17 million in campaign contributions for her Democratic colleagues (third-most after Nancy Pelosi and Rahm Emanuel), was chosen as Chief Deputy Whip, and was appointed to the Appropriations Committee, a plum assignment for a sophomore representative.

Wasserman Schultz chairs the committee's Subcommittee on Military Construction, Veterans Affairs, and Related Agencies. Shortly after joining the Appropriations Committee, she received a waiver necessary to sit on an additional committee (Appropriations is typically an exclusive committee), and she is also a member of the Committee on Oversight and Reform. Aside from her committee and leadership roles, she was a member of Nancy Pelosi's "30 Something" Working Group, which consists of congressional Democrats mostly under age 40. The group concentrates on issues affecting young people, including Social Security. She joined the bipartisan Congressional Cuba Democracy Caucus. According to the Congress.org 2008 Power Rankings, she was the 24th-most powerful member of the House, the 22nd-most powerful Democratic representative, and the most powerful Florida representative.

In December 2019, Wasserman Schultz voted to impeach President Donald Trump.

==== Chair of the Democratic National Committee ====
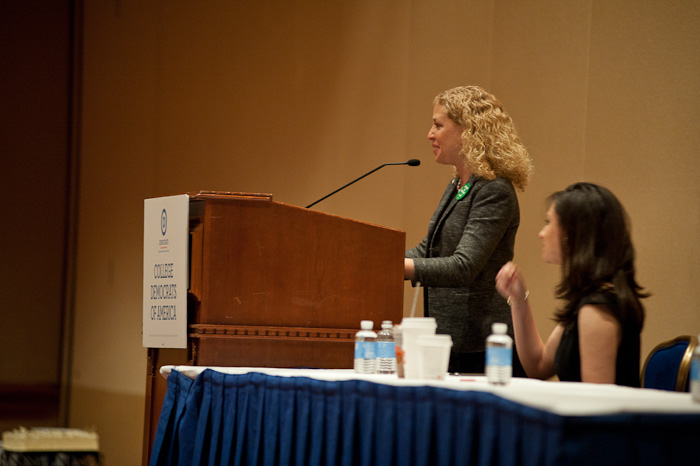
Chair Wasserman Schultz speaking to the College Democrats of America

On April 5, 2011, President Barack Obama chose Wasserman Schultz to succeed Tim Kaine as the 52nd chair of the Democratic National Committee. Donna Brazile served as interim DNC chair until Wasserman Schultz was confirmed at a May 4 DNC meeting in Washington, D.C.

During an appearance on Face the Nation, Wasserman Schultz said, "The Republicans have a plan to end Medicare as we know it. What they would do is they would take the people who are younger than 55 years old today and tell them, 'You know what? You're on your own. Go and find private health insurance in the health-care insurance market.'" Four nonpartisan fact-checkers called her claim false. She then came under criticism for saying on Washington Watch with Roland Martin, "You have the Republicans, who want to literally drag us all the way back to Jim Crow laws and literally—and very transparently—block access to the polls to voters who are more likely to vote for Democratic candidates than Republican candidates". The next day, she said that "Jim Crow was the wrong analogy to use".

In 2012, many of President Obama's advisers questioned the move to select Wasserman Schultz as DNC chair, feeling she came across as too partisan on television. An internal focus study of the popularity of top Obama campaign surrogates ranked Wasserman Schultz at the bottom. She was ultimately reelected as Chair on January 22, 2013. In February 2015, Politico, citing unnamed sources, reported that Wasserman Schultz had lined up supporters in 2013 to portray any decision by Obama to replace her as DNC chair as "anti-woman and anti-Semitic".

In 2011, she missed 62 votes in the House, placing her 45th of 535 in missing Congressional votes.

===== 2016 presidential election =====
Hillary Clinton's opponents Martin O'Malley and Bernie Sanders both criticized Wasserman Schultz's decision to schedule only six debates in the 2016 presidential primary, fewer than in previous election cycles, as well as the timing of the debates.

Ultimately, there were nine debates that both Clinton and Sanders participated in during the primaries, as well as a number of town halls.

Some of Wasserman Schultz's actions that the news covered during the primaries were reducing the debate schedule; uninviting former DNC vice chair Tulsi Gabbard to the first primary debate; halting the Sanders campaign's access to DNC databases after a staffer from his campaign attempted to exploit a security breach; defending the superdelegate system used in the Democratic primaries; rescinding a prior ban on corporate donations; and accusing Sanders supporters of violence at the Nevada Convention.

===== Email leak and resignation =====
After WikiLeaks published DNC emails that showed that some DNC staffers had expressed strong preferences for Clinton over Sanders in the primary, Wasserman Schultz tendered her resignation as head of the DNC, to become effective as of the close of the nominating convention in Philadelphia. According to reports in The Washington Post, Wasserman Schultz strongly resisted suggestions she resign until a phone call from President Obama persuaded her.

After a speech at the convention before the Florida delegation during which Wasserman Schultz was "booed off the stage" by Sanders supporters, the DNC decided that she would not open the convention.

==== 2017 House IT staff accused ====
In February 2017 Politico and BuzzFeed reported Capitol Police accused five IT staffers (who worked for more than 30 House Democrats including Wasserman Schultz) of trying to steal House computer equipment and violating House security policies.

As of February 6, 2017, Politico noted that Wasserman Schultz was one of several House members who did not terminate the suspected staffers after the criminal complaints. In July 2017, one of the accused staffers, Imran Awan, was arrested for making a false statement on a bank loan application. After his arrest, Wasserman Schultz's office fired Awan. Wasserman Schultz later defended her decision not to fire Awan earlier, saying, "I believe that I did the right thing, and I would do it again."

In 2018, The Washington Post reported:

Federal prosecutors concluded an 18-month investigation into a former congressional technology staffer on Tuesday by publicly debunking allegations — promoted by conservative media and President Trump — suggesting he was a Pakistani operative who stole government secrets with cover from House Democrats. As part of an agreement with prosecutors, Imran Awan pleaded guilty to a relatively minor offense unrelated to his work on Capitol Hill: making a false statement on a bank loan application. U.S. prosecutors said they would not recommend jail time.

According to The New York Times:

In the plea agreement, federal prosecutors debunked conspiracy theories about the case that had circulated online. They said that the government had interviewed about 40 witnesses, examined the House Democratic Caucus server and other data and devices, reviewed electronic communications and interviewed Mr. Awan on numerous occasions. They found no evidence that Mr. Awan had engaged in illegal conduct involving House computer systems.

==== October 2018 mail bomb attempt ====
On October 24, 2018, a pipe bomb device sent to former U.S. Attorney General Eric Holder, which had the wrong address, was instead delivered to the Florida office of Wasserman Schultz, whose name and address were on the return labels of all the packages. During this time, similar pipe bomb devices had been sent to various influential Democratic politicians. The packages containing the devices, as well as envelopes containing mysterious white powder, were also labeled to Schultz's office in Sunrise, Florida, as the sender, but the person who sent these devices and envelopes misspelled her name as "Shultz." The same day, a similar device was found at Wasserman Schultz's office in Aventura, Florida, as well. Fingerprint DNA helped identify the suspect as Florida resident and right-wing conspiracist Cesar Sayoc, who was arrested in a parking lot, in Plantation, Florida, on October 26, 2018.

== Political positions ==
Wasserman Schultz is a proponent of gun control legislation and supporter of LGBT rights.

She initiated the 2007 Virginia Graeme Baker Pool and Spa Safety Act to address the safety risks posed by suction entrapment.

In 2011, Wasserman Schultz was one of the 23 co-sponsors of H.R. 3261, the Stop Online Piracy Act (SOPA).

On April 25, 2018, 57 Representatives, including Wasserman Schultz, condemned history-related legislation in Ukraine and Poland. They criticized Poland's new Holocaust law, which they claimed would criminalize accusing Poles of complicity in the Holocaust, as well as Ukraine's 2015 memory laws for glorifying the Ukrainian Insurgent Army (UPA) and its pro-Nazi leaders, such as Roman Shukhevych.

During the 117th Congress, Wasserman Schultz voted with President Joe Biden's stated position 100% of the time according to a FiveThirtyEight analysis.

=== Consumer Finance Protection Bureau and payday lending ===
In December 2015, Wasserman Schultz was one of 24 co-sponsors of H.R. 4018, authored by Representative Dennis A. Ross, which would delay the implementation of CFPB regulations. She was among a dozen Florida representatives who cosponsored the legislation that would delay the CFPB's payday lending rules by two years and void a "deferred presentment transaction" in states with laws similar to Florida's. She has drawn criticism for trying to delay those regulations.

=== Terri Schiavo case ===
The Terri Schiavo case concerned the fate of a woman in Florida who, in 1990, at age 26, suffered brain damage after a heart attack, and was subsequently in a coma and on life support. Both her husband and her medical team wanted to remove her feeding tube, as she was in an irreversible "persistent vegetative state" with no hope of improvement. Her parents opposed this decision for years, appealing to courts, Congress, and ultimately to President George W. Bush to intervene. Wasserman Schultz was one of the strongest opponents of congressional intervention, supporting the husband's view. The feeding tube was eventually removed on 18 March 2005, resulting in Schiavo's death on 31 March.

Wasserman Schultz publicly accused Bush of hypocrisy for having signed a 1999 bill as governor of Texas that allows health care workers to remove life support for terminally ill patients if the patient or family is unable to pay the medical bills.

=== Israeli–Palestinian conflict ===
Wasserman Schultz is a supporter of Israel.

Her predecessor and mentor Peter Deutsch was "among the most hawkish congressional Democrats on Middle East issues". Wasserman Schultz, who took over his seat for Florida's 20th district, "a heavily Jewish swath of Broward County", in 2005 was described by The Forward as "taking a more centrist approach". In 2005 she spoke in approval of President Bush's proposals to give financial aid to the Palestinian Authority in both the proposed supplemental and in the 2006 budgets, on the condition of a "true commitment to a cessation of violence against Israel, financial transparency, and continued support of the dialogue of peace with Israel;" she praised Bush's greater "engagement and involvement" on the issue as compared with his first term.

She has disputed claims that the Democratic Party is anti-Israel, arguing that the House Democratic Caucus is more supportive of the state than its "far-right" Republican counterparts, and questioning Republican motivations on the issue.

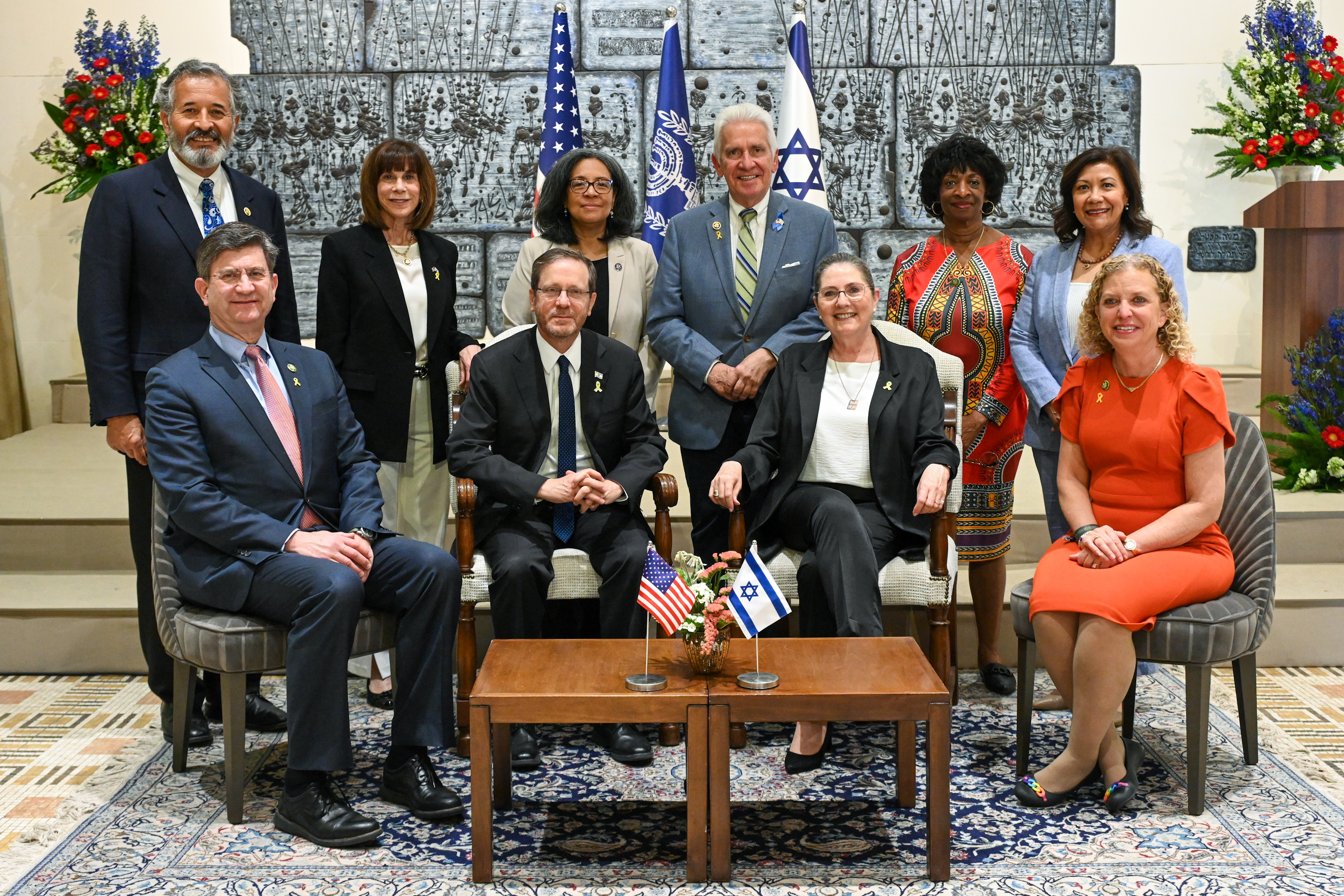
Wasserman Schultz and other members of the US congressional delegation with Israeli President Isaac Herzog in Jerusalem, March 28, 2024

Wasserman Schultz supported Israel in the 2014 Gaza War and criticized MSNBC's coverage of it, saying: "Clearly [MSNBC was] highlighting what Israel had done to Gaza and the plight of Palestinians. My first thought was, where is the balance? Where is the spotlight on what Jewish children in Israel go through from being victims of rocket attacks?"

In 2017, Wasserman Schultz supported President Trump's decision to recognize Jerusalem as Israel's capital, saying: "We must work toward a day where the entire world recognizes Jerusalem as the capital of Israel, and that can be achieved through final status negotiations. I remain as committed as ever to safeguarding Israel's future as a Jewish and democratic state, at peace with its neighbors, with Jerusalem as its undisputed capital."

She has continued to defend Israel's military action in the Gaza Strip, including the ongoing Gaza war, which began in 2023, and which has led to tens of thousands of Palestinian deaths. When the International Court of Justice issued its ruling in 2024 finding that Israel's occupation of Gaza and the West Bank are illegal under international law, Wasserman Schultz asserted that the court “discriminates against Israel”. She voiced support for a two-state solution to the conflict.

In November 2023, she voted in favor of a bill that provided an additional $14.3 billion to support Israeli military operations in the Gaza Strip.

Wasserman Schultz voted for the Antisemitism Awareness Act of 2023. She was also one of 22 Democrats to vote to censure fellow Representative Rashida Tlaib for using the phrase "from the river to the sea".

In 2024, Wasserman Schultz voted for the Stop Terror-Financing and Tax Penalties on American Hostages Act.

Wasserman Schultz voted for the "Israel Security Supplemental Appropriations Act, 2024" which was incorporated into Public Law 118-50.

In 2025, Wasserman Schultz sent a letter to Wikimedia CEO Maryana Iskander "seeking answers on how the online encyclopedia will enforce its own rules, curb editor bias and prevent antisemitism and pro-terrorist content from infiltrating Wikipedia pages".

Wasserman Schultz voted to sanction the International Criminal Court after it issued arrest warrants for Israeli leaders.

=== Presidential signing statements ===
Wasserman Schultz supports the use of appropriations for future control of presidential signing statements as revealed during questions in a July 26, 2008, House Judiciary Committee hearing on the constitutional limits of executive power.

Debbie Wasserman Schultz receives award from Plantation Democratic Club President Marvin Quittner, May 5, 2013.

=== Support for the Iran Nuclear Deal ===
In 2015, Rep. Wasserman Schultz announced her support for the Joint Comprehensive Plan of Action (JCPOA), commonly known as the Iran Nuclear Deal. This agreement has been a point of contention, with critics arguing it does not adequately prevent Iran from developing nuclear weapons.

=== Jewish American Heritage Month ===
Wasserman Schultz is Florida's first female Jewish member of Congress.

In 2022, Wasserman Schultz convened a congressional hearing to investigate allegations that big tech media companies were not holding instances of antisemitism on their respective platforms.

She and Senator Arlen Specter were the driving forces behind the resolution that declared May Jewish American Heritage Month. The annual observance was created to recognize "the accomplishments of American Jews and the important role that members of the Jewish community have played in the development of American culture". The observance is modeled after Black History Month, Hispanic Heritage Month and Women's History Month. Wasserman Schultz envisioned "classroom instruction, public ceremonies and broadcast announcements", saying, "There's a generation of children growing up with a fading memory of what happened during World War II or even an understanding of anyone who is Jewish or their culture and traditions. Through education comes tolerance." The bill introducing the observance passed unanimously in both the House and the Senate and was signed by President George W. Bush. Wasserman Schultz said of the proclamation, "This is an historic occasion. Generations to come will have the chance to live without antisemitism through greater understanding and awareness of the significant role that American Jews have played in U.S. history. Jewish American Heritage Month is a reality because of the people gathered today in this room."

The measure was criticized by Gary Cass, executive director of the now-defunct Center for Reclaiming America for Christ, a conservative Christian organization based in Fort Lauderdale, who objected to "teaching Jewish history without talk of religious practices and values", saying, "We cannot seem to have an honest discussion about the Christian roots of America". He added, "How much tolerance would [Wasserman Schultz] have for a Christian Heritage month?" She replied that the situation is different, that "Judaism is unique, because it is both a culture and a religion", and that she was not in favor of "teaching any religion in public schools". Her father, Larry Wasserman, said that while she had not been particularly active in the Jewish community before entering politics, she has "forged ties with Jewish groups as a lawmaker. She helped to form the National Jewish Democratic Council and served on the regional board of the American Jewish Congress."

=== 2008 financial crisis ===
On September 29, 2008, Wasserman Schultz voted for the Emergency Economic Stabilization Act of 2008, and on October 3, 2008, for the revised version of that act.

=== Hate crimes ===
During an April 2009 House Judiciary Committee hearing on the Hate Crimes Prevention Act of 2009, Representative Tom Rooney, a former active duty U.S. Army JAG Corps officer, introduced an amendment that would make attacks against military veterans a hate crime. Wasserman Schultz remarked on the amendment:

I'm from a state, as Mr. Rooney is, that includes and represents the districts that include real victims. I represent a very large – one of the largest – gay populations in the United States of America. One of the largest Jewish populations in the United States of America. My region – our region – has a very large African-American population. It really is belittling of the respect that we should have for these groups to suggest that members of the armed services have somehow systematically been the victims of hate crimes.

=== Death of Daniel Wultz ===
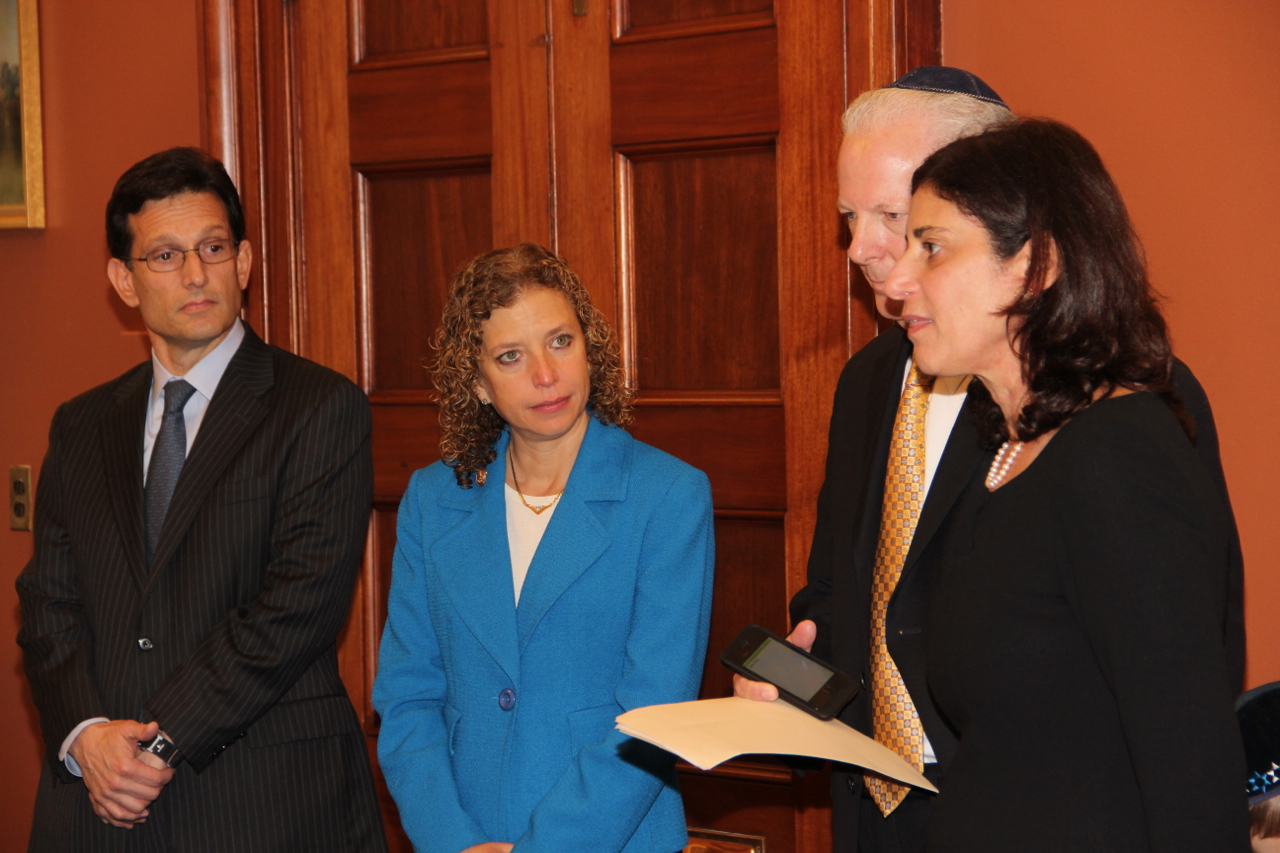
Former House majority leader Eric Cantor, left, Rep. Debbie Wasserman Schultz, second from left, listen as Sheryl and Tuly Wultz talk about the impact of prayer in the life of their son, Daniel Wultz on May 1, 2014, in the Office of the House Majority Leader, Washington, D.C.

Wasserman Schultz became a vocal advocate for the family of Daniel Wultz, constituents of hers who were engaged in legal action against the Bank of China. They alleged it had a role in financing the terrorist attack that killed the 16-year-old from Weston, Florida, in 2006.

In August 2013, Wasserman Schultz told the Miami Herald: "In South Florida, we all know too well of the tragic circumstances surrounding the cowardly terrorist attack that took Daniel Wultz's innocent life. I have been working hand in hand with the Wultz family and the state of Israel to ensure any and all of those involved in this terrorist activity, including the Bank of China, pay for their crimes so that justice can be served."

On May 1, 2014, together with then-House majority leader Eric Cantor, Wasserman Schultz hosted the Wultz family at the U.S. Capitol in a National Prayer Day event.

=== Identity theft ===
On February 15, 2013, Wasserman Schultz introduced the Stopping Tax Offenders and Prosecuting Identity Theft Act of 2013 (H.R. 744; 113th Congress) into the House. The bill would increase the penalties on identity thieves and change the definition of identity theft to include businesses and organizations instead of just individuals.

=== Marijuana ===
Wasserman Schultz opposed a 2014 medical marijuana amendment in Florida that narrowly failed to receive the 60% of votes needed to amend the Constitution of Florida. She angered medical marijuana activists and major Democratic donors over this and her comparisons of medical marijuana dispensaries to "pill mills", which overprescribe and overdispense painkillers to patients with dubious symptoms. After Wasserman Schultz expressed interest in running for the United States Senate in 2016, medical marijuana activists vowed to thwart her ambition. Attorney and donor John Morgan said that her position on medical marijuana "disqualifies her from the [Democratic Senate] nomination... Her position denies terminally ill and chronically ill people compassion."

In response, in February 2015, Wasserman Schultz's staff emailed Morgan, offering to change her position on medical marijuana if Morgan would stop criticizing her. Morgan declined her offer and released the emails to Politico, calling her a "bully". Wasserman Schultz at first declined to comment, then denied that her office had sent the emails. Morgan responded: "What Debbie leaves out in her pushback was the crystal clear message that her potential support of the new amendment [that has been proposed for the ballot in 2016] was predicated upon me withdrawing my comments to Politico. I don't know how to view that as anything but an offer of a quid pro quo."

=== Gun control ===
In 2018, Wasserman Schultz co-sponsored a bill to "strengthen school safety and security", which required a two-thirds vote for passage, given it was brought up under an expedited process. The House voted 407–10 to approve the bill, which would "provide $50 million a year for a new federal grant program to train students, teachers and law enforcement on how to spot and report signs of gun violence". Named the STOP (Students, Teachers, and Officers Preventing) School Violence Act, it would "develop anonymous telephone and online systems where people could report threats of violence." At the same time, it would authorize $25 million for schools to improve and harden their security, such as installing new locks, lights, metal detectors and panic buttons." A separate spending bill would be required to provide money for the grant program.

=== Immigration ===
During the second Donald Trump administration, Wasserman Schultz condemned the arrest of immigrants with legal status who have not committed violent crimes, perpetrated Department of Homeland Security. This congresswoman affirmed the conditions of Enforcement and Removal Operations detention centers to be inhumane, describing that these were overcrowded, maintain individuals under custody for a time that exceeds regulatory limits, and fails to satisfy basic needs.

== Electoral history ==
=== Florida House of Representatives ===
1992 Florida House of Representatives election, 97th district
Primary election
Party	Candidate	Votes	%
Democratic	Debbie Wasserman Schultz	4,260	53.38
Democratic	Pat Ernst	1,748	21.90
Democratic	John Scism	679	8.51
Democratic	Andrew Salvage	570	7.14
Democratic	Carmen Diaz Fabian	366	4.59
Democratic	Norris H. Barr	358	4.49
Total votes		7,981	100
General election
Democratic	Debbie Wasserman Schultz	31,345	64.11
Republican	Mark W. Casteel	17,550	35.89
Total votes		48,895	100
Democratic hold			

1994 Florida House of Representatives election, 97th district
Party	Candidate	Votes	%
Democratic	Debbie Wasserman Schultz (incumbent; unopposed)	N/A	100
Total votes		N/A	100
Democratic hold			

1996 Florida House of Representatives election, 97th district
Party	Candidate	Votes	%
Democratic	Debbie Wasserman Schultz (incumbent)	38,971	66.19
Republican	George W. Gardner	19,909	33.81
Total votes		58,880	100
Democratic hold			

1998 Florida House of Representatives election, 97th district
Party	Candidate	Votes	%
Democratic	Debbie Wasserman Schultz (incumbent)	32,725	72.31
Republican	Peter "Pete" Ierardi	12,534	27.69
Total votes		45,259	100
Democratic hold			

=== Florida Senate ===
2000 Florida Senate election, 32nd district
Party	Candidate	Votes	%
Democratic	Debbie Wasserman Schultz	107,052	66.39
Republican	Ken Jennings	54,191	33.61
Total votes		161,243	100
Democratic hold			

2002 Florida Senate election, 34th district
Party	Candidate	Votes	%
Democratic	Debbie Wasserman Schultz (incumbent)	65,311	63.63
Republican	Art Waganheim	37,323	36.37
Total votes		102,634	100
Democratic gain from Republican			

=== U.S. House of Representatives ===
2004 U.S. House of Representatives election, Florida's 20th district
Party	Candidate	Votes	%
Democratic	Debbie Wasserman Schultz	191,195	70.19
Republican	Margaret Hostetter	81,213	29.81
Total votes		272,408	100
Democratic hold			

2006 U.S. House of Representatives election, Florida's 20th district
Party	Candidate	Votes	%
Democratic	Debbie Wasserman Schultz (incumbent; unopposed)	N/A	100
Total votes		N/A	100
Democratic hold			

2008 U.S. House of Representatives election, Florida's 20th district
Party	Candidate	Votes	%
Democratic	Debbie Wasserman Schultz (incumbent)	202,832	77.48
Independent	Margaret Hostetter	58,958	22.52
write-in	Marc Luzietti	9	0.00
Total votes		261,799	100
Democratic hold			

2010 U.S. House of Representatives election, Florida's 20th district
Party	Candidate	Votes	%
Democratic	Debbie Wasserman Schultz (incumbent)	100,787	60.15
Republican	Karen Harrington	63,845	38.10
Independent	Stanley Blumenthal	1,663	0.99
Independent	Robert Kunst	1,272	0.76
write-in	Clayton Schock	3	0.00
Total votes		167,570	100
Democratic hold			

2012 U.S. House of Representatives election, Florida's 23rd district
Party	Candidate	Votes	%
Democratic	Debbie Wasserman Schultz (incumbent)	174,205	63.25
Republican	Karen Harrington	98,096	35.62
Independent	Ilya Katz	3,129	1.14
Total votes		275,430	100
Democratic hold			

2014 U.S. House of Representatives election, Florida's 23rd district
Party	Candidate	Votes	%
Democratic	Debbie Wasserman Schultz (incumbent)	103,269	62.67
Republican	Joseph "Joe" Kaufman	61,519	37.33
Total votes		164,788	100
Democratic hold			

2016 U.S. House of Representatives election, Florida's 23rd district
Primary election
Party	Candidate	Votes	%
Democratic	Debbie Wasserman Schultz (incumbent)	28,809	56.80
Democratic	Tim Canova	21,907	43.20
Total votes		50,716	100
General election
Democratic	Debbie Wasserman Schultz (incumbent)	183,225	56.70
Republican	Joseph "Joe" Kaufman	130,818	40.49
Independent	Don Endriss	5,180	1.60
Independent	Lyle Milstein	3,897	1.21
Total votes		323,120	100
Democratic hold			

2018 U.S. House of Representatives election, Florida's 23rd district
Primary election
Party	Candidate	Votes	%
Democratic	Debbie Wasserman Schultz (incumbent)	161,611	58.48
Republican	Joseph "Joe" Kaufman	99,446	35.98
Independent	Tim Canova	13,697	4.96
Independent	Don Endriss	1,612	0.58
Total votes		276,366	100
Democratic hold			

2020 U.S. House of Representatives election, Florida's 23rd district
Primary election
Party	Candidate	Votes	%
Democratic	Debbie Wasserman Schultz (incumbent)	55,729	72.04
Democratic	Jennifer "Jen" Perelman	21,631	27.96
Total votes		77,360	100
General election
Democratic	Debbie Wasserman Schultz (incumbent)	221,239	58.19
Republican	Carla Spalding	158,874	41.79
write-in	Jeff Olson	46	0.01
write-in	Demetrius "DB" Fugate	37	0.01
Total votes		380,196	100
Democratic hold			

2022 U.S. House of Representatives election, Florida's 25th district
Primary election
Party	Candidate	Votes	%
Democratic	Debbie Wasserman Schultz (incumbent)	50,554	89.01
Democratic	Robert Millwee	6,241	10.99
Total votes		56,795	100
General election
Democratic	Debbie Wasserman Schultz (incumbent)	129,113	55.09
Republican	Carla Spalding	105,239	44.91
Total votes		234,352	100
Democratic hold			

2024 U.S. House of Representatives election, Florida's 25th district
Primary election
Party	Candidate	Votes	%
Democratic	Debbie Wasserman Schultz (incumbent)	36,479	83.23
Democratic	Jennifer "Jen" Perelman	7,349	16.77
Total votes		43,828	100
General election
Democratic	Debbie Wasserman Schultz (incumbent)	186,942	54.47
Republican	Chris Eddy	156,208	45.52
write-in	Eric Goldfarb	41	0.01
Total votes		343,191	100
Democratic hold			

2026 U.S. House of Representatives election, Florida's 20th district
Primary election
Party	Candidate	Votes	%
Democratic	Debbie Wasserman Schultz (incumbent)	30,505	45.30
Democratic	Dale Holness	15,571	23.12
Democratic	Elijah Manley	9,377	13.93
Democratic	Sheila Cherfilus-McCormick	6,193	9.20
Democratic	Luther "Uncle Luke" Campbell	5,691	8.45
Total votes		67,337	100

== Personal life ==
Wasserman Schultz lives in Weston, near Fort Lauderdale. She is married to Steve Schultz; they have three children. She is an active member of the National Jewish Democratic Council, Planned Parenthood, and Hadassah.

In March 2009, she revealed that she had undergone seven surgeries related to breast cancer in 2008 while maintaining her responsibilities as a member of the House. That year, she promoted efforts for early screening for breast cancer.

== Awards and honors ==
- Crime Fighter of the Year Award, Rape Abuse and Incest National Network (RAINN), 2008
- Giraffe Award, Women's Advocacy Majority Minority (WAMM), 1993
- Outstanding Family Advocacy award, Dade County Psychol. Assn., 1993
- Rosemary Barkett award, Academy of Florida Trial Lawyers, 1995
- Woman of the Year, AMIT, 1994
- Outstanding Legislator of the year, Florida Federation of Business & Professional Women, 1994
- Quality Floridian, Florida League of Cities, 1994
- Woman of Vision, Weizmann Institute of Science
- One of Six Most Unstoppable Women, South Florida Magazine, 1994.

== See also ==
- List of Jewish members of the United States Congress
- Women in the United States House of Representatives

U.S. House of Representatives
Preceded by Peter Deutsch	Member of the U.S. House of Representatives from Florida's 20th congressional district 2005–2013	Succeeded by Alcee Hastings
Preceded by Alcee Hastings	Member of the U.S. House of Representatives from Florida's 23rd congressional district 2013–2023	Succeeded by Jared Moskowitz
Preceded by Mario Díaz-Balart	Member of the U.S. House of Representatives from Florida's 25th congressional district 2023–present	Incumbent
Party political offices
Preceded by Gwen Moore; Jan Schakowsky	Chair of the Democratic Women's Working Group; 2011–2013; Served alongside: Gwen Moore	Succeeded by Donna Edwards
Preceded by Donna Brazile; Acting	Chair of the Democratic National Committee; 2011–2016	Succeeded by Donna Brazile; Acting
U.S. order of precedence (ceremonial)
Preceded by Gwen Moore	United States representatives by seniority 51st	Succeeded by Doris Matsui
Preceded by Emanuel Cleaver	Order of precedence of the United States	Succeeded by Henry Cuellar
