= 2006 Tel Aviv bombing =

2006 Tel Aviv bombing may refer to:

- 1st Rosh Ha'ir restaurant bombing
- 2nd Rosh Ha'ir restaurant bombing
