= Energy Independence and Security Act of 2007 =

United States law

- Other short titles: Advanced Geothermal Energy Research and Development Act of 2007; Department of Energy Carbon Capture and Sequestration Research, Development, and Demonstration Act of 2007; Green Jobs Act of 2007; Marine and Hydrokinetic Renewable Energy Research and Development Act; Solar Energy Research and Advancement Act of 2007; Ten-in-Ten Fuel Economy Act; United States Energy Storage Competitiveness Act of 2007; Virginia Graeme Baker Pool and Spa Safety Act
- Long title: An Act to move the United States toward greater energy independence and security, to increase the production of clean renewable fuels, to protect consumers, to increase the efficiency of products, buildings, and vehicles, to promote research on and deploy greenhouse gas capture and storage options, and to improve the energy performance of the Federal Government, and for other purposes.
- Acronyms (colloquial): EISA
- Nicknames: Long-Term Energy Alternatives for the Nation Act
- Enacted by: the 110th United States Congress
- Effective: December 19, 2007

Citations
- Public law: 110-140
- Statutes at Large: 121 Stat. 1492

Codification
- Titles amended: 42 U.S.C.: Public Health and Social Welfare
- U.S.C. sections created: 42 U.S.C. ch. 152 § 17001 et seq.

Legislative history
- Introduced in the House as H.R. 6 by Nick J. Rahall, II (D–WV) on January 12, 2007; Committee consideration by House Ways and Means, House Natural Resources, House Budget, House Rules, House Transportation and Infrastructure; Passed the House on January 18, 2007 (264-163, Roll call vote 040, via Clerk.House.gov); Passed the Senate on June 21, 2007 (65-27, Roll call vote 226, via Senate.gov) with amendment; House agreed to Senate amendment on December 6, 2007 (235-181, Roll call vote 1140, via Clerk.House.gov) with further amendment; Senate agreed to House amendment on December 13, 2007 (86-8, Roll call vote 430, via Senate.gov); Signed into law by President George W. Bush on December 19, 2007

The Energy Independence and Security Act of 2007 (Pub.L. 110-140), originally named the Clean Energy Act of 2007, is an Act of Congress concerning the energy policy of the United States. As part of the Democratic Party's 100-Hour Plan during the 110th Congress, it was introduced in the United States House of Representatives by Representative Nick Rahall of West Virginia, along with 198 cosponsors. Even though Rahall was 1 of only 4 Democrats to oppose the final bill, it passed in the House without amendment in January 2007. When the Act was introduced in the Senate in June 2007, it was combined with Senate Bill S. 1419: Renewable Fuels, Consumer Protection, and Energy Efficiency Act of 2007. This amended version passed the Senate on June 21, 2007. After further amendments and negotiation between the House and Senate, a revised bill passed both houses on December 18, 2007 and President Bush, a Republican, signed it into law on December 19, 2007, in response to his "Twenty in Ten" challenge to reduce gasoline consumption by 20% in 10 years.

The stated purpose of the act is "to move the United States toward greater energy independence and security, to increase the production of clean renewable fuels, to protect consumers, to increase the efficiency of products, buildings, and vehicles, to promote research on and deploy greenhouse gas capture and storage options, and to improve the energy performance of the Federal Government, and for other purposes.". House Speaker Nancy Pelosi promoted the Act as a way of lowering energy costs to consumers. The bill followed another major piece of energy legislation, the Energy Policy Act of 2005.

The bill originally sought to cut subsidies to the petroleum industry in order to promote petroleum independence and different forms of alternative energy. These tax changes were ultimately dropped after opposition in the Senate, and the final bill focused on automobile fuel economy, development of biofuels, and energy efficiency in public buildings and lighting.

== Summary of legislation ==
The bill signed into law in December 2007 was an 822-page document changing U.S. energy policy in many areas.

=== Title I ===
Title I contains the first increase in fuel economy standards for passenger cars since 1975, and the establishment of the first efficiency standard for medium-duty and heavy-duty commercial vehicles. By the year 2020, it is estimated to save Americans a total of $22 billion and have a significant reduction in emissions equivalent to removing 28 million cars from the road. Title I is responsible for 60% of the estimated energy savings of the bill.

==== A. Increased Corporate Average Fuel Economy ====
- Increased Corporate Average Fuel Economy standards. Automakers are required to boost fleetwide gas mileage to at least 35 mpg (14.8 km/L) by the 2020 model year. This applies to all light-duty automobiles, including light trucks, but not "work trucks."
- Manufacturers of domestically manufactured passenger automobiles must meet the average fuel economy standard of 27.5 miles per gallon or come within 92% of the standard for a given model year, the minimum standard.
- Requires the development of standards for work trucks and commercial medium-duty and heavy-duty vehicles.
- Manufacturers can receive credit in one vehicle class if it exceeds the CAFE standards, allowing them make up for another vehicle class that may be below standards. Credits can also be exchanged between manufacturers. There are restriction on credit trading or transferring to meet the minimum standard.

==== B. Vehicle technology ====
- Required vehicle technology and transportation electrification. Incentives for the development of plug-in hybrids.
- Establishes a loan program for advancing battery technology.
- Awards grants to automobile manufacturers to promote production of electric transportation technology
- Establishes incentives for fleet buying of heavy-duty hybrid vehicles.

==== C. Federal vehicle fleets ====
- New conservation requirements for federal vehicle fleets.
- Federal agencies cannot use light-duty or medium-duty passenger vehicles that do not meet the new low greenhouse emission standards.
- Using 2005 as a baseline, by 2015 Federal agencies must reduce petroleum consumption by 20% and increase the use of annual alternative fuel by 10% yearly.

=== Title II ===
Title II contains the first legislation that specifically requires the creation of biomass-based diesel fuel, which is the addition of renewable biofuels to diesel fuel. To be labeled as Biomass-based Diesel, fuel must be able to reduce emissions by 50 percent when compared to petroleum diesel. As of now, Biodiesel is the only commercial fuel that meets this requirement .

==== A. Renewable Fuel Standard ====
- The total amount of biofuels used in the U.S. is required to be at least an amount stated in the legislation. The total target volume increases to 36 billion US gallons (140,000,000 m^{3}) by 2022, from 4.7 billion US gallons (18,000,000 m^{3}) mandated in 2007. The Energy Independence and Security Act further specifies that 21 billion US gallons (79,000,000 m^{3}) of the 2022 total must be derived from non-cornstarch products (e.g. sugar, biodiesel, or cellulose).

==== B. Biofuels research and development ====
- States with low cellulosic biomass ethanol production may be rewarded grants for research, development, and application of biofuel technologies.
- Requires the Secretary of Energy to initiate studies on the use of algae as a feedstock for biofuel production, studies on the durability and performance of engines with the use of biodiesel, and studies to optimize the use of E-85 fuel in flexible fueled vehicles.

=== Title III ===
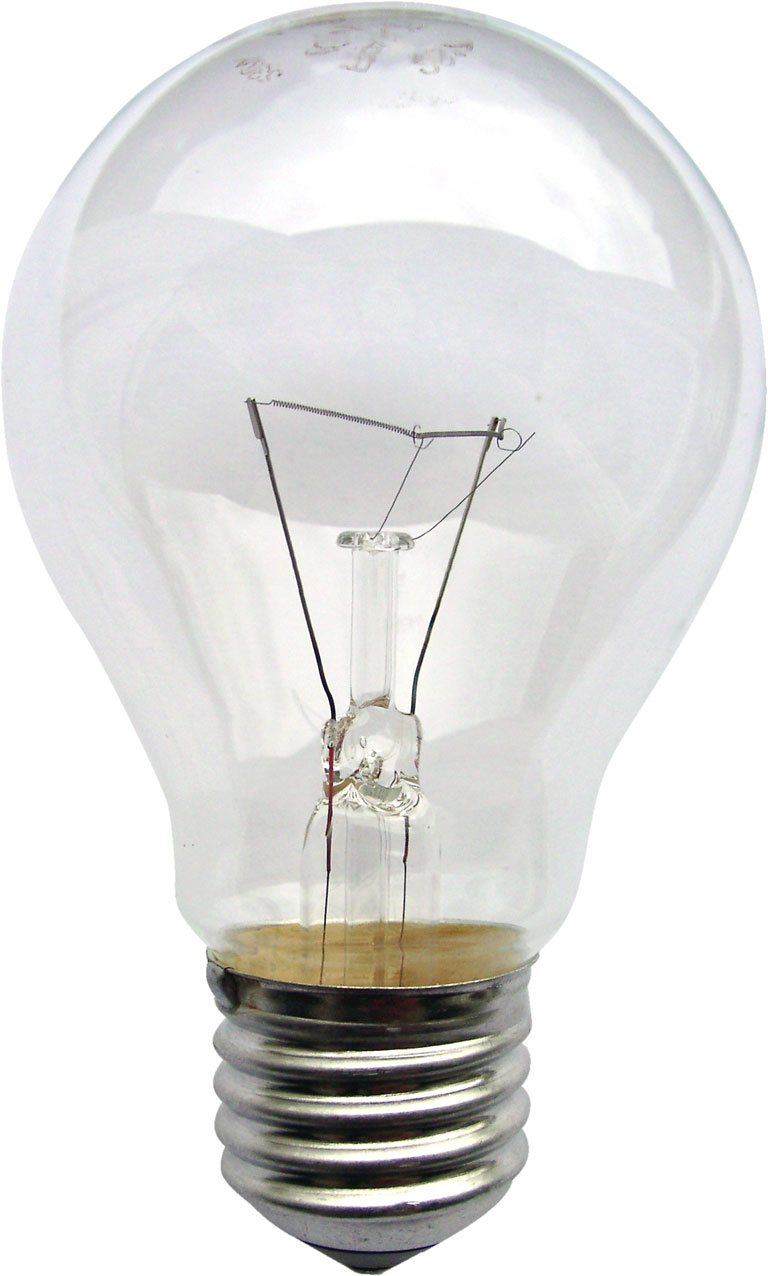
Incandescent light bulbs were slated to be phased out in the U.S. beginning January 2012.

Title III contains standards for ten appliances and equipment: residential boilers, clothes dryers, room air conditioners, clothes washers, residential water heaters, dishwashers, kitchen stove ovens, microwave ovens, and dehumidifiers. Previous national efficiency standards for covered products were made in 1987, 1988, 1992 and 2005.

==== A. Appliance energy efficiency ====
- New efficiency standards for external power supplies, in-home appliances, electric motors, residential boilers, and heating and air conditioning equipment.

==== B. Lighting energy efficiency ====
- Required roughly 25 percent greater efficiency for light bulbs, phased in from 2012 through 2014. This effectively bans the manufacturing and importing of the then-common incandescent light bulbs, though by 2013 at least one company had introduced a redesigned incandescent bulb for which it claimed 50 percent greater efficiency than conventional incandescents.
- Various specialty bulbs, including appliance bulbs, "rough service" bulbs, colored lights, plant lights, and 3-way bulbs, are exempt from these requirements as well as light bulbs currently less than 40 watts or more than 150 watts. This exempts stage lighting and landscape lighting.
- Required roughly 200 percent greater efficiency for light bulbs, or similar energy savings, by 2020.

=== Title IV ===
Industrial and commercial buildings are responsible for using almost half of the nation's energy and greenhouse gas emissions, costing over $200 billion each year. Title IV aims to reduce the energy used of Federal buildings by 30 percent by the year 2015.

==== B. Commercial buildings ====
- New initiatives for promoting conservation in buildings and industry.
- Creates an Office of Commercial High Performance Green Buildings in the Department of Energy, and promotes the development of more energy efficient buildings.
- Aims to create a nationwide zero-net-energy initiative for commercial buildings built after 2025. Buildings built before 2025 should also meet the initiative by 2050.
- The Department of Energy is responsible for educating the public about high performance green buildings.

==== C. Federal buildings ====
- Requires all lighting in Federal buildings to use Energy Star products.
- New standards and grants for promoting efficiency in government and public institutions. New and renovated federal buildings must reduce fossil fuel use by 55% (from 2003 levels) by 2010, and 80% by 2020. All new federal buildings must be carbon-neutral by 2030.

==== D. Industrial energy efficiency ====
- The Department of Energy must research and develop ways to improve the energy efficiency of equipment and processes used in industry.
- The Environmental Protection Agency must create a waste energy recovery program.

==== E. Education ====
- Provides grants to build energy efficient schools that utilize natural lighting and other energy features to states, local governments, and school systems.
- The EPA is to study the effects energy efficient building features have on school aged children.

==== F. Institutional entities ====
- Creates grants in order to support energy efficiency and sustainability at public institutions

==== G. Public and assisted housing ====
- The Department of Housing and Urban Development must update the energy standards for public and assisted housing.

==== H. General provisions ====
- A $10 million fund is granted to the DOE Office of Commercial High Performance Buildings and the GSA Office of Federal High Performance Buildings to do one federal project each year for five years.
- A $10 million fund is also provided for four projects at universities over five years.

=== Other provisions ===
- Repeal of liability limitations for oil companies for using methyl tertiary butyl ether (MTBE) to gasoline. MTBE was added to fuel both to enhance octane and reduce air pollution by acting as an oxygenate. MTBE was a large liability for gasoline producers due to leaking tanks polluting water supplies. Many states, including California, had already banned the substance.
- The H-Prize program, which awards cash prizes for technological advances toward a hydrogen economy
- Taxpayer funding of research and development of solar energy, geothermal energy, and marine and hydrokinetic renewable energy technologies.
- Expanded federal research on carbon sequestration technologies.
- Green jobs – creation of a training program for "Energy efficiency and renewable energy workers".
- Energy transportation and infrastructure. New initiatives for highway, sea and railroad infrastructure. Creation of the Office of Climate Change and Environment in the Department of Transportation.
- Small business energy programs, offering small businesses loans toward energy efficiency improvements.
- Smart grid – modernization of the electricity grid to improve reliability and efficiency.
- Pool safety – new federal standards for drain covers and pool barriers. Originally known as the Virginia Graeme Baker Pool and Spa Safety Act, eventually incorporated into this EISA Act.
- L prize, to spur development of LED light replacements.

== Proposals not enacted ==
The House passed versions of the bill which contained two controversial provisions: a renewable portfolio standard which required that utilities to produce 15% of their power from renewable energy and a tax package which would fund renewable energy through the repeal of $21 billion in oil and gas tax breaks; the Senate failed to pass these provisions in two cloture votes. On June 21, 2007, an attempt by the Senate Democrats to raise taxes on oil & gas by $32 billion was reportedly blocked by the Republicans.

Title I of the original bill, the "Ending Subsidies for Big Oil Act of 2007," denied certain tax deductions to producers of oil, natural gas, or primary products of oil or natural gas, and increased from five to seven years the period during which five major integrated oil companies must write off their expenditures on geological and geophysical studies related to oil exploration.

Title II, the "Royalty Relief for American Consumers Act of 2007," addressed an oversight that occurred when the Interior Department issued oil and gas leases for off-shore drilling in the Gulf of Mexico in 1998 and 1999. The leases didn't include price thresholds that require companies to pay royalties to the Federal Government when the price of oil and gas exceeds a certain level. These companies would be required to renegotiate their leases to include price thresholds that are equal or less than thresholds described in the Outer Continental Shelf Lands Act. Companies who failed to renegotiate their leases or pay the fees would not be allowed to obtain any oil or gas leases in the Gulf of Mexico.

Title II also repealed several provisions of the Energy Policy Act of 2005. One provision suspended royalty fees on oil and gas production in certain waters of the Gulf of Mexico. A provision of the Energy Policy Act that protects drilling permit applicants from additional fees to recover the cost of processing paperwork would also be repealed, and special policies for leases in the National Petroleum Reserve–Alaska and royalty relief for specific offshore drilling in Alaska would be discontinued.

Title III of the bill created a Strategic Energy Efficiency and Renewables Reserve, an account to hold additional money received by the Federal Government as a result of the enactment of the act, and to offset the cost of subsequent legislation.

== Opposition ==
=== Oil industry taxes ===
Opponents argued that the act would "increase Americans reliance on foreign sources of energy by making new domestic exploration and production more costly" and stated that markets should drive U.S. energy policy. They were concerned that the Strategic Energy Efficiency and Renewables Reserve would be used for "politically connected pet projects," citing a similar fund created by the Carter administration that went bankrupt after only a few years.

The U.S. Chamber of Commerce said that the bill would punish an industry that has made many Americans wealthy for generations, adding that "Congress and various Administrations have perhaps imposed more regulations on the oil and gas industry than any other industry in the United States." The Chamber said it supported the rapid development of alternative fuels but that the new technologies are not developed enough, and are insufficient to make any real difference. It believed more regulation on oil and gas producers is not the answer to the energy problem.

Grover Norquist, Conservative activist and president of Americans for Tax Reform, characterized the bill's provisions regarding renegotiation of leases as a violation of binding contracts, calling the bill "a violation of the Taxpayer Protection Pledge" since it wouldn't create tax cuts to offset the additional revenue it would raise.

Representative Ted Poe said the bill "will decrease U.S. exploration and will increase our dependence on foreign oil," and, "by raising taxes and fees on oil and gas companies that choose to manufacture in America, the U.S. will become a less attractive place to produce oil and natural gas. This essentially creates incentives for foreign importation and could kill manufacturing jobs in an industry that employs nearly 1.8 million Americans."

=== Fuel economy ===
Congressmen representing automobile manufacturing regions objected to the proposed increase in fuel economy standards. They said the measure would sharply increase the cost of new cars, lowering demand and further burdening the struggling automotive industry. Representative John Dingell of Michigan advocated instead an increase in the federal gasoline tax, which he said would have more immediate effects on oil consumption by influencing consumer behavior (i.e. car purchase decisions and total miles driven).

=== Energy efficient lamps ===
Compact fluorescent lamps were an existing technology that exceeded the initial EISA 2007 requirements for lumens per watt. LED bulbs were not in widespread use or affordable in 2007. Energy efficient halogen bulbs also met the minimum EISA requirements (see below).

== Support ==
=== Oil industry taxes ===
The majority of the supporters for the original bill were Representatives from the Democratic party. Speaker of the House Nancy Pelosi described the vote as "the first step toward a future of energy independence." Moira Chapin, Environment California Federal Field Organizer, said "the 110th Congress made a down payment on a new energy future," referring to its investment in renewable energy resources from solar and wind power generation facilities.

Proponents believed that investing the new tax revenue in renewable energy resources would foster a new industry, creating more jobs and helping to reduce American dependency on oil imports. They claimed that as many as 3.3 million new jobs would be created, cutting unemployment, adding $1.4 trillion to the gross national product in the economy, and paying for itself within ten years. Air quality would be improved by reducing the amount of emissions released by using a cleaner energy source other than oil.

Another supporter of the bill, Representative Steve Rothman of New Jersey, said that if the proposed bill passed, "the U.S. can improve air quality, create jobs, and corner a new business market."

=== Bulb manufacturers ===
Under the law, incandescent bulbs that produced 310–2600 lumens of light were effectively phased out between 2012 and 2014 unless they could meet the increasing energy efficiency standards mandated by the bill. Bulbs outside this range (roughly, light bulbs currently less than 40 watts or more than 150 watts) were exempt from the ban. Also exempt were several classes of speciality lights, including appliance lamps, "rough service" bulbs, 3-way, colored lamps, and plant lights.

In 2013, Advanced Lighting Technologies, an Ohio company that develops and manufactures lighting products, announced the release of an incandescent bulb that it claimed significantly exceeds the efficiency requirements of the law

By 2020, a second tier of restrictions was set to take effect, requiring all general-purpose bulbs to produce at least 45 lumens per watt (similar to CFLs in 2007 but far less efficient than that the LED bulbs that have since become available and affordable). Exemptions from the Act included reflector floodlights, 3-way bulbs, candelabra, colored bulbs, and other specialty bulbs.

The phase-out of inefficient incandescent light bulbs was supported by the Alliance to Save Energy, a coalition of light bulb manufacturers, electric utilities and conservation groups. The group estimated that lighting accounts for 22% of total U.S. electricity usage, and that eliminating incandescent bulbs completely would save $18 billion per year (equivalent to the output of 80 coal plants). Light bulb manufacturers also hoped a single national standard would prevent the enactment of conflicting bans and efficiency standards by state governments.

== Legislative history ==
The initial version of H.R. 6 passed the House of Representatives on January 18, 2007, by a vote of 264 to 163. The Senate version passed 65–27 on June 21, but bore almost no resemblance to the original bill. Speaker Pelosi indicated on Oct 10 that instead of sending the bill to a conference committee, the House would negotiate informally with the Senate to resolve their differences.

The House took up the energy bill again in December, passing a new version on December 6. This version, renamed the "Energy Independence and Security Act of 2007", restored the oil industry tax increases of the original bill. It also added a requirement that U.S. electric utilities must obtain 15 percent of their power from renewable sources by 2020.

When this bill was introduced to the Senate, the new provisions became the focus of debate. The White House and Sen. Domenici warned that Bush would veto the bill because of the tax portion. Senate Minority Leader Mitch McConnell (R-Ky.) said Democrats had "shown how to snatch defeat from the jaws of victory" by "inserting an enormous tax hike, a tax hike they knew would doom this legislation." Reid said Congress should not be intimidated by a veto threat, "We are the Congress of the United States. We can write things even though the president may not like them." Democrats said that the tax measure was modest and only took back tax breaks the oil companies received in 2004 and that they did not need them with oil prices at about $90 a barrel.

The House version of the bill (with $13 billion raised from the oil industry, a mandate that utilities rely on renewable energy for at least 15 percent of their power generation, and a $21.8 billion 10-year tax package) failed by a one-vote margin. A final attempt to end debate and make way for a vote failed by 59–40 despite the return of four Democratic presidential candidates, Hillary Clinton (NY), Barack Obama (Ill.), Christopher Dodd (Conn.), and Joseph Biden (Del.). Nine Republicans voted in favor of ending debate while one Democrat, Sen. Mary Landrieu (D-La.) voted against it. Sen. John McCain was not present.

The revised Senate bill passed 86–8 on December 13. The House approved this final version 314–100 on December 18, and President Bush signed it the following day.

== Reaction ==
=== Economic and environmental effects of the Renewable Fuel Standard ===
A 2011 report from the United States National Research Council investigated the potential economic and environmental effects of reaching the Renewable Fuel Standard, which mandates that 35 billion gallons of ethanol-equivalent biofuels and 1 billion gallons of biomass-based diesel be consumed in the United States by 2022.

The study found that the United States already has the capacity to produce 14 billion gallons of corn-grain ethanol (an amount close to the consumption mandate for conventional biofuels in 2022) and has infrastructure for producing 2.7 billion gallons of biomass-based diesel, Some of the key factors that influence environmental effects of biofuels are site specific and depend on the type of feedstocks produced, the management practices used to produce them, prior land use, and any land-use changes that their production might incur. In addition to greenhouse-gas emissions, production and use of biofuels affect air quality, water quality, water use, and biodiversity.

A 2018 US EPA report to the Congress confirmed conclusions of the previous report and found that the expected transition to the second generation biofuels has not been realized; biofuels are still mainly produced from corn grain and soy beans. The impacts on environment is predominantly negative and include land use shift from conservation to agriculture, increase in water abstraction for irrigation, reduction in air and water quality, and reduced biodiversity.

A 2021 study led by researchers at the University of Wisconsin found that the Renewable Fuel Standard increased corn prices by 30% and those of soybeans and wheat by 20%. These price hikes increased corn cultivation by 8.7% which necessitated additional fertilizer usage that increased rates of nitrous oxide emissions and water pollution. The price hikes also incited land-use change that increased the total U.S. cropland extent by 2.4% through 2016 and resulted in substantial carbon emissions. In total, the emissions from these changes were sufficient to make corn-ethanol's carbon intensity no lower than gasoline's and up to 24% higher.

=== Defunding of incandescent light-bulb phaseout ===
In December 2011, the U.S. Congress defunded enforcement of EISA Title III light-bulb performance requirements as part of the Consolidated Appropriations Act in the 2012 federal budget. However, a representative of the American lighting industry said that "the industry has moved on" and that American manufacturers have already retooled production lines to make other bulbs.

=== Food prices ===
In the wake of the 2012 North American drought, which had a devastating effect on the US corn crop, there were calls for the quota imposed by the Renewable Fuel Standard to be suspended. In August 2012, 25 senators and over 100 house members echoed the demand. The head of the Food and Agriculture Organization, José Graziano da Silva, called on the United States to suspend the quota. Writing in a letter to the Financial Times he argued that the reduced harvest and the large demand for corn created by the quota has caused an unaffordable price rise in a key food crop. At this point the quota meant that biofuel production accounted for 40% of the entire US corn crop.

According to research sponsored by the United States government, the World Bank, and other organizations, there is no clear link between the RFS and higher food prices. Ethanol critics contend that RFS requirements crowd out production that would go to feed livestock.

== See also ==
- Advanced Technology Vehicles Manufacturing Loan Program
- Electrical energy efficiency on United States farms
- High-Performance Green Buildings
- American Recovery and Reinvestment Act of 2009
- U.S. Lighting Energy Policy
- United States vs. Imperial Petroleum
