= United States v. Imperial Petroleum, Inc. =

UNITED STATES SECURITIES AND EXCHANGE COMMISSION v. IMPERIAL PETROLEUM, INC. et al
- Court: United States District Court for the Southern District of Indiana
- Full case name: United States Securities and Exchange Commission, United States of America v. Imperial Petroleum, Inc., Caravan Trading, Brian Carmichael, CIMA Energy Group, CIMA Green, Chad Ducey, Craig Ducey, Joseph Furando, Evelyn Katirina Pattison, Jeffrey Wilson
- Decided: May 18, 2018
- Citation: 1:13-cv-1489-WTL-MJD (S.D. Ind. May. 18, 2018)
- Transcript: https://www.govinfo.gov/app/details/USCOURTS-insd-1_13-cv-01489

Case history
- Prior action: SEC's motion for default judgment against Imperial is GRANTED IN PART (September 14, 2018)

Court membership
- Judge sitting: William T. Lawrence

Case opinions
- Decision by: William T. Lawrence

United States vs. Imperial Petroleum is a federal criminal case in which Imperial Petroleum and others were accused of selling Renewable Identification Number(RIN)-stripped B99 as pure biodiesel.

== Premise ==
On September 19, 2013, Jeffrey T. Wilson, Craig Ducey, Chad Ducey, Brian Carmichael, Joseph Furando, Evelyn Pattison, Caravan Trading LLC, Cima Green LLC, CIMA Energy Group and Imperial Petroleum were indicted in what United States Attorney for the Southern District of Indiana Joe Hogsett referred to as "the largest instance of tax and securities fraud in state history" (in Indiana). E-Biofuels of Middletown, Indiana was also under investigation. Per the Energy Independence and Security Act of 2007, a tax subsidy was offered to the first person or organization to mix pure biodiesel (B100) with petroleum diesel. The individuals were accused of fraudulently selling over 130 Megaliters of RIN-stripped B99 to clients who paid an artificially augmented dollar amount while believing that they were acquiring B100 with RINs and a tax subsidy. At the time of the indictment, estimates of the damages to buyers exceeded $100 million USD, much of which was allegedly spent on automobiles, art and travel. By 2016, Wilson, Furando, Carmichael, and the three Duceys had been found guilty and convicted in court.

== History ==
Robert Dreher of the United States Department of Justice along with Hogsett reported indictments against six people and three companies with respect to renewable fuel program related legal issues. One other individual was charged, and has agreed to plead guilty and to work with the government.

== Allegations ==
The allegations made were:

1. In certain instances, the biodiesel was moved from fuel terminals to the E-Biofuels establishment. The biodiesel was then placed in tankers and delivered unbeknownst to clients coupled with false documents labeling it as B100 with RINs manufactured by E-Biofuels.
2. In other cases, the drivers did not deposit the fuel in Middletown, but instead collected false documents that claimed that the truck contained B100 with RINs that originated in Middletown.
3. In the most dire cases, drivers delivered RIN-stripped B99 from fuel terminals directly to clients. Known as "ghost loads" or "phantom loads", the shipments never saw the E-Biofuels facility. The accused are claimed to have electronically sent fraudulent documents to drivers en route between the fuel terminals and the client establishments.

== Case ==
Craig Ducey, Chad Ducey, Chris Ducey and Brian Carmichael were in charge of E Biofuels, a manufacturer of biodiesel made using "feedstocks" such as vegetable oil and animal fat. It was alleged that the Ducey's and Carmichael worked with Joe Furando and Evelyn Katirina Pattison who both led a pair of companies called Caravan Trading Company and CIMA Green to buy RIN-stripped B99 and give the impression that E-Biofuels manufactured the fuel in order to falsely resell it as B100 with RINs coupled with a tax subsidy (acting only as a pass-through establishment).

In 2016, Craig Ducey and Wilson were sentenced to 74 months and 120 months in prison. Chad Ducey was sentenced to 84 months in prison. The others, Joseph Furando, Katirina Tracy, Brian Carmichael and Chris Ducey were sentenced at prior hearings.

== See also ==
- Energy Independence and Security Act of 2007
