= Virginia Graeme Baker Pool and Spa Safety Act =

2007 United States law

- Long title: An Act to increase the safety of swimming pools and spas by requiring the use of proper anti-entrapment drain covers, establishing a pool and spa safety grant program, and for other purposes.
- Acronyms (colloquial): VGBA
- Enacted by: the 110th United States Congress

Citations
- Public law: Pub. L. 110–140 (text) (PDF), Title XIV
- Statutes at Large: 122 Stat. 2800; 122 Stat. 2879

Codification
- Acts amended: Consumer Product Safety Act
- Titles amended: 15 U.S.C. § 8001 et seq. (Pool and spa safety)

Legislative history
- Introduced in the House as H.R. 1721 by Rep. Debbie Wasserman Schultz (D–FL) on March 27, 2007; Committee consideration by House Energy and Commerce; Subcommittee on Commerce, Trade, and Consumer Protection; Passed the House on October 9, 2007 (Passed by voice vote); Passed the Senate on October 15, 2007; Signed into law by President George W. Bush on December 19, 2007

The Virginia Graeme Baker Pool and Spa Safety Act (VGBA) is a United States law named after Virginia Graeme Baker, who died after sustaining a pool suction-drain injury in June 2002, when the suction from a spa drain entrapped her under the water. It is incorporated as Title 14 of the U.S. Energy Independence and Security Act of 2007 (EISA Title 14, Pub.L. 110-140). This act became enforceable law on December 19, 2008.

== Goals ==
The goals of the VGBA were to enhance the safety of public and private pools and spas, to reduce child drownings, to reduce the number of suction entrapment incidents, injuries, and deaths; and to educate the public on the importance of constant supervision of children in and around water.

== Virginia Graeme Baker ==
Virginia Graeme Baker was a seven-year-old girl who drowned when she was trapped underwater by the powerful suction of a hot tub drain. She was a proficient swimmer for her age and had been able to swim on her own since the age of three. Additionally, she was a member of her community swim and dive team. Her parents are Nancy and James Baker IV. James Baker is the son of former Secretary of State James Baker III.

In June 2002, Graeme was stuck to a hot tub drain by suction. Efforts by her mother to free her were unsuccessful and when two men eventually were able to free her (postmortem), the drain broke from the force. Although Graeme drowned, her official cause of death was "suction entrapment due to a faulty drain cover". Following Graeme's death in June 2002, her mother, Nancy Baker, began work to advocate pool and spa safety. She began lobbying Congress to pass legislation to require anti-entrapment drain covers as well as other pool and spa safety devices. EISA was introduced to Congress on January 12, 2007, and signed into law on December 19, 2007, by President George W. Bush.

== Death of Abigail Taylor ==
Abigail Rose Taylor (May 24, 2001 - March 20, 2008) was a young girl from Edina, Minnesota, whose accidental injury and eventual death led to federal legislation to improve the safety of swimming pools.

On June 29, 2007, six-year-old Taylor's parents took her to the Minneapolis Golf Club in St. Louis Park, Minnesota. Taylor accidentally fell on the open drain of the pool and her buttocks were sucked into the aperture. The suction dislodged a large section of her small intestine, which was forcefully drawn out through the anus, a phenomenon known as transanal evisceration. Taylor lost 6.5 meters (21 feet) of her small intestine in the accident, leaving her with short bowel syndrome. Taylor was hospitalized and received a rare triple organ transplant to replace her small intestine, liver, and pancreas, all of which were damaged in the accident. She was unable to eat or drink, and she required total parenteral nutrition. After multiple operations, Taylor later died from transplant-related cancer.

The incident was similar to a 1993 incident in North Carolina involving Valerie Lakey. The pool drains in question in both the Taylor and the Lakey cases were manufactured by Sta-Rite, a division of Minnesota-based Pentair. Lakey received a $25 million settlement with the help of lawyer (and later Senator) John Edwards.

== Entrapment ==
Consumer Product Safety Commission staff began investigating reported incidents of swimming pool and spa suction entrapment incidents in the 1970s. Such incidents included entrapment of hair, body, limb, evisceration or disembowelment and mechanical entrapment of jewelry or bathing suits. From 1999 to 2007 for all age categories records were examined. In 2007, for all age categories, there were 74 reports of circulation entrapments. Individuals in the 5- to 9-year-old category had the highest frequency of entrapment reports.

74 reports of circulation entrapments in 2007
Pool/Spa	Deaths	Injuries
Public	2	20
Residential	7	33
Unknown	0	10
Gender		
Male	4	28
Female	5	35

== Pool/spa accident statistics ==
Between January 1985 and March 2002, there were 147 confirmed, recorded suction-entrapment incidents, according to Consumer Product Safety Commission records. 51 of those were hair entanglement, 79 body or limb entrapments (including three eviscerations), four mechanical (jewelry, etc) and 13 unknown. Of the 147 incidents, 36 resulted in deaths. While the first documented case is unclear, lawyer John Edwards points to a case in 1974.

According to the National Safety Council (NSC), 172 children under the age of 15 drowned in pools or spas between Memorial Day and Labor Day in 2010. An additional 180 children under the age of 15 were injured. The NSC is further calling for increased vigilance by parents and pool/spa owners. They suggest precautions such as four-sided fences for pool/spa areas, alarms on all doors accessing pool/spa areas, heavy duty pool covers, anti-entrapment drains and close supervision of children near pools/spas.

== Drain provisions ==
A drain is defined as a plumbing fitting installed on the suction side of a pump in a pool, spa or hot tub. Drains are now required to be "unblockable." This term has previously been defined in the "definitions" section. Four main ways of keeping a drain from being blockable are outlined as: large aspect covers; long channels; large outlet grates; and circulation designs that do not include fully submerged suction outlets. In the United States, if a pool or spa does not employ an unblockable drain, it must include, at a minimum, one of the following safety systems: a safety vacuum-release system (SVRS) as defined in "definitions;" a suction-limiting vent system with a tamper-resistant atmospheric opening; a gravity drainage system that utilizes a collector tank; an automatic pump shut-off system; a device or system that disables the drain or any other system certified by the consumer product safety commission.

== Legal status ==
=== Definitions from EISA ===
There are 7 definitions given under title XIV of EISA 2007.

The following definitions are directly quoted out of EISA 2007:

(1) ASME/ANSI — The term 'ASME/ANSI' as applied to a safety standard means such a standard that is accredited by the American National Standards Institute and published by the American Society of Mechanical Engineers.

(2) Barrier — The term 'barrier' includes a natural or constructed topographical feature that prevents unpermitted access by children to a swimming pool, and, with respect to a hot tub, a lockable cover.

(3) Commission — The term 'Commission' means the Consumer Product Safety Commission.

(4) Main Drain — The term 'main drain' means a submerged suction outlet typically located at the bottom of a pool or spa to conduct water to a recirculating pump.

(5) Safety Vacuum Release System (SVRS) - The term 'safety vacuum release system' means a vacuum release system capable of providing vacuum release at a suction outlet caused by a high vacuum occurrence due to a suction outlet flow blockage.

(6) Swimming Pool; Spa — The term 'swimming pool' or 'spa' means any outdoor or indoor structure intended for swimming or recreational bathing, including in-ground and above-ground structures, and includes hot tubs, spas, portable spas, and non-portable wading pools.

(7) Unblockable Drain — The term 'unblockable drain' means a drain of any size and shape that a human body cannot sufficiently block to create a suction entrapment hazard.

== Sponsors of the bill ==
- House: introduced by Debbie Wasserman Schultz, D-FL
- Senate: introduced by Mark Pryor, D-AR

=== Federal requirements ===
There is a federal requirement for public pools that preempts the state or local law, as of December 19, 2008, and further regulations are in addition to it:

Sec. 1404: Top Priority for Public Pool and Spa Owners/Operators All pool/spa drain covers manufactured, distributed or entered into commerce on or after December 19, 2008, must meet ASME/ANSI A112.19.8– 2007. All public pools and spas must be retrofitted with covers that meet the ASME/ANSI A112.19.8– 2007 standard. All public pools and spas that have a single drain other than an unblockable drain must employ one or more additional options.

=== State requirements ===
A pool contractor should verify that the pool and/or spa is in compliance with the federally mandated Virginia Graeme Baker Pool & Spa Safety Act which takes effect December 19, 2008. If the pool is not in compliance, the necessary steps should be taken to comply with the Act, which, in essence, specifies that:

All public pools and spas, both new and existing, shall be equipped with drain covers compliant with ASME/ANSI A112.19.8 2007 standard.

In addition, all public pools and spas with a single main drain - other than an un-blockable drain - shall also employ one or more of the following devices: separated drain system per ANSI/APSP 7, safety vacuum release system (SVRS) that complies with ANSI/ASME A112.19.17 or ASTM F2387; suction-limiting vent system; gravity drainage system; automatic pump shutoff; drain disablement; equivalent system determined by the CPSC.

The definition of un-blockable drain in the Act is a "drain sump of any size or shape that a human body cannot sufficiently block to create a suction entrapment issue."

Link to the Act: Title XIV—Pool and Spa Safety Act

=== Compliant drain covers ===
The VGBA requires all drain covers to either be manufactured products or to be field fabricated outlets", in each case meeting the specific technical requirements of the act and having the necessary certification.

The PSSA requires a safe and secure connection between the cover and sump. A new, compliant cover that fits securely into a pre-existing sump is accepted under certain conditions.

== SVRS devices ==
These are used in conjunction with an approved main drain cover and skimmer. SVRS are a type of device that are tested to respond to a full vacuum, stopping and releasing a vacuum within 4.5 seconds after a drain is fully blocked. These systems must be tested and certified to be in conformance with ANSI/PSPS/ICC-7-2013 “Manufactured Safety Vacuum Release Systems (SVRS) for Residential and Commercial Swimming Pool, Spa, Hot Tub, and Wading Pool Suction Systems” or ASTM F2387 “Standard Specification for Manufactured Safety Vacuum Release Systems (SVRS) for Swimming Pools, Spas and Hot Tubs.” These standards establish requirements for manufactured SVRS devices: the dimensions and tolerances, materials, installation instructions, testing requirements, and markings and identification. An SVRS can be installed as an independent system or can be incorporated as part of the pool pump.

- Mechanical devices which let air into pump to ease the vacuum when entrapment or blockage is sensed by device.
- Electro-mechanical devices that shut off pump when blockage/entrapment is sensed.
- Pumps or motors with built-in software that shuts off pump when blockage/entrapment is sensed.

== Compliance ==
As of December 19, 2008, it became unlawful to manufacture for sale, offer for sale, distribute in commerce or import into the United States any pool or spa product that is not within conformity to the new pool/spa safety rule, 15 U.S.C. § 2068(a), or the new drain standards, ASME/ANSI A112.19.8.

Any person who knowingly manufactures, sells, distributes or imports a device of noncompliance shall face penalties up to the maximum of $1.825 million. Congress is considering raising this amount to $10 million per offense. Imprisonment is also allowed for this offense, however sentencing term guidelines are not outlined. Criminal and civil penalties could also ensue if any person knowingly does not report the practice of another manufacturing, selling, distributing or importing a noncompliance product.

Pools and spas that are not in operation on December 19, 2008, do not need to meet the new safety standards until they intend to reopen.

== Sources ==
- US Consumer Product Safety Commission (https://www.cpsc.gov/)
- CPSC Enforcement Position
- Presentation on Drowning Prevention, Entrapment Prevention & Pool and Spa Safety Act (pdf)
- CPSC Staff's Guide to Complying with the Law, October 2008 (pdf)
- CPSC Staff Interpretation of Section 1404 of the Virginia Graeme Baker Pool and Spa Safety Act, June 18, 2008 (pdf)
- CPSC Staff Draft Technical Guidance on Section 1406 on Minimum State Requirements for Grant Program* Public Comment Period
- ANSI/APSP-7 Fact Sheet
- ANSI/APSP-7 field checklist for identifying suction entrapment hazards
