= Death of Daniel Wultz =

American Jewish teen killed in a 2006 terrorist attack

Daniel Wultz in Tel Aviv, Israel, shortly before the terrorist attack that claimed his life.

Daniel Wultz (Hebrew: דניאל וולץ) was a Jewish-American teenager and one of 11 people killed in the 2006 Tel Aviv shawarma restaurant bombing at Rosh Ha'ir restaurant in Tel Aviv, Israel. Seventy others were injured. Islamic Jihad claimed responsibility for the attack. On April 17, 2006, around 1:30 pm, a Palestinian suicide bomber approached a crowded restaurant near the old Tel Aviv Central Bus Station. The suicide bomber blew himself up when the security guard stationed at the entrance to the restaurant asked him to open his bag for inspection.

Wultz, 16, a resident of Weston, Florida, was visiting Israel with his family during the Passover holiday when he was caught in the attack. His father, Yekutiel "Tuly" Wultz, was also injured in the bombing. Despite massive wounds and loss of blood, Wultz lived for 27 days after the bombing. A global campaign began shortly after the attack, encouraging people to "Pray for Daniel."

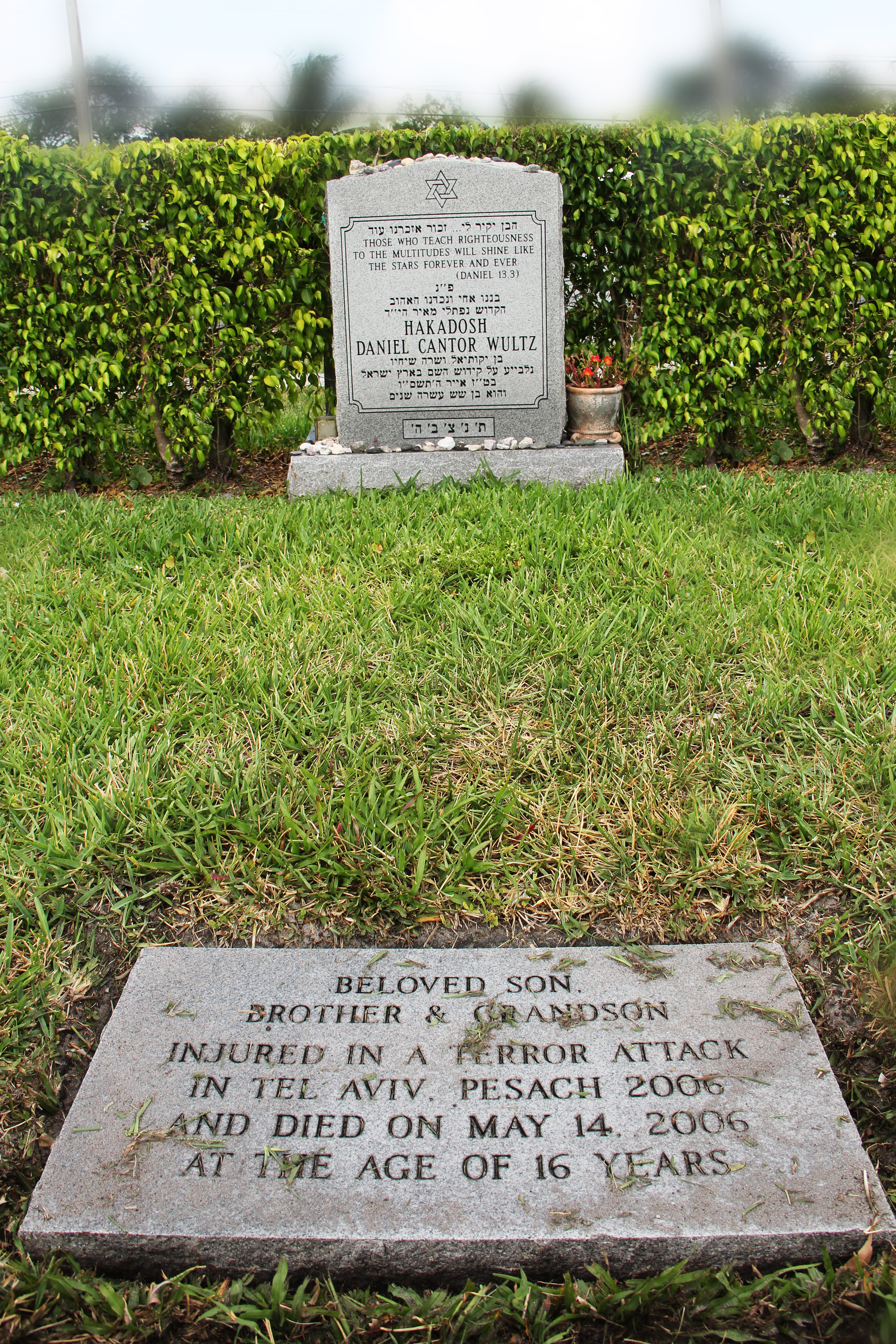
Final resting place of Daniel Wultz in Hollywood, Florida.

Wultz died on May 14, 2006, Mother's Day, in the United States.

His body was returned to south Florida for burial and a funeral at the Weston Chabad synagogue where he was an active member.

== Daniel Cantor Wultz Foundation ==
Shortly after his death, Daniel Wultz's parents, Yekutiel "Tuly" and Sheryl Wultz established the Daniel Cantor Wultz Foundation to promote tolerance through sports and educational activities. The family worked with the Boston-based David Project to create a curriculum for high school students and organized events in the greater Miami area to promote tolerance including programs with the Robert Sheinberg YMCA of Weston where Daniel participated in sports. The foundation remained active through the Wultz family's settlement with Bank of China.

== Cooperation with Simon Wiesenthal Center ==
In cooperation with the Simon Wiesenthal Center, the Wultz family urged the United Nations to designate suicide bombing a crime against humanity.

== Legal actions ==
Encouraged by the government of Israel, the Wultz family filed lawsuits against the governments of Syria, Iran and Bank of China for their role in the death of their son. In support of the Wultz family's actions in U.S. courts, Israeli intelligence sources voluntarily provided the family and their attorneys with specific information on bank accounts used to fund the terror attack, contact between the Islamic Jihad terror cell, organizers and foreign governments, and details of meetings between Israeli intelligence officers and Bank of China officials that took place before the terror attack in an effort to cut off funding to individuals who were receiving money from Bank of China accounts to facilitate terrorist acts against Israeli targets.

In early 2015, U.S. Magistrate Judge Gabriel Gorenstein ordered Bank of China to "turn over some 1,600 documents related to an internal investigation into BOC accounts formerly held in the name of an alleged Islamic Jihad leader, Said al-Shurafa, and his wife Reem." Litigation Daily reported, "Plaintiffs in the six-year-old case hope the documents will buttress their claims that BOC deliberately turned a blind eye to accounts it knew were being used to funnel money to terrorist operatives in Gaza."

=== Judgment against Iran and Syria ===
The family won a case in May 2012 in a U.S. District Court in Washington, D.C., against Iran and Syria for their supporting "Palestinian militants" in this suicide bombing attack. The amount of the judgement was for $323,000,000 and represented the first time a U.S. court issued a judgment against Syria for terror related activities.

In his opinion issued May 14, 2012, Chief Judge Royce C. Lamberth of the U.S. District Court for the District of Columbia wrote, "When a state chooses to use terror as a policy tool—as Iran and Syria continue to do— that state forfeits its sovereign immunity and deserves unadorned condemnation. Barbaric acts like the April 17, 2006 suicide bombing have no place in civilized society and represent a moral depravity that knows no bounds."

=== Separation and settlement of Bank of China terror financing case ===
Based on motions from attorneys representing Bank of China, the U.S. District Court in Washington, D.C., separated the Wultz lawsuit against Bank of China and transferred it to the U.S. District Court in New York. The case was dismissed with prejudice on December 16, 2015, when the Wultz family and Bank of China reached a settlement.

=== Boies, Schiller, Flexner ===
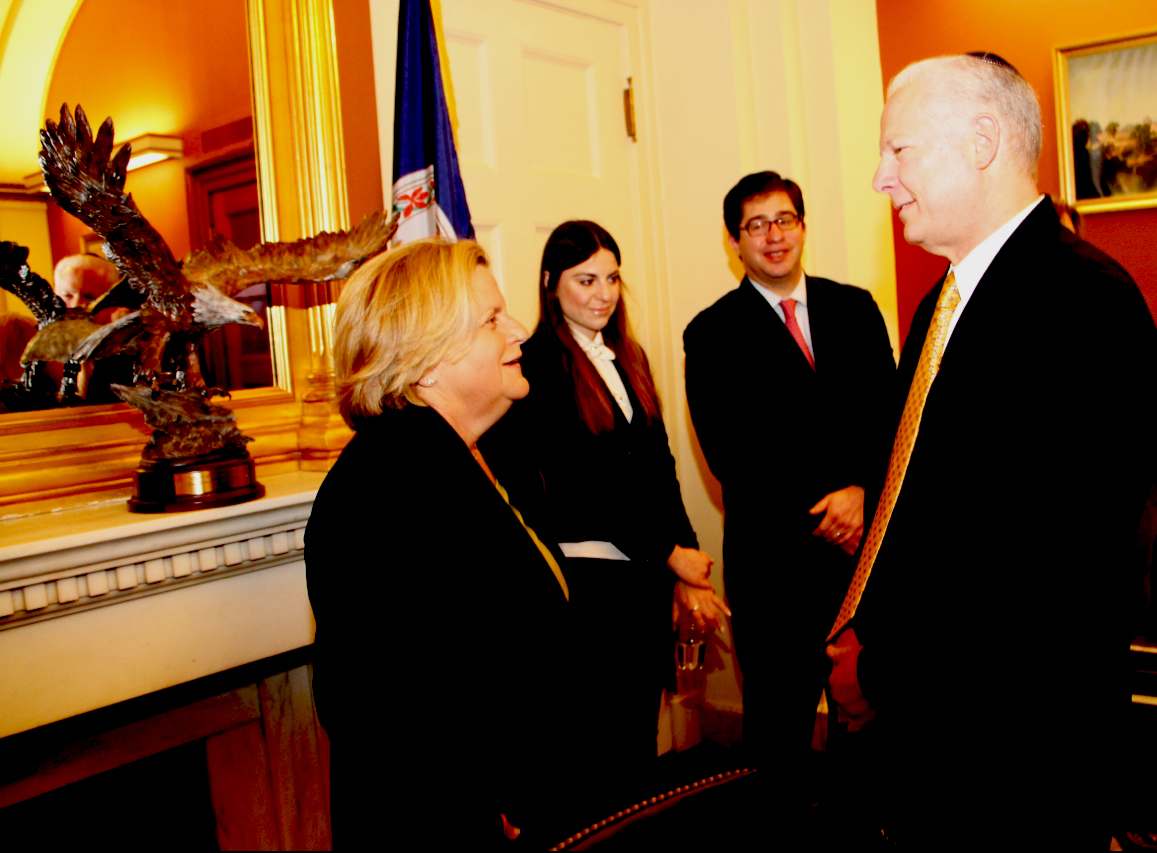
U.S. Representative Ileana Ros-Lehtinen, left, and Tuly Wultz talk in office of former House Majority Leader Eric Cantor during National Day of Prayer event on Capitol Hill, May 1, 2014.

David Boies of Boies, Schiller & Flexner became lead counsel for the Wultz case against Bank of China, which was overseen through settlement by Lee Wolosky, a former director for Transnational Threats on the National Security Council at the White House under Presidents Clinton and George W. Bush.

=== Changing role of Israeli government ===
Although the government of Israel originally provided substantial evidence and encouragement to the Wultz family and their attorneys, starting in May 2013, Israeli officials actively sought to thwart the Wultz case against Bank of China.

According to New York Times columnist Roger Cohen, "After Daniel's death, the Israeli government saw a possible means to close down the money channel through United States courts. It pressed Daniel's parents to file suit, saying it would provide evidence, including a witness named Uzi Shaya who had gone to China dozens of times in his role as an Israeli counterterrorism official, and other support. In the words of Lee Wolosky, a Wultz family lawyer, this was an Israeli operation "to use our courts to achieve a sovereign objective." Because that objective seemed critically important, the Wultzes wanted to cooperate." The Israeli policy change came about at the same time Israeli Prime Minister Benjamin Netanyahu traveled to Beijing for an official state visit to China.

Israeli and American media reported Prime Minister Netanyahu agreed to prevent Israeli officials from continuing to support the American legal action against Bank of China in return for the state visit and potential for increased economic, political and trade cooperation between Israel and China.

While the government of Israel had previously allowed former Mossad agent Uzi Shaya and others with direct knowledge of contacts between Israel and Bank of China to provide evidence and testimony regarding meetings with Bank of China officials, following Netanyahu's reported agreement with Chinese officials, the government of Israel claimed allowing Mr. Shaya to provide the same information through direct testimony in a U.S. Court would jeopardize Israeli national security interests.

In a ruling on the issue, U.S. District Judge Shira Scheindlin agreed to quash a subpoena against the former Israeli intelligence officer, writing: "no evidence suggests that Israel intended to waive Shaya's immunity" regarding information he learned in his official capacity as a Mossad agent. Israeli media called the court's decision a "shocking blow" for the Wultz family's case against Bank of China, reporting, "A US federal court has delivered a major and shocking blow to the case of terror victims' families against the Bank of China, granting Israel's request to block a key former government agent from testifying on behalf of the families' case."

=== Conflict between U.S. and Israel ===
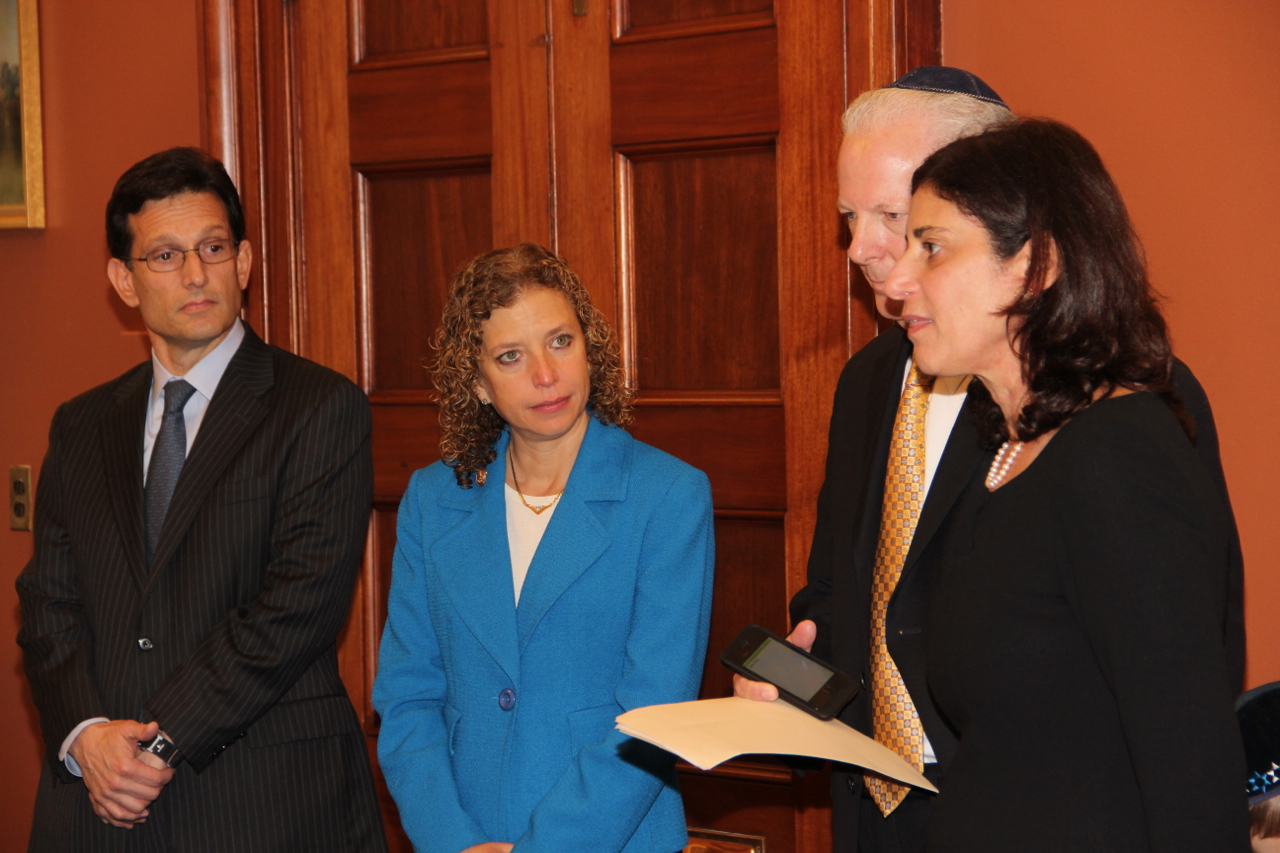
Former House Majority Leader Eric Cantor, left, Rep. Debbie Wasserman Schultz, second from left, listen as Sheryl and Tuly Wultz talk about the impact of prayer in the life of their son, Daniel Wultz on May 1, 2014, in the Office of the House Majority Leader, Washington, D.C.

Leading American lawmakers, such as Ileana Ros-Lehtinen, considered a key longtime supporter of the U.S.-Israel relationship and chair of the House Foreign Affairs Committee that oversees U.S. aid and cooperation with Israel, expressed outrage at Netanyahu's decision to prevent Shaya from testifying in U.S. court, despite his acceptance of a subpoena, and what they considered Israeli efforts to undermine U.S. judicial proceedings.

== National Day of Prayer ==
On May 1, 2014, Republican and Democratic congressional leaders hosted the Wultz family in the office of House Majority Leader Eric Cantor who is Daniel Wultz's cousin, in connection with National Day of Prayer activities. The meeting with Congressman Cantor was co-sponsored by the Wultz family's congressional representative, Congresswoman Debbie Wasserman Schultz, chair of the Democratic National Committee, and attended by Representatives Ileana Ros-Lehtinen, Kay Granger, Eliot Engel, and others.
