= United States lighting energy policy =

U.S. Lighting Energy Policy
- Related laws: Pub.L. 110-140
- Signed into law by: President George W. Bush
- Date signed: December 19, 2007

United States lighting energy policy is moving towards increased efficiency in order to lower greenhouse gas emissions and energy use. Lighting efficiency improvements in the United States can be seen through different standards and acts. The Energy Independence and Security Act of 2007 laid out changes in lighting legislation for the United States. This set up performance standards and the banning of incandescent light bulbs in order to require the use of more efficient fluorescent lighting. EISA 2007 is an effort to increase lighting efficiency by 25-30%. Opposition to EISA 2007 is demonstrated by the Better Use of Light Bulbs Act and the Light Bulb Freedom of Choice Act. The efforts to increase lighting efficiency are also demonstrated by the Energy Star program and the increase efficiency goals by 2011 and 2013. A ban on the manufacture and sale of most general purpose incandescent bulbs in the U.S. took effect on August 1, 2023.

== Incandescent light bulbs ==
As of 2011, incandescent lighting was the most common type used in homes, delivering about 85% of household illumination. To produce light, incandescent light bulbs convert electricity to heat, heating a filament to the point where it glows; a portion of the heat is thus converted to light. The conversion of heat to light requires a filament to be heated to high temperature, typically > 3000 K. Incandescent lamps have a low luminous efficacy, 10-22 lumens per watt, a short average operating life, 750–2500 hours, and a relatively low purchase cost.

The three most common types of incandescent lamps are standard incandescent lamps, tungsten halogen lamps, and reflector lamps. Standard incandescent lamps have an efficacy of 10-17 lumens per watts and a lifetime of 750–2500 hours. Tungsten halogen lamps have an efficacy of 12-22 lumens per watts and a lifetime of 2000–4000 hours. Finally reflector lamps have an efficacy of 12-19 lumens per watts and a lifetime of 2000–3000 hours.

== Compact fluorescent light bulbs ==
Fluorescent lighting converts ultraviolet light to visible light. In order to produce ultraviolet light, electrons flow through the fluorescent lamp and collide with mercury atoms. The collision with mercury causes photons of UV light to be released; the UV light is then converted to visible light as it passes through the phosphor coating in the glass tube.

The conversion process for fluorescent lighting is more efficient than the incandescent process, resulting in 25% of the total energy consumed used to generate light (compared to 5% for incandescent light bulbs) and a 10,000 hour lifetime. The complete compact fluorescent lamp (CFL) includes the Edison screwbase and plastic housing, the electronic ballast, and the fluorescent lamp which is formed into a spiral shape. Improvements in technology have allowed fluorescent lamps with color temperature and color rendition comparable to incandescent lighting.

Compact fluorescent lamps are available in a variety of styles and shapes. Some have tubes and ballasts permanently connected, while others are separate, allowing one to change the tube without changing the ballast. There are also CFLs enclosed in a glass globe, which look similar to conventional incandescent light bulbs. CFLs fit most fixtures designed for incandescent lamps, although only some can be dimmed.

== Light-emitting diodes (LEDs) ==
Light emitting diode (LED) lamps are used for both general and special-purpose lighting. Their advantages over fluorescent bulbs are that they contain no mercury, they turn on instantly at any temperature, their extremely long lifetime is unaffected by cycling on and off, they have no glass to break, and they do not emit UV rays that fade colored materials. LED lamps radiate much less heat than other technologies, and can be either multi-directional or unidirectional, eliminating the need for a mirrored reflector in the bulb or fixture. LED lamps can emit saturated colored light. Disadvantages include spectrum limitations due to discrete emission colors. Their purchase cost has decreased steadily over the years and they are rapidly displacing compact fluorescents in the market.

== Energy Independence and Security Act of 2007 ==
The Energy Independence and Security Act of 2007 (Pub.L. 110-140) laid out the changes in legislation regarding lighting in the United States in Title III, Subtitle B. In this, the different bulbs being affected by the standards changes are first defined. Along with higher standards being created for bulbs, the ballasts are also required to increase efficiency. It is also outlined within EISA 2007 that there are lighting requirements within public buildings. The General Services Administration (GSA) set minimum energy efficiency standards for leased spaces, which includes energy efficient lighting fixtures and bulbs, including the use of Energy Star and Federal Energy Management Program (FEMP) designated products.

=== Incandescent light bulb ban ===
EISA 2007 set new performance requirements for certain common light bulbs, requiring that these bulbs become approximately 25-30% more efficient than the light bulbs of 2008 by 2012–2014. Overall, the intent of this was to bring into the market more efficient light bulbs. Some new incandescent products could be introduced by the effective dates of the law, including a bulb by General Electric that will decrease the amount of energy required. Non-incandescent bulbs, such as compact fluorescent (CFL) and light emitting diodes (LED) already meet the Tier I standards introduced. Some companies worked to stop the sales of incandescent bulbs in anticipation of the standards changes. For example, the home decor and furniture company IKEA phased out the stock and sale of incandescent bulbs at their stores in the US and Canada, starting in August 2011.

=== Defunding of incandescent ban ===
In December 2011, the U.S. Congress defunded enforcement of EISA light-bulb performance requirements as part of the Consolidated Appropriations Act in the 2012 federal budget. However, a representative of the American lighting industry said that "the industry has moved on" and that American manufacturers have already retooled production lines to make other bulbs.

=== Rollback of energy efficiency standards for lightbulbs ===
In September 2019, the Trump administration rolled-back the EISA 2007 energy efficiency standards for lightbulbs with the Energy Department's Federal Register.

== U.S. lighting standards ==
Various codes and programs attempt to characterize U.S. lighting standards. The Energy Policy Act of 2005 (Pub.L. 109-58) provided an energy-efficient commercial building tax reduction program for lighting systems that exceed code lighting. Based on estimates by the U.S. Department of Energy (DOE), lighting represents 40% of the electrical consumption in a commercial building, through the improvement of these systems the DOE believes this could be significantly decreased. The tax deduction includes a portion of installation costs.

The American Society of Heating, Refrigerating and Air-Conditioning Engineers (ASHRAE) provides lighting standards in ASHRAE 90.1-2004. EPAct of 2005 set a deadline for states to adopt the ASHRAE 90.1-2004 standards. ASHRAE has recently published the 90.1-2010 with improved lighting standards; this includes:

- Automatic shutoff control must be met for lighting alterations, including lamp and ballast retrofits when 10+% of connected lighting load is replaced.
- Automatic shutoff is no longer limited to buildings greater than 5,000sq.ft.
- Occupancy sensors are now required.
- Parking garage lighting controls are now required.
- Hotel/motel lighting control has expanded.
- Stairwell lighting must now include a control device that reduces lighting power by 50% when unoccupied.
- All building landscape lighting must be turned off on a schedule or with photosensor.
- Advertising signage lighting must be reduced by 30%.
- Lighting control devices and systems must be functionally tested (this includes occupancy sensors, time switches, programmable schedule controls and photosensors).

Advanced lighting control is an effort made by ASHRAE 90.1-2010 to significantly reduce the energy used for lighting by commercial buildings.

The U.S. Department of Energy is improving residential codes by 30% by 2012, in an effort to move to net zero energy homes by 2020. The International Energy Conservation Code (IECC) embodies the goals of the DOE, increasing efficiency by 15% since its 2006 predecessor. The 2009 IECC requires that 50% of all permanent lamps be high efficacy lighting. The 2009 IECC, chapter 2 defines high efficacy lamps as compact fluorescent lamps, T-8 or smaller diameter linear fluorescent lamps, or lamps with a minimum efficacy of:

- 60 lumens per watt for lamps > 40 watts
- 50 lumens per watt for lamps > 15 watts and ≤ 40 watts
- 40 lumens per watt for lamps < 15 watts

Fourteen states have adopted the 2009 IECC, and six had an effective date set for late 2010 early 2011. Within the next three years, approximately 33 states will have adopted and implemented IECC 2009.

In September 2019 the Trump administration rolled back energy efficiency standards for lightbulbs with the Energy Department's Federal Register filing preventing the January 1, 2020 deadline. It has been argued that filament bulbs provide for a wide spectrum light and bulbs are much cheaper to purchase than CFLs and LEDs. However, they are more expensive than CFLs and LEDs over the life of the bulb due to higher running costs and shorter life.

== Failed legislation ==
In response to the impending ban of incandescent bulbs with increasing standards for light bulbs, there have been multiple bills proposed in opposition to the changes made in the Energy Independence and Security Act of 2007.

=== Better Use of Light Bulbs Act ===
The Better Use of Light Bulbs Act (BULB Act), or H.R. 91 (introduced in the U.S. House of Representatives January 5, 2011), would have repealed provisions from EISA 2007 regarding lighting energy efficiency. There are eight provisions to be repealed by this bill, and include those that: prescribe energy efficiency standards for general service incandescent lamps, rough service lamps, and other designated lamps; direct the Secretary of Energy (DOE) to conduct and report to the Federal Trade Commission (FTC) on an annual assessment of the market for general service lamps and compact fluorescent lamps; direct the Secretary to carry out a proactive national program of consumer awareness, information, and education about lamp labels and energy-efficient lighting choices; prohibit a manufacturer, distributor, retailer, or private labeler from distributing in commerce specified adapters for incandescent lamps; authorize the Secretary to carry out a lighting technology research and development program; set forth minimum energy efficiency standards for incandescent reflector lamps; sets forth requirements for the use of energy efficient lighting fixtures and bulbs in public building construction, alteration, and acquisition, and; require metal-halide lamp fixtures and energy efficiency labeling for designated consumer electronic products to be included within the Energy Policy and Conservation Act's (EPCA) regulatory oversight.

This bill was introduced by Rep. Joe Barton of Texas, with 54 co-sponsors. Upon being introduced, it was referred to the Committee on Energy and Commerce, the Committee on Transportation and Infrastructure, and House Energy and Commerce Committee. Since, it has also been referred to the Subcommittee on Energy and Power and the Subcommittee on Economic Development, Public Buildings and Emergency Management.

On July 12, 2011, H.R. 2417 failed to pass by the required two-thirds majority.

=== Light Bulb Freedom of Choice Act ===
The Light Bulb Freedom of Choice Act, or H.R. 849 (introduced 3/1/2011), also amends provisions from the EISA 2007, but is less restricting than H.R. 91. These provisions concern energy efficiency standards for general service incandescent lamps, rough service lamps, and other designated lamps, as well as incandescent reflector lamps. This bill requires that the Comptroller General present to Congress a report within six months of the Act's enactment. This report would need to include information that proves that: (1) consumers will obtain a net savings in terms of dollars spent on monthly electric bills and expenses for new light fixtures to accommodate the use of the light bulbs required by such provisions, compared to dollars spent before their enactment; (2) the ban of incandescent light bulbs required by such provisions will reduce overall carbon dioxide emissions by 20% in the United States by 2025; and (3) such ban will not pose any health risks, including risks associated with mercury containment in certain light bulbs, to consumers of the general public, including health risks with respect to hospitals, schools, day care centers, mental health facilities, and nursing homes. This report would also include monthly and yearly projections of expenses for electric bills and new light fixtures from January 1, 2012, to December 31, 2017.

Federal legislators, as well as state lawmakers in places like South Carolina, had proposed measures designed to circumvent or overturn the federal lighting performance standards.

This bill was introduced on March 1, 2011, by Rep. Michele Bachmann of Minnesota, along with eight co-sponsors. Upon being introduced, it was referred to the House Committee on Energy and Commerce. On March 8, 2011, it was referred to the Subcommittee on Energy and Power, where it died.

=== H.R. 739 ===
H.R. 739 (introduced on February 16, 2011) amends the EISA 2007 to prohibit any federal or state requirement to increase energy efficient lighting in certain buildings. Any hospital, school, day care center, mental health facility, or nursing home would not be required to install or utilize energy efficient lighting that contains mercury. This bill was introduced to the 112th Congress on February 16, 2011, by Rep. Michael C. Burgess of Texas. This bill was introduced to the Committee on Energy and Commerce, and was referred to the Subcommittee on Energy and Power. It was also referred to the Committee on Transportation and Infrastructure, and was referred to the Subcommittee on Highways and Transit where it died.

=== South Carolina Incandescent Light Bulb Freedom Act ===
H. 3735 (introduced in the South Carolina State House on February 23, 2011, and in the state Senate on April 13, 2011) is sponsored by state Reps. Bill Sandifer and Dwight Loftis. The bill states that if traditional incandescent light bulbs can be made and sold in South Carolina, they are not covered by federal law. The bill has been assigned to the Senate Committee on Labor, Commerce and Industry where it died.

== Energy Star program ==
The Energy Star program adheres to strict energy efficient guidelines which are set by the United States Environmental Protection Agency (EPA). The criteria were based on the lighting industry standards and test procedures. Light fixtures which have earned Energy Star combine quality design with the high energy efficiency.

To qualify for an Energy Star rating, light fixtures must:

- Uses 1/4 the energy of traditional lighting
- Reduced energy bills and bulb replacement
- Lifetime is at least 10,000 hours
- Even light distribution

Those selling Energy Star approved luminaries will be required to participate in quality assurance testing, which uses independent, third-party, qualified testing facilities. Third-party testing provides an active system to verify the quality of Energy Star qualified SSL Luminaire products. Qualified products are selected on a random basis as well as through a nomination process. The manufacturer of each selected luminaire will be required to commission third-party testing, each being tested for: total luminous flux, luminaire efficacy, correlated color temperature, color rendering index, steady state package/module/array temperature, and maximum power supply case. If a product fails quality assurance testing, the entire product grouping is de-listed, if two or more variations of a product qualified under a product grouping fail, the applicant is place on a probationary list. The DOE reserves the right to terminate any partnership agreements with a manufacturer whose products repeatedly violate the ENERGY STAR specifications.

The EPA announced updated standards for lighting fixtures to qualify for Energy Star labels. The next standards will be effective October 1, 2011, light fixtures will need to increase efficiency 30 percent about currently qualified fluorescent-based fixtures. In 2013, performance requirements will increase further, requiring 40 percent higher efficiency. The fixtures will continue to meet the strict performance; ensuring high quality light output as well as reduced toxins in fixture materials. A range of options will qualify under the new requirements, including fluorescent and LED lighting.

== See also ==
- Incandescent light bulb ban
