= Pool suction-drain injury =

Injury due to suction entrapment

Pool suction-drain injury, also known as suction entrapment, occurs when the drain of a wading pool, swimming pool, hot tub, or fountain sucks in a swimmer's jewelry, torso, limbs, hair or buttocks. In some cases of buttocks entrapment, victims are disemboweled. In the United States, 147 incidents were documented between 1985 and 2002 of which 36 were fatal. In 1982, the Consumer Product Safety Commission reported that five children were disemboweled by drains in wading pools and urged pools to install covers on drains.

A standard 8 inches (20 cm) main drain can develop up to 350 pounds (160 kg) of force, which could hold a person underwater in tight grip until the suction is released. This can drown the entrapped person, despite the rescue efforts of multiple adults.

One way to make drains safer is to install shut-off valves and dome-shaped drains that are less likely to create a suction effect with the human body, as required in the United States by the 2007 Virginia Graeme Baker Pool and Spa Safety Act.

== Notable cases ==
=== United States ===
Name	Date	Incident
Carol Parker	1957	A 13-year-old in Prattville, Alabama was sucked feet-first to her hips into a drain of a municipal pool and remained stuck under nine feet of water despite two lifeguards' efforts. She was able to escape the drain when a pool bystander turned off the pump. She lived a normal life afterwards as a well-regarded member of her community before being murdered in 2016 in an unrelated incident.
Valerie Lakey	1993	In Cary, North Carolina, 5-year-old Valerie Lakey was disemboweled by a kiddie pool when her buttocks became stuck to the drain. Neither turning off the pump nor the strength of four adults dislodged her. The drain cover manufacturer, Sta-Rite, claimed the cover was improperly installed. Lakey survived without most of her small and large intestine and received a $30.9 million settlement from Sta-Rite ($25 million), Wake County, Medfield Area Recreation Club, and others ($5.9 million combined). It was the largest personal injury verdict in North Carolina history and a landmark case of lawyer John Edwards, later a Senator and vice presidential nominee.
Virginia Graeme Baker	June 2002	The seven-year-old granddaughter of former US Secretary of State James Baker died of suction entrapment due to a faulty drain cover and died in her mother's arms at the bottom of a hot tub. The United States Congress passed a pool safety act under her name in 2007.
Abigail Taylor	2007	The six-year-old died in 2008 nine months after her injury despite subsequent surgeries. Scott and Katey Taylor, her parents, lobbied for the Virginia Graeme Baker Pool and Spa Safety Act, which was passed the year of Abigail's injury.
Salma Bashir	2008	During a holiday with her family, she was disemboweled while in the children's swimming pool. As of the time of the report, she was fed by a TPN bag and was waiting for a multiple organ transplant. After getting a small intestine transplant, her body rejected the organ and six months later it was removed, as was her large intestine and gall bladder. She ultimately passed away in January 2024.
Evan Pappas	2018	Survived an entrapment of 7 minutes 40 seconds in a lazy river in South Carolina in 2018.

== In popular culture ==
In the 2009 film The Final Destination, character Hunt Wynorski becomes trapped by the suction of a swimming pool drain after diving underwater to retrieve a coin. The drain's suction holds him against the outlet, ultimately causing fatal disembowelment.

Pool-drain suction injuries are also referenced in "Guts", a short story by Chuck Palahniuk originally published in the 2004 collection Haunted. The story includes a graphic scene in which a boy suffers catastrophic internal injuries after becoming trapped by the suction of a swimming pool drain while underwater. The story became notorious for causing audience members to faint during public readings by Palahniuk.
