= 1st Rosh Ha'ir restaurant bombing =

2006 Palestinian suicide attack against civilians in Tel Aviv, Israel

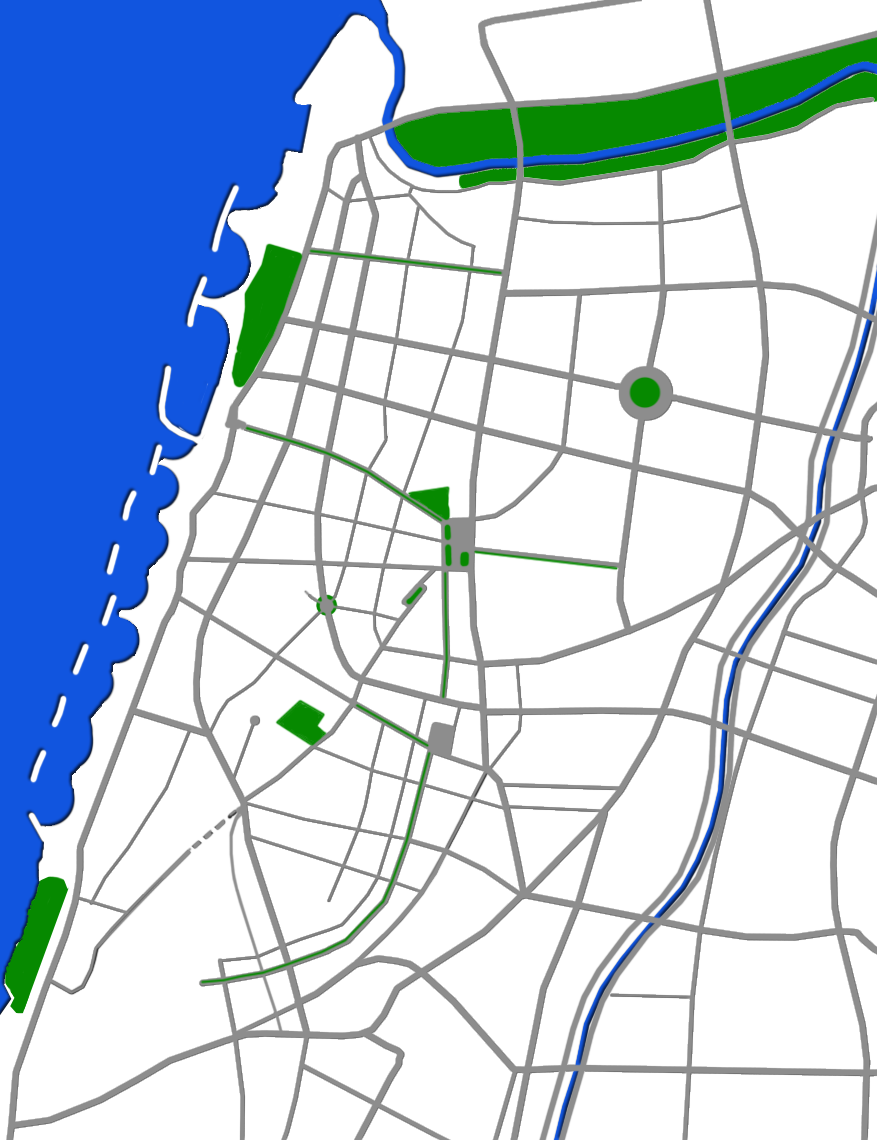
- Native name: הפיגוע בדוכן השווארמה ראש העיר
- Location: 32°3′35″N 34°46′42″E; Tel Aviv, Israel
- Date: 19 January 2006; 20 years ago 15:50 pm (UTC+2)
- Attack type: Suicide attack
- Weapon: Explosive device
- Deaths: 0 civilians (+1 bomber)
- Injuries: 32 civilians
- Perpetrator: Islamic Jihad claimed responsibility
- No. of participants: 1

The 1st Rosh Ha'ir restaurant bombing was a suicide bombing on January 19, 2006, at Rosh Ha'ir shawarma restaurant in Tel Aviv, Israel. Thirty two Israeli civilians were injured. The Palestinian militant organization Islamic Jihad claimed responsibility for the terror attack.

A second suicide bombing targeted the same restaurant on April 17 of the same year, killing 11 Israeli civilians and injuring 68.

== Perpetrators ==
The Palestinian Islamic Jihad claimed responsibility for the attack and identified the bomber as Sami Abd al-Hafiz Antar from Nablus. The al-Aqsa Martyrs Brigade also claimed responsibility for the bombing.

== See also ==
- 2nd Rosh Ha'ir restaurant bombing
