= High-performance buildings =

Buildings which are better for the environment that regulations require

High-performance buildings are those which deliver a relatively higher level of energy efficiency performance or greenhouse gas reduction than what is required by building codes or other regulations. Architects, designers, and builders typically design and build high-performance buildings using a range of established strategies, techniques, tools, and materials to ensure that, upon completion, the building will consume a minimal amount of energy for heating, cooling, illumination, and ventilation during operation.

== Occupant benefits ==
Those living or working in high-performance buildings enjoy a range of benefits when compared with traditional, less-efficient buildings. Documented benefits include:

- Lower energy bills. Lower energy consumption reduces operating costs and helps shield owners or managers from future increases in energy prices.
- Healthier living. High performance homes are designed for improved indoor air quality. They often include active ventilation, and use materials and finishes with lower amounts of volatile organic compounds (VOCs).
- Greater thermal comfort. Occupants will feel more comfortable at equivalent indoor temperatures relative to traditional buildings, due to reduced drafts and temperature variations in the building.
- Reduced pollution and CO_{2} emissions. High performance buildings consume dramatically less energy in operation, which can significantly lower greenhouse gas (GHG) emissions if the building burns natural gas for space and water heating.
- Natural light. High performance buildings maximize effective use of daylight, which can provide a more pleasing indoor environment while reducing utility costs.
- Increased resale value. Many homebuyers are looking for energy-efficient homes, which can typically be sold more quickly and for more money than conventional homes.
- Reduced noise levels. The increased insulation levels and better windows found in a high performance building can reduce sound transmission from outside.
- Higher resilience. High levels of insulation, combined with passive design, can help maintain comfortable indoor temperatures longer than conventional homes during power outages or summer heat events.

A 2012 study by the American Council for an Energy-Efficient Economy found that multifamily buildings present a tremendous opportunity for energy savings. Comprehensive, cost-effective upgrades in multifamily buildings could improve efficiency by 15-30%, the Council found, representing an annual sector-wide savings of almost US$3.4 billion.

== Climate benefits ==
Globally, buildings constitute a leading consumer of energy and a significant source of greenhouse gas emissions. In 2010, buildings accounted for 32% of total global final energy use, 19% of energy-related GHG emissions, including emissions produced in the production of electricity that is used by buildings. In the United States in 2016, carbon emissions from homes and commercial businesses contributed 6,511 million metric tons of CO_{2} equivalent to the atmosphere, or 11 percent of the nation's total.

Governments with jurisdiction over building codes and standards and that are interested in reducing the climate impact of buildings may seek to reduce these emissions by either incentivizing requiring higher levels of energy efficiency performance in new homes and other buildings.

== All-Electric Buildings ==
High-performance buildings use less energy than their conventional counterparts. For buildings that burn natural gas for spaced and water heating, improved energy efficiency can yield corresponding reductions in greenhouse gas emissions.

Those building high-performance buildings, or renovating an existing building for improved energy and climate performance, often seek to reduce greenhouse gas emissions by using a low carbon energy system such an electric heat pump instead of a natural gas furnace or hot water heater. In the United States, a growing movement is seeking to "electrify everything," including buildings. As of mid-2021, at least 45 U.S. cities have to date passed "all electric" ordinances that either mandate or incentivize all-electric new construction.
