= 2nd Rosh Ha'ir restaurant bombing =

2006 Palestinian suicide attack against civilians in Tel Aviv, Israel

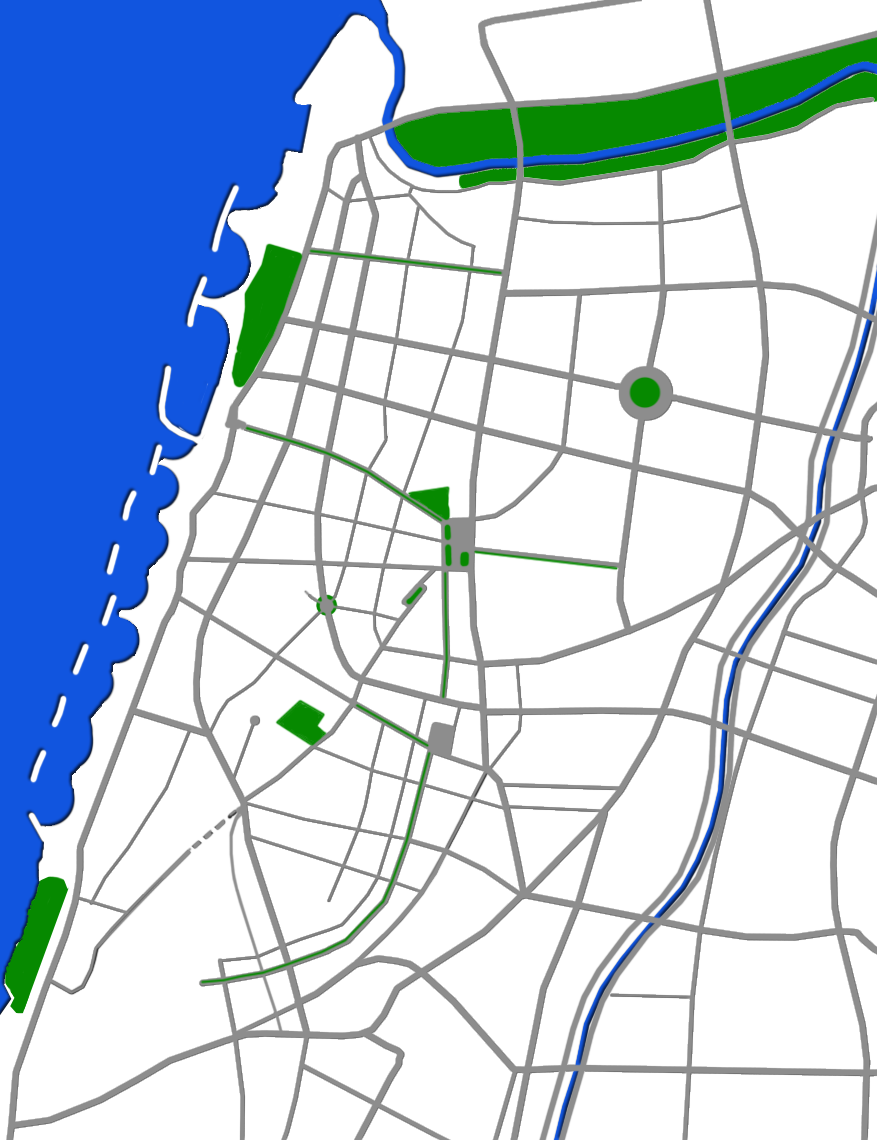
- Native name: הפיגוע בדוכן השווארמה ראש העיר
- Location: 32°3′35″N 34°46′42″E; Tel Aviv, Israel
- Date: 17 April 2006; 20 years ago 13:30 pm (UTC+2)
- Attack type: Suicide attack
- Weapon: 5 kilograms (11 lb) explosive device
- Deaths: 11 civilians (+1 bomber)
- Injuries: 70 civilians
- Perpetrators: Palestinian Islamic Jihad claimed responsibility; Syria held responsible by U.S.
- No. of participants: 1

The 2nd Rosh Ha'ir restaurant bombing was a Palestinian suicide bombing on 17 April 2006 at Rosh Ha'ir shawarma restaurant in Tel Aviv, Israel. Eleven Israeli civilians were killed in the attack and 70 were injured, in the deadliest attack in Israel in nearly two years.

The Palestinian militant organization Islamic Jihad claimed responsibility for the terror attack, the seventh suicide bombing in Israel since Palestinian groups had agreed to a ceasefire in February 2005.

The attack was the second suicide bombing at the Rosh Ha'ir restaurant in 2006. The previous attack, on 19 January 2006, injured 31 people.

== Attack ==
On April 17, 2006, Sami Salim Mohammed Hammed, a Palestinian student from Jenin, conducted a suicide attack using 5 kilograms (11 lb) of explosives in a bag filled with nails and metal shards at the Rosh Ha'ir shawarma restaurant near the Tel Aviv Central Bus Station. At the time, the restaurant was crowded for lunch. The blast killed 11 civilians and injured more than 60. It was the deadliest attack in Israel in two years.

== Perpetrators ==
The Palestinian Islamic Jihad claimed responsibility for the attack and identified the bomber as Sami Salim Hamad from near Jenin in northern West Bank. According to the Guardian, an Islamic Jihad cell had conducted six of the seven previous suicide bombings in Israel since Palestinian groups had agreed to a ceasefire in February 2005.

== Reactions ==
- Israel: Israeli Foreign Ministry spokesman Gideon Meir stated that Israel held Hamas responsible for the attacks, accusing the Hamas of "giving support to all the other terrorist organizations".
- State of Palestine: Mahmoud Abbas, President of the Palestinian Authority said violence was against Palestinian interests and urged the international community to encourage peace negotiations.
- Hamas: Khaled Abu Helal, spokesman for the Hamas-led Interior Ministry, called the attack "a direct result of the policy of the occupation and the brutal aggression and siege committed against our people."
- United States: The Bush administration strongly criticized the attacks, calling it "a despicable act of terror for which there is no excuse or justification."

== Aftermath ==
Islamic Jihad leader Elias Ashkar, whom Israel accused of being behind the attack, was killed on 14 May 2006 by Israeli troops in the village of Qabatiya, along with four other Palestinians.

The family of Daniel Wultz won a case in May 2012 in a U.S. District Court against Iran and Syria for their supporting "Palestinian militants" in this suicide bombing attack. The amount of the judgement was for $323,000,000 and represented the first time that a U.S. court issued a judgment against Syria for terror related activities.

== See also ==
- 2002 Herzliya bombing
