= 2016 United States House of Representatives elections in Florida =

- November 8, 2016

All 27 Florida seats to the United States House of Representatives
| | Majority party | Minority party |
|---|---|---|
| Party | Republican | Democratic |
| Last election | 17 | 10 |
| Seats won | 16 | 11 |
| Seat change | ▼1 | ▲1 |
| Popular vote | 4,733,630 | 3,985,050 |
| Percentage | 54.71% | 45.21% |
| Swing | ▼1.31% | ▲1.23% |

Republican
40–50%
50–60%
60–70%
70–80%
80–90%
Democratic
50–60%
60–70%
70–80%
80–90%
90–100%

The 2016 United States House of Representatives elections in Florida were held on Tuesday, November 8, 2016, to elect the 27 U.S. representatives from the state of Florida, one from each of the state's 27 congressional districts. The elections coincided with the elections of other federal and state offices, including President of the United States.

A lawsuit challenging the districts under Florida's Congressional District Boundaries Amendment (Fair Districts Amendment) was filed in 2012 and was resolved in 2015. The results of the lawsuit had major repercussions on the congressional races in Florida in 2016. The primaries were held on August 30.

== Redistricting lawsuit ==
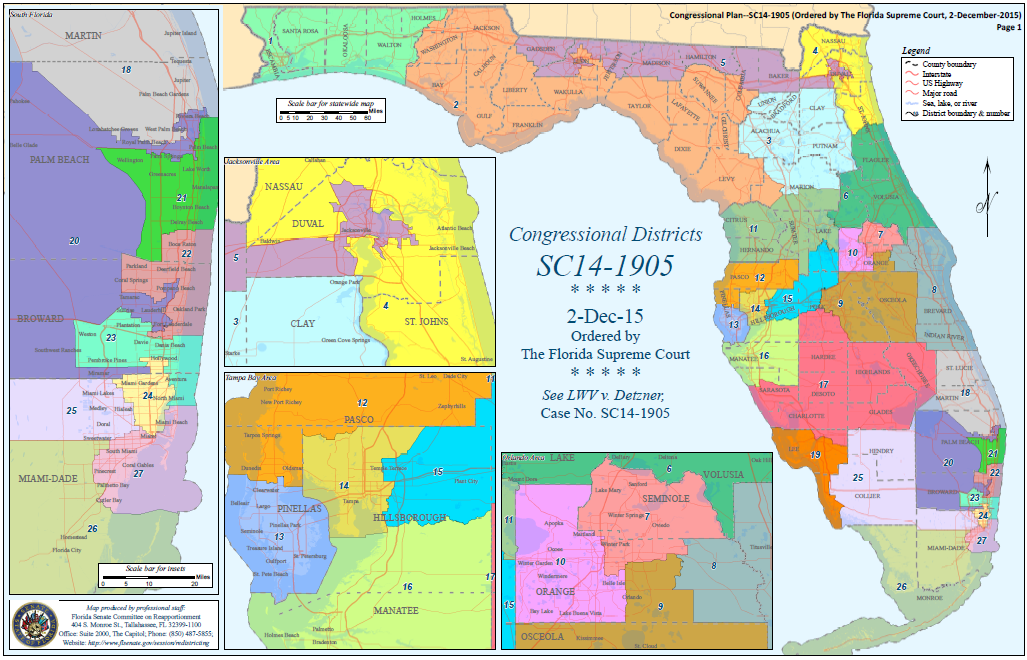
This image shows the 2016–2020 court-ordered FL Congressional districts.

In 2014, Circuit Court Judge Terry Lewis threw out the congressional map for violating Florida's 2010 Amendment 6 to the state Constitution, commonly called the Fair Districts Amendment. The ruling specifically applied to FL-5 and FL-10. Subsequent rulings by higher courts and concluding in the Supreme Court of Florida also struck down FL-13, FL-21, FL-22 and FL-26, which also necessitated redraws of varying scale to the districts surrounding them.

== Results summary ==
=== Statewide ===
| Party | Candidates | Votes | | Seats | | |
| Party | Candidates | No. | % | No. | +/– | % |
|---|---|---|---|---|---|---|
| Republican | 26 | 4,733,630 | 54.71% | 16 | ▼1 | 59.26% |
| Democratic | 27 | 3,985,050 | 45.21% | 11 | ▲1 | 40.74% |
| Independent | 10 | 109,166 | 1.24% | 0 | Steady | 0.00% |
| Libertarian | 1 | 9,395 | 0.11% | 0 | Steady | 0.00% |
| Write-in | 6 | 185 | 0.00% | 0 | Steady | 0.00% |
| Total | | 8,837,426 | 100.0% | 27 | Steady | 100.0% |

=== District ===
Results of the 2016 United States House of Representatives elections in Florida by district:

| District | Republican | | Democratic | | Others | | Total | | Result |
| District | Votes | % | Votes | % | Votes | % | Votes | % | Result |
|---|---|---|---|---|---|---|---|---|---|
| District 1 | 255,107 | 69.10% | 114,079 | 30.90% | 0 | 0.00% | 369,186 | 100.0% | Republican hold |
| District 2 | 231,163 | 67.32% | 102,801 | 29.94% | 9,398 | 2.74% | 343,362 | 100.0% | Republican gain |
| District 3 | 193,843 | 56.56% | 136,338 | 39.78% | 12,519 | 3.65% | 342,700 | 100.0% | Republican hold |
| District 4 | 287,509 | 70.18% | 113,088 | 27.61% | 9,065 | 2.21% | 409,662 | 100.0% | Republican hold |
| District 5 | 108,325 | 35.77% | 194,549 | 64.23% | 0 | 0.00% | 302,874 | 100.0% | Democratic hold |
| District 6 | 213,519 | 58.57% | 151,051 | 41.43% | 0 | 0.00% | 364,570 | 100.0% | Republican hold |
| District 7 | 171,583 | 48.52% | 182,039 | 51.47% | 33 | 0.01% | 353,655 | 100.0% | Democratic gain |
| District 8 | 246,483 | 63.11% | 127,127 | 32.55% | 16,951 | 4.34% | 390,561 | 100.0% | Republican hold |
| District 9 | 144,450 | 42.52% | 195,311 | 57.48% | 0 | 0.00% | 339,761 | 100.0% | Democratic hold |
| District 10 | 107,498 | 35.13% | 198,491 | 64.87% | 0 | 0.00% | 305,989 | 100.0% | Democratic gain |
| District 11 | 258,016 | 65.37% | 124,713 | 31.60% | 11,990 | 3.04% | 394,719 | 100.0% | Republican hold |
| District 12 | 253,559 | 68.59% | 116,110 | 31.41% | 0 | 0.00% | 369,669 | 100.0% | Republican hold |
| District 13 | 171,149 | 48.10% | 184,693 | 51.90% | 0 | 0.00% | 355,842 | 100.0% | Democratic gain |
| District 14 | 121,088 | 38.21% | 195,789 | 61.79% | 0 | 0.00% | 316,877 | 100.0% | Democratic hold |
| District 15 | 182,999 | 57.46% | 135,475 | 42.54% | 0 | 0.00% | 318,474 | 100.0% | Republican hold |
| District 16 | 230,654 | 59.77% | 155,262 | 40.23% | 0 | 0.00% | 385,916 | 100.0% | Republican hold |
| District 17 | 209,348 | 61.81% | 115,974 | 34.24% | 13,353 | 3.94% | 338,675 | 100.0% | Republican hold |
| District 18 | 201,488 | 53.60% | 161,918 | 43.07% | 12,503 | 3.33% | 375,927 | 100.0% | Republican gain |
| District 19 | 239,225 | 65.87% | 123,812 | 34.09% | 129 | 0.04% | 363,166 | 100.0% | Republican hold |
| District 20 | 54,646 | 19.69% | 222,914 | 80.31% | 0 | 0.00% | 277,560 | 100.0% | Democratic hold |
| District 21 | 118,038 | 35.14% | 210,606 | 62.71% | 7,217 | 2.15% | 335,861 | 100.0% | Democratic hold |
| District 22 | 138,737 | 41.06% | 199,113 | 58.94% | 0 | 0.00% | 337,850 | 100.0% | Democratic hold |
| District 23 | 130,818 | 40.49% | 183,225 | 56.70% | 9,077 | 2.81% | 323,120 | 100.0% | Democratic hold |
| District 24 | – | – | – | – | – | – | – | – | Democratic hold |
| District 25 | 157,921 | 62.36% | 95,319 | 37.64% | 0 | 0.00% | 253,240 | 100.0% | Republican hold |
| District 26 | 148,547 | 52.95% | 115,493 | 41.17% | 16,502 | 5.88% | 280,542 | 100.0% | Republican hold |
| District 27 | 157,917 | 56.29% | 129,760 | 46.25% | 0 | 0.00% | 280,542 | 100.0% | Republican hold |
| Total | 4,733,630 | 53.61% | 3,985,050 | 45.13% | 118,737 | 1.34% | 8,837,426 | 100.0% | |

== District 1 ==
2016 Florida's 1st congressional district election
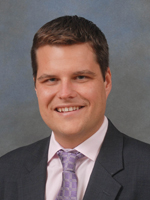

| Nominee | Matt Gaetz | Stephen Specht |
| Party | Republican | Democratic |
| Popular vote | 255,107 | 114,079 |
| Percentage | 69.1% | 30.9% |
- County results Gaetz: 60–70% 70–80% 80–90%
U.S. Representative before election
Jeff Miller
Republican
Elected U.S. Representative
Matt Gaetz
Republican

Republican Jeff Miller had represented the district since being elected in 2001. He considered running for the U.S. Senate. On July 30, 2015, Miller decided not to run for the open Senate seat and announced he would run for reelection. In March 2016, Miller announced he would not run for reelection.

=== Republican primary ===
State Senator Greg Evers had expressed his interest in running for this seat if Miller had run for the Senate.

==== Candidates ====
===== Nominee =====
- Matt Gaetz, state representative

===== Eliminated in primary =====
- Rebekah Johansen Bydlak, activist
- Cris Dosev, retired U.S. Marine officer and real estate developer
- Greg Evers, state senator
- Brian Frazier, retired U.S. Navy officer
- Rich Gazlay, businessman
- Mark Wichern, business consultant
- James Zumwalt, retired U.S. Navy officer and grandson of Elmo Zumwalt

===== Withdrawn =====
- Gary Fairchild
- John Mills, retired U.S. Navy pilot

===== Declined =====
- Jeff Miller, incumbent U.S. Representative

==== Endorsements ====
Rebekah Johansen Bydlak

U.S. Representatives

- Ron Paul, former U.S. Representative and candidate for President in 2008 and 2012

Organizations

- Republican Liberty Caucus
Cris Dosev

Organizations

- Combat Veterans for Congress
- Eagle Forum
- Special Operations Speaks

Individuals

- James T. Conway, former Commandant of the Marine Corps
- Phyllis Schlafly
Matt Gaetz

Statewide officials

- Mike Huckabee, former Governor of Arkansas and presidential candidate

==== Polling ====
| Poll source | Date(s) administered | Sample size | Margin of error | Cris Dosev | Greg Evers | Brian Fraizer | Matt Gaetz | Mark Wichern | Undecided |
|---|---|---|---|---|---|---|---|---|---|
| Citizens for a Just Government | March 24–25, 2016 | 436 | ± 4.3% | 1% | 23% | 3% | 13% | 1% | 58% |
| Citizens for a Just Government | March 24–25, 2016 | 436 | ± 4.3% | — | 25% | — | 15% | — | 60% |

==== Results ====
In the August 30 primary, Matt Gaetz defeated his six rivals for the nomination.

Republican primary results
| Party | Candidate | Votes | % |
|---|---|---|---|
| Republican | Matt Gaetz | 35,689 | 36.1 |
| Republican | Greg Evers | 21,540 | 21.8 |
| Republican | Cris Dosev | 20,610 | 20.9 |
| Republican | Rebekah Johansen Bydlak | 7,689 | 7.8 |
| Republican | James Zumwalt | 7,660 | 7.7 |
| Republican | Brian Frazier | 3,817 | 3.9 |
| Republican | Mark Wichern | 1,798 | 1.8 |
| Total votes | | 98,803 | 100.0 |

=== Democratic primary ===
==== Candidates ====
===== Nominee =====
- Steven Specht, law student and former air force intelligence officer

===== Withdrawn =====
- Amanda Kondrat'yev, Public Relations Officer at the University of West Florida

=== General election ===
==== Predictions ====
| Source | Ranking | As of |
|---|---|---|
| The Cook Political Report | Safe R | November 7, 2016 |
| Daily Kos Elections | Safe R | November 7, 2016 |
| Rothenberg | Safe R | November 3, 2016 |
| Sabato's Crystal Ball | Safe R | November 7, 2016 |
| RCP | Safe R | October 31, 2016 |

==== Results ====
Florida’s 1st congressional district, 2016
| Party | Candidate | Votes | % |
|---|---|---|---|
| Republican | Matt Gaetz | 255,107 | 69.1 |
| Democratic | Steven Specht | 114,079 | 30.9 |
| Total votes | | 369,186 | 100.0 |
| Republican hold | | | |

== District 2 ==
2016 Florida's 2nd congressional district election
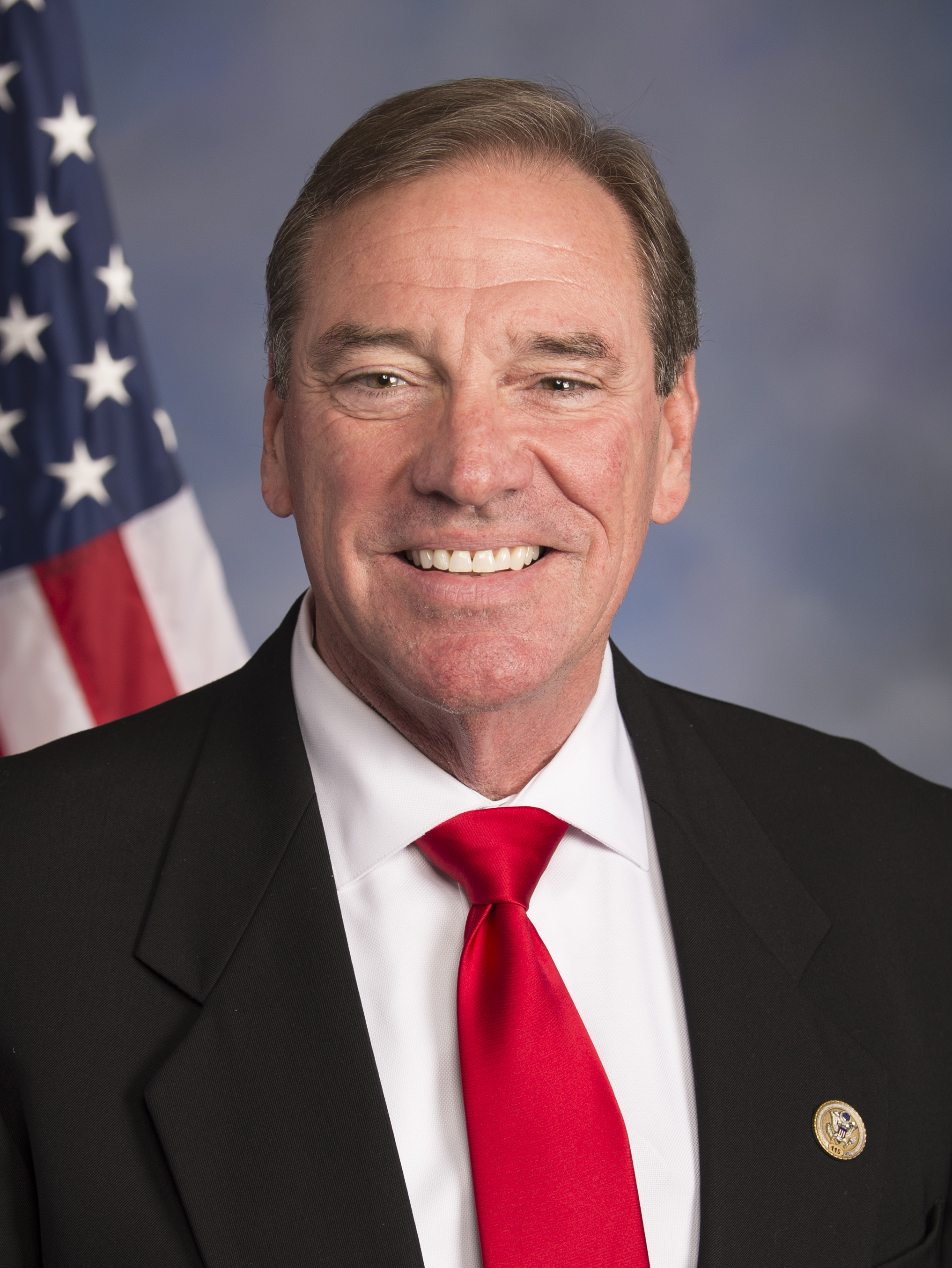

| Nominee | Neal Dunn | Walter Dartland |
| Party | Republican | Democratic |
| Popular vote | 231,163 | 102,801 |
| Percentage | 67.3% | 30.0% |
- County results Dunn: 50–60% 60–70% 70–80% 80–90%
U.S. Representative before election
Gwen Graham
Democratic
Elected U.S. Representative
Neal Dunn
Republican

Redistricting significantly altered the 2nd, mainly by shifting most of Tallahassee's African American residents to the 5th District. On paper, this made the 2nd heavily Republican. Democrat Gwen Graham represented the district for one term after being elected in 2014, when she beat Republican incumbent Steve Southerland. She did not run for re-election.

=== Democratic primary ===
==== Candidates ====
===== Nominee =====
- Walter Dartland, former deputy attorney general

===== Eliminated in primary =====
- Steve Crapps, tree farmer

===== Declined =====
- Gwen Graham, incumbent U.S. Representative
- Michelle Rehwinkel Vasilinda, state representative

==== Results ====
The primary results were too close to call as of September 1, 2016.

Democratic primary results
| Party | Candidate | Votes | % |
|---|---|---|---|
| Democratic | Walter Dartland | 30,115 | 50.1 |
| Democratic | Steve Crapps | 29,982 | 49.9 |
| Total votes | | 60,097 | 100.0 |

=== Republican primary ===
==== Candidates ====
===== Nominee =====
- Neal Dunn, urologist

===== Eliminated in primary =====
- Ken Sukhia, former United States Attorney for the Northern District of Florida
- Mary Thomas, general counsel for the Florida Department of Elder Affairs

===== Withdrawn =====
- Jeff Moran, custom car business owner and retired police officer (endorsed Sukhia)

===== Declined =====
- Marti Coley, state representative
- Matt Gaetz, state representative (running for FL-01)
- Steve Southerland, former U.S. Representative
- Pete Williams, attorney, former statewide prosecutor, and nominee for Leon County State Attorney in 2012

==== Endorsements ====
Neal Dunn

U.S. Representatives

- Steve Southerland, former U.S. Representative

State legislators

- Dennis K. Baxley, state representative
- Allan Bense, former Speaker
- Don Gaetz, former Senate President
- Elizabeth W. Porter, state representative
- Jay Trumbull, state representative
- Will Weatherford, former Speaker
Ken Sukhia

U.S. Senators

- Jeff Sessions, current U.S. Senator from Alabama

U.S. Representatives

- Bill Grant, former U.S. Representative and nominee for U.S. Senate in 1992
Mary Thomas

State legislators

- Mike Hill, state representative
- Jimmie Todd Smith, state representative
- Charlie Stone, state representative
- Charles Van Zant, state representative

Organizations

- Asian American Hotel Owners Association
- Club for Growth
- Maggie's List
- Senate Conservatives Fund
- Tea Party Express

==== Debates ====
2016 Florida's 2nd congressional district republican primary debates
| No. | Date | Host | Moderator | Link | Republican | Republican | Republican | Republican |
| Key: P Participant A Absent N Not invited I Invited W Withdrawn | | | | | | | | |
| Key: P Participant A Absent N Not invited I Invited W Withdrawn | | | | | Neal Dunn | Jeff Moran | Ken Sukhia | Mary Thomas |
|---|---|---|---|---|---|---|---|---|
| 1 | May 12, 2016 | Florida Family; Policy Council | Preston Scott | YouTube | P | P | P | P |
| 2 | Jun. 13, 2016 | | | YouTube (Part 1); YouTube (Part 2) | P | P | P | P |

==== Results ====
Dunn won the primary on August 30, 2016.

Republican primary results
| Party | Candidate | Votes | % |
|---|---|---|---|
| Republican | Neal Dunn | 33,886 | 41.4 |
| Republican | Mary Thomas | 32,178 | 39.3 |
| Republican | Ken Sukhia | 15,826 | 19.3 |
| Total votes | | 81,890 | 100.0 |

=== Libertarian primary ===
==== Candidates ====
===== Nominee =====
- Rob Lapham, retired IT executive

=== General election ===
==== Predictions ====
| Source | Ranking | As of |
|---|---|---|
| The Cook Political Report | Likely R (flip) | November 7, 2016 |
| Daily Kos Elections | Safe R (flip) | November 7, 2016 |
| Rothenberg | Safe R (flip) | November 3, 2016 |
| Sabato's Crystal Ball | Safe R (flip) | November 7, 2016 |
| RCP | Likely R (flip) | October 31, 2016 |

==== Results ====
Florida’s 2nd congressional district, 2016
| Party | Candidate | Votes | % |
|---|---|---|---|
| Republican | Neal Dunn | 231,163 | 67.3 |
| Democratic | Walter Dartland | 102,801 | 30.0 |
| Libertarian | Rob Lapham | 9,395 | 2.7 |
| Independent | Angela Marie Walls-Windhauser (write-in) | 3 | 0.0 |
| Total votes | | 343,362 | 100.0 |
| Republican gain from Democratic | | | |

== District 3 ==
2016 Florida's 3rd congressional district election
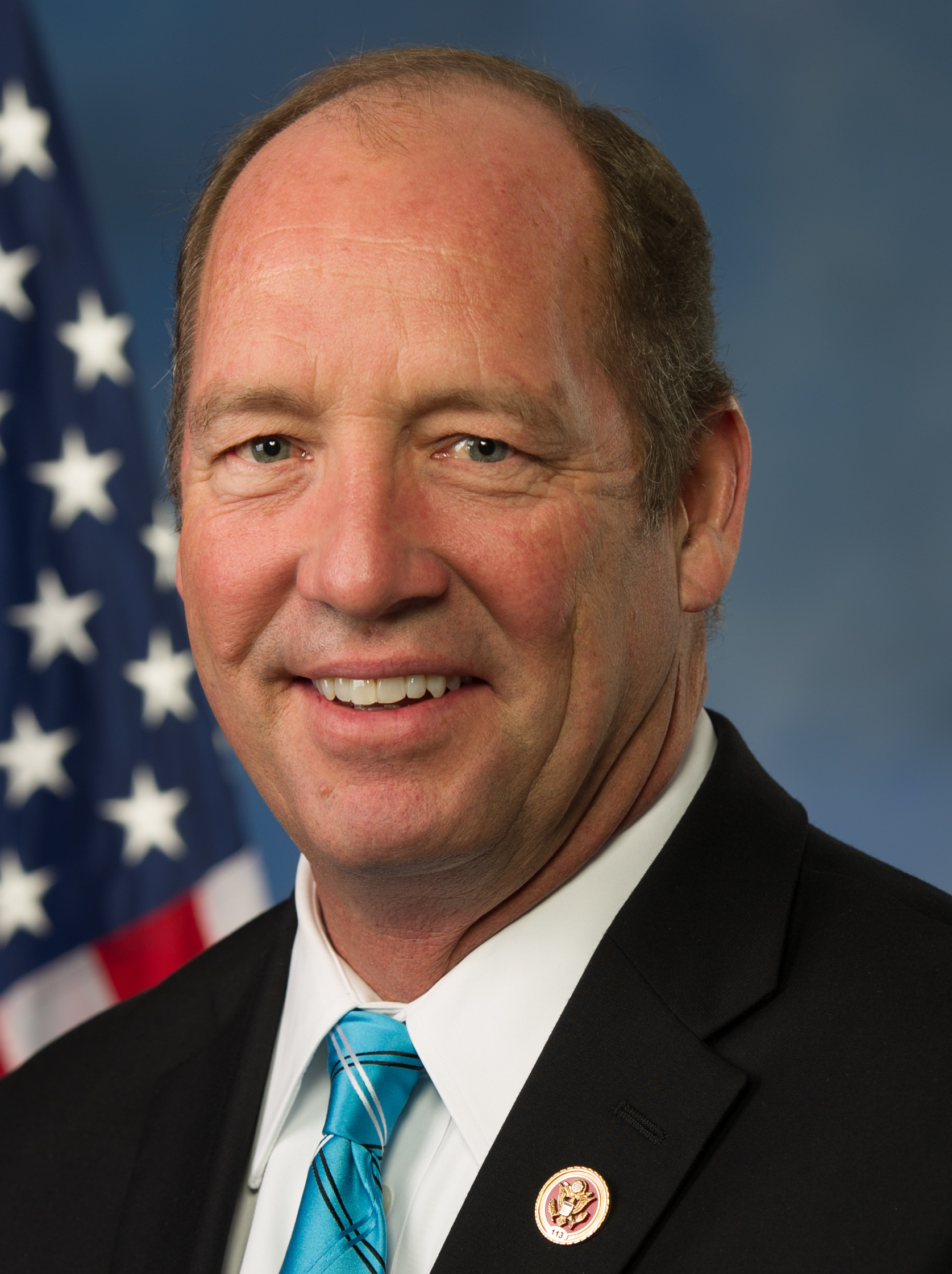

| Nominee | Ted Yoho | Ken McGurn |
| Party | Republican | Democratic |
| Popular vote | 193,843 | 136,338 |
| Percentage | 56.6% | 39.8% |
- County results Yoho: 50–60% 70–80% McGurn: 50–60%
U.S. Representative before election
Ted Yoho
Republican
Elected U.S. Representative
Ted Yoho
Republican

Republican Ted Yoho had represented the district since being elected in 2012, and ran unopposed. Businessman Ken McGurn also ran unopposed for the Democratic nomination.

=== Republican primary ===
==== Candidates ====
===== Nominee =====
- Ted Yoho, incumbent U.S. Representative

=== Democratic primary ===
==== Nominee ====
- Ed Emery, retired federal probation officer

=== General election ===
==== Predictions ====
| Source | Ranking | As of |
|---|---|---|
| The Cook Political Report | Safe R | November 7, 2016 |
| Daily Kos Elections | Safe R | November 7, 2016 |
| Rothenberg | Safe R | November 3, 2016 |
| Sabato's Crystal Ball | Safe R | November 7, 2016 |
| RCP | Safe R | October 31, 2016 |

==== Results ====
Florida’s 3rd congressional district, 2016
| Party | Candidate | Votes | % |
|---|---|---|---|
| Republican | Ted Yoho (incumbent) | 193,843 | 56.6 |
| Democratic | Ken McGurn | 136,338 | 39.8 |
| Independent | Tom Wells | 12,519 | 3.6 |
| Total votes | | 342,700 | 100.0 |
| Republican hold | | | |

== District 4 ==
2016 Florida's 4th congressional district election
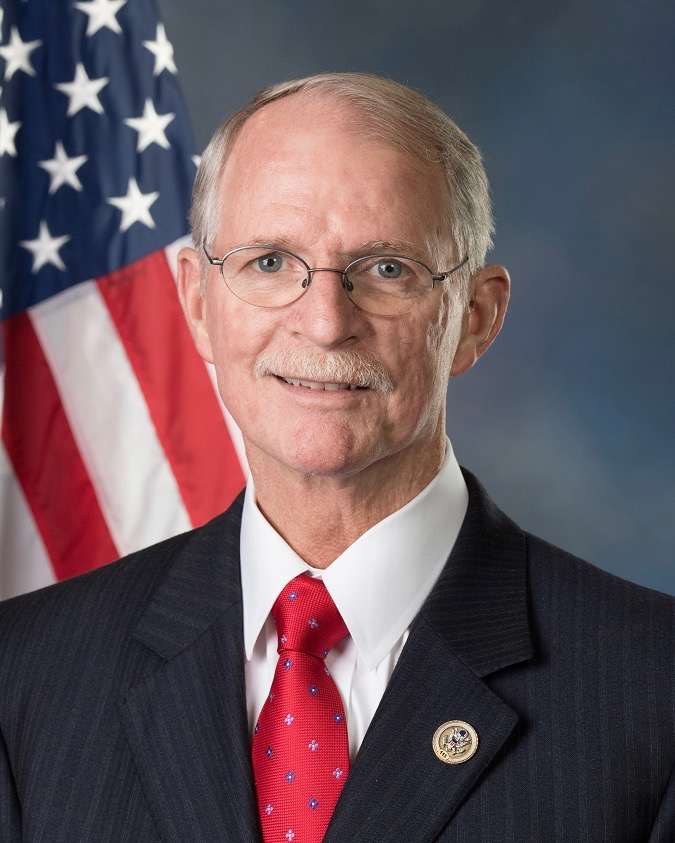

| Nominee | John Rutherford | David E. Bruderly |
| Party | Republican | Democratic |
| Popular vote | 287,509 | 113,088 |
| Percentage | 70.2% | 27.2% |
- County results Rutherford: 60–70% 70–80%
U.S. Representative before election
Ander Crenshaw
Republican
Elected U.S. Representative
John Rutherford
Republican

Republican Ander Crenshaw had represented the district since being elected in 2000. On April 14, 2016, he announced that he would not run for re-election.

=== Republican primary ===
==== Candidates ====
===== Nominee =====
- John Rutherford, former sheriff of Jacksonville

===== Eliminated in primary =====
- Stephen Kaufman, public relations manager
- Ed Malin
- Bill McClure, St. John's County commissioner
- Deborah Katz Pueschel, perennial candidate
- Lake Ray, state representative
- Hans Tanzler III, former US assistant attorney, attorney, farmer, and son of former Jacksonville mayor Hans Tanzler

===== Declined =====
- Aaron Bean, State Senator
- Richard Clark, former Jacksonville City councilmember
- Michael Corrigan, Jacksonville Tax Collector
- Ander Crenshaw, incumbent U.S. Representative
- Lenny Curry, Mayor of Jacksonville
- Jay Fant, State Representative
- Jerry Holland, Duval County Property Appraiser
- Mike Holland, Jacksonville Supervisor of Elections

==== Polling ====
| Poll source | Date(s) administered | Sample size | Margin of error | Jay Fant | Stephen Kaufman | Ed Malin | Bill McClure | Deborah Katz Pueschel | Lake Ray | John Rutherford | Hans Tanzler | Undecided |
|---|---|---|---|---|---|---|---|---|---|---|---|---|
| University of North Florida | August 4–8, 2016 | 600 | ± 4% | — | 2% | 3% | 5% | <1% | 10% | 31% | 13% | 38% |
| University of North Florida | June 28–29, 2016 | 403 | ± 4.9% | — | <1% | <1% | 2% | 2% | 9% | 27% | 13% | 46% |
| St.Pete Polls | April 19, 2016 | 440 | ± 4.7% | 6% | — | — | — | — | 13% | 49% | — | 32% |

==== Results ====
John Rutherford won the primary on August 30, 2016.

Republican primary results
| Party | Candidate | Votes | % |
|---|---|---|---|
| Republican | John Rutherford | 38,784 | 38.7 |
| Republican | Lake Ray | 20,164 | 20.1 |
| Republican | Hans Tanzler | 19,051 | 19.0 |
| Republican | Bill McClure | 9,867 | 9.8 |
| Republican | Edward "Ed" Malin | 7,895 | 7.9 |
| Republican | Stephen J. Kaufman | 2,419 | 2.4 |
| Republican | Deborah Katz Pueschel | 2,145 | 2.1 |
| Total votes | | 100,325 | 100.0 |

=== Democratic primary ===
Former Jacksonville City Councilman and former state representative Eric Smith announced that he would run for the Democratic nomination. On June 22, 2016, Smith announced that he was withdrawing from the race, leaving no Democratic candidates two days before the close of filing.

Dave Bruderly, an environmental engineer who was the nominee for Florida's 6th congressional district in 2004 and 2006, qualified on the last day of filing, and thus was nominated unopposed.

==== Candidates ====
===== Nominee =====
- Dave Bruderly, environmental engineer and nominee for Florida's 6th congressional district in 2004 & 2006

===== Withdrawn =====
- Eric Smith, former state representative

=== General election ===
==== Predictions ====
| Source | Ranking | As of |
|---|---|---|
| The Cook Political Report | Safe R | November 7, 2016 |
| Daily Kos Elections | Safe R | November 7, 2016 |
| Rothenberg | Safe R | November 3, 2016 |
| Sabato's Crystal Ball | Safe R | November 7, 2016 |
| RCP | Safe R | October 31, 2016 |

==== Results ====
Florida’s 4th congressional district, 2016
| Party | Candidate | Votes | % |
|---|---|---|---|
| Republican | John Rutherford | 287,509 | 70.2 |
| Democratic | David E. Bruderly | 113,088 | 27.6 |
| Independent | Gary L. Koniz | 9,054 | 2.2 |
| Independent | Daniel Murphy (write-in) | 11 | 0.0 |
| Total votes | | 409,662 | 100.0 |
| Republican hold | | | |

== District 5 ==
2016 Florida's 5th congressional district election
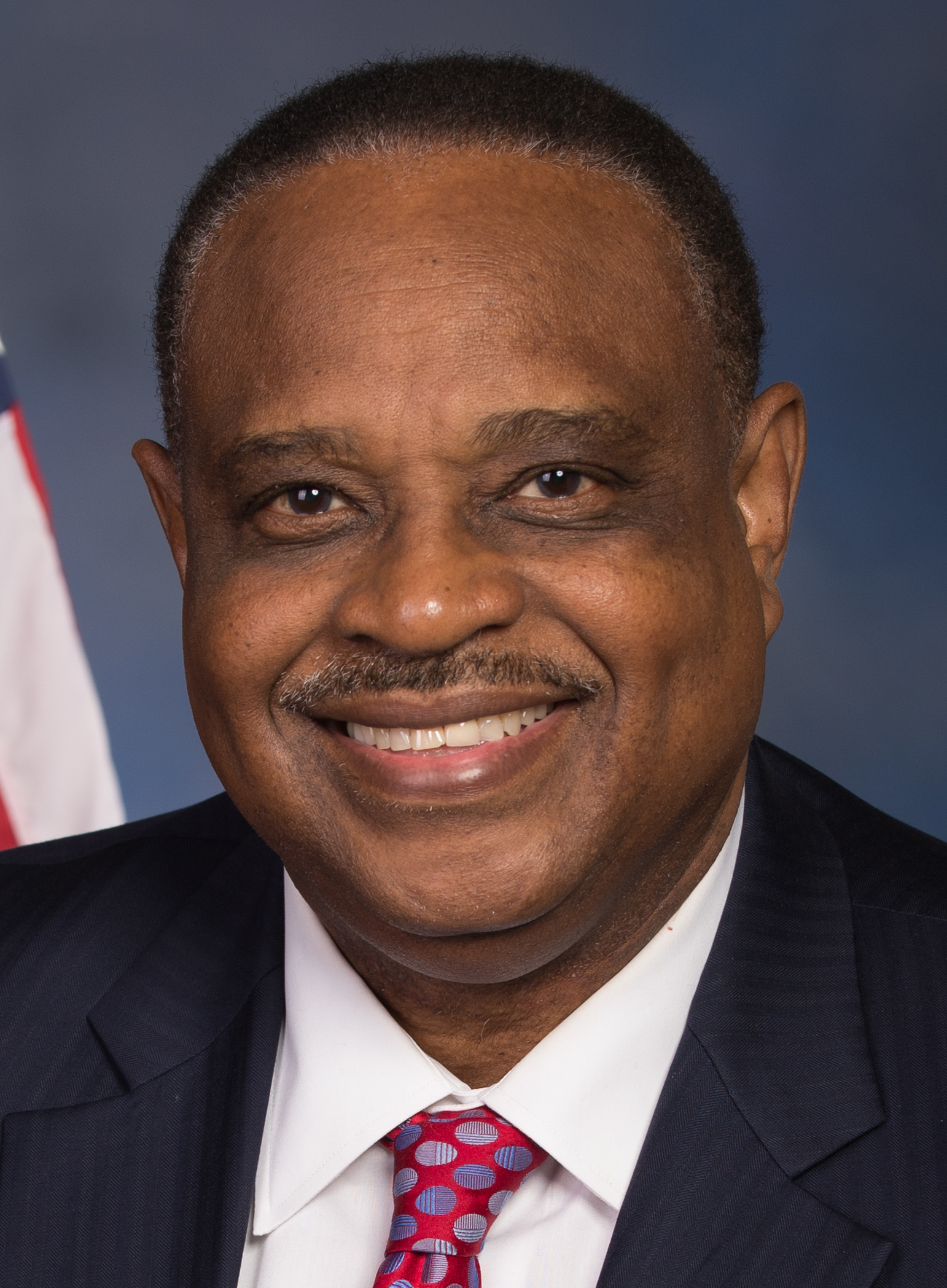

| Nominee | Al Lawson | Glo Smith |
| Party | Democratic | Republican |
| Popular vote | 194,549 | 108,325 |
| Percentage | 64.2% | 35.8% |
- County results Lawson: 50–60% 60–70% 70–80% Smith: 50–60% 70–80%
U.S. Representative before election
Corrine Brown
Democratic
Elected U.S. Representative
Al Lawson
Democratic

Democrat Corrine Brown had represented the district and its various permutations since 1993. The court-ordered redistricting significantly altered her district. She had previously represented a district stretching from Jacksonville to Orlando. The new map pushed the 5th well to the north and west, and made it a more compact district stretching from Tallahassee to Jacksonville.

=== Democratic primary ===
In July 2016, Brown and her chief of staff were indicted on charges of fraud.

==== Candidates ====
===== Nominee =====
- Al Lawson, state senator, nominee for this seat in 2012 and candidate in 2010

===== Eliminated in primary =====
- Corrine Brown, incumbent U.S. Representative
- LJ Holloway

===== Declined =====
- Alvin Brown, former Mayor of Jacksonville
- Audrey Gibson, state senator
- Andrew Gillum, Mayor of Tallahassee
- Tony Hill, former state senator
- Mia Jones, State Representative

==== Debate ====
2016 Florida's 5th congressional district democratic primary debate
| No. | Date | Host | Moderator | Link | Democratic | Democratic | Democratic |
| Key: P Participant A Absent N Not invited I Invited W Withdrawn | | | | | | | |
| Key: P Participant A Absent N Not invited I Invited W Withdrawn | | | | | Corrine Brown | LaShonda Holloway | Al Lawson |
|---|---|---|---|---|---|---|---|
| 1 | | WJXT | Kent Justice | | P | P | P |

==== Polling ====
| Poll source | Date(s) administered | Sample size | Margin of error | Corrine Brown | LJ Holloway | Al Lawson | Undecided |
|---|---|---|---|---|---|---|---|
| University of North Florida | June 27–28, 2016 | 400 | ± 4.9% | 30% | 4% | 27% | 40% |
| St. Pete Polls | April 25, 2016 | 524 | ± 4.3% | 42% | — | 37% | 21% |

==== Results ====
In the Democratic primary—the real contest in this district—she was defeated by former state senator Al Lawson of Tallahassee.

Democratic primary results
| Party | Candidate | Votes | % |
|---|---|---|---|
| Democratic | Al Lawson | 39,306 | 47.6 |
| Democratic | Corrine Brown (incumbent) | 32,235 | 39.0 |
| Democratic | LaShonda "L.J." Holloway | 11,048 | 13.4 |
| Total votes | | 82,589 | 100.0 |

=== Republican primary ===
2014 Republican nominee Glo Smith and 2014 Republican candidate Thuy Lowe initially both ran again. Lowe later switched from this district to a campaign for the 10th district. Hence Scurry-Smith ran unopposed on primary day, August 30, 2016.

==== Candidates ====
===== Nominee =====
- Gloreatha Scurry-Smith, businesswoman, former staff aide to Jennifer Carroll and nominee for this seat in 2014

===== Withdrawn =====
- Thuy Lowe, candidate for this seat in 2014

=== General election ===
==== Predictions ====
| Source | Ranking | As of |
|---|---|---|
| The Cook Political Report | Safe D | November 7, 2016 |
| Daily Kos Elections | Safe D | November 7, 2016 |
| Rothenberg | Safe D | November 3, 2016 |
| Sabato's Crystal Ball | Safe D | November 7, 2016 |
| RCP | Safe D | October 31, 2016 |

==== Results ====
Florida’s 5th congressional district, 2016
| Party | Candidate | Votes | % |
|---|---|---|---|
| Democratic | Al Lawson | 194,549 | 64.2 |
| Republican | Glo Smith | 108,325 | 35.8 |
| Total votes | | 302,874 | 100.0 |
| Democratic hold | | | |

== District 6 ==
2016 Florida's 6th congressional district election
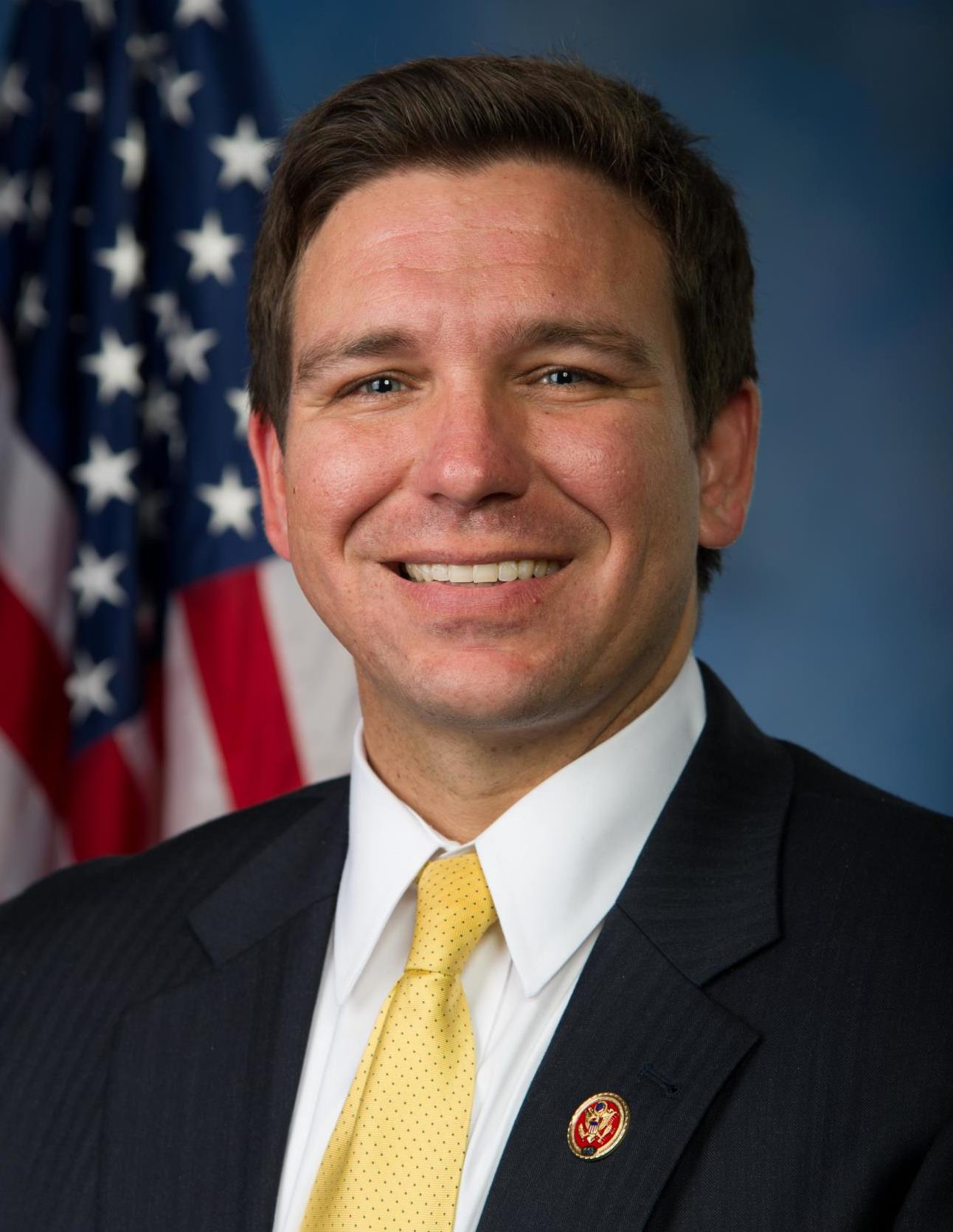

| Nominee | Ron DeSantis | Bill McCollough |
| Party | Republican | Democratic |
| Popular vote | 213,519 | 151,051 |
| Percentage | 58.6% | 41.4% |
- County results DeSantis: 50–60% 60–70%
U.S. Representative before election
Ron DeSantis
Republican
Elected U.S. Representative
Ron DeSantis
Republican

Republican Ron DeSantis had represented the district since being elected in 2012. DeSantis ran for the U.S. Senate, initially creating an open seat, although on June 22, 2016, he withdrew from the Senate race to run for re-election to the House.

=== Republican primary ===
==== Candidates ====
===== Nominee =====
- Ron DeSantis, incumbent U.S. Representative

===== Eliminated in primary =====
- Fred Costello, state representative
- G.G. Galloway, real estate broker

===== Withdrawn =====
- Sandy Adams, former U.S. Representative
- Malcolm Anthony, attorney
- Adam Barringer, former mayor of New Smyrna Beach
- James Jusick, gun-parts manufacturer and retired police officer
- Ric Keller, former U.S. Representative
- Pat Mooney, direct-mail consultant and brother of Congressman Alex Mooney
- Brandon Patty, political consultant
- David Santiago, state representative (running for re-election)

===== Declined =====
- Dorothy Hukill, state senator
- Travis Hutson, state senator
- Mark Miner, former St. Johns County Commissioner
- Doc Renuart, former state representative
- John Rutherford, Duval County Sheriff

==== Endorsements ====
Fred Costello

U.S. Representatives

- Sandy Adams, former U.S. Representative
Ron DeSantis

Organizations

- Club for Growth
G.G. Galloway

Organizations

- National Association of Realtors
Sandy Adams (withdrawn)

U.S. Representatives

- Jason Chaffetz, U.S. Representative

State legislators

- Fred Costello, state representative
Adam Barringer (withdrawn)

Local officials

- Bob Apgar, Mayor of DeLand
- Tom Laputka, Mayor of Orange City
- John Masiarczyk, Mayor of Deltona
Pat Mooney (withdrawn)

Organizations

- Citizens United

Local officials

- Joe Arpaio, Sheriff of Maricopa County, Arizona
Brandon Patty (withdrawn)

State legislators

- Aaron Bean, state senator
- Rob Bradley, state senator
- Travis Hutson, state senator

==== Results ====
Republican primary results
| Party | Candidate | Votes | % |
|---|---|---|---|
| Republican | Ron DeSantis (incumbent) | 41,311 | 61.0 |
| Republican | Fred Costello | 16,690 | 24.7 |
| Republican | G.G. Galloway | 9,683 | 14.3 |
| Total votes | | 67,684 | 100.0 |

=== Democratic primary ===
==== Candidates ====
===== Nominee =====
- Bill McCullough, businessman

===== Eliminated in primary =====
- Jay McGovern, US Navy veteran
- George Pappas, attorney
- Dwayne Taylor, state representative

==== Results ====
Democratic primary results
| Party | Candidate | Votes | % |
|---|---|---|---|
| Democratic | Bill McCullough | 16,043 | 36.7 |
| Democratic | Dwayne Taylor | 12,625 | 28.8 |
| Democratic | Jay McGovern | 8,388 | 19.1 |
| Democratic | George Pappas | 6,762 | 15.4 |
| Total votes | | 43,818 | 100.0 |

=== General election ===
==== Predictions ====
| Source | Ranking | As of |
|---|---|---|
| The Cook Political Report | Safe R | November 7, 2016 |
| Daily Kos Elections | Safe R | November 7, 2016 |
| Rothenberg | Safe R | November 3, 2016 |
| Sabato's Crystal Ball | Safe R | November 7, 2016 |
| RCP | Safe R | October 31, 2016 |

==== Results ====
Florida’s 6th congressional district, 2016
| Party | Candidate | Votes | % |
|---|---|---|---|
| Republican | Ron DeSantis (incumbent) | 213,519 | 58.6 |
| Democratic | Bill McCullough | 151,051 | 41.4 |
| Total votes | | 364,570 | 100.0 |
| Republican hold | | | |

== District 7 ==
2016 Florida's 7th congressional district election
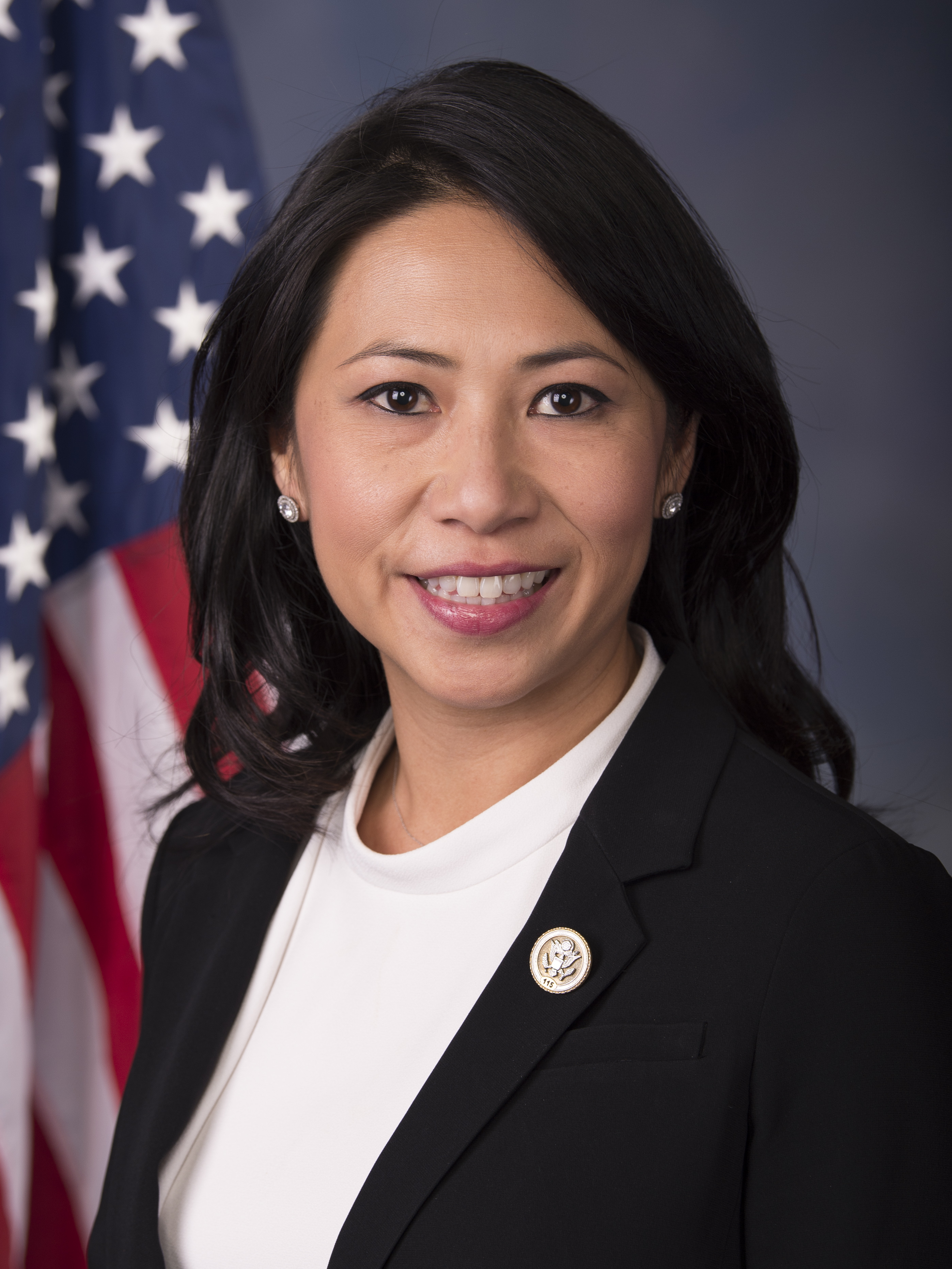

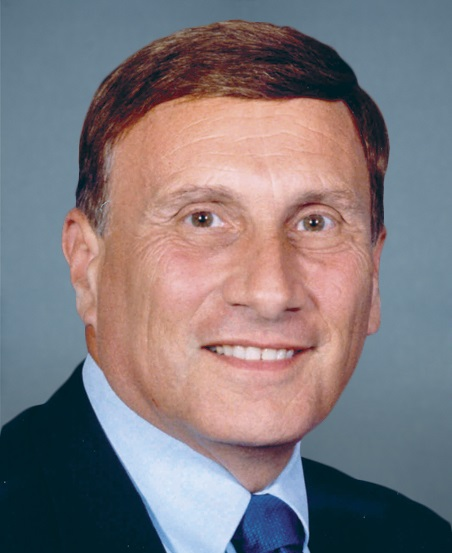
| Nominee | Stephanie Murphy | John Mica |
| Party | Democratic | Republican |
| Popular vote | 182,039 | 171,583 |
| Percentage | 51.5% | 48.5% |
- County results Murphy: 50–60% Mica: 50–60%
U.S. Representative before election
John Mica
Republican
Elected U.S. Representative
Stephanie Murphy
Democratic

Republican John Mica had represented the 7th District since 1992. However, since the Florida Supreme Court's 2015 redistricting decision, Florida's 7th District now includes all of Seminole County and northern Orange County, including downtown Orlando, Winter Park, and the main campus of the University of Central Florida. In 2012, when Mica ran for re-election, he won with 59% of the vote, his smallest margin of victory in twenty years.

=== Republican primary ===
Mica ran for re-election and wound up only facing Mark Busch in the primary election after John Morning ended his campaign in November 2015.

==== Candidates ====
===== Nominee =====
- John Mica, incumbent U.S. Representative

===== Eliminated in primary =====
- Mark Busch, small business owner

===== Withdrawn =====
- John Morning, army veteran

==== Results ====
Republican primary results
| Party | Candidate | Votes | % |
|---|---|---|---|
| Republican | John Mica (incumbent) | 38,528 | 77.2 |
| Republican | Mark Busch | 11,407 | 22.8 |
| Total votes | | 49,935 | 100.0 |

=== Democratic primary ===
Banker Bill Phillips announced a run for the seat on October 19, 2015, but suspended his campaign in February 2016, and ended it in April.

Stephanie Murphy, a businesswoman, Rollins College professor and former U.S. Defense Department national security specialist, entered the race on June 23, 2016, and ran unopposed for the Democratic nomination.

==== Candidates ====
===== Nominee =====
- Stephanie Murphy, businesswoman, Rollins College professor and former U.S. Defense Department national security specialist

===== Withdrawn =====
- Bill Phillips, banker

=== General election ===
==== Endorsements ====
Stephanie Murphy (D)

U.S. Executive Branch officials

- Barack Obama, 44th President of the United States (2009–2017)

U.S. Representatives

- Gabby Giffords, U.S. Representatives (AZ-08)

Organizations

- Democratic Congressional Campaign Committee "Red to Blue" Program
- EMILY's List

==== Predictions ====
| Source | Ranking | As of |
|---|---|---|
| The Cook Political Report | Tossup | November 7, 2016 |
| Daily Kos Elections | Tossup | November 7, 2016 |
| Rothenberg | Tilt D (flip) | November 3, 2016 |
| Sabato's Crystal Ball | Lean D (flip) | November 7, 2016 |
| RCP | Tossup | October 31, 2016 |

==== Results ====
Florida’s 7th congressional district, 2016
| Party | Candidate | Votes | % |
|---|---|---|---|
| Democratic | Stephanie Murphy | 182,039 | 51.5 |
| Republican | John Mica (incumbent) | 171,583 | 48.5 |
| Independent | Mike Plaskon (write-in) | 33 | 0.0 |
| Total votes | | 353,655 | 100.0 |
| Democratic gain from Republican | | | |

== District 8 ==
2016 Florida's 8th congressional district election
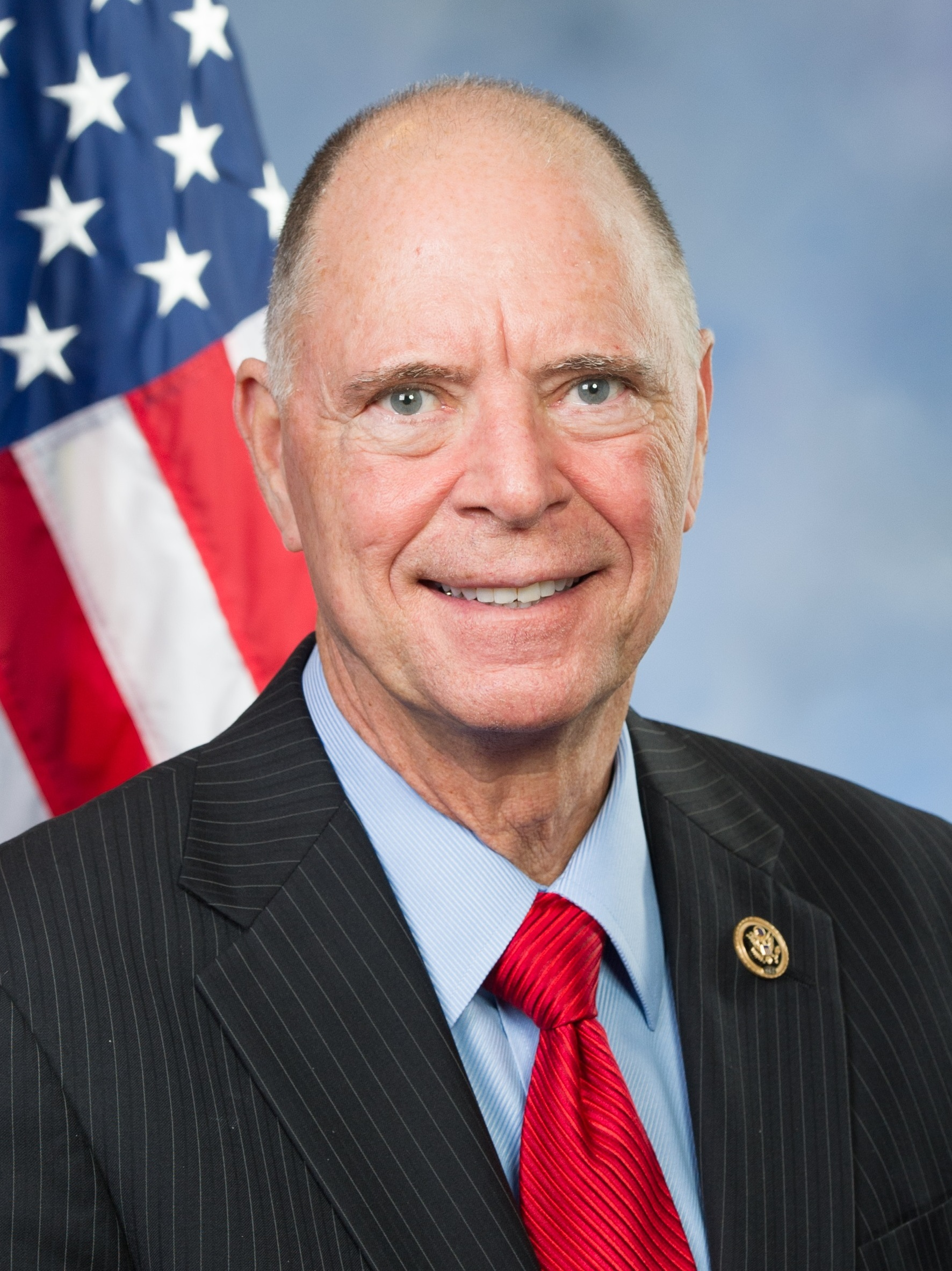

| Nominee | Bill Posey | Corry Westbrook |
| Party | Republican | Democratic |
| Popular vote | 246,483 | 127,127 |
| Percentage | 63.1% | 32.6% |
- County results Posey: 50–60% 60–70%
U.S. Representative before election
Bill Posey
Republican
Elected U.S. Representative
Bill Posey
Republican

Republican Bill Posey had represented the district since being elected in 2012. He previously represented the 15th district from 2009 to 2013, prior to the decennial redistricting. He ran for re-election.

=== Republican primary ===
==== Candidates ====
===== Nominee =====
- Bill Posey, incumbent U.S. Representative

=== Democratic primary ===
==== Candidates ====
===== Nominee =====
- Corry Westbrook, former legislative director of the National Wildlife Federation

=== General election ===
==== Predictions ====
| Source | Ranking | As of |
|---|---|---|
| The Cook Political Report | Safe R | November 7, 2016 |
| Daily Kos Elections | Safe R | November 7, 2016 |
| Rothenberg | Safe R | November 3, 2016 |
| Sabato's Crystal Ball | Safe R | November 7, 2016 |
| RCP | Safe R | October 31, 2016 |

==== Results ====
Florida’s 8th congressional district, 2016
| Party | Candidate | Votes | % |
|---|---|---|---|
| Republican | Bill Posey (incumbent) | 246,483 | 63.1 |
| Democratic | Corry Westbrook | 127,127 | 32.6 |
| Independent | Bill Stinson | 16,951 | 4.3 |
| Total votes | | 390,561 | 100.0 |
| Republican hold | | | |

== District 9 ==
2016 Florida's 9th congressional district election
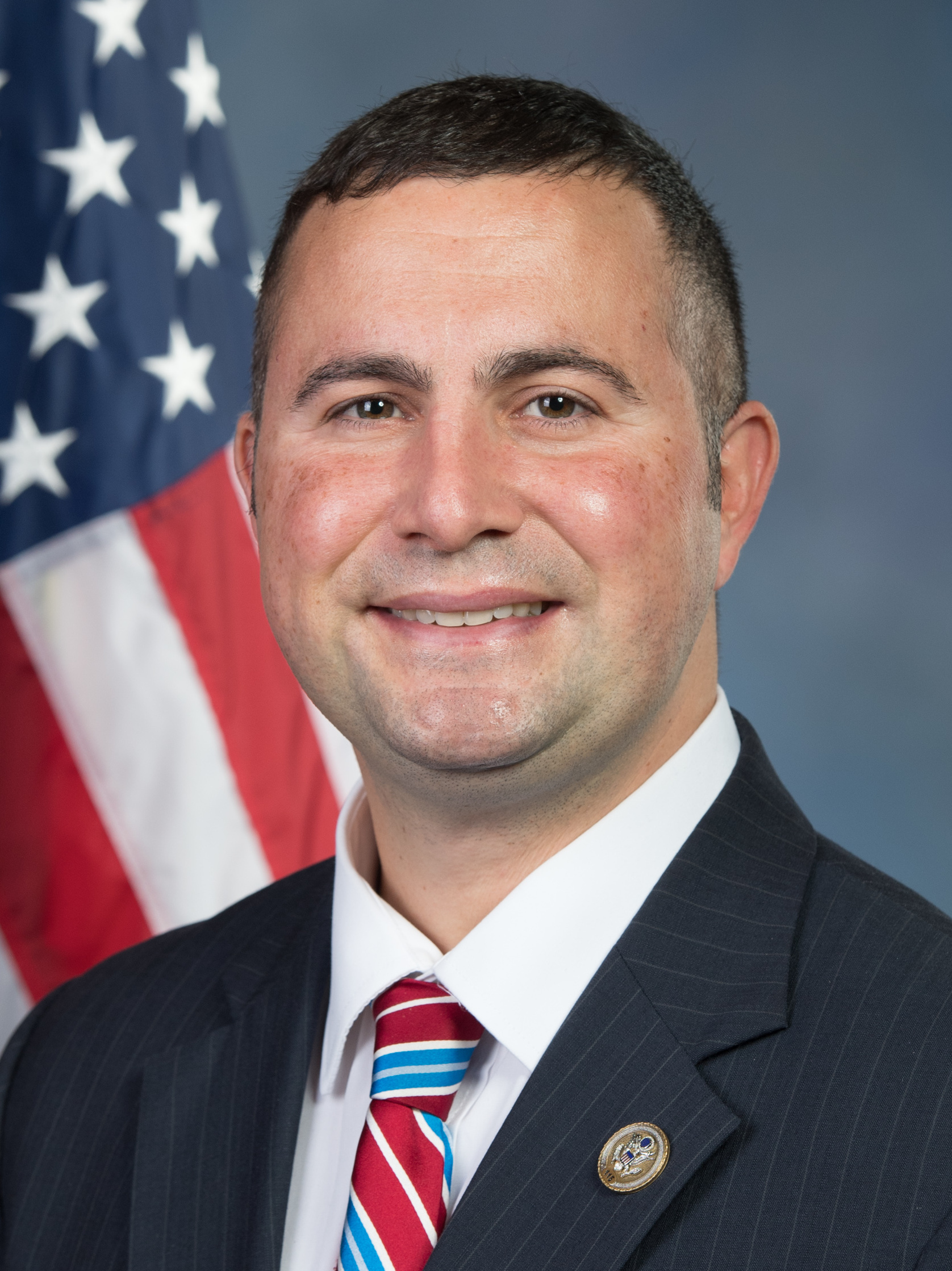

| Nominee | Darren Soto | Wayne Liebnitzky |
| Party | Democratic | Republican |
| Popular vote | 195,311 | 144,450 |
| Percentage | 57.5% | 42.5% |
- County results Soto: 60–70% Liebnitzky: 50–60%
U.S. Representative before election
Alan Grayson
Democratic
Elected U.S. Representative
Darren Soto
Democratic

Democrat Alan Grayson had represented the district since being elected in 2012. He previously represented the 8th district from 2009 to 2011, prior to the decennial redistricting. On July 9, 2015, Grayson announced he would run for U.S. Senate in 2016 rather than seek re-election. Grayson lost the Democratic primary for the U.S. Senate seat to 18th congressional district Representative Patrick Murphy, who defeated Grayson and was declared the winner on August 30, 2016.

=== Democratic primary ===
==== Candidates ====
===== Nominee =====
- Darren Soto, state senator

===== Eliminated in primary =====
- Valleri Crabtree, professor and former Chair of the Osceola County Democratic Committee
- Dena Minning Grayson, biochemist and medical doctor
- Susannah Randolph, district director for Rep. Grayson

===== Withdrawn =====
- Ricardo Rangel, former state representative (withdrew May 16)

===== Declined =====
- Val Demings, former Orlando Police Chief and nominee for the 10th district in 2012
- Alan Grayson, incumbent U.S. Representative (running for Senate)

==== Endorsements ====
Susannah Randolph

U.S. Representatives

- Jim Bacchus, former U.S. Representative
- Diana DeGette, U.S. Representative from Colorado's 1st congressional district and co-chair of the Congressional Progressive Caucus
- Keith Ellison, U.S. Representative from Michigan's 5th congressional district
- Lois Frankel, U.S. Representative from Florida's 22nd congressional district
- Raúl Grijalva, U.S. Representative from Arizona's 3rd congressional district
- Barbara Lee, U.S. Representative from California's 13th congressional district
- Jerry Nadler, U.S. Representative from New York's 10th congressional district
- Mark Pocan, U.S. Representative from Wisconsin's 2nd congressional district
- Jan Schakowsky, U.S. Representative from Illinois's 9th congressional district
- Patricia Schroeder, former U.S. Representative from Colorado's 1st congressional district

State legislators

- Mark Pafford, Florida House of Representatives democratic leader

Labor unions

- AFGE
- Air Line Pilots Association, International
- Florida Education Association
- National Education Association
- National Nurses United
- Teamsters
- UFCW
- UNITE HERE Locals 362 & 737
- United Association

Organizations

- Brady Campaign
- Clean Water Action
- Congressional Progressive Caucus
- Democracy for America
- EMILY's List
- Feminist Majority
- National Committee to Preserve Social Security and Medicare
- National Organization for Women PAC
- National Women's Political Caucus
- People for the American Way
- Progressive Change Campaign Committee

Local officials

- Martha Haynie, Orange County Comptroller
- Viviana Janer, Osceola County commission chair
- Rick Kriseman, Mayor of St. Petersburg

Individuals

- Rita Bornstein, former President of Rollins College
- John Morgan, attorney
Darren Soto

U.S. Representatives

- Xavier Becerra, U.S. Representative (CA-34) and Chairman of the House Democratic Conference
- Brendan Boyle, U.S. Representative from Pennsylvania's 2nd congressional district
- Tony Cárdenas, U.S. Representative from California's 29th congressional district
- Gerry Connolly, U.S. Representative (VA-11)
- Luis Gutierrez, U.S. Representative (CA-34)
- Alcee Hastings, U.S. Representative (FL-20)
- Jim Himes, U.S. Representative (CT-04)
- Hakeem Jeffries, U.S. Representative from New York's 8th congressional district
- Scott Peters, U.S. Representative from California's 52nd congressional district
- Pedro Pierluisi, Resident Commissioner of Puerto Rico
- Jared Polis, U.S. Representative (CO-02)
- Stacey Plaskett, delegate to the House of Representatives from the U.S. Virgin Islands
- Linda Sánchez, U.S. Representative from California's 39th congressional district
- Juan Vargas, U.S. Representative (CA-51)
- Filemon Vela Jr., U.S. Representative from Texas's 34th congressional district
- Nydia Velázquez, U.S. Representative (NY-07)

State legislators

- Randolph Bracy, state representative
- Oscar Braynon, state senator
- John Cortes, state representative
- Janet Cruz, Minority Leader of the house of representatives
- Bobby DuBose, state representative
- Dwight Dudley, state representative
- Joseph Geller, state representative
- Mia Jones, state representative
- Shevrin Jones, state representative
- Dave Kerner, state representative
- Larry Lee Jr., state representative
- Gwen Margolis, state senator
- Kionne McGhee, state representative
- Kevin Rader, state representative
- David Richardson, state representative
- Hazelle Rogers, state representative
- Irving Slosberg, state representative
- Cynthia Stafford, state representative
- Rick Stark, state representative
- Dwayne Taylor, state representative
- Alan Williams, state representative

Labor unions

- Florida Police Benevolent Association
- IBEW
- International Association of Bridge, Structural, Ornamental and Reinforcing Iron Workers
- International Association of Fire Fighters
- International Association of Machinists and Aerospace Workers
- IUPAT
- LiUNA
- Teamsters Local 2011
- UFW (post primary)

Organizations

- New Democrat Coalition
- Ocean Champions

Newspapers

- Orlando Sentinel

Local officials

- Brandon Arrington, Osceola County commissioner
- Donna Hart, former Mayor of St. Cloud

Individuals

- Dolores Huerta, labor leader & civil rights activist (post primary, endorsed Randolph during primary)
- Kenneth McClintock, former Secretary of State of Puerto Rico (Note: Article says lieutenant governor; the Secretary of State of Puerto Rico fulfills the same role)

==== Polling ====
| Poll source | Date(s) administered | Sample size | Margin of error | Valleri Crabtree | Dena Grayson | Susannah Randolph | Ricardo Rangel | Darren Soto | Undecided |
|---|---|---|---|---|---|---|---|---|---|
| St. Pete Polls | August 23, 2016 | 336 (LV) | ± 5.3% | 10% | 33% | 27% | – | 19% | 10% |
| Gravis Marketing (D-Grayson) | June 10–13, 2016 | 554 (RV) | ± 4.2% | – | 31% | 4% | – | 11% | 54% |
| SEA Polling & Strategic Design | October 28–November 1, 2015 | 400 (LV) | | – | 6% | 4% | 1% | 25% | 54% |

==== Results ====
Soto was declared the winner of the Democratic primary for the 9th District on August 30, 2016.

Democratic primary results
| Party | Candidate | Votes | % |
|---|---|---|---|
| Democratic | Darren Soto | 14,496 | 36.3 |
| Democratic | Susannah Randolph | 11,267 | 28.2 |
| Democratic | Dena Grayson | 11,122 | 27.8 |
| Democratic | Valleri Crabtree | 3,093 | 7.7 |
| Total votes | | 39,978 | 100.0 |

=== Republican primary ===
==== Candidates ====
===== Nominee =====
- Wayne Liebnitzky, engineer

===== Eliminated in primary =====
- Wanda Rentas, vice mayor of Kissimmee

===== Declined =====
- Mike La Rosa, state representative

==== Results ====
Republican primary results
| Party | Candidate | Votes | % |
|---|---|---|---|
| Republican | Wayne Liebnitzky | 22,725 | 67.6 |
| Republican | Wanda Rentas | 10,911 | 32.4 |
| Total votes | | 33,636 | 100.0 |

=== General election ===
==== Predictions ====
| Source | Ranking | As of |
|---|---|---|
| The Cook Political Report | Safe D | November 7, 2016 |
| Daily Kos Elections | Safe D | November 7, 2016 |
| Rothenberg | Safe D | November 3, 2016 |
| Sabato's Crystal Ball | Safe D | November 7, 2016 |
| RCP | Safe D | October 31, 2016 |

==== Results ====
Florida’s 9th congressional district, 2016
| Party | Candidate | Votes | % |
|---|---|---|---|
| Democratic | Darren Soto | 195,311 | 57.5 |
| Republican | Wayne Liebnitzky | 144,450 | 42.5 |
| Total votes | | 339,761 | 100.0 |
| Democratic hold | | | |

== District 10 ==
2016 Florida's 10th congressional district election
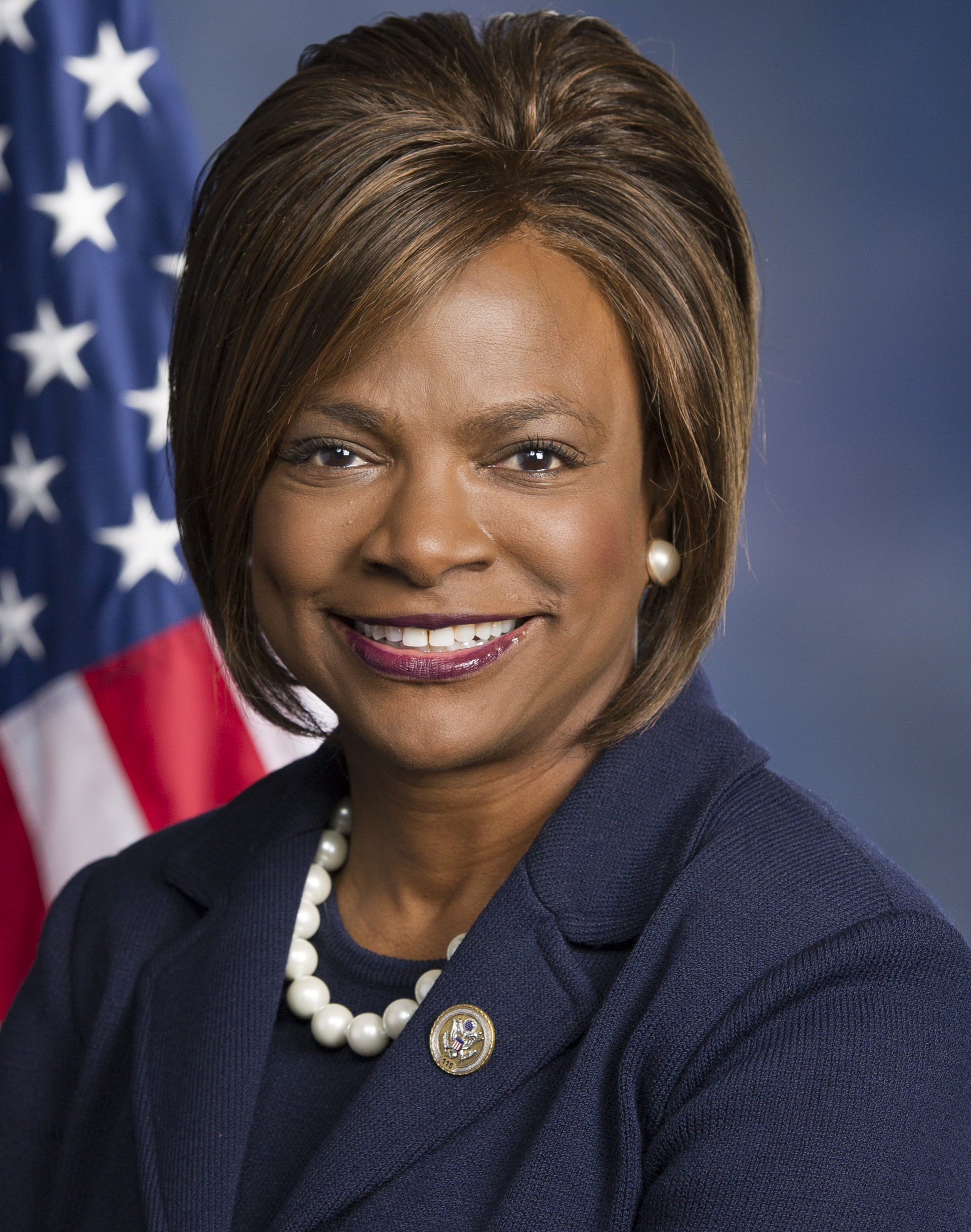

| Nominee | Val Demings | Thuy Lowe |
| Party | Democratic | Republican |
| Popular vote | 198,491 | 107,498 |
| Percentage | 64.9% | 35.1% |
- Precinct results Demings: 50–60% 60–70% 70–80% 80–90% >90% Lowe: 50–60% 60–70% 70–80% >90% Tie: 50%
U.S. Representative before election
Daniel Webster
Republican
Elected U.S. Representative
Val Demings
Democratic

Republican Daniel Webster had represented the district since being elected in 2012. He previously represented the 8th district from 2011 to 2013, prior to the decennial redistricting. However, after redistricting made the 10th substantially more Democratic, Webster opted to run in the neighboring 11th District, which included a slice of his former territory.

=== Republican primary ===
==== Candidates ====
Geoff LaGarde withdrew his name from the race on June 24, and endorsed Thuy Lowe for the nomination. Lowe was declared the nominee, and no Republican primary was held.

==== Candidates ====
===== Nominee =====
- Thuy Lowe

===== Withdrawn =====
- Geoff LaGarde

===== Declined =====
- Daniel Webster, incumbent U.S. Representative

=== Democratic primary ===
==== Candidates ====
===== Nominee =====
- Val Demings, former Orlando Police Chief and nominee for this seat in 2012

===== Eliminated in primary =====
- Fatima Fahmy, attorney
- Bob Poe, former chair of the Florida Democratic Party
- Geraldine Thompson, state senator

==== Endorsements ====
Val Demings

U.S. Executive Branch officials

- Barack Obama, President of the United States

U.S. Senators

- Chris Murphy, U.S. Senator from Connecticut

U.S. Representatives

- Tony Cárdenas, U.S. Representative from California's 29th congressional district
- Gabby Giffords, former U.S. Representative for Arizona's 8th congressional district
- Steny Hoyer, House Minority Whip
- Nancy Pelosi, House Minority Leader
- Nydia Velázquez, U.S. Representative from New York's 7th congressional district

Labor unions

- American Nurses Association
- IBEW
- International Association of Sheet Metal, Air, Rail and Transportation Workers
- LiUNA Local 517
- SEIU
- Teamsters Local 385
- UFCW

Organizations

- Council for a Livable World
- EMILY's List
- National Committee to Preserve Social Security and Medicare
- New Democrat Coalition

Newspapers

- Orlando Sentinel

Local officials

- Buddy Dyer, Mayor of Orlando
Fatima Fahmy

Individuals

- Cornel West, philosopher and political activist
Bob Poe

Organizations

- Central Florida Police Benevolent Association

==== Polling ====
| Poll source | Date(s) administered | Sample size (Note: Key: A – all adults RV – registered voters LV – likely voters V – unclear) | Margin of error | Val Demings | Fatima Fahmy | Bob Poe | Geraldine Thompson | Undecided |
|---|---|---|---|---|---|---|---|---|
| DCCC (Note: The DCCC supports Demings) | | 402 (LV) | ± 4.9% | 48% | – | 18% | 18% | 17% |
| Public Policy Polling (D) (Note: Poll commissioned by Demings' campaign) | January 26–28, 2016 | 506 (LV) | | 44% | – | 7% | 24% | 21% |

==== Results ====
Demings was declared the winner of the Democratic primary for the 10th District on August 30, 2016.

Democratic primary results
| Party | Candidate | Votes | % |
|---|---|---|---|
| Democratic | Val Demings | 23,260 | 57.1 |
| Democratic | Geraldine F. Thompson | 8,192 | 20.1 |
| Democratic | Bob Poe | 6,918 | 17.0 |
| Democratic | Fatima Rita Fahmy | 2,349 | 5.8 |
| Total votes | | 40,719 | 100.0 |

=== General election ===
==== Endorsements ====
Val Demings (D)

Organizations

- Democratic Congressional Campaign Committee "Red to Blue" Program

==== Predictions ====
| Source | Ranking | As of |
|---|---|---|
| The Cook Political Report | Likely D (flip) | November 7, 2016 |
| Daily Kos Elections | Safe D (flip) | November 7, 2016 |
| Rothenberg | Safe D (flip) | November 3, 2016 |
| Sabato's Crystal Ball | Safe D (flip) | November 7, 2016 |
| RCP | Likely D (flip) | October 31, 2016 |

==== Results ====
Florida’s 10th congressional district, 2016
| Party | Candidate | Votes | % |
|---|---|---|---|
| Democratic | Val Demings | 198,491 | 64.9 |
| Republican | Thuy Lowe | 107,498 | 35.1 |
| Total votes | | 305,989 | 100.0 |
| Democratic gain from Republican | | | |

== District 11 ==
2016 Florida's 11th congressional district election
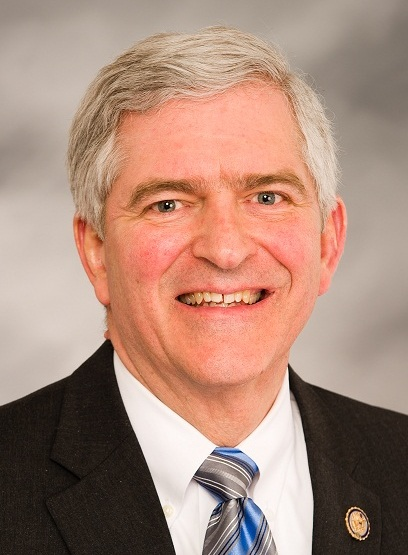

| Nominee | Daniel Webster | Dave Koller |
| Party | Republican | Democratic |
| Popular vote | 258,016 | 124,713 |
| Percentage | 65.4% | 31.6% |
- County results Webster: 60–70% 70–80%
U.S. Representative before election
Rich Nugent
Republican
Elected U.S. Representative
Daniel Webster
Republican

Republican Rich Nugent represented the district since being elected in 2011 (it was numbered as the 5th district from 2011 to 2013, prior to the decennial redistricting). He did not seek re-election.

=== Republican primary ===
==== Candidates ====
===== Nominee =====
- Daniel Webster, incumbent U.S. Representative for the 10th district

===== Eliminated in primary =====
- Justin Grabelle, Rich Nugent's former chief-of-staff

===== Declined =====
- Rich Nugent, incumbent U.S. Representative

==== Results ====
Webster was declared the primary winner on August 30, 2016.

Republican primary results
| Party | Candidate | Votes | % |
|---|---|---|---|
| Republican | Daniel Webster | 52,876 | 59.8 |
| Republican | Justin Grabelle | 35,525 | 40.1 |
| Total votes | | 88,401 | 100.0 |

=== Democratic primary ===
==== Candidates ====
===== Nominee =====
- Dave Koller, businessman and nominee for this seat in 2014

=== General election ===
==== Predictions ====
| Source | Ranking | As of |
|---|---|---|
| The Cook Political Report | Safe R | November 7, 2016 |
| Daily Kos Elections | Safe R | November 7, 2016 |
| Rothenberg | Safe R | November 3, 2016 |
| Sabato's Crystal Ball | Safe R | November 7, 2016 |
| RCP | Safe R | October 31, 2016 |

==== Results ====
Florida’s 11th congressional district, 2016
| Party | Candidate | Votes | % |
|---|---|---|---|
| Republican | Daniel Webster | 258,016 | 65.4 |
| Democratic | Dave Koller | 124,713 | 31.6 |
| Independent | Bruce Ray Riggs | 11,990 | 3.0 |
| Total votes | | 394,719 | 100.0 |
| Republican hold | | | |

== District 12 ==
2016 Florida's 12th congressional district election
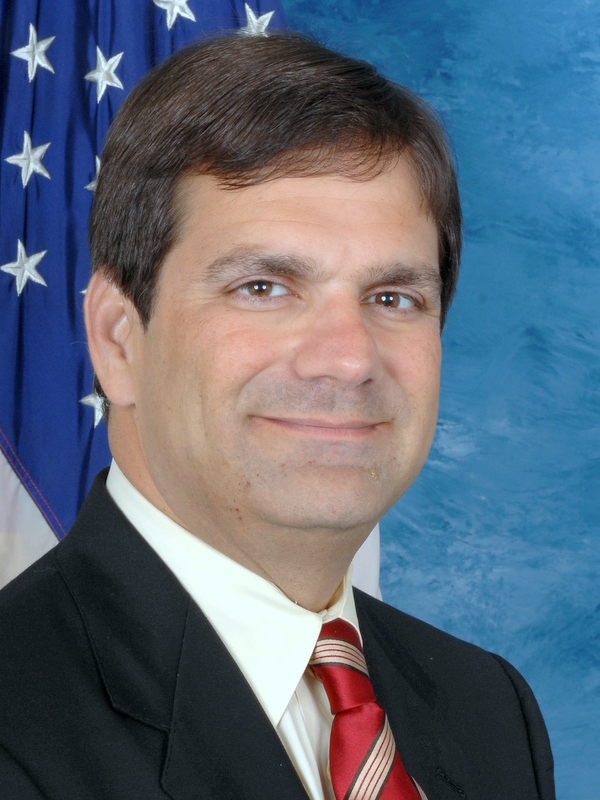

| Nominee | Gus Bilirakis | Robert Tager |
| Party | Republican | Democratic |
| Popular vote | 253,559 | 116,110 |
| Percentage | 68.6% | 31.4% |
- County results Bilirakis: 60–70% 70–80%
U.S. Representative before election
Gus Bilirakis
Republican
Elected U.S. Representative
Gus Bilirakis
Republican

Republican Gus Bilirakis had represented the district since being elected in 2012. He previously represented the 9th district from 2007 to 2013, prior to the decennial redistricting.

=== Republican primary ===
==== Candidates ====
===== Nominee =====
- Gus Bilirakis, incumbent U.S. Representative

=== Democratic primary ===
==== Candidates ====
===== Nominee =====
- Robert Tager, attorney

=== General election ===
==== Predictions ====
| Source | Ranking | As of |
|---|---|---|
| The Cook Political Report | Safe R | November 7, 2016 |
| Daily Kos Elections | Safe R | November 7, 2016 |
| Rothenberg | Safe R | November 3, 2016 |
| Sabato's Crystal Ball | Safe R | November 7, 2016 |
| RCP | Safe R | October 31, 2016 |

==== Results ====
Florida’s 12th congressional district, 2016
| Party | Candidate | Votes | % |
|---|---|---|---|
| Republican | Gus Bilirakis (incumbent) | 253,559 | 68.6 |
| Democratic | Robert Matthew Tager | 116,110 | 31.4 |
| Total votes | | 369,669 | 100.0 |
| Republican hold | | | |

== District 13 ==
2016 Florida's 13th congressional district election
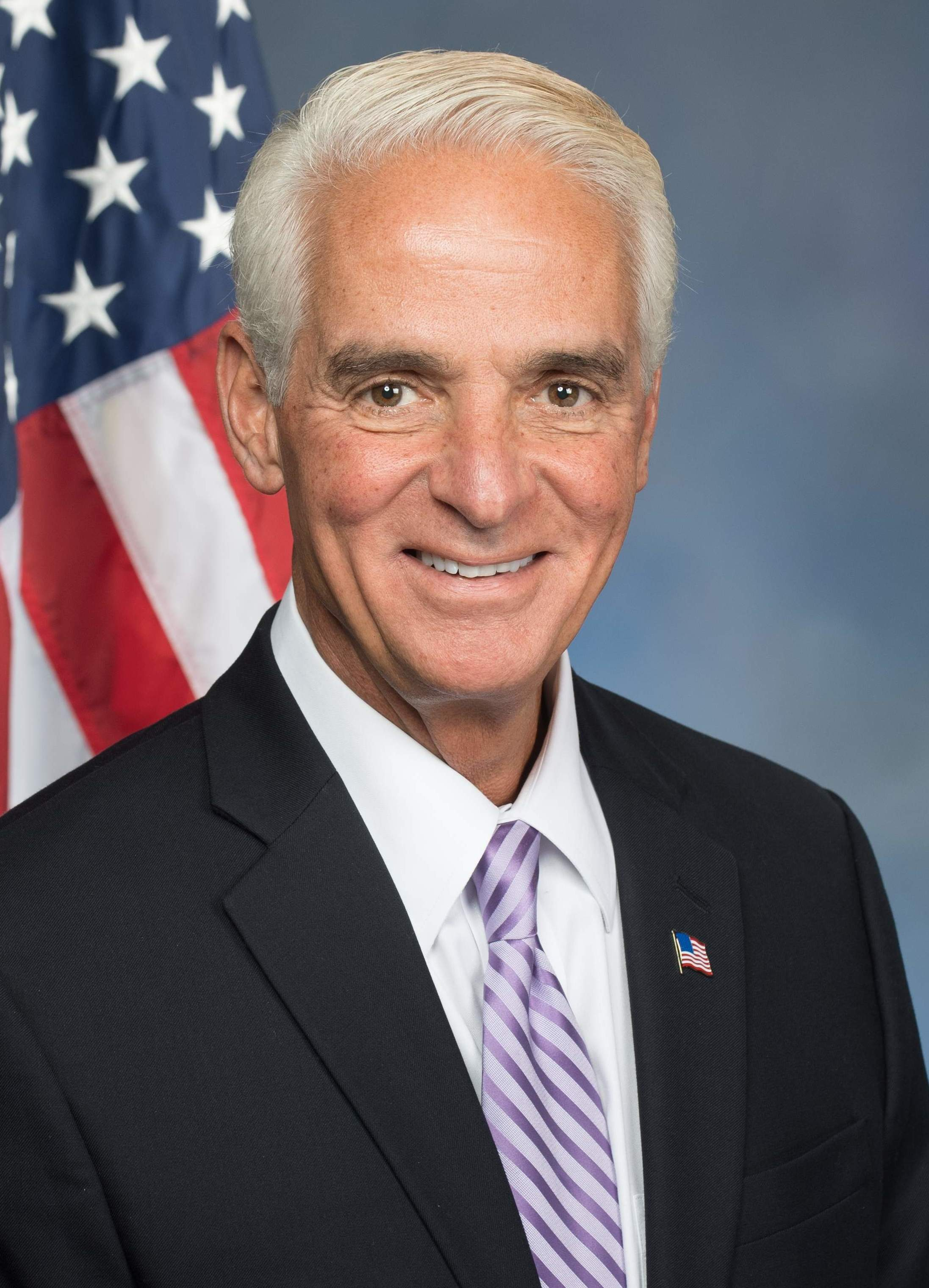

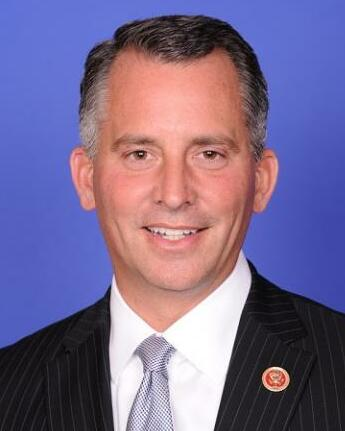
| Nominee | Charlie Crist | David Jolly |
| Party | Democratic | Republican |
| Popular vote | 184,693 | 171,149 |
| Percentage | 51.9% | 48.1% |
- Precinct results Crist: 50–60% 60–70% 70–80% 80–90% >90% Jolly: 50–60% 60–70% 70–80% >90% Tie: 50% No votes
U.S. Representative before election
David Jolly
Republican
Elected U.S. Representative
Charlie Crist
Democratic

Republican David Jolly had represented the district since being elected in a special election in 2014. Jolly ran for the U.S. Senate, initially creating an open seat, though, on June 17, 2016, he withdrew from the Senate race to run for re-election to the House, citing "unfinished business."

=== Republican primary ===
==== Candidates ====
===== Nominee =====
- David Jolly, incumbent U.S. Representative

===== Eliminated in primary =====
- Mark Bircher, commercial pilot, retired United States Marine Corps Brigadier General, candidate for the seat in the 2014 special election

===== Declined =====
- Rick Baker, former mayor of St. Petersburg
- Jeff Brandes, state senator (running for re-election)
- George Cretekos, Mayor of Clearwater
- Bob Gualtieri, Pinellas County Sheriff (running for re-election)
- Frank Hibbard, former mayor of Clearwater
- Jack Latvala, state senator
- Susan Latvala, former Pinellas County Commissioner
- Ash Mason, former staffer to Sen. Marco Rubio
- Kathleen Peters, state representative and candidate for the seat in 2014
- Karen Seel, Pinellas County Commissioner (running for re-election)

==== Results ====
Primary election
| Party | Candidate | Votes | % |
|---|---|---|---|
| Republican | David Jolly (incumbent) | 41,005 | 75.1 |
| Republican | Mark Bircher | 13,592 | 24.9 |
| Total votes | | 54,597 | 100 |

=== Democratic primary ===
==== Candidates ====
===== Nominee =====
- Charlie Crist, former Republican-turned-independent Governor of Florida, independent candidate for U.S. Senate in 2010, and Democratic nominee for Governor in 2014

===== Withdrawn =====
- Eric Lynn, political consultant and former White House Middle East policy adviser and Pentagon official (running for state house)

===== Declined =====
- Dwight Dudley, state representative
- Rick Kriseman, Mayor of St. Petersburg
- Mary Mulhern, former Tampa city councilwoman
- Darden Rice, St. Petersburg city councilwoman

==== Endorsements ====
Charlie Crist
- Kathy Castor, U.S. Representative
- Janet Long, Pinellas County Commissioner
- Wengay Newton, St. Petersburg City councilman
- Karl Nurse, St. Petersburg City councilman
- Darden Rice, St. Petersburg City councilwoman
- Alex Sink, former Chief Financial Officer of Florida, nominee for Governor of Florida in 2010, and nominee for this seat in 2014
- Ken Welch, Pinellas County Commissioner
Eric Lynn (withdrawn)
- Wanda Dudley, Mayor of Kenneth City
- Patricia Gerard, Pinellas County Commissioner
- Sam Henderson, Mayor of Gulfport
- Charlie Justice, Pinellas County Commissioner
- Rick Kriseman, Mayor of St. Petersburg
- Craig Sher, real estate developer
- Peter Rudy Wallace, former Speaker of the Florida House of Representatives

=== General election ===
==== Endorsements ====
Charlie Crist (D)

Organizations

- Democratic Congressional Campaign Committee "Red to Blue" Program

==== Polling ====
| Poll source | Date(s) administered | Sample size | Margin of error | David Jolly (R) | Charlie Crist (D) | Undecided |
|---|---|---|---|---|---|---|
| St. Pete Polls | October 10, 2016 | 1,280 | ± 2.7% | 42% | 48% | 10% |
| St. Pete Polls | September 18, 2016 | 739 | ± 3.6% | 46% | 42% | 12% |
| Data Targeting (R-Jolly) | September 8–10, 2016 | 300 | ± 5.7% | 46% | 46% | 8% |
| ALG Research (D-Crist) | July 12–17, 2016 | 501 | ± 4.4% | 38% | 50% | 12% |
| St. Pete Polls | June 9, 2016 | 746 | ± 3.6% | 44% | 44% | 12% |
| Public Policy Polling (D-Crist) | June 6–7, 2016 | 1,030 | – | 43% | 46% | 11% |
| McLaughlin & Associates (R-Jolly) | June 1–2, 2016 | 400 | ± 4.9% | 50% | 38% | 12% |

==== Predictions ====
| Source | Ranking | As of |
|---|---|---|
| The Cook Political Report | Lean D (flip) | November 7, 2016 |
| Daily Kos Elections | Lean D (flip) | November 7, 2016 |
| Rothenberg | Lean D (flip) | November 3, 2016 |
| Sabato's Crystal Ball | Lean D (flip) | November 7, 2016 |
| RCP | Lean D (flip) | October 31, 2016 |

==== Results ====
Florida’s 13th congressional district, 2016
| Party | Candidate | Votes | % |
|---|---|---|---|
| Democratic | Charlie Crist | 184,693 | 51.9 |
| Republican | David Jolly (incumbent) | 171,149 | 48.1 |
| Total votes | | 355,842 | 100.0 |
| Democratic gain from Republican | | | |

== District 14 ==
2016 Florida's 14th congressional district election
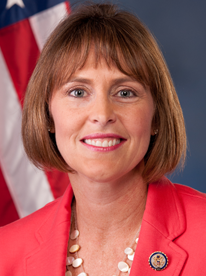

| Nominee | Kathy Castor | Christine Quinn |
| Party | Democratic | Republican |
| Popular vote | 195,795 | 121,088 |
| Percentage | 61.8% | 38.2% |
- Precinct results Castor: 50–60% 60–70% 70–80% 80–90% >90% Quinn: 50–60% 60–70% Tie: 50%
U.S. Representative before election
Kathy Castor
Democratic
Elected U.S. Representative
Kathy Castor
Democratic

Democrat Kathy Castor had represented the district since being elected in 2012. She previously represented the 11th district from 2007 to 2013, prior to the decennial redistricting. Businesswoman Christine Quinn challenged Castor as a Republican.

=== Democratic primary ===
==== Candidates ====
===== Nominee =====
- Kathy Castor, incumbent U.S. Representative

=== Republican primary ===
==== Candidates ====
===== Nominee =====
- Christine Quinn, businesswoman

===== Declined =====
- Mike Prendergast, former chief of staff to Governor Rick Scott and nominee for this seat in 2010

=== General election ===
==== Predictions ====
| Source | Ranking | As of |
|---|---|---|
| The Cook Political Report | Safe D | November 7, 2016 |
| Daily Kos Elections | Safe D | November 7, 2016 |
| Rothenberg | Safe D | November 3, 2016 |
| Sabato's Crystal Ball | Safe D | November 7, 2016 |
| RCP | Safe D | October 31, 2016 |

==== Results ====
Florida’s 14th congressional district, 2016
| Party | Candidate | Votes | % |
|---|---|---|---|
| Democratic | Kathy Castor (incumbent) | 195,789 | 61.8 |
| Republican | Christine Quinn | 121,088 | 38.2 |
| Total votes | | 316,877 | 100.0 |
| Democratic hold | | | |

== District 15 ==
2016 Florida's 15th congressional district election
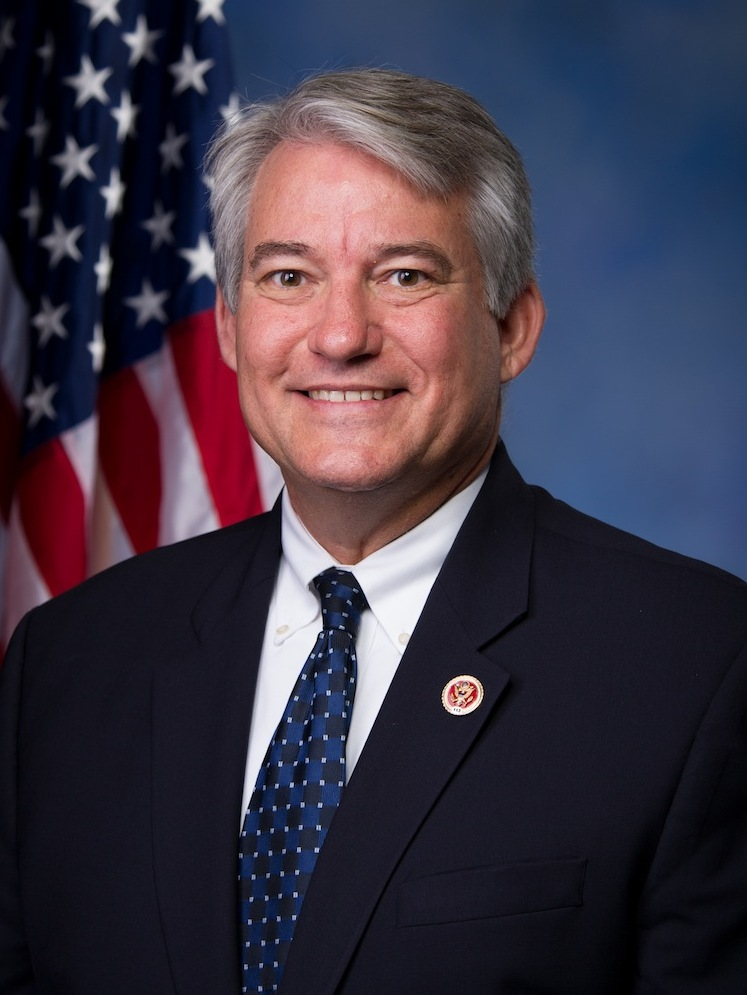

| Nominee | Dennis Ross | Jim Lange |
| Party | Republican | Democratic |
| Popular vote | 182,999 | 135,475 |
| Percentage | 57.5% | 42.5% |
- County results Ross: 50–60% 60–70%
U.S. Representative before election
Dennis Ross
Republican
Elected U.S. Representative
Dennis Ross
Republican

Republican Dennis A. Ross had represented the district since being elected in 2012. He previously represented the 12th district from 2011 to 2013, prior to the decennial redistricting. Jim Lange challenged Ross as a Democrat.

=== Republican primary ===
==== Candidates ====
===== Nominee =====
- Dennis Ross, incumbent U.S. Representative

=== Democratic primary ===
==== Candidates ====
===== Nominee =====
- Jim Lange, business consultant

=== General election ===
==== Predictions ====
| Source | Ranking | As of |
|---|---|---|
| The Cook Political Report | Safe R | November 7, 2016 |
| Daily Kos Elections | Safe R | November 7, 2016 |
| Rothenberg | Safe R | November 3, 2016 |
| Sabato's Crystal Ball | Safe R | November 7, 2016 |
| RCP | Safe R | October 31, 2016 |

==== Results ====
Florida’s 15th congressional district, 2016
| Party | Candidate | Votes | % |
|---|---|---|---|
| Republican | Dennis Ross (incumbent) | 182,999 | 57.5 |
| Democratic | Jim Lange | 135,475 | 42.5 |
| Total votes | | 318,474 | 100.0 |
| Republican hold | | | |

== District 16 ==
2016 Florida's 16th congressional district election
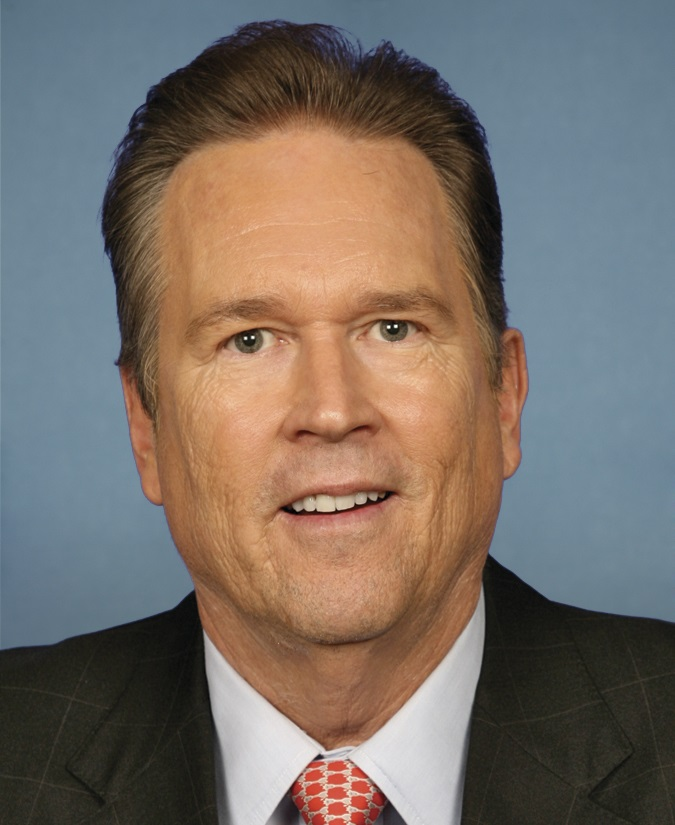

| Nominee | Vern Buchanan | Jan Schneider |
| Party | Republican | Democratic |
| Popular vote | 230,654 | 155,262 |
| Percentage | 59.8% | 40.2% |
- County results Buchanan: 50–60% 60–70%
U.S. Representative before election
Vern Buchanan
Republican
Elected U.S. Representative
Vern Buchanan
Republican

Republican Vern Buchanan had represented the district since being elected in 2012. He previously represented the 16th district from 2009 to 2013, prior to the decennial redistricting. Buchanan ran for re-election. Buchanan had previously considered running for the U.S. Senate instead.

=== Republican primary ===
If Buchanan had not run for re-election, potential Republican candidates expected to be interested in running included Senate Majority Leader Bill Galvano, State Senator Nancy Detert, former state senator Pat Neal, Manatee County Supervisor of Elections Mike Bennett, State Representative Greg Steube, and Sarasota Sheriff Tom Knight.

==== Candidates ====
===== Nominee =====
- Vern Buchanan, incumbent U.S. Representative

===== Eliminated in primary =====
- James Satcher

==== Results ====
Republican primary results
| Party | Candidate | Votes | % |
|---|---|---|---|
| Republican | Vern Buchanan (incumbent) | 53,706 | 80.6 |
| Republican | James Satcher | 12,900 | 19.4 |
| Total votes | | 66,606 | 100.0 |

=== Democratic primary ===
==== Candidates ====
===== Nominee =====
- Jan Schneider, attorney

===== Eliminated in primary =====
- Brent King, airline pilot

==== Results ====
Democratic primary results
| Party | Candidate | Votes | % |
|---|---|---|---|
| Democratic | Jan Schneider | 31,387 | 76.2 |
| Democratic | Brent King | 9,782 | 23.8 |
| Total votes | | 41,169 | 100.0 |

=== General election ===
==== Predictions ====
| Source | Ranking | As of |
|---|---|---|
| The Cook Political Report | Safe R | November 7, 2016 |
| Daily Kos Elections | Safe R | November 7, 2016 |
| Rothenberg | Safe R | November 3, 2016 |
| Sabato's Crystal Ball | Safe R | November 7, 2016 |
| RCP | Safe R | October 31, 2016 |

==== Results ====
Florida’s 16th congressional district, 2016
| Party | Candidate | Votes | % |
|---|---|---|---|
| Republican | Vern Buchanan (incumbent) | 230,654 | 59.8 |
| Democratic | Jan Schneider | 155,262 | 40.2 |
| Total votes | | 385,916 | 100.0 |
| Republican hold | | | |

== District 17 ==
2016 Florida's 17th congressional district election
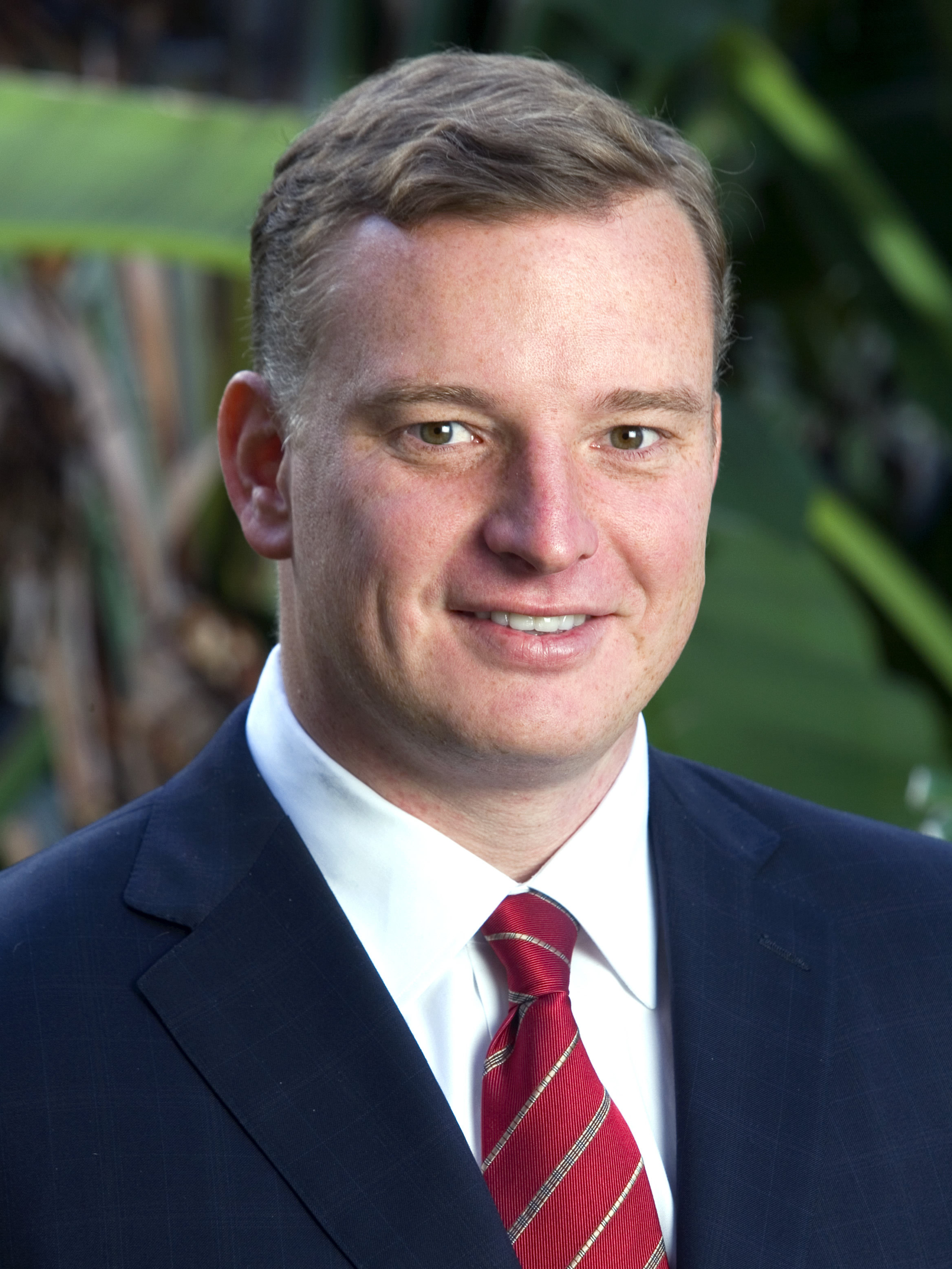

| Nominee | Tom Rooney | April Freeman |
| Party | Republican | Democratic |
| Popular vote | 209,348 | 115,974 |
| Percentage | 61.8% | 34.2% |
- County results Rooney: 50–60% 60–70%
U.S. Representative before election
Tom Rooney
Republican
Elected U.S. Representative
Tom Rooney
Republican

Republican Tom Rooney had represented the district since being elected in 2012. He previously represented the 13th district from 2007 to 2013, prior to the decennial redistricting. Rooney considered running for the U.S. Senate, but decided to run for re-election instead.

=== Republican primary ===
==== Candidates ====
===== Nominee =====
- Tom Rooney, incumbent U.S. Representative

=== Democratic primary ===
==== Candidates ====
===== Nominee =====
- April Freeman, businesswoman and nominee for the 19th district in 2014

=== General election ===
==== Predictions ====
| Source | Ranking | As of |
|---|---|---|
| The Cook Political Report | Safe R | November 7, 2016 |
| Daily Kos Elections | Safe R | November 7, 2016 |
| Rothenberg | Safe R | November 3, 2016 |
| Sabato's Crystal Ball | Safe R | November 7, 2016 |
| RCP | Safe R | October 31, 2016 |

==== Results ====
Florida’s 17th congressional district, 2016
| Party | Candidate | Votes | % |
|---|---|---|---|
| Republican | Tom Rooney (incumbent) | 209,348 | 61.8 |
| Democratic | April Freeman | 115,974 | 34.2 |
| Independent | John W Sawyer, III | 13,353 | 4.0 |
| Total votes | | 338,675 | 100.0 |
| Republican hold | | | |

== District 18 ==
2016 Florida's 18th congressional district election
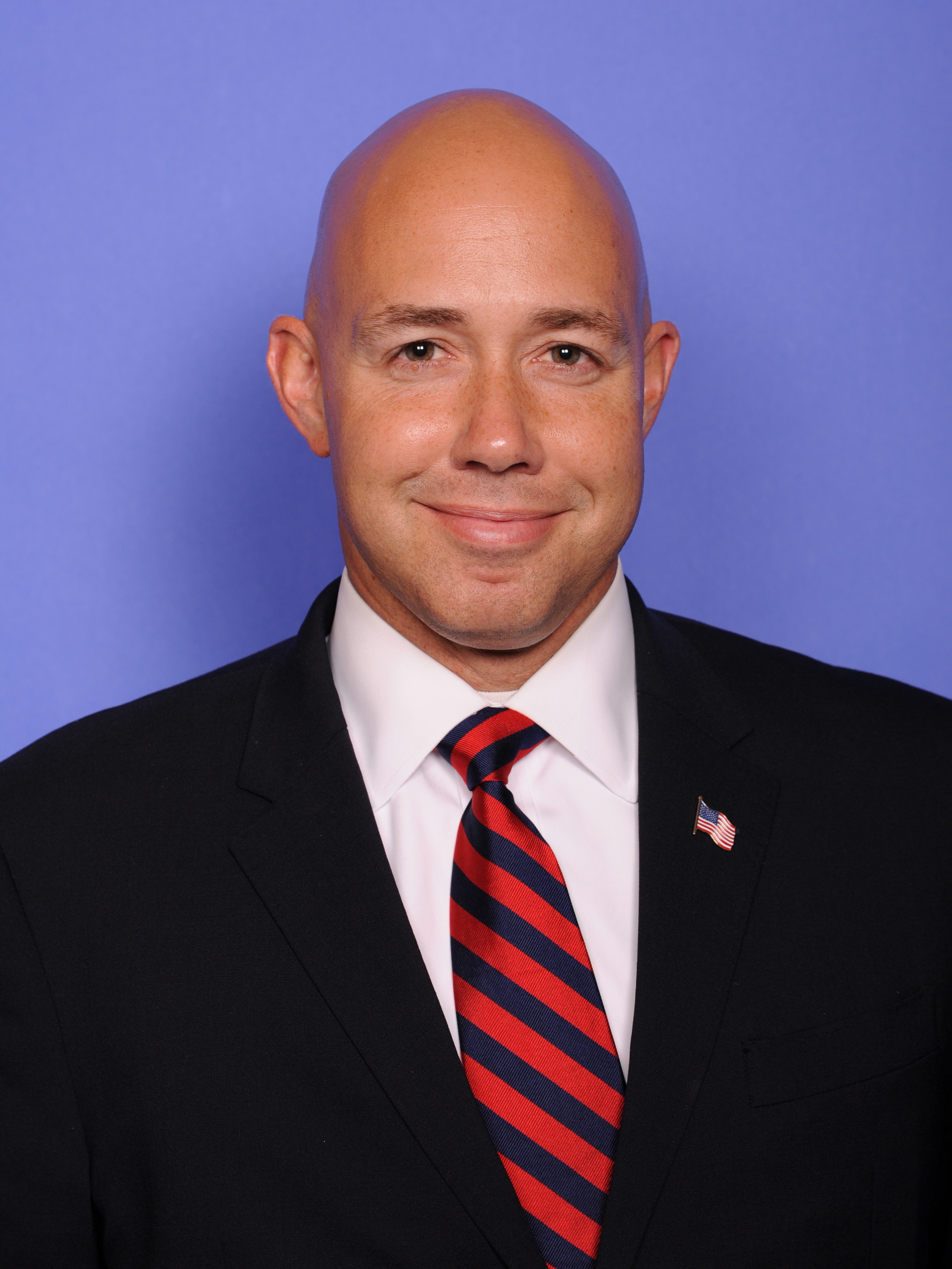

| Nominee | Brian Mast | Randy Perkins |
| Party | Republican | Democratic |
| Popular vote | 201,488 | 161,918 |
| Percentage | 53.6% | 43.1% |
- County results Mast: 40–50% 50–60% 60–70%
U.S. Representative before election
Patrick Murphy
Democratic
Elected U.S. Representative
Brian Mast
Republican

Democrat Patrick Murphy had represented the district since being elected in 2012. On March 23, 2015, he announced that he would run for U.S. Senate rather than reelection, creating an open seat. Murphy defeated Alan Grayson in the primary on August 30, 2016, and faced Marco Rubio in the November general election.

=== Democratic primary ===
==== Candidates ====
===== Nominee =====
- Randy Perkins, founder and CEO of Ashbritt

===== Eliminated in primary =====
- Jonathan Chane, attorney (endorsed Perkins in general election)
- John Xuna, scientist, engineer and Independent candidate for 22nd district in 2002

===== Withdrawn =====
- Melissa McKinlay, Palm Beach County Commissioner
- Priscilla Taylor, Palm Beach County Commissioner and former state representative

===== Declined =====
- Joseph Abruzzo, state senator
- Dave Aronberg, Palm Beach County State Attorney and former state senator
- Jeff Clemens, state senator (endorsed McKinlay)
- Chris Dzadovsky, St. Lucie County Commissioner
- Dave Kerner, state representative
- Patrick Murphy, incumbent U.S. Representative (running for U.S. Senate)

==== Endorsements ====
Jonathan Chane

State legislators

- Wendy Davis, former Texas state senator (2009–2015) and Democratic nominee for Governor of Texas in 2014
Melissa McKinlay

State legislators

- Joseph Abruzzo, state senator
- Jeff Clemens, state senator
- David Kerner, state representative
- Jeremy Ring, state senator

Local officials

- Shelley Vana, Palm Beach County commissioner
Randy Perkins

U.S. representatives

- Alcee Hastings, U.S. representative from Florida's 20th congressional district (Note: Numbered as the 23rd district from 1993 to 2013)

Organizations

- Democratic Congressional Campaign Committee

Newspapers

- The Palm Beach Post

==== Results ====
Democratic primary results
| Party | Candidate | Votes | % |
|---|---|---|---|
| Democratic | Randy Perkins | 27,861 | 60.4 |
| Democratic | Jonathan Chane | 14,897 | 32.2 |
| Democratic | Juan Xuna | 3,394 | 7.4 |
| Total votes | | 46,152 | 100.0 |

=== Republican primary ===
==== Candidates ====
===== Nominee =====
- Brian Mast, former U.S. Army bomb technician

===== Eliminated in primary =====
- Carl Domino, former state representative and nominee for this seat in 2014
- Mark Freeman, physician
- Rick Kozell, attorney
- Rebecca Negron, Martin County School Board member
- Noelle Nikpour, Republican strategist and Fox News commentator

===== Withdrawn =====
- Tod Mowery, St. Lucie County Commissioner
- Rick Roth, farmer and former Vice President of the Florida Farm Bureau
- Paul Spain, financial advisor and nominee for the 22nd district in 2014
- Carla Spalding, MSN, RN and Navy veteran (independent candidate)

===== Declined =====
- Dan Bongino, former United States Secret Service agent, nominee for U.S. Senate from Maryland in 2012 and nominee for MD-06 in 2014
- Bill Castle, general counsel to Senator Orrin Hatch
- Gayle Harrell, state representative and candidate for 16th district in 2008
- Reed Hartman, former president of the Florida Farm Bureau's State Young Farmers and Ranchers Leadership Group
- Belinda Keiser, vice chancellor at Keiser University
- K.C. Ingram Traylor, radio show host and community advocate
- Stephen Leighton, former district director for U.S. Representative Tom Rooney
- Patrick Rooney, Jr., state Representative and brother of U.S. Representative Tom Rooney
- Rob Siedlecki, attorney and 2014 State House candidate
- Doug Smith, Martin County Commissioner
- William Snyder, Martin County sheriff and former state representative
- Calvin Turnquest, former Tequesta Councilman and candidate for the seat in 2014
- Gary Uber, businessman

==== Endorsements ====
Rick Kozell

U.S. representatives

- Lincoln Díaz-Balart, former U.S. representative from Florida's 21st congressional district (1993–2011)
- Mike Rogers, U.S. representative from Alabama's 3rd congressional district

Individuals

- Eric M. Javits, former United States Permanent Representative to the Organization for the Prohibition of Chemical Weapons (2003–2009)
- George Lindemann, businessman
Rebecca Negron

Statewide officials

- Jeff Atwater, Chief Financial Officer of Florida

==== Polling ====
| Poll source | Date(s) administered | Sample size | Margin of error | Carl Domino | Mark Freeman | Brian Mast | Rebecca Negron | Undecided |
|---|---|---|---|---|---|---|---|---|
| The Logit Group (R-Mast) | August 4–7, 2016 | 364 | ± ?% | 10% | 18% | 39% | 19% | 14% |

==== Results ====
Republican primary results
| Party | Candidate | Votes | % |
|---|---|---|---|
| Republican | Brian Mast | 24,099 | 38.0 |
| Republican | Rebecca Negron | 16,242 | 25.6 |
| Republican | Mark Freeman | 10,000 | 15.6 |
| Republican | Carl Domino | 7,942 | 12.5 |
| Republican | Rick Kozell | 4,334 | 6.8 |
| Republican | Noelle Nikpour | 835 | 1.3 |
| Total votes | | 63,452 | 100.0 |

=== General election ===
==== Endorsements ====
Randy Perkins (D)

Organizations

- Democratic Congressional Campaign Committee "Red to Blue" Program
Brian Mast (R)

Organizations

- National Republican Congressional Committee "Young Guns" Program

==== Debate ====
2016 Florida's 18th congressional district Republican & Democratic primary debates (Note: The video contains both, but the debates were not held simultaneously)
| No. | Date | Host | Moderator | Link | Republican | Republican | Republican | Republican | Republican | Republican | Democratic | Democratic | Democratic |
| Key: P Participant A Absent N Not invited I Invited W Withdrawn | | | | | | | | | | | | | |
| Key: P Participant A Absent N Not invited I Invited W Withdrawn | | | | | Carl Domino | Mark Freeman | Rick Kozell | Brian Mast | Rebecca Negron | Noelle Nikpour | Jonathan Chane | Randy Perkins | Juan Xane |
|---|---|---|---|---|---|---|---|---|---|---|---|---|---|
| 1 | Aug. 28, 2016 | WPTV-TV | Michael Williams | | P | P | P | P | A | P | P | A | P |

2016 Florida's 18th congressional district debate
| No. | Date | Host | Moderator | Link | Republican | Democratic |
| Key: P Participant A Absent N Not invited I Invited W Withdrawn | | | | | | |
| Key: P Participant A Absent N Not invited I Invited W Withdrawn | | | | | Brian Mast | Randy Perkins |
|---|---|---|---|---|---|---|
| 1 | Oct. 17, 2016 | WPEC-TV; Palm Beach North Chamber of Commerce | Liz Quirantes | | P | P |
| 2 | Oct. 28, 2016 | WPTV-TV | Michael Williams | | P | P |

==== Polling ====
| Poll source | Date(s) administered | Sample size | Margin of error | Randy Perkins (D) | Brian Mast (R) | Carla Spalding (I) | Undecided |
|---|---|---|---|---|---|---|---|
| McLaughlin & Associates (R) | October 11–13, 2016 | 400 | ± 4.9% | 40% | 47% | 6% | 7% |

==== Predictions ====
| Source | Ranking | As of |
|---|---|---|
| The Cook Political Report | Lean R (flip) | November 7, 2016 |
| Daily Kos Elections | Tossup | November 7, 2016 |
| Rothenberg | Tossup | November 3, 2016 |
| Sabato's Crystal Ball | Lean R (flip) | November 7, 2016 |
| RCP | Tossup | October 31, 2016 |

==== Results ====
Mast defeated Perkins in the general election.

Florida’s 18th congressional district, 2016
| Party | Candidate | Votes | % |
|---|---|---|---|
| Republican | Brian Mast | 201,488 | 53.6 |
| Democratic | Randy Perkins | 161,918 | 43.1 |
| Independent | Carla Spalding | 12,503 | 3.3 |
| Independent | Marilyn Holloman (write-in) | 9 | 0.0 |
| Total votes | | 375,918 | 100.0 |
| Republican gain from Democratic | | | |

== District 19 ==
2016 Florida's 19th congressional district election
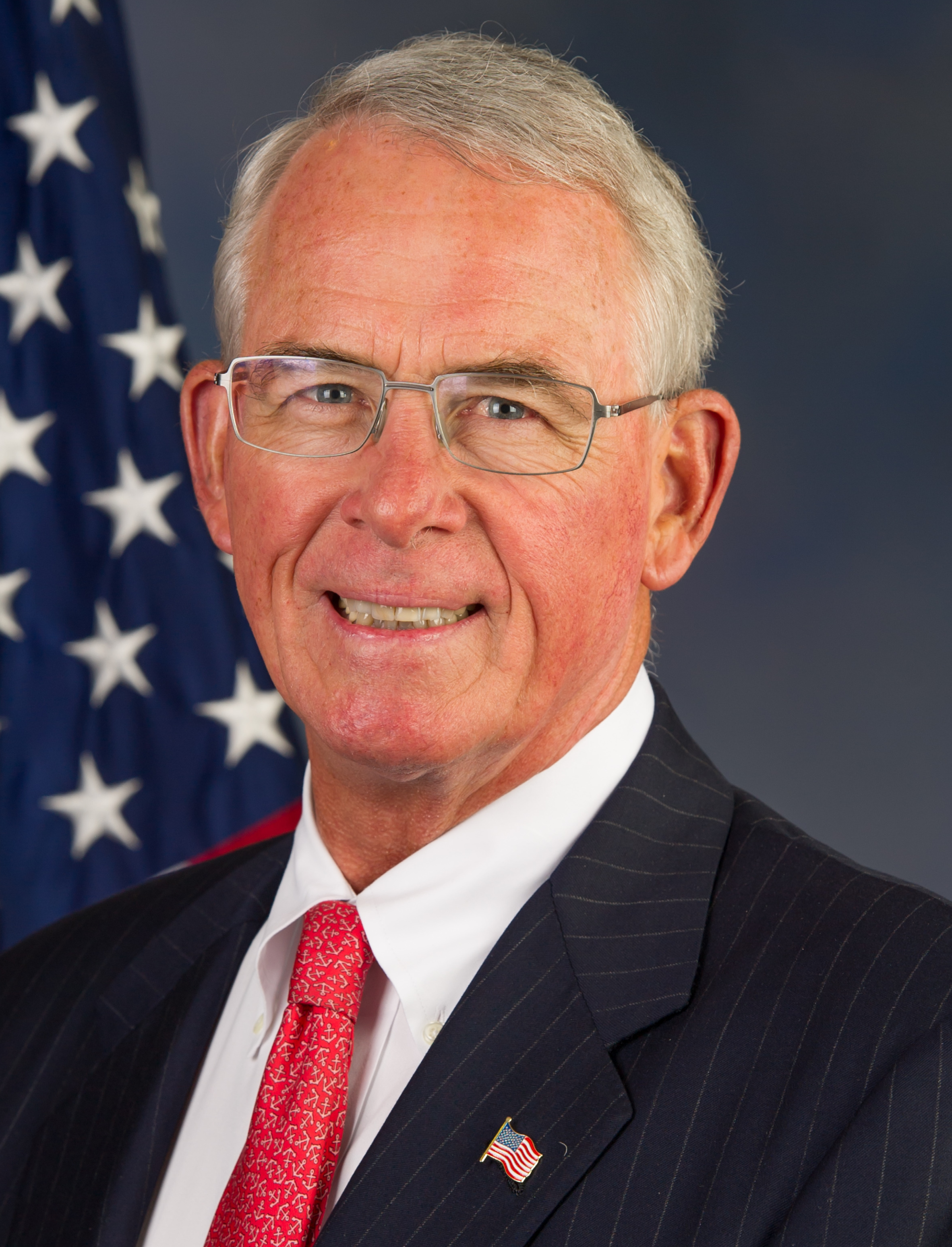

| Nominee | Francis Rooney | Robert Neeld |
| Party | Republican | Democratic |
| Popular vote | 239,225 | 123,812 |
| Percentage | 65.9% | 34.1% |
- County results Rooney: 60–70% 70–80%
U.S. Representative before election
Curt Clawson
Republican
Elected U.S. Representative
Francis Rooney
Republican

Republican Curt Clawson had represented the district since being elected in a special election in 2014. He was mentioned as a potential candidate for the U.S. Senate in 2016. In May 2016, Clawson announced he would not seek a second term.

=== Republican primary ===
==== Candidates ====
===== Nominee =====
- Francis Rooney, businessman and former U.S. ambassador to the Vatican

===== Eliminated in primary =====
- Dan Bongino, former Secret Service agent and nominee for the U.S. Senate in 2012 for Maryland
- Chauncey Goss, Sanibel council member and candidate for this seat in 2012

===== Declined =====
- Tom Grady, former state representative
- Paige Kreegel, state representative and candidate for this seat in 2012
- Tom Leonardo, Fort Myers Council member

==== Endorsements ====
Dan Bongino

U.S. Senators

- Ted Cruz, U.S. Senator from Texas and 2016 Republican presidential candidate

==== Forum ====
2016 Florida's 19th congressional district republican primary candidate forum
| No. | Date | Host | Moderator | Link | Republican | Republican | Republican |
| Key: P Participant A Absent N Not invited I Invited W Withdrawn | | | | | | | |
| Key: P Participant A Absent N Not invited I Invited W Withdrawn | | | | | Dan Bongino | Chauncey Goss | Francis Rooney |
|---|---|---|---|---|---|---|---|
| 1 | Aug. 22, 2016 | Naples Daily News | Amy Oshier | | P | P | P |

==== Polling ====
| Poll source | Date(s) administered | Sample size | Margin of error | Dan Bongino | Chauncey Goss | Francis Rooney | Undecided |
|---|---|---|---|---|---|---|---|
| Remington Research Group (R) | August 4–7, 2016 | 364 | – | 15% | 29% | 45% | 11% |

==== Results ====
Republican primary results
| Party | Candidate | Votes | % |
|---|---|---|---|
| Republican | Francis Rooney | 46,821 | 52.7 |
| Republican | Chauncey Goss | 26,537 | 29.9 |
| Republican | Dan Bongino | 15,439 | 17.4 |
| Total votes | | 88,797 | 100.0 |

=== Democratic primary ===
==== Candidates ====
===== Nominee =====
- Robert Neeld

===== Declined =====
- April Freeman, businesswoman and nominee for this seat in 2014

=== General election ===
==== Predictions ====
| Source | Ranking | As of |
|---|---|---|
| The Cook Political Report | Safe R | November 7, 2016 |
| Daily Kos Elections | Safe R | November 7, 2016 |
| Rothenberg | Safe R | November 3, 2016 |
| Sabato's Crystal Ball | Safe R | November 7, 2016 |
| RCP | Safe R | October 31, 2016 |

==== Results ====
Florida’s 19th congressional district, 2016
| Party | Candidate | Votes | % |
|---|---|---|---|
| Republican | Francis Rooney | 239,225 | 65.9 |
| Democratic | Robert Neeld | 123,812 | 34.1 |
| Independent | David Byron (write-in) | 109 | 0.0 |
| Independent | Timothy John Rossano (write-in) | 20 | 0.0 |
| Total votes | | 363,166 | 100.0 |
| Republican hold | | | |

== District 20 ==
2016 Florida's 20th congressional district election
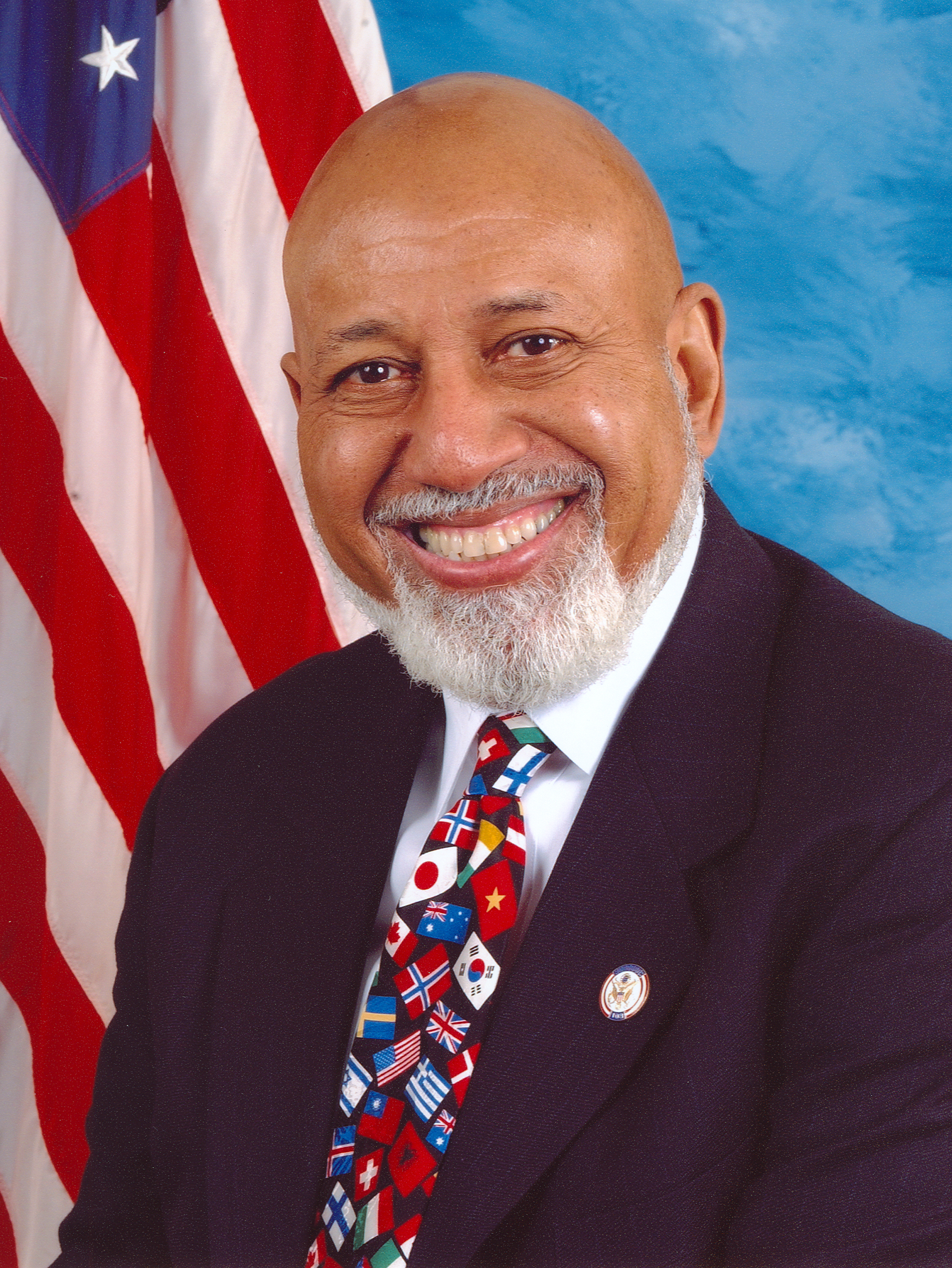

| Nominee | Alcee Hastings | Gary Stein |
| Party | Democratic | Republican |
| Popular vote | 222,914 | 54,646 |
| Percentage | 80.3% | 19.7% |
- County results Hastings: 70–80% 80–90%
U.S. Representative before election
Alcee Hastings
Democratic
Elected U.S. Representative
Alcee Hastings
Democratic

Democrat Alcee Hastings had represented the district since being elected in 2012. He previously represented the 23rd district from 1993 to 2013, prior to the decennial redistricting. Hastings announced in November 2014 that he would run for re-election in 2016.

=== Democratic primary ===
==== Candidates ====
===== Nominee =====
- Alcee Hastings, incumbent U.S. Representative

=== Republican primary ===
==== Candidates ====
===== Nominee =====
- Gary Stein

=== General election ===
==== Predictions ====
| Source | Ranking | As of |
|---|---|---|
| The Cook Political Report | Safe D | November 7, 2016 |
| Daily Kos Elections | Safe D | November 7, 2016 |
| Rothenberg | Safe D | November 3, 2016 |
| Sabato's Crystal Ball | Safe D | November 7, 2016 |
| RCP | Safe D | October 31, 2016 |

==== Results ====
Florida’s 20th congressional district, 2016
| Party | Candidate | Votes | % |
|---|---|---|---|
| Democratic | Alcee Hastings (incumbent) | 222,914 | 80.3 |
| Republican | Gary Stein | 54,646 | 19.7 |
| Total votes | | 277,560 | 100.0 |
| Democratic hold | | | |

== District 21 ==
2016 Florida's 21st congressional district election
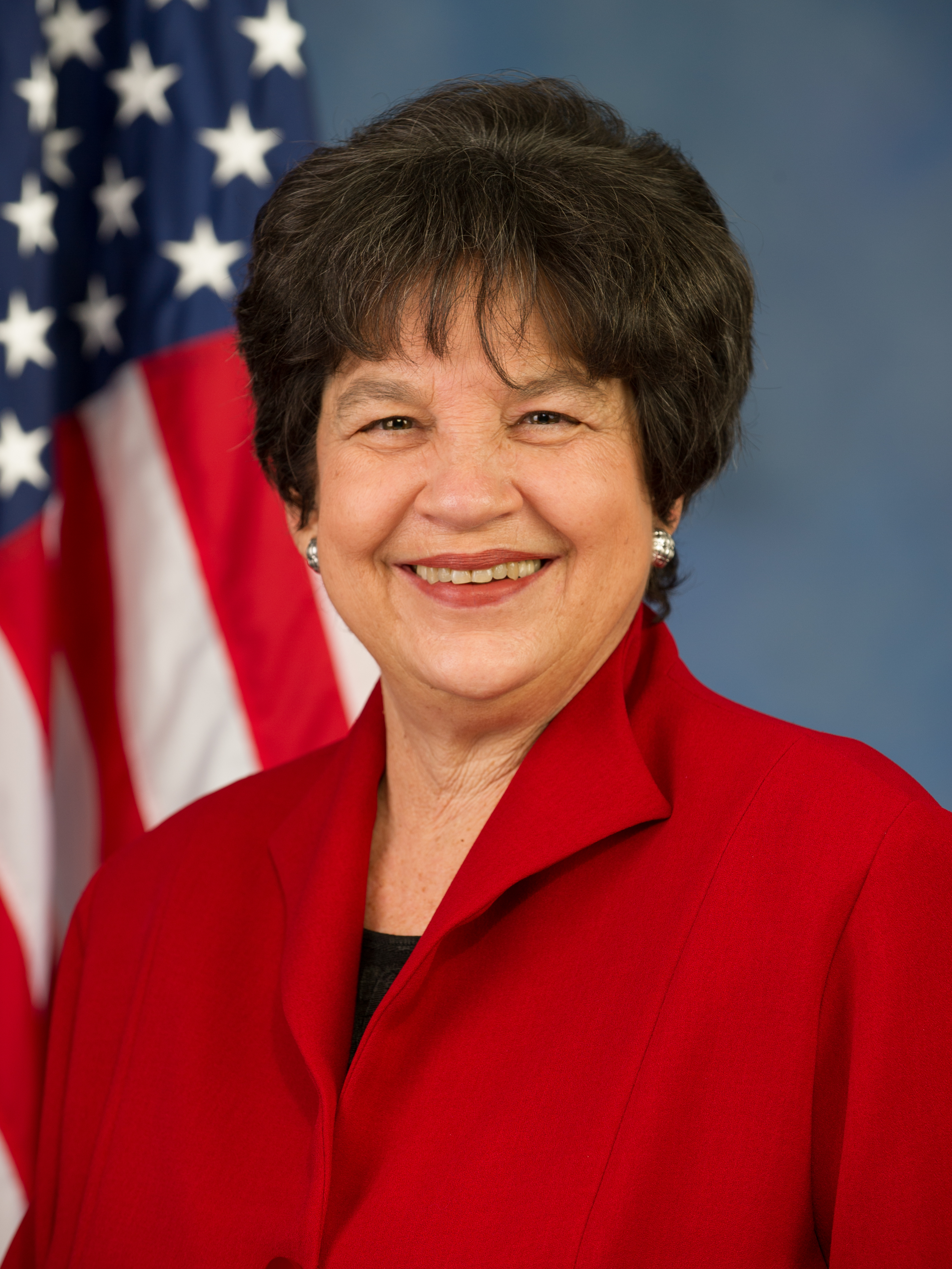

| Nominee | Lois Frankel | Paul Spain |
| Party | Democratic | Republican |
| Popular vote | 210,606 | 118,038 |
| Percentage | 62.7% | 35.1% |
- County results Frankel: 60–70%
U.S. Representative before election
Lois Frankel (22nd)
Democratic
Elected U.S. Representative
Lois Frankel
Democratic

Democrat Ted Deutch had represented the district since being elected in 2012. He previously represented the 19th district from 2010 to 2013, prior to the decennial redistricting. Deutch considered running for the U.S. Senate, but decided to run for re-election instead. If Deutch had run for Senate, State Senator Joseph Abruzzo was interested in running for this seat.

As a result of 2015's statewide redistricting, incumbent Deutch effectively swapped seats with Lois Frankel, then incumbent of the 22nd District. Deutch would seek election to the 22nd District seat while Frankel sought election to District 21.

=== Democratic primary ===
==== Candidates ====
===== Nominee =====
- Lois Frankel, incumbent U.S. Representative

=== Republican primary ===
==== Candidates ====
===== Nominee =====
- Paul Spain

=== General election ===
==== Predictions ====
| Source | Ranking | As of |
|---|---|---|
| The Cook Political Report | Safe D | November 7, 2016 |
| Daily Kos Elections | Safe D | November 7, 2016 |
| Rothenberg | Safe D | November 3, 2016 |
| Sabato's Crystal Ball | Safe D | November 7, 2016 |
| RCP | Safe D | October 31, 2016 |

==== Results ====
Florida’s 21st congressional district, 2016
| Party | Candidate | Votes | % |
|---|---|---|---|
| Democratic | Lois Frankel (incumbent) | 210,606 | 62.7 |
| Republican | Paul Spain | 118,038 | 35.1 |
| Independent | W Michael "Mike" Trout | 7,217 | 2.2 |
| Total votes | | 335,861 | 100.0 |
| Democratic hold | | | |

== District 22 ==
2016 Florida's 22nd congressional district election
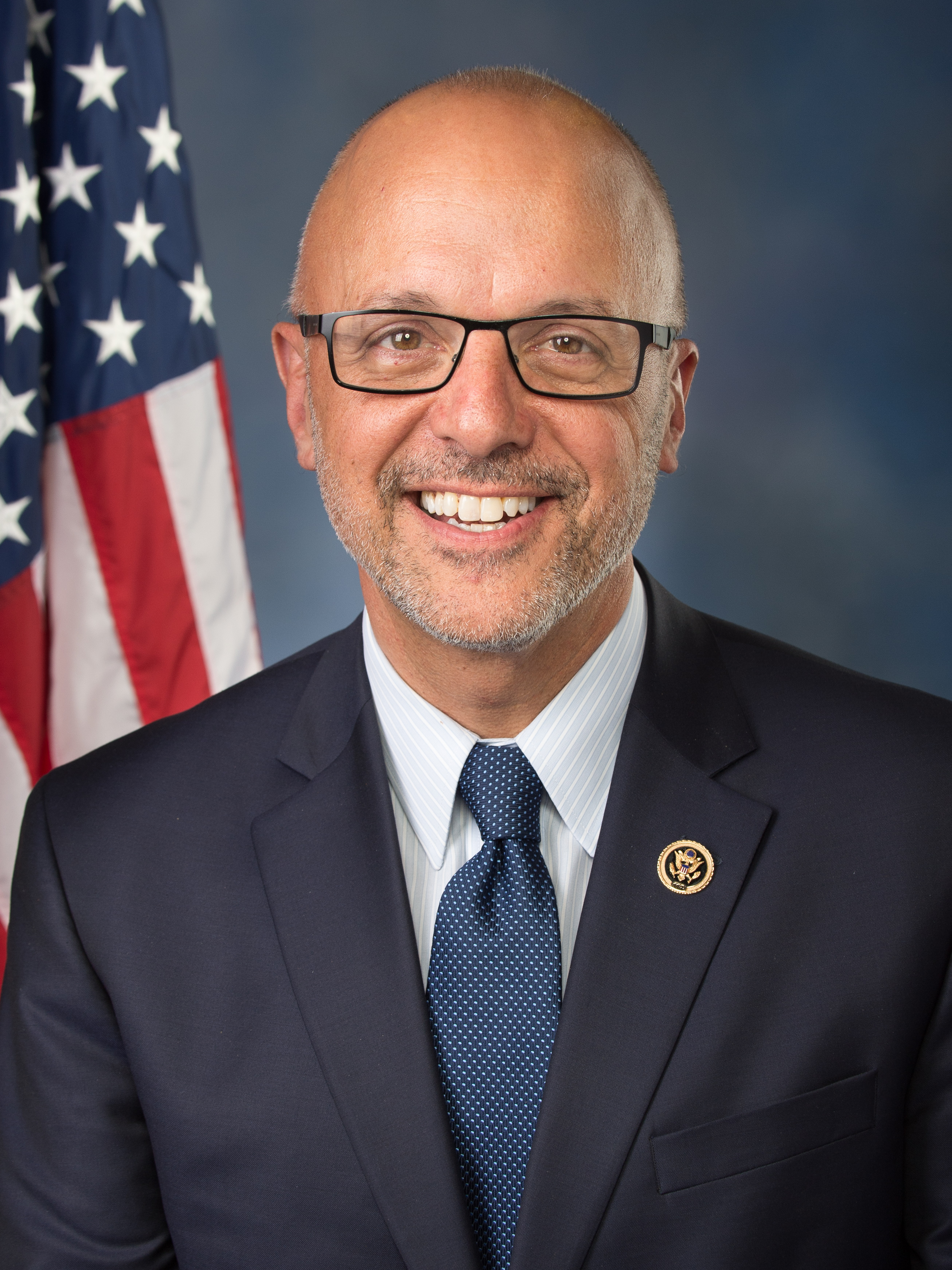

| Nominee | Ted Deutch | Andrea Leigh McGee |
| Party | Democratic | Republican |
| Popular vote | 199,113 | 138,737 |
| Percentage | 58.9% | 41.1% |
- County results Deutch: 50–60% 60–70%
U.S. Representative before election
Ted Deutch (21st)
Democratic
Elected U.S. Representative
Ted Deutch
Democratic

Democrat Lois Frankel had represented the district since being elected in 2012. As a result of 2015's statewide redistricting, incumbent Frankel would effectively swap seats with Ted Deutch, the current incumbent of the 21st District. Frankel sought election to the 21st District seat while Deutch sought election to District 22.

=== Democratic primary ===
==== Candidates ====
===== Nominee =====
- Ted Deutch

=== Republican primary ===
Boca Raton businessman Joseph Bensmihen was challenging Frankel as a Republican. Physician Marc Freeman had also filed to run as a Republican, but switched to run in the 18th district.

==== Candidates ====
===== Nominee =====
- Andrea Leigh McGee

===== Withdrawn =====
- Joseph Bensmihen, businessman
- Marc Freeman, physician

=== General election ===
==== Predictions ====
| Source | Ranking | As of |
|---|---|---|
| The Cook Political Report | Safe D | November 7, 2016 |
| Daily Kos Elections | Safe D | November 7, 2016 |
| Rothenberg | Safe D | November 3, 2016 |
| Sabato's Crystal Ball | Safe D | November 7, 2016 |
| RCP | Safe D | October 31, 2016 |

==== Results ====
Florida’s 22nd congressional district, 2016
| Party | Candidate | Votes | % |
|---|---|---|---|
| Democratic | Ted Deutch (incumbent) | 199,113 | 58.9 |
| Republican | Andrea Leigh McGee | 138,737 | 41.1 |
| Total votes | | 337,850 | 100.0 |
| Democratic hold | | | |

== District 23 ==
2016 Florida's 23rd congressional district election
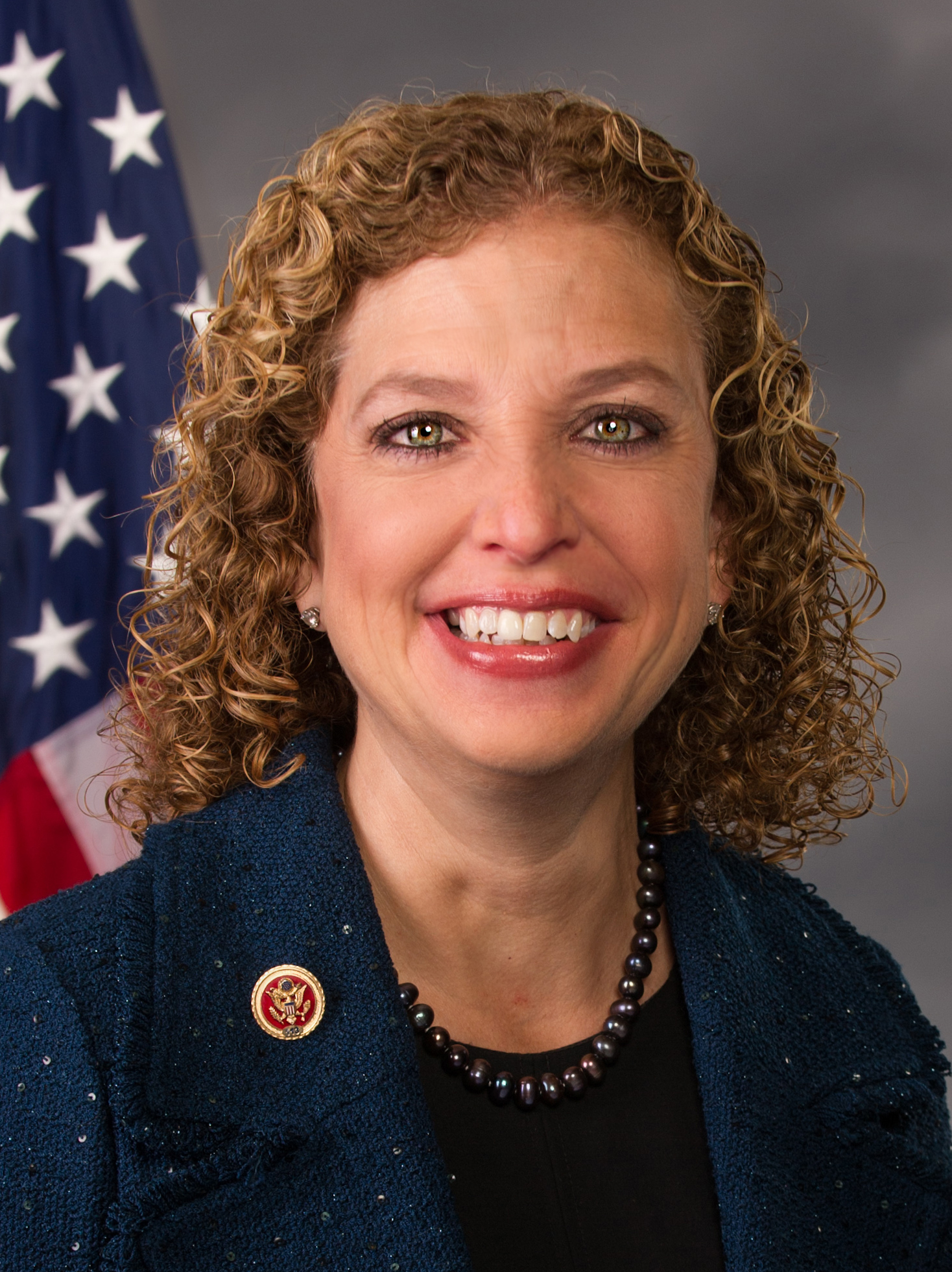

| Nominee | Debbie Wasserman Schultz | Joe Kaufman |
| Party | Democratic | Republican |
| Popular vote | 183,225 | 130,818 |
| Percentage | 56.7% | 40.5% |
- County results Schultz: 50–60%
U.S. Representative before election
Debbie Wasserman Schultz
Democratic
Elected U.S. Representative
Debbie Wasserman Schultz
Democratic

Democrat Debbie Wasserman Schultz had represented the district since being elected in 2012. She previously represented the 20th district from 2005 to 2013, prior to the decennial redistricting.

=== Democratic primary ===
==== Candidates ====
===== Nominee =====
- Debbie Wasserman Schultz, incumbent U.S. Representative

===== Eliminated in primary =====
- Tim Canova, attorney and professor at Nova Southeastern University

===== Declined =====
- Martin Karp, Miami-Dade School Board member

==== Endorsements ====
Tim Canova

U.S. Senators

- Bernie Sanders, U.S. Senator from Vermont and 2016 Democratic presidential candidate

Labor unions

- Communications Workers of America
- National Nurses United
- Transport Workers Union of America
- United Association of Pipefitters, Air Conditioning, and Refrigeration

Organizations

- Democracy for America, progressive organization
- Mayday PAC, political action committee founded by Lawrence Lessig to help elect candidates to Congress to pass campaign finance reform
- National Organization for the Reform of Marijuana Laws, non-profit organization supporting the legalization of marijuana
- Progressive Democrats of America, progressive coalition
- Working Families Party, progressive minor political party

Newspapers

- The Miami Times
- The Westside Gazette

Individuals

- Ben Cohen, co-founder of Ben & Jerry's ice cream
Debbie Wasserman Schultz

U.S. Executive Branch officials

- Joe Biden, 47th Vice President of the United States
- Hillary Clinton, former Secretary of State and 2016 Democratic presidential nominee
- Barack Obama, 44th President of the United States

Organizations

- Broward County Central Labor Council, local AFL–CIO body
- Broward County Council of Professional Firefighters, local firefighter union
- Congressional Black Caucus
- EMILY's List
- League of Conservation Voters

Newspapers

- Miami Herald
- Sun-Sentinel

==== Polling ====
| Poll source | Date(s) administered | Sample size | Margin of error | Debbie Wasserman Schultz | Tim Canova | Undecided |
|---|---|---|---|---|---|---|
| Florida Atlantic University | August 17–19, 2016 | 400 | ± 5% | 50% | 40% | 10% |
| Global Strategy Group (D-Wasserman Schultz) | July 31–August 1, 2016 | 400 | ± 4.9% | 59% | 26% | 15% |
| FM3 Research (D-Canova) | July 27–28, 2016 | 400 | ± 4.9% | 46% | 38% | 16% |

==== Results ====
Democratic primary results
| Party | Candidate | Votes | % |
|---|---|---|---|
| Democratic | Debbie Wasserman Schultz (incumbent) | 28,809 | 56.8 |
| Democratic | Tim Canova | 21,907 | 43.2 |
| Total votes | | 50,716 | 100.0 |

=== Republican primary ===
==== Candidates ====
- Joe Kaufman, counter-terrorism researcher, founder of Americans Against Hate, candidate for this seat 2012 and nominee in 2014

===== Eliminated in primary =====
- Marty Feigenbaum, attorney and public arbitrator for the Financial Industry Regulatory Authority

==== Results ====
Republican primary results
| Party | Candidate | Votes | % |
|---|---|---|---|
| Republican | Joe Kaufman | 13,412 | 73.0 |
| Republican | Martin "Marty" Feigenbaum | 4,948 | 27.0 |
| Total votes | | 18,360 | 100.0 |

=== General election ===
==== Predictions ====
| Source | Ranking | As of |
|---|---|---|
| The Cook Political Report | Safe D | November 7, 2016 |
| Daily Kos Elections | Safe D | November 7, 2016 |
| Rothenberg | Safe D | November 3, 2016 |
| Sabato's Crystal Ball | Safe D | November 7, 2016 |
| RCP | Safe D | October 31, 2016 |

==== Results ====
Florida’s 23rd congressional district, 2016
| Party | Candidate | Votes | % |
|---|---|---|---|
| Democratic | Debbie Wasserman Schultz (incumbent) | 183,225 | 56.7 |
| Republican | Joe Kaufman | 130,818 | 40.5 |
| Independent | Don Endriss | 5,180 | 1.6 |
| Independent | Lyle Milstein | 3,897 | 1.2 |
| Total votes | | 323,120 | 100.0 |
| Democratic hold | | | |

== District 24 ==
2016 Florida's 24th congressional district election
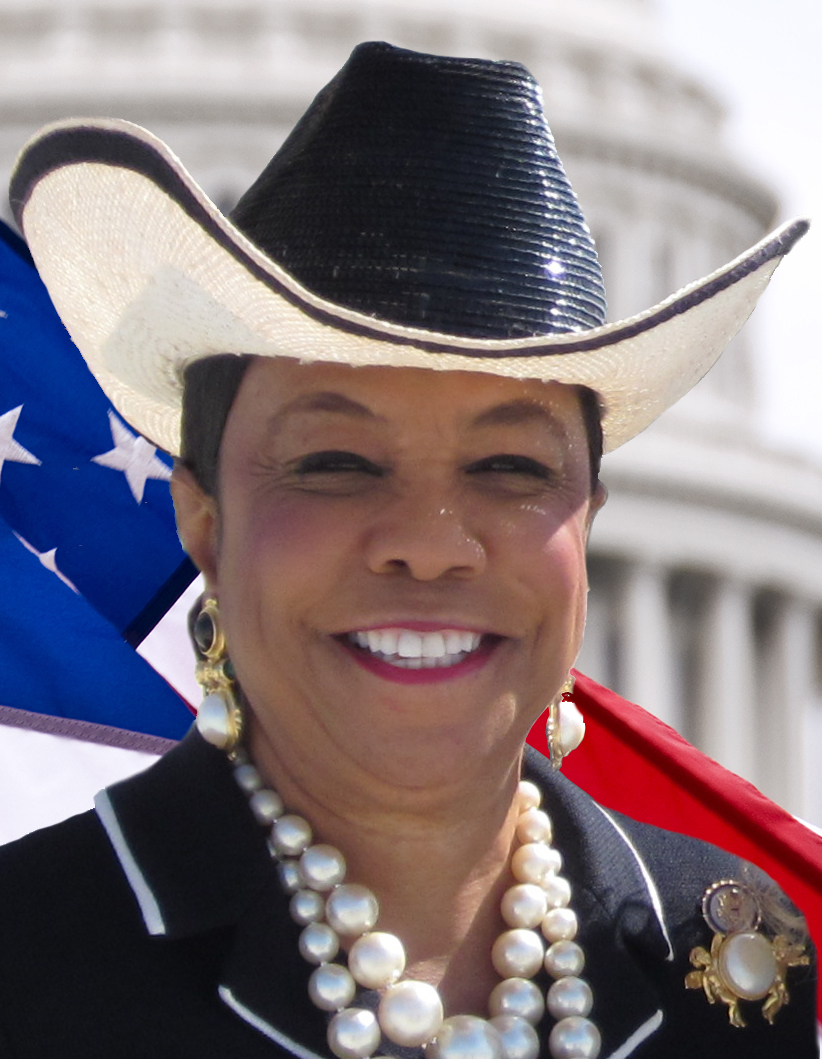
| Nominee | Frederica Wilson |
| Party | Democratic |
| Popular vote | Unopposed |
| Percentage | N/a |
U.S. Representative before election
Frederica Wilson
Democratic
Elected U.S. Representative
Frederica Wilson
Democratic

Democrat Frederica Wilson had represented the district since being elected in 2012. She previously represented the 17th district from 2011 to 2013, prior to the decennial redistricting.

=== Democratic primary ===
==== Candidates ====
===== Nominee =====
- Frederica Wilson, incumbent U.S. Representative

===== Eliminated in primary =====
- Randal Hill, retired NFL player and former U.S. Homeland Security agent

==== Results ====
Democratic primary results
| Party | Candidate | Votes | % |
|---|---|---|---|
| Democratic | Frederica Wilson (incumbent) | 50,822 | 78.4 |
| Democratic | Randal Hill | 14,023 | 21.6 |
| Total votes | | 64,845 | 100.0 |

=== General election ===
==== Predictions ====
| Source | Ranking | As of |
|---|---|---|
| The Cook Political Report | Safe D | November 7, 2016 |
| Daily Kos Elections | Safe D | November 7, 2016 |
| Rothenberg | Safe D | November 3, 2016 |
| Sabato's Crystal Ball | Safe D | November 7, 2016 |
| RCP | Safe D | October 31, 2016 |

==== Results ====
Democrat Frederica Wilson was unopposed in the general election.

Florida's 24th congressional district, 2016
| Party | Candidate | Votes | % |
|---|---|---|---|
| Democratic | Frederica Wilson (incumbent) | Unopposed | N/a |
| Total votes | | | N/a |
| Democratic hold | | | |

== District 25 ==
2016 Florida's 25th congressional district election
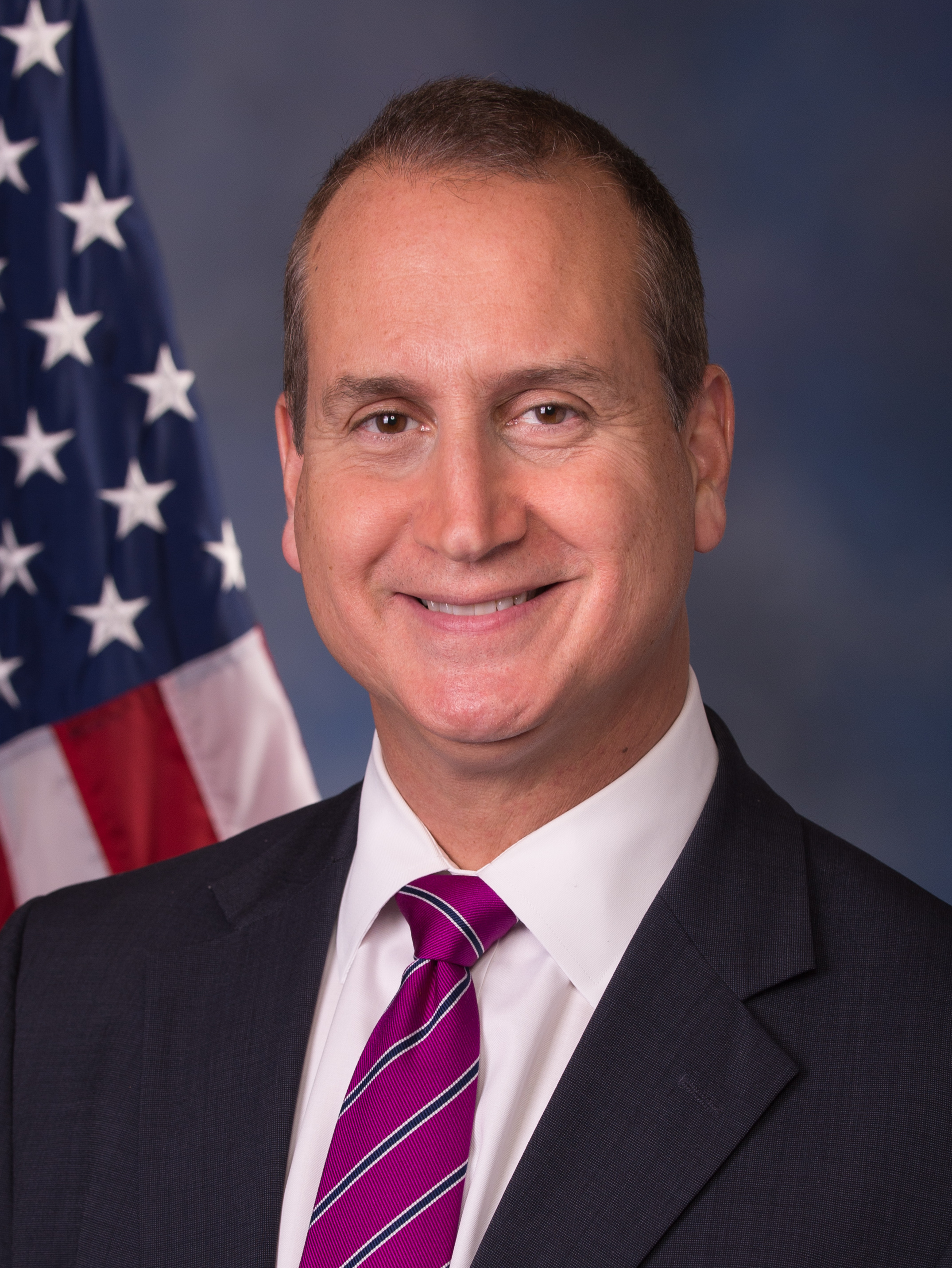

| Nominee | Mario Díaz-Balart | Alina Valdes |
| Party | Republican | Democratic |
| Popular vote | 157,921 | 95,319 |
| Percentage | 62.4% | 37.6% |
- County results Díaz-Balart: 50–60% 60–70%
U.S. Representative before election
Mario Díaz-Balart
Republican
Elected U.S. Representative
Mario Díaz-Balart
Republican

Republican Mario Díaz-Balart had represented the district since 2012. He previously represented the 21st district from 2011 to 2013, as well as a different version of the 25th from 2003 to 2011, prior to the decennial redistricting.

=== Republican primary ===
==== Candidates ====
===== Nominee =====
- Mario Díaz-Balart, incumbent U.S. Representative

=== Democratic primary ===
==== Candidates ====
===== Nominee =====
- Alina Valdes, physician

=== General election ===
==== Predictions ====
| Source | Ranking | As of |
|---|---|---|
| The Cook Political Report | Safe R | November 7, 2016 |
| Daily Kos Elections | Safe R | November 7, 2016 |
| Rothenberg | Safe R | November 3, 2016 |
| Sabato's Crystal Ball | Safe R | November 7, 2016 |
| RCP | Safe R | October 31, 2016 |

==== Results ====
Florida's 25th congressional district, 2016
| Party | Candidate | Votes | % |
|---|---|---|---|
| Republican | Mario Díaz-Balart (incumbent) | 157,921 | 62.4 |
| Democratic | Alina Valdes | 95,319 | 37.6 |
| Total votes | | 253,240 | 100.0 |
| Republican hold | | | |

== District 26 ==
2016 Florida's 26th congressional district election
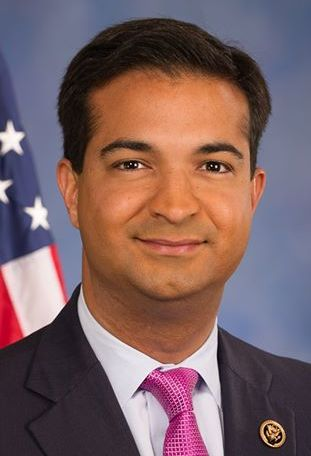

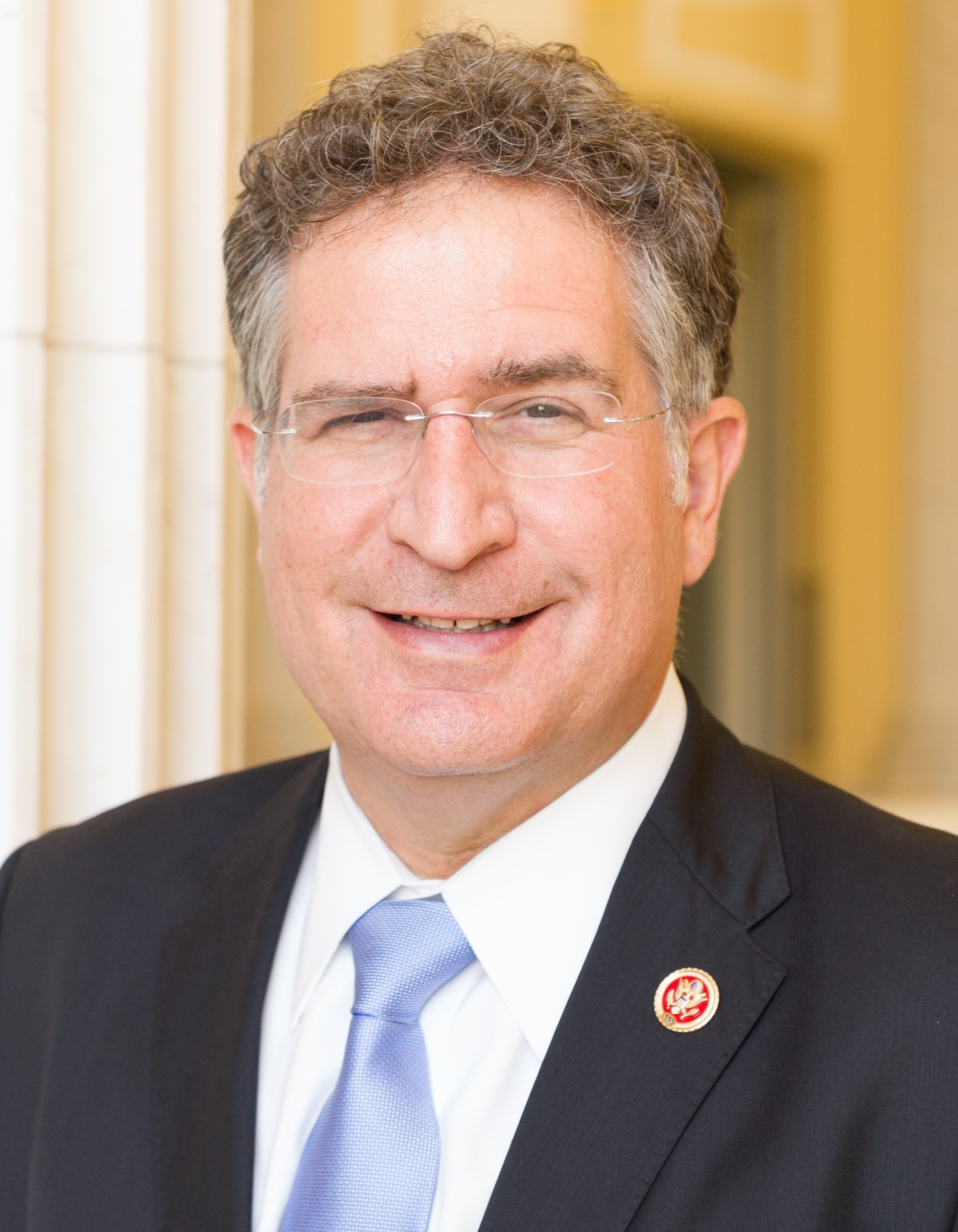

| Nominee | Carlos Curbelo | Joe Garcia | José Peixoto |
| Party | Republican | Democratic | Independent |
| Popular vote | 148,547 | 115,493 | 16,502 |
| Percentage | 52.9% | 41.2% | 5.9% |
- County results Curbelo: 50–60%
U.S. Representative before election
Carlos Curbelo
Republican
Elected U.S. Representative
Carlos Curbelo
Republican

Republican Carlos Curbelo had represented the district since being elected in 2014.

=== Democratic primary ===
==== Candidates ====
===== Nominee =====
- Joe Garcia, former U.S. Representative

===== Eliminated in primary =====
- Annette Taddeo, businesswoman, nominee for the 18th district in 2008 and nominee for Lieutenant Governor in 2014

==== Polling ====
| Poll source | Date(s) administered | Sample size | Margin of error | Joe Garcia | Annette Taddeo | Undecided |
|---|---|---|---|---|---|---|
| GBA Strategies (D) | July 11–14, 2016 | 400 | ± 4.9% | 40% | 38% | 22% |
| Expedition Strategies (D-Garcia) | May 10–13, 2016 | 400 | ± 4.90% | 53% | 28% | 19% |
| ALG Research (D-Taddeo) | April 2016 | 400 | ± 4.4% | 48% | 27% | 25% |
| Public Policy Polling (D) | January 15–18, 2016 | 441 | – | 34% | 24% | 42% |

==== Debate ====
2016 Florida's 26th congressional district democratic primary debate
| No. | Date | Host | Moderator | Link | Democratic | Democratic |
| Key: P Participant A Absent N Not invited I Invited W Withdrawn | | | | | | |
| Key: P Participant A Absent N Not invited I Invited W Withdrawn | | | | | Joe Garcia | Annette Taddeo |
|---|---|---|---|---|---|---|
| 1 | | WPLG | Michael Putney | | P | P |

==== Results ====
Democratic primary results
| Party | Candidate | Votes | % |
|---|---|---|---|
| Democratic | Joe Garcia | 14,834 | 51.2 |
| Democratic | Annette Taddeo | 14,108 | 48.8 |
| Total votes | | 28,942 | 100.0 |

=== General election ===
==== Debate ====
2016 Florida's 26th congressional district debate
| No. | Date | Host | Moderator | Link | Republican | Democratic |
| Key: P Participant A Absent N Not invited I Invited W Withdrawn | | | | | | |
| Key: P Participant A Absent N Not invited I Invited W Withdrawn | | | | | Carlos Curbelo | Joe Garcia |
|---|---|---|---|---|---|---|
| 1 | Oct. 20, 2016 | WPLG | Michael Putney | | P | P |

==== Endorsements ====
Carlos Curbelo (R)

Organizations

- National Republican Congressional Committee "Patriot" Program
Joe Garcia (D)

Organizations

- Democratic Congressional Campaign Committee "Red to Blue" Program

==== Predictions ====
| Source | Ranking | As of |
|---|---|---|
| The Cook Political Report | Tossup | November 7, 2016 |
| Daily Kos Elections | Tossup | November 7, 2016 |
| Rothenberg | Tossup | November 3, 2016 |
| Sabato's Crystal Ball | Lean R | November 7, 2016 |
| RCP | Tossup | October 31, 2016 |

==== Results ====
Florida’s 26th congressional district, 2016
| Party | Candidate | Votes | % |
|---|---|---|---|
| Republican | Carlos Curbelo (incumbent) | 148,547 | 52.9 |
| Democratic | Joe Garcia | 115,493 | 41.2 |
| Independent | José Peixoto | 16,502 | 5.9 |
| Total votes | | 280,542 | 100.0 |
| Republican hold | | | |

== District 27 ==
2016 Florida's 27th congressional district election
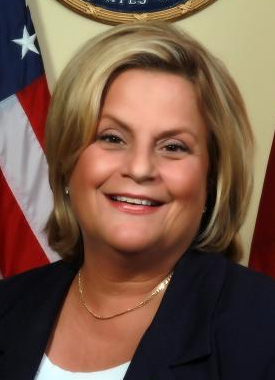

| Nominee | Ileana Ros-Lehtinen | Scott Fuhrman |
| Party | Republican | Democratic |
| Popular vote | 157,917 | 129,760 |
| Percentage | 54.9% | 45.1% |
- Precinct results Ros-Lehtinen: 50–60% 60–70% 70–80% 80–90% >90% Fuhrman: 50–60% 60–70% 70–80% 80–90% >90% Tie: 50% No votes
U.S. Representative before election
Ileana Ros-Lehtinen
Republican
Elected U.S. Representative
Ileana Ros-Lehtinen
Republican

Republican Ileana Ros-Lehtinen represented the district since being elected in 2012. She previously represented the 18th district from 1989 to 2013, prior to the decennial redistricting.

=== Republican primary ===
==== Candidates ====
===== Nominee =====
- Ileana Ros-Lehtinen, incumbent U.S. Representative

===== Eliminated in primary =====
- David Adams
- Maria Peiro

==== Results ====
Republican primary results
| Party | Candidate | Votes | % |
|---|---|---|---|
| Republican | Ileana Ros-Lehtinen (incumbent) | 30,485 | 80.5 |
| Republican | Maria Peiro | 4,450 | 11.3 |
| Republican | David "Tubbs" Adams | 2,945 | 7.8 |
| Total votes | | 37,880 | 100.0 |

=== Democratic primary ===
==== Candidates ====
===== Nominee =====
- Scott Fuhrman, businessman

===== Eliminated in primary =====
- Frank Perez, US Army veteran
- Adam Sackrin, attorney

==== Results ====
Democratic primary results
| Party | Candidate | Votes | % |
|---|---|---|---|
| Democratic | Scott Fuhrman | 17,068 | 58.9 |
| Democratic | Frank Perez | 7,087 | 24.5 |
| Democratic | Adam Sackrin | 4,808 | 16.6 |
| Total votes | | 28,963 | 100.0 |

=== General election ===
==== Predictions ====
| Source | Ranking | As of |
|---|---|---|
| The Cook Political Report | Likely R | November 7, 2016 |
| Daily Kos Elections | Safe R | November 7, 2016 |
| Rothenberg | Safe R | November 3, 2016 |
| Sabato's Crystal Ball | Safe R | November 7, 2016 |
| RCP | Likely R | October 31, 2016 |

==== Results ====
Florida’s 27th congressional district, 2016
| Party | Candidate | Votes | % |
|---|---|---|---|
| Republican | Ileana Ros-Lehtinen (incumbent) | 157,917 | 54.9 |
| Democratic | Scott Fuhrman | 129,760 | 45.1 |
| Total votes | | 287,677 | 100.0 |
| Republican hold | | | |

== See also ==
- 2016 United States House of Representatives elections
- 2016 United States elections

== Notes ==
Partisan clients
