= 2022 Florida gubernatorial election =

- November 8, 2022
- Turnout: 53.8% ▼8.8 pp

Nominee	Ron DeSantis	Charlie Crist
Party	Republican	Democratic
Running mate	Jeanette Nuñez	Karla Hernández-Mats
Popular vote	4,614,210	3,106,313
Percentage	59.37%	39.97%
- DeSantis: 40–50% 50–60% 60–70% 70–80% 80–90% >90% Crist: 40–50% 50–60% 60–70% 70–80% 80–90% >90% Tie: 40–50% 50% No votes
Governor before election
Ron DeSantis
Republican
Elected Governor
Ron DeSantis
Republican

The 2022 Florida gubernatorial election was held on November 8, 2022, to elect the governor of Florida, alongside other state and local elections. Incumbent Republican Governor Ron DeSantis won re-election in a landslide, defeating the Democratic Party nominee, Charlie Crist, who served as governor of Florida from 2007 to 2011 as a Republican and later as an independent. No Democrat has been elected governor of Florida since 1994.

With 59.4 percent of the vote, DeSantis won the largest margin of victory in a Florida gubernatorial election since 1982. Significantly, DeSantis won Miami-Dade County, which had been considered a Democratic stronghold and had last voted Republican in 2002, and Palm Beach County, which had not voted Republican since 1986. Crist conceded the election shortly after DeSantis was projected as the winner. DeSantis won eight counties he lost in 2018.

According to exit polls, DeSantis won 65% of White voters, 13% of Black voters, and 58% of Latinos; of the latter group, DeSantis won 69% of Cubans and 56% of Puerto Ricans. DeSantis also won a majority of Latina women in Florida.

DeSantis's large margin of victory was in part due to him flipping Democratic stronghold Miami-Dade County for the first time since 2002, and Palm Beach County for the first time since 1986, as well as winning Hillsborough, Osceola, Pinellas, and St. Lucie counties for the first time since 2006. This was also the first gubernatorial election since 2006 in which a candidate received over 50% of the vote. His 19.4% margin of victory was the largest since 1982 and the largest for a Republican in state history, compared to 0.4% four years earlier. It was also the first time the governorship was won by double digits since 2002, and the first time it was won by over a million votes.

Significantly, Crist's 39.97% performance was the worst for a Democratic nominee for governor of Florida since 1916, a three candidate race. Republicans won all other statewide races by double digits; this is the first time since the end of Reconstruction that Democrats do not hold at least one of the statewide positions. DeSantis also made large gains among Hispanic voters, becoming the first Florida Republican in decades to win a majority of those voters. He also had a major fundraising advantage over Crist, setting an all-time record for a gubernatorial candidate.

Some analysts believe that this election marked the transition of Florida from being a swing state into a red state. Donald Trump would win Florida in 2024 by 13 percentage points, far exceeding his two prior performances in the state.

== Background ==
To qualify for the ballot in Florida, partisan candidates must first file with the Division of Elections of the Florida Department of State. After filing, a candidate must then qualify for the ballot by a deadline by either paying qualifying fees totaling 6% of the salary of the position sought, or obtaining sufficiently many signatures. Not all candidates who filed to run for governor subsequently qualified to appear on the ballot.

== Republican primary ==
=== Candidates ===
==== Nominee ====
- Ron DeSantis, incumbent governor (2019-present)

==== Failed to qualify ====
- John Joseph Mercadante, Republican National Committee official and candidate for governor in 2018
- Donald J. Peterson, marijuana activist

==== Declined ====
- Roger Stone, political consultant

=== Endorsements ===
Ron DeSantis

U.S. senators

- Rick Scott, U.S. senator from Florida (2019–present), former governor (2011-2019)

Organizations

- American Seniors Association
- Americans for Prosperity
- Associated Industries of Florida
- Club for Growth
- Florida Fraternal Order of Police
- Florida Police Benevolent Association
- Florida Police Chiefs Association
- Florida Professional Firefighters
- Florida Sheriffs Conference
- National Defense PAC
- Susan B. Anthony Pro-Life America

== Democratic primary ==
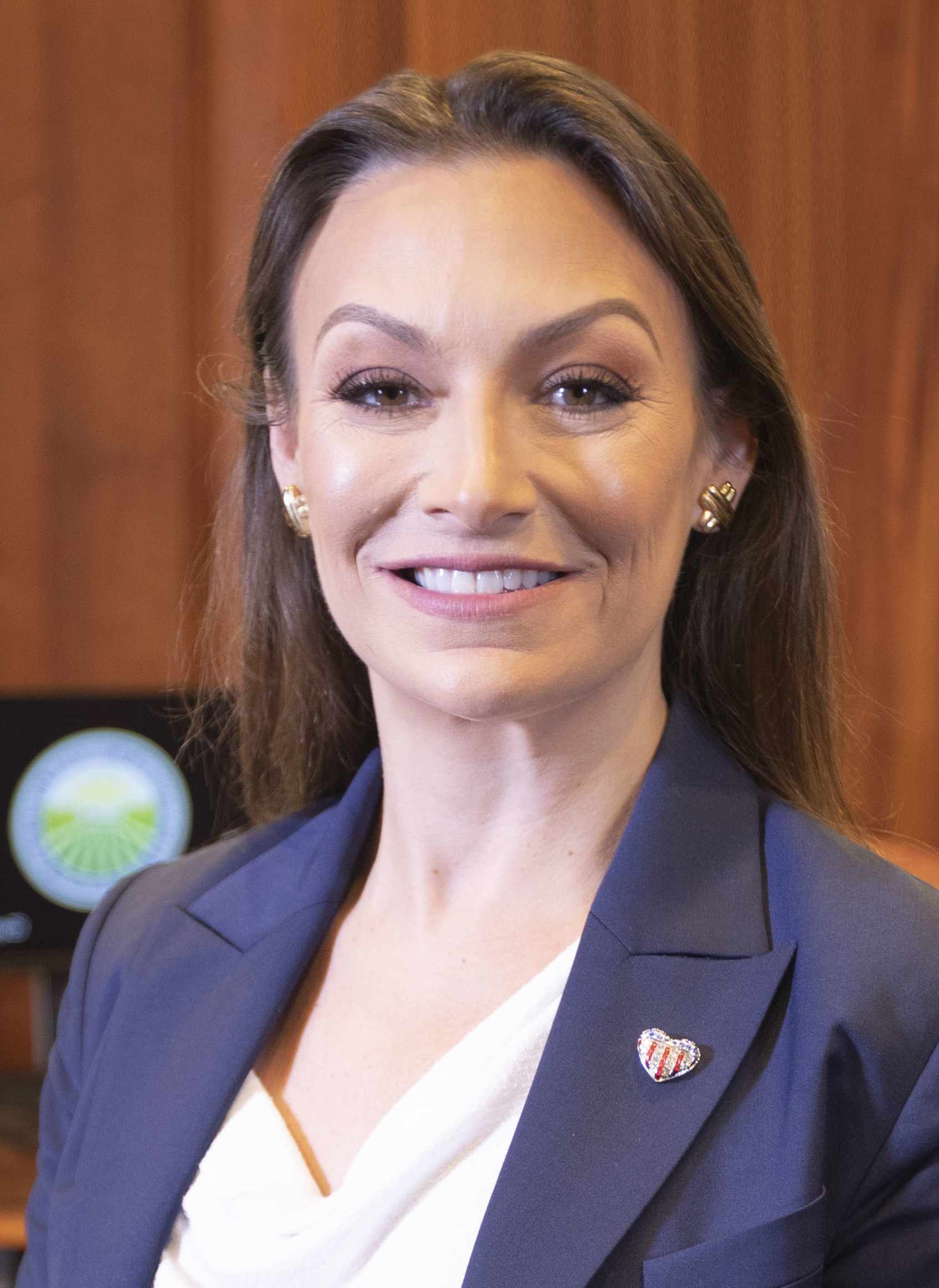
Florida Agriculture Commissioner Nikki Fried finished second in the primary.

=== Candidates ===
==== Nominee ====
- Charlie Crist, U.S. representative, former Republican governor of Florida and former attorney general of Florida

==== Eliminated in primary ====
- Cadance Daniel, consultant
- Nikki Fried, Florida commissioner of agriculture
- Robert Lee Willis, teacher and Baptist minister

==== Failed to qualify ====
- Robert Conner
- Ivan Graham, dentist
- Carlos Enrique Gutierrez, property manager and candidate for mayor of Miami Beach in 2021
- Jonathan Karns, businessman
- Alex Lundmark, real estate agent and candidate for governor in 2018
- Christine Powers
- Randy Zapata, legal advocate

==== Withdrawn ====
- Richard Dembinsky, engineer and candidate for state senate in 2016
- David Nelson Freeman, businessman
- Timothy Mosley, charity founder
- Annette Taddeo, state senator and nominee for lieutenant governor in 2014 (running for Florida's 27th congressional district) (endorsed Crist)

==== Declined ====
- Dave Aronberg, Palm Beach County state attorney and former state senator
- Lauren Book, state senator
- Randolph Bracy, state senator (running for Florida's 10th congressional district)
- Val Demings, U.S. representative (running for U.S. Senate)
- Anna Eskamani, state representative
- Dan Gelber, mayor of Miami Beach and former state house minority leader (endorsed Crist)
- Andrew Gillum, former mayor of Tallahassee and nominee for governor in 2018
- Rebekah Jones, former Florida Department of Health analyst (endorsed Fried)
- Al Lawson, U.S. representative (endorsed Crist)
- Stephanie Murphy, U.S. representative
- Jason Pizzo, state senator
- Sean Shaw, state representative and nominee for attorney general in 2018 (endorsed Crist)

=== Endorsements ===
Charlie Crist

U.S. representatives

- Kathy Castor, U.S. representative from Florida's 14th congressional district
- Jim Davis, former U.S. representative from Florida's 11th congressional district and Democratic nominee for governor of Florida in 2006
- Al Lawson, U.S. representative from Florida's 5th congressional district
- Nancy Pelosi, U.S. representative from California's 12th congressional district
- Debbie Wasserman Schultz, U.S. representative for Florida's 23rd congressional district

State officials

- Bob Butterworth, former Florida attorney general
- Alex Sink, former chief financial officer of Florida

State legislators

- Christopher Benjamin, state representative
- Lori Berman, state senator
- Kevin Chambliss, state representative
- Tracie Davis, state representative
- Ben Diamond, state representative
- Fentrice Driskell, state representative
- Nick Duran, state representative
- Anna Eskamani, state representative
- Terry Fields, former state representative
- Joe Geller, state representative
- Audrey Gibson, state senator and former state senate minority leader
- Michael Gottlieb, state representative
- Michael Grieco, state representative
- Dianne Hart, state representative
- Yvonne Hayes Hinson, state representative
- Tony Hill, former state senator
- Daryl Jones, former state senator
- Shevrin Jones, state senator
- Arthenia Joyner, former state senator and former state senate minority leader
- Janet Long, state representative
- Travaris McCurdy, state representative
- Jason Pizzo, state senator
- Tina Polsky, state senator
- Bobby Powell, state senator
- Felicia Robinson, state representative
- Sean Shaw, former state representative and nominee for Florida attorney general in 2018
- Carlos Guillermo Smith, state representative
- Annette Taddeo, state senator, withdrawn candidate in this election
- Perry Thurston, former state senator
- Susan Valdes, state representative
- Marie Woodson, state representative

Local officials

- Daniella Levine Cava, mayor of Miami-Dade County
- Dan Gelber, mayor of Miami Beach
- Steven Geller, mayor of Broward County
- Sally Heyman, Miami-Dade County commissioner
- Wayne Messam, mayor of Miramar and candidate for president in 2020
- Gwen Miller, former Tampa city councilor
- Les Miller, Hillsborough County commissioner, former state senate minority leader, and state house minority leader
- Lauren Poe, mayor of Gainesville
- Hazelle P. Rogers, mayor of Lauderdale Lakes
- Tim Ryan, Broward County commissioner
- Ken Welch, mayor of St. Petersburg

Organizations

- Sierra Club Florida

Labor unions

- 1199SEIU United Healthcare Workers East
- American Federation of Government Employees
- Communications Workers of America
- Florida AFL–CIO
- Florida Education Association
- Service Employees International Union Florida
- United Food and Commercial Workers Local 1625

Newspapers

- Miami Herald
- Orlando Sentinel
- The Palm Beach Post
- Sarasota Herald-Tribune
- Sun-Sentinel
- Tampa Bay Times

Individuals

- Mac Stipanovich, political strategist and lobbyist
Nikki Fried

State legislators

- Kristen Arrington, state representative
- Joseph Casello, state representative
- Margaret Good, former state representative
- Cindy Polo, former state representative
- Kelly Skidmore, state representative
- Jennifer Webb, former state representative

Individuals

- L. Felice Gorordo, CEO of eMerge Americas
- Fred Guttenberg, gun control activist
- Rebekah Jones, former GIS manager for the Florida Department of Health

Organizations

- Democratic Black Caucus of Florida
Annette Taddeo (withdrawn)

U.S. representatives

- Donna Shalala, former U.S. representative from Florida's 27th congressional district

State legislators

- Kevin Chambliss, state representative
- Cindy Lerner, former state representative
- Juan-Carlos Planas, former state representative (Republican)
- Ricardo Rangel, former state representative
- Vic Torres, state senator

Local officials

- Brian Corey, South Miami city commissioner
- Luis Gil, South Miami city commissioner
- Michael Góngora, former Miami Beach commissioner
- Paul Hernández, former Hialeah city councilman
- Daniella Levine Cava, mayor of Miami-Dade County
- Josh Liebman, South Miami city commissioner
- Joy Malakoff, former Miami Beach commissioner
- Amy Mercado, Orange County property appraiser
- Jean Monestime, Miami-Dade County commissioner
- Sally Phillips, mayor of South Miami
- David Richardson, Miami Beach city commissioner

Organizations

- Latino Victory Fund

Individuals

- Maria Cardona, political strategist

=== Polling ===
Graphical summary

Source of poll aggregation	Dates administered	Dates updated	Charlie Crist	Nikki Fried	Other (Note: Calculated by taking the difference of 100% and all other candidates combined.)	Margin
Real Clear Politics	February 7 – June 17, 2022	June 20, 2022	40.0%	23.3%	36.7%	Crist +16.7

Poll source	Date(s) administered	Sample size (Note: Key: A – all adults RV – registered voters LV – likely voters V – unclear)	Margin of error	Charlie Crist	Nikki Fried	Annette Taddeo	Other	Undecided
St. Pete Polls	August 20–21, 2022	1,617 (LV)	± 2.4%	59%	30%	–	–	11%
Change Research (D) (Note: Poll sponsored by Crist's campaign)	August 12–14, 2022	702 (LV)	± 4.2%	47%	37%	–	–	16%
University of North Florida	August 8–12, 2022	529 (LV)	± 6.0%	43%	47%	–	5% (Note: Daniel with 4%; Willis with 1%)	6%
Public Policy Polling (D) (Note: Poll sponsored by Fried's campaign)	August 8–9, 2022	664 (LV)	± 3.8%	42%	35%	–	–	23%
St. Pete Polls	August 2–3, 2022	1,361 (LV)	± 2.7%	56%	24%	–	–	20%
GBAO (D)	July 27–31, 2022	800 (LV)	± 3.5%	52%	36%	–	–	12%
Kaplan Strategies	July 6, 2022	671 (LV)	± 3.8%	39%	39%	–	–	22%
GBAO (D)	June 23–26, 2022	600 (LV)	± 4.0%	55%	34%	–	–	11%
St. Pete Polls	June 16–17, 2022	1,007 (LV)	± 3.1%	49%	24%	–	–	27%
Global Strategy Group (D)	June 8–13, 2022	600 (LV)	± 4.0%	38%	34%	–	–	29%
	June 6, 2022	Taddeo withdraws from the race						
St. Pete Polls	May 2–3, 2022	1,859 (LV)	± 2.3%	52%	19%	5%	–	24%
Sachs Media Group	April 8–10, 2022	700 (RV)	± 3.7%	35%	20%	4%	–	41%
University of North Florida	February 7–20, 2022	271 (RV)	± 6.0%	27%	19%	4%	8% (Note: Freeman with 4%; "Someone Else" with 3%; Lionheart with 1%)	44%
Mason-Dixon	February 7–10, 2022	400 (LV)	± 5.0%	44%	27%	3%	–	26%
Alvarado Strategies (R) (Note: Poll sponsored by Floridians For Economic Advancement)	February 2022	1,007 (LV)	± 3.1%	36%	25%	6%	10%	23%
GBAO (D)	January 26–31, 2022	800 (LV)	± 3.5%	54%	28%	7%	–	11%
GBAO (D)	January 26–31, 2022	800 (LV)	± 3.5%	56%	33%	–	–	11%
Public Policy Polling (D)	January 26–27, 2022	582 (LV)	± 4.1%	36%	34%	–	–	29%
Public Policy Polling (D)	August 10–11, 2021	274 (LV)	± 5.9%	33%	36%	–	–	31%
Susquehanna Polling & Research (R)	August 4–10, 2021	245 (RV)	± 6.3%	38%	27%	–	5%	30%
Political Matrix (R)	June 9–11, 2021	660 (LV)	± 4.5%	41%	31%	–	–	29%
St. Pete Polls	May 24–26, 2021	2,752 (RV)	± 1.9%	55%	22%	–	11%	12%
Victory Insights (R)	May 4, 2021	232 (RV)	± 7.0%	53%	30%	–	17% (Note: 17% for Val Demings)	–
SEA Polling (D) (Note: Poll sponsored by Taddeo's campaign committee)	April 15–20, 2021	600 (LV)	± 4.0%	28%	26%	13%	–	34%

=== Results ===
Results by county: Crist: 40–50%; 50–60%; 60–70%; 70–80%; Fried: 40–50%

Results by precinct: Crist: 30–40%; 40–50%; 50–60%; 60–70%; 70–80%; 80–90%; 90–100%; Fried: 30–40%; 40–50%; 50–60%; 60–70%; 70–80%; 80–90%; >90%; Daniel: 30–40%; >90%; Willis: 50–60%

Democratic primary results
Party	Candidate	Votes	%
Democratic	Charlie Crist	904,524	59.71%
Democratic	Nicole "Nikki" Fried	535,480	35.35%
Democratic	Cadance Daniel	38,198	2.52%
Democratic	Robert L. Willis	36,786	2.43%
Total votes		1,513,180	100.0%

=== Running mate selection ===
In June 2022, Politico released a shortlist of 18 people who Crist was considering as his running mate. On August 26, four days after Crist won the gubernatorial primary, CBS News reported that he had selected Karla Hernández-Mats, one of the people on the Politico shortlist.

==== Selected ====
- Karla Hernández-Mats, president of the United Teachers of Dade

==== On shortlist ====
- María Celeste Arrarás, journalist and former Telemundo news anchor
- Manny Diaz, chair of the Florida Democratic Party and former mayor of Miami
- Fentrice Driskell, state representative and minority leader-designate for the 2024–2026 legislative session
- Anna Eskamani, state representative
- Anne Gannon, Palm Beach County tax collector and former state representative
- Dan Gelber, mayor of Miami Beach, former state senator, and nominee for Florida attorney general in 2010
- Jennifer Jenkins, Brevard County school board member
- Shevrin Jones, state senator
- Al Lawson, U.S. representative for Florida's 5th congressional district
- Amy Mercado, Orange County Property Appraiser and former state representative
- Wayne Messam, mayor of Miramar and candidate for president in 2020
- Debbie Mucarsel-Powell, former U.S. representative for Florida's 26th congressional district
- Tina Polsky, state senator
- Bobby Powell, state senator
- Mary Ann Ruiz, attorney
- Sean Shaw, former state representative and nominee for Florida attorney general in 2018
- Marie Woodson, state representative

== Independent and third-party candidates ==
=== Green Party ===
==== Withdrawn ====
- Brian Moore, activist and perennial candidate (running for state senate)

=== Independent Party ===
==== Withdrawn ====
- Gizmo Wexler, IT administrator

=== Libertarian Party ===
==== Declared ====
- Hector Roos

==== Declined ====
- Roger Stone, political activist and consultant

=== Independent candidates ===
==== Declared ====
- Carmen Jackie Gimenez

==== Failed to qualify ====
- Eugene H. Steele, attorney

==== Withdrawn ====
- Mark B. Graham, computer technician and candidate for president in 2016
- Frank Hughes Jr., education consultant
- Jodi Gregory Jeloudov

==== Declined ====
- David Jolly, former U.S. representative

=== Write-ins ===
==== Declared ====
- Piotr Blass, perennial candidate
- James Thompson, pastor

== General election ==
=== Debate ===
2022 Florida gubernatorial debate
No.	Date	Host	Moderator	Link	Participants	
P Participant A Absent N Non-invitee I Invitee W Withdrawn						
P Participant A Absent N Non-invitee I Invitee W Withdrawn					Ron DeSantis	Charlie Crist
1	October 24, 2022	WPEC-TV	Liz Quirantes	YouTube	P	P

=== Predictions ===
Source	Ranking	As of
The Cook Political Report	Likely R	July 22, 2022
Inside Elections	Likely R	July 22, 2022
Sabato's Crystal Ball	Safe R	October 31, 2022
Politico	Likely R	April 1, 2022
RCP	Lean R	January 10, 2022
Fox News	Likely R	May 12, 2022
538	Solid R	October 18, 2022
Elections Daily	Safe R	November 7, 2022

=== Post-primary endorsements ===
Ron DeSantis (R)

Former U.S. executive branch officials

- Mike Pompeo, 70th United States secretary of state (2018–2021)
- Donald Trump, 45th president of the United States (2017–2021)

U.S. senators

- George LeMieux, former U.S. senator from Florida (2009–2011)
- Marco Rubio, U.S. senator from Florida (2011–2025)

U.S. representatives

- Kat Cammack, U.S. representative from Florida's 3rd congressional district (2021–present)
- Mario Díaz-Balart, U.S. representative from Florida's 25th congressional district (2003–present)

State officials

- Jeff Atwater, former chief financial officer of Florida (2011–2017)
- Charles Bronson, former Florida commissioner of agriculture (2001–2011)
- Dane Eagle, secretary of the Florida Department of Economic Opportunity (2020-2022)
- Stephanie Kopelousos, former secretary of the Florida Department of Transportation (2007–2011)
- Jeff Kottkamp, former lieutenant governor of Florida (2007–2011)
- Bill McCollum, former Florida attorney general (2007–2011)

State legislators

- Ken Pruitt, former state representative

Local officials

- Dave Kerner, member of the Palm Beach County Commission from the 3rd District (2016–present); former state representative from the 87th district (2012–2016) (Democrat)

Individuals

- Jason Gonzalez, former general counsel for Governor Crist
- Charlie Kirk, activist and founder of Turning Point USA
- Jorge Masvidal, professional mixed martial artist

Organizations

- Combat Veterans for Congress
- Everglades Trust
- Florida Farm Bureau
- NRA Political Victory Fund
Charlie Crist (D)

U.S. executive branch officials

- Joe Biden, 46th president of the United States (2021–2025)
- Barack Obama, 44th president of the United States (2009–2017)

U.S. representatives

- Darren Soto, U.S. representative for Florida's 9th congressional district (2017–present)

State officials

- Gavin Newsom, governor of California (2019–present)

Individuals

- Jill Biden, First Lady of the United States

Organizations

- Equality Florida
- Everytown for Gun Safety

Newspapers

- Orlando Weekly

=== Polling ===
Aggregate polls

Source of poll aggregation	Dates administered	Dates updated	Ron DeSantis (R)	Charlie Crist (D)	Other (Note: Calculated by taking the difference of 100% and all other candidates combined.)	Margin
Real Clear Politics	October 17 – November 6, 2022	November 8, 2022	54.4%	42.2%	3.4%	DeSantis +12.2
FiveThirtyEight	October 30, 2022 – November 7, 2022	November 8, 2022	54.5%	42.4%	3.0%	DeSantis +12.1
270 to win	November 4–7, 2022	November 8, 2022	54.0%	41.8%	4.2%	DeSantis +12.2
Average			54.3%	42.1%	3.6%	DeSantis +12.2

Poll source	Date(s) administered	Sample size	Margin of error	Ron DeSantis (R)	Charlie Crist (D)	Other	Undecided
The Political Matrix/The Listener Group (R)	November 6–7, 2022	722 (LV)	± 3.8%	52%	48%	–	–
Research Co.	November 4–6, 2022	450 (LV)	± 4.6%	54%	41%	2% (Note: "Some other candidate" with 2%)	3%
Data for Progress (D)	November 2–6, 2022	1,436 (LV)	± 3.0%	57%	42%	2% (Note: Gimenez (I) with 1%; Roos (L) with 1%)	–
Amber Integrated (R)	November 1–2, 2022	600 (LV)	± 4.0%	53%	40%	4% (Note: Roos (L) with 3%; "Other" with 1%)	4%
Civiqs	October 29 – November 2, 2022	772 (LV)	± 3.9%	54%	45%	1% (Note: "Someone else" with 1%)	1%
InsiderAdvantage (R) (Note: Poll sponsored by WOFL-TV)	November 1, 2022	550 (LV)	± 4.2%	53%	43%	1% (Note: "Another candidate" with 1%)	3%
Siena College	October 30 – November 1, 2022	659 (LV)	± 4.4%	54%	42%	–	3%
Victory Insights	October 30 – November 1, 2022	500 (LV)	± 4.8%	54%	41%	–	5%
Florida State University/YouGov	October 20–31, 2022	1,117 (RV)	–	53%	43%	–	–
The Political Matrix/The Listener Group (R)	October 27–28, 2022	633 (LV)	± 3.3%	47%	53%	–	–
University of North Florida	October 17–24, 2022	622 (LV)	± 4.7%	55%	41%	2% (Note: "Someone else" with 1%; "Refused" with 1%)	3%
Data for Progress (D)	October 19–23, 2022	1,251 (LV)	± 3.0%	54%	42%	1% (Note: Gimenez (I) with 1%; Roos (L) with <1%)	2%
Cherry Communications (R) (Note: Poll sponsored by the Florida Chamber of Commerce)	October 13–23, 2022	601 (LV)	± 4.0%	53%	42%	–	5%
Stetson University	October 16–20, 2022	644 (LV)	± 4.0%	53%	45%	–	2%
Florida Atlantic University	October 12–16, 2022	719 (LV)	± 3.7%	51%	40%	4% (Note: "Someone else" with 4%)	5%
YouGov (Note: Poll conducted for the Rose Institute of State and Local Government)	October 11–16, 2022	832 (LV)	± 3.0%	53%	43%	4%	–
Sachs Media	October 15, 2022	600 (LV)	–	52%	42%	–	6%
RMG Research (R) (Note: Poll conducted for Tripp Scott, a law firm associated with the Florida Republican Party)	October 10–13, 2022	685 (LV)	± 3.7%	52%	42%	–	6%
African American Research Collaborative (D) (Note: Poll conducted for Local Progress Impact Lab)	October 4–11, 2022	1,250 (RV)	± 2.8%	46%	41%	–	13%
Mason-Dixon Polling & Strategy	September 26–28, 2022	800 (LV)	± 3.5%	52%	41%	1%	6%
Clarity Campaign Labs (D) (Note: Poll sponsored by Progress Florida and Florida Watch)	September 22–27, 2022	2,860 (LV)	± 1.8%	47%	46%	–	7%
The Political Matrix/The Listener Group (R)	September 21, 2022	700 (LV)	± 3.3%	47%	53%	–	–
Siena College	September 18–25, 2022	669 (LV)	± 4.5%	49%	41%	2% (Note: "Another candidate" with 1%; "Not going to vote" with 1%)	7%
Civiqs	September 17–20, 2022	617 (LV)	± 4.5%	52%	45%	1% (Note: "Someone else" with 1%)	2%
Suffolk University	September 15–18, 2022	500 (LV)	± 4.4%	48%	41%	5% (Note: Roos (L) with 1%; Gimenez (I) with 3%; "Refused" with 1%)	7%
Sachs Media	September 10, 2022	600 (LV)	–	51%	45%	–	4%
Survey Monkey (D) (Note: Poll sponsored by Center Street PAC, which opposes DeSantis)	September 9–10, 2022	999 (RV)	± 3.0%	49%	43%	–	8%
Survey Monkey (D)	September 9–10, 2022	563 (LV)	± 3.0%	50%	47%	–	3%
Echelon Insights	August 31 – September 7, 2022	815 (LV)	± 4.3%	52%	42%	–	7%
InsiderAdvantage (R)	September 5–6, 2022	550 (LV)	± 4.2%	50%	45%	–	5%
Susquehanna Polling and Research (R)	August 29 – September 4, 2022	500 (LV)	± 4.3%	47%	43%	–	10%
Neighborhood Research and Media	August 29 – September 2, 2022	362 (LV)	± 4.3%	50%	41%	–	9%
Fabrizio Ward (R)/Impact Research (D)	August 24–31, 2022	500 (LV)	± 4.4%	50%	47%	–	3%
Clarity Campaign Labs (D)	August 25–30, 2022	3,017 (LV)	± 1.8%	48%	45%	–	7%
Impact Research (D) (Note: Poll sponsored by the Democratic Governors Association)	August 12–18, 2022	800 (LV)	± 3.5%	51%	46%	–	3%
Cherry Communications (R)	August 4–15, 2022	608 (LV)	± 4.0%	51%	43%	–	6%
University of North Florida	August 8–12, 2022	1,624 (RV)	± 3.4%	50%	42%	6%	2%
Clarity Campaign Labs (D)	July 26–31, 2022	2,244 (LV)	± 2.1%	47%	44%	–	9%
The Political Matrix/The Listener Group (R)	May 27 – June 4, 2022	714 (LV)	± 3.7%	49%	51%	–	–
Fabrizio Lee & Associates (R) (Note: Poll conducted for an undisclosed Republican client)	Mid-May 2022	1,200 (RV)	± 2.8%	47%	48%	–	5%
Phillips Academy	May 7–9, 2022	543 (RV)	± 4.2%	36%	35%	–	30%
Saint Leo University	February 28 – March 12, 2022	500 (LV)	± 4.5%	49%	33%	–	18%
The Political Matrix/The Listener Group (R)	February 23, 2022	1,064 (LV)	± 3.0%	44%	56%	–	–
University of North Florida	February 7–20, 2022	685 (RV)	± 3.7%	55%	34%	–	11%
Mason-Dixon	February 7–10, 2022	625 (RV)	± 4.0%	51%	43%	–	6%
Suffolk University	January 26–29, 2022	500 (LV)	± 4.4%	49%	43%	0%	8%
St. Pete Polls	November 18–19, 2021	2,896 (LV)	± 1.8%	51%	45%	–	5%
Redfield & Wilton Strategies	November 9, 2021	867 (RV)	± 3.3%	44%	37%	5%	9%
Redfield & Wilton Strategies	November 9, 2021	842 (LV)	± 3.4%	46%	40%	4%	7%
Saint Leo University	October 17–23, 2021	500 (A)	± 4.5%	47%	35%	–	18%
VCreek/AMG (R) (Note: Poll sponsored by Americas PAC)	September 23–27, 2021	405 (LV)	± 4.9%	47%	39%	2%	12%
The Political Matrix/The Listener Group (R)	September 11–12, 2021	1,144 (LV)	± 3.1%	45%	55%	–	–
The Political Matrix/The Listener Group (R)	September 3–5, 2021	1,144 (LV)	± 3.1%	45%	55%	–	–
RMG Research	August 21–28, 2021	1,000 (RV)	± 3.1%	45%	38%	–	17%
Redfield & Wilton Strategies	August 20–24, 2021	1,000 (RV)	± 3.1%	45%	36%	5%	9%
Redfield & Wilton Strategies	August 20–24, 2021	977 (LV)	± 3.1%	48%	38%	5%	8%
The Political Matrix/The Listener Group (R)	August 14–18, 2021	1,000 (LV)	± 3.1%	43%	57%	–	–
Change Research (D) (Note: Poll sponsored by Future Majority)	August 14–17, 2021	1,585 (LV)	± 2.5%	49%	45%	–	6%
Susquehanna Polling & Research (R)	August 4–10, 2021	700 (RV)	± 3.7%	46%	43%	3%	7%
Cherry Communications (R)	July 26 – August 4, 2021	610 (LV)	± 4.0%	51%	43%	–	6%
St. Pete Polls	August 2–3, 2021	3,952 (LV)	± 1.6%	44%	45%	–	11%
The Political Matrix/The Listener Group (R)	June 21, 2021	716 (LV)	± 3.7%	55%	45%	–	–
Cherry Communications (R)	April 30 – May 8, 2021	602 (LV)	± 4.0%	51%	41%	–	8%
Victory Insights (R)	May 4, 2021	600 (RV)	± 4.1%	53%	47%	–	–
Mason-Dixon	February 24–28, 2021	625 (RV)	± 4.0%	52%	41%	–	7%

Hypothetical polling

Ron DeSantis vs. Nikki Fried

Poll source	Date(s) administered	Sample size	Margin of error	Ron DeSantis (R)	Nikki Fried (D)	Other	Undecided
Cherry Communications (R)	August 4–15, 2022	608 (LV)	± 4.0%	50%	43%	–	7%
University of North Florida	August 8–12, 2022	1,624 (RV)	± 3.4%	50%	43%	5%	2%
Clarity Campaign Labs (D)	July 26–31, 2022	2,244 (LV)	± 2.1%	49%	43%	–	8%
Saint Leo University	February 28 – March 12, 2022	500 (LV)	± 4.5%	51%	27%	–	22%
The Political Matrix/The Listener Group (R)	February 23, 2022	1,064 (LV)	± 3.0%	50%	50%	–	–
University of North Florida	February 7–20, 2022	685 (RV)	± 3.7%	55%	32%	–	12%
Mason-Dixon	February 7–10, 2022	625 (RV)	± 4.0%	53%	42%	–	5%
Suffolk University	January 26–29, 2022	500 (LV)	± 4.4%	51%	40%	0%	9%
St. Pete Polls	November 18–19, 2021	2,896 (LV)	± 1.8%	51%	42%	–	6%
Redfield & Wilton Strategies	November 9, 2021	867 (RV)	± 3.3%	46%	35%	4%	8%
Redfield & Wilton Strategies	November 9, 2021	842 (LV)	± 3.4%	50%	37%	4%	7%
Saint Leo University	October 17–23, 2021	500 (A)	± 4.5%	46%	33%	–	21%
VCreek/AMG (R)	September 23–27, 2021	405 (LV)	± 4.9%	48%	36%	5%	11%
The Political Matrix/The Listener Group (R)	September 3–5, 2021	1,144 (LV)	± 3.1%	52%	48%	–	–
RMG Research	August 21–28, 2021	1,000 (RV)	± 3.1%	41%	38%	–	21%
Redfield & Wilton Strategies	August 20–24, 2021	1,000 (RV)	± 3.1%	45%	36%	4%	11%
Redfield & Wilton Strategies	August 20–24, 2021	977 (LV)	± 3.1%	48%	38%	3%	10%
The Political Matrix/The Listener Group (R)	August 14–18, 2021	1,000 (LV)	± 3.1%	46%	54%	–	–
Change Research (D)	August 14–17, 2021	1,585 (LV)	± 2.5%	49%	44%	–	7%
Susquehanna Polling & Research (R)	August 4–10, 2021	700 (RV)	± 3.7%	50%	40%	2%	7%
Cherry Communications (R)	July 26 – August 4, 2021	610 (LV)	± 4.0%	51%	42%	–	7%
St. Pete Polls	August 2–3, 2021	3,952 (LV)	± 1.6%	45%	42%	–	13%
The Political Matrix/The Listener Group (R)	June 21, 2021	716 (LV)	± 3.7%	61%	39%	–	–
Cherry Communications (R)	April 30 – May 8, 2021	602 (LV)	± 4.0%	51%	39%	–	10%
Victory Insights (R)	May 4, 2021	600 (RV)	± 4.1%	53%	47%	–	–
St. Pete Polls	March 22–24, 2021	1,923 (LV)	± 2.2%	45%	45%	–	10%
Mason-Dixon	February 24–28, 2021	625 (RV)	± 4.0%	51%	42%	–	7%

Ron DeSantis vs. Annette Taddeo

Poll source	Date(s) administered	Sample size	Margin of error	Ron DeSantis (R)	Annette Taddeo (D)	Undecided
Saint Leo University	February 28 – March 12, 2022	500 (LV)	± 4.5%	49%	30%	22%
Mason-Dixon	February 7–10, 2022	625 (RV)	± 4.0%	53%	37%	10%
Saint Leo University	October 17–23, 2021	500 (A)	± 4.5%	47%	28%	25%

Ron DeSantis vs. generic Democrat

Poll source	Date(s) administered	Sample size	Margin of error	Ron DeSantis (R)	Generic Democrat	Undecided
Clarity Campaign Labs (D)	July 26–31, 2022	2,244 (LV)	± 2.1%	48%	43%	9%
Data for Progress (D) (Note: Poll sponsored by the Defend Students Action Fund)	September 15–22, 2020	620 (LV)	± 3.9%	42%	44%	14%

Ron DeSantis vs. Val Demings

Poll source	Date(s) administered	Sample size	Margin of error	Ron DeSantis (R)	Val Demings (D)	Undecided
Cherry Communications (R)	April 30 – May 8, 2021	602 (LV)	± 4.0%	53%	38%	–
Victory Insights (R)	May 4, 2021	600 (RV)	± 4.1%	54%	46%	–

=== Results ===
State house district results

State Senate district results

2022 Florida gubernatorial election
Party	Candidate	Votes	%	±%
Republican	Ron DeSantis (incumbent) Jeanette Nuñez (incumbent)	4,614,210	59.37%	+9.78%
Democratic	Charlie Crist Karla Hernandez	3,106,313	39.97%	−9.22%
Independent	Carmen Jackie Gimenez Kyle "KC" Gibson	31,577	0.41%	N/A
Libertarian	Hector Roos Jerry "Tub" Rorabaugh	19,299	0.25%	N/A
Total votes		7,771,399	100.0%	N/A
Turnout		7,796,916	53.76%	
Registered electors		14,503,978		
Republican hold				

==== By county ====
By county

County	Ron DeSantis Republican		Charlie Crist Democratic		Other votes		Total votes
County	%	#	%	#	%	#	Total votes
Alachua	42.04%	40,321	57.14%	54,796	0.82%	784	95,901
Baker	89.45%	9,594	10.18%	1,092	0.37%	41	10,725
Bay	78.38%	52,590	21.00%	14,091	0.61%	412	67,093
Bradford	81.29%	8,346	18.04%	1,852	0.67%	69	10,267
Brevard	63.77%	170,562	35.57%	95,131	0.66%	1,760	267,453
Broward	41.97%	251,238	57.35%	343,286	0.68%	4,083	598,607
Calhoun	86.04%	4,180	13.52%	657	0.43%	21	4,858
Charlotte	70.52%	65,473	29.11%	27,031	0.37%	344	92,848
Citrus	74.23%	56,283	25.19%	19,100	0.58%	443	75,826
Clay	74.67%	67,292	24.62%	22,187	0.71%	640	90,119
Collier	71.74%	117,477	27.98%	45,815	0.29%	467	163,759
Columbia	79.19%	18,790	20.18%	4,789	0.62%	148	23,727
DeSoto	76.28%	6,637	23.25%	2,023	0.47%	41	8,701
Dixie	87.30%	5,394	11.90%	735	0.81%	50	6,179
Duval	55.44%	182,569	43.68%	143,837	0.88%	2,913	329,319
Escambia	64.46%	74,608	34.63%	40,076	0.91%	1,053	115,737
Flagler	66.76%	39,183	32.67%	19,177	0.57%	336	58,696
Franklin	73.56%	4,003	25.84%	1,406	0.61%	33	5,442
Gadsden	37.36%	6,511	62.01%	10,805	0.63%	110	17,426
Gilchrist	86.50%	6,806	12.93%	1,017	0.57%	45	7,868
Glades	80.73%	3,091	18.83%	721	0.44%	17	3,829
Gulf	80.16%	5,150	19.41%	1,247	0.44%	28	6,425
Hamilton	73.26%	3,145	26.09%	1,120	0.65%	28	4,293
Hardee	82.33%	4,558	17.14%	949	0.52%	29	5,536
Hendry	74.25%	6,134	24.84%	2,052	0.91%	75	8,261
Hernando	69.95%	56,228	29.47%	23,689	0.58%	468	80,385
Highlands	74.12%	29,518	25.09%	9,994	0.79%	313	39,825
Hillsborough	54.17%	261,936	44.95%	217,349	0.87%	4,229	483,514
Holmes	91.62%	6,214	7.86%	533	0.52%	35	6,782
Indian River	67.53%	52,269	31.97%	24,744	0.50%	387	77,400
Jackson	76.03%	12,412	23.49%	3,835	0.48%	79	16,326
Jefferson	60.47%	4,310	38.95%	2,776	0.58%	41	7,127
Lafayette	89.68%	2,617	10.08%	294	0.24%	7	2,918
Lake	66.54%	106,578	32.83%	52,579	0.63%	1,003	160,160
Lee	68.79%	189,335	30.79%	84,739	0.42%	1,165	275,239
Leon	41.82%	49,244	57.35%	67,535	0.83%	972	117,751
Levy	78.42%	14,049	20.98%	3,758	0.60%	107	17,914
Liberty	85.36%	2,345	14.18%	371	0.46%	12	2,617
Madison	66.77%	4,661	32.85%	2,293	0.39%	27	6,981
Manatee	64.70%	111,109	34.82%	59,801	0.48%	820	171,730
Marion	69.23%	108,027	30.20%	47,129	0.57%	894	156,050
Martin	69.01%	53,595	30.58%	23,748	0.42%	324	77,667
Miami-Dade	55.28%	393,532	43.97%	312,972	0.75%	5,347	711,851
Monroe	60.23%	20,479	39.15%	13,314	0.62%	211	34,004
Nassau	76.52%	36,551	22.97%	10,973	0.50%	240	47,764
Okaloosa	76.18%	61,715	22.92%	18,569	0.89%	724	81,008
Okeechobee	80.34%	8,746	19.10%	2,079	0.56%	61	10,886
Orange	46.08%	187,653	53.10%	216,221	0.82%	3,356	407,230
Osceola	52.84%	54,330	46.09%	47,387	1.08%	1,108	102,825
Palm Beach	51.21%	278,454	48.30%	262,655	0.49%	2,679	543,788
Pasco	65.82%	148,083	33.49%	75,342	0.69%	1,555	224,980
Pinellas	54.61%	231,284	44.76%	189,563	0.63%	2,647	423,494
Polk	64.45%	148,254	34.85%	80,172	0.69%	1,591	230,017
Putnam	76.02%	20,217	23.30%	6,196	0.68%	180	26,593
Santa Rosa	79.38%	60,091	19.94%	15,096	0.68%	511	75,698
Sarasota	60.92%	133,354	38.65%	84,614	0.42%	929	218,897
Seminole	55.78%	102,191	43.48%	79,664	0.73%	1,346	183,201
St. Johns	69.87%	101,066	29.64%	42,873	0.49%	715	144,654
St. Lucie	59.31%	72,354	40.17%	49,009	0.52%	630	121,993
Sumter	73.21%	65,496	26.51%	23,718	0.28%	250	89,464
Suwannee	83.39%	13,649	16.19%	2,650	0.42%	68	16,367
Taylor	82.76%	6,308	16.74%	1,276	0.50%	38	7,622
Union	87.65%	3,995	11.94%	544	0.42%	19	4,558
Volusia	63.99%	144,768	35.34%	79,965	0.67%	1,513	226,246
Wakulla	73.25%	11,033	26.02%	3,920	0.73%	110	15,063
Walton	82.08%	28,647	17.51%	6,112	0.41%	142	34,901
Washington	85.32%	7,786	14.08%	1,285	0.60%	55	9,126

Counties that flipped from Democratic to Republican

- Duval (largest municipality: Jacksonville)
- Hillsborough (largest municipality: Tampa)
- Miami-Dade (largest city: Miami)
- Osceola (largest municipality: Kissimmee)
- Palm Beach (largest city: West Palm Beach)
- Pinellas (largest municipality: St. Petersburg)
- Seminole (largest municipality: Sanford)
- St. Lucie (largest city: Port St. Lucie)

==== By congressional district ====
DeSantis won 22 of 28 congressional districts, including two that elected Democrats.

District	DeSantis	Crist	Representative
1st	73%	26%	Matt Gaetz
2nd	62%	38%	Neal Dunn
3rd	64%	35%	Kat Cammack
4th	60%	39%	Aaron Bean
5th	65%	34%	John Rutherford
6th	68%	31%	Mike Waltz
7th	60%	39%	Stephanie Murphy (117th Congress)
7th	60%	39%	Cory Mills (118th Congress)
8th	65%	35%	Bill Posey
9th	50%	49%	Darren Soto
10th	41%	58%	Val Demings (117th Congress)
10th	41%	58%	Maxwell Frost (118th Congress)
11th	63%	37%	Daniel Webster
12th	69%	30%	Gus Bilirakis
13th	58%	41%	Anna Paulina Luna
14th	47%	52%	Kathy Castor
15th	59%	40%	Laurel Lee
16th	61%	38%	Vern Buchanan
17th	64%	35%	Greg Steube
18th	69%	30%	Scott Franklin
19th	69%	30%	Byron Donalds
20th	30%	69%	Sheila Cherfilus-McCormick
21st	62%	37%	Brian Mast
22nd	48%	51%	Lois Frankel
23rd	50%	49%	Jared Moskowitz
24th	31%	68%	Frederica Wilson
25th	47%	52%	Debbie Wasserman Schultz
26th	70%	29%	Mario Díaz-Balart
27th	58%	41%	María Elvira Salazar
28th	64%	36%	Carlos A. Giménez

== Analysis ==
According to exit polls, DeSantis won 65% of White voters, 13% of Black voters, and 58% of Latinos; of the latter group, DeSantis won 69% of Cubans and 56% of Puerto Ricans. DeSantis' large margin of victory was in part due to him flipping Democratic stronghold Miami-Dade County for the first time since 2002, and Palm Beach County for the first time since 1986, as well as winning Hillsborough, Osceola, Pinellas, and St. Lucie counties for the first time since 2006; this was also the first gubernatorial election since 2006 in which a candidate received over 50% of the vote. His near 20% margin of victory was the largest since 1982 and the largest for a Republican in state history. It was also the first time the governorship was won by double digits since 2002, and the first time it was won by over one million votes.

Significantly, Crist's 40% performance was the worst for a Democratic nominee for governor of Florida since 1916. Republicans won the other statewide races by double digits; this is the first time since the end of Reconstruction that Democrats do not hold at least one of the statewide positions. DeSantis also made large gains among Hispanic voters, becoming the first Republican in decades to win a majority of those voters. He also had a major fundraising advantage over Crist, setting an all-time record for a gubernatorial candidate.

=== Voter demographics ===
Edison Research exit poll
Demographic subgroup	Crist	DeSantis	% of voters
Gender
Men	35	64	49
Women	46	53	51
Age
18–24 years old	54	44	7
25–29 years old	56	41	4
30–39 years old	52	47	13
40–49 years old	38	60	12
50–64 years old	36	63	32
65 and older	36	64	32
Race
White	34	65	64
Black	86	13	11
Latino	40	58	21
Race by gender
White men	27	72	32
White women	40	58	32
Black men	81	19	5
Black women	91	9	6
Latino men	41	57	10
Latina women	39	60	11
Education
High school or less	33	67	15
Some college education	41	58	25
Associate degree	40	59	19
Bachelor's degree	43	56	24
Advanced degree	44	55	17
Party ID
Democrats	95	5	28
Republicans	2	97	42
Independents	45	53	30
Ideology
Liberals	90	10	20
Moderates	53	45	39
Conservatives	6	94	42
Marital status
Married	38	62	59
Unmarried	50	50	41
Gender by marital status
Married men	32	68	30
Married women	44	55	29
Unmarried men	49	51	18
Unmarried women	50	49	23
First-time midterm election voter
Yes	41	59	11
No	43	57	89
Most important issue facing the country
Crime	35	63	10
Inflation	26	74	39
Gun policy	62	36	10
Immigration	12	88	10
Abortion	80	19	24
Area type
Urban	43	56	46
Suburban	40	58	44
Rural	30	70	10
Source: CNN

== See also ==
- Elections in Florida
- Political party strength in Florida
- Florida Democratic Party
- Florida Republican Party
- Government of Florida
- 2022 United States Senate election in Florida
- 2022 United States House of Representatives elections in Florida
- 2022 Florida House of Representatives election
- 2022 Florida Senate election
- 2022 Florida elections
- 2022 United States gubernatorial elections
- 2022 United States elections

== Notes ==
Partisan clients
