= Dwight Dudley =

American politician

Dwight Richard Dudley
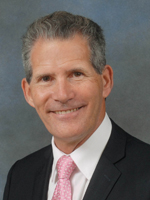

Member of the Florida House of Representatives from the 68th district
- In office November 20, 2012 – November 8, 2016
- Preceded by: Jim Boyd
- Succeeded by: Ben Diamond

Personal details
- Born: Dwight Richard Dudley; May 30, 1954 (age 72) Boston, Massachusetts
- Party: Democratic
- Spouse: Mary Rachel Quinn (m. 1992, div. 2018)
- Education: St. Petersburg College (A.A.); Florida State University (B.S.); Florida State University College of Law (J.D.)
- Profession: Attorney

Dwight Richard Dudley (born May 30, 1954) was a Democratic member of the Florida House of Representatives, representing the 68th District, which includes southern Pinellas County, from 2012 to 2016.

== History ==
Dudley was born in Boston, Massachusetts, and moved to the state of Florida in 1959. He attended St. Petersburg College, where he graduated with an Associate's degree in 1978, and later Florida State University, where he graduated with a degree in speech communication in 1980. Afterwards, he attended the Florida State University College of Law, graduating in 1987. After graduation, he worked as a legislative aide and analyst in the Florida House of Representatives before moving back to St. Petersburg, where he served as an assistant public defender. For two years Dudley worked with Baker Act patients. Dudley eventually started his own law firm in Saint Petersburg in 1996 where he continues to practice to this day. Dudley has defended clients in over 100 jury trials. His recreational interests include biking, fishing, marathon running, and boating, and nature exploration.

== Florida House of Representatives ==
In 2012, following the reconfiguration of Florida House districts, Dudley opted to run in the newly created 68th District. He won the Democratic nomination unopposed, and in the general election, he faced former State Representative Frank Farkas, the Republican nominee, and independent candidate Matthew Weidner. A contentious election ensued, with Dudley attacking Farkas for his association with gambling lobbyists, and Farkas attacking Dudley over his history as a criminal defense attorney. The Tampa Bay Times endorsed Dudley, declaring that he "would bring a fresh voicer to Tallahassee and better represent consumers." In the end, Dudley narrowly emerged victorious, winning 51% of the vote to Farkas's 44% and Weidner's 5%.

While serving in the legislature, Dudley authored legislation that would repeal the ability of utility companies "to charge customers for future power plants," which has allowed Duke Energy to charge its customers more than a billion dollars for a nuclear plant that they decided to cancel, and legislation that would allow "renewable and alternative energy providers to exist alongside large utility companies." However, during the legislative session, his legislation was not considered, so he called for constitutional amendments to be placed on the ballot that would repeal the customer fee and encourage renewable energy production.

Dudley was mentioned as a potential candidate to run against Republican United States Congressman David Jolly in the 13th congressional district, but he ultimately declined to run, instead choosing to seek re-election. In his campaign for re-election, Dudley will either face Joshua Black or Bill Young II, the son of the late former Congressman Bill Young, who are running in the Republican primary. Black drew national attention in January 2014 when he publicly called for the hanging of President Barack Obama, posting on Twitter, "I'm past impeachment. It's time to arrest and hang him high." Dudley condemned Black's comments, declaring, "It's dangerous and unbecoming for someone who wants to lead to call for such violence and extremist action. Wow. I'm stunned."

== Affiliations ==
Representative Dudley has been affiliated with the following organizations:

- Pinellas Association of Criminal Defense Lawyers, President, 2003, current member
- St. Paul's Catholic Church
- The Dali Museum
- The Palladium Theater
- Tiger Bay
- YMCA
- Knights of Columbus, past member
