= George Cretekos =

American politician

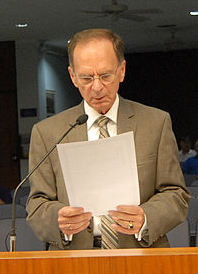

Mayor of Clearwater
- In office February 13, 2012 – March 30, 2020
- Preceded by: Frank Hibbard
- Succeeded by: Frank Hibbard

Personal details
- Born: January 26, 1947 (age 78); Tampa, Florida, U.S.
- Political party: Republican
- Spouse: Carolyn
- Education: Davidson College (BA); University of Pittsburgh (MPA)

George N. Cretekos (born January 26, 1947) is an American politician from the state of Florida. A member of the Republican Party, Cretekos is the former mayor of Clearwater, Florida. Prior to his election as mayor, he served as a congressional aide to Bill Young for 36 years, and served on the Clearwater City Council.

== Biography ==
Cretekos is from Tarpon Springs, Florida. He graduated from Tarpon Springs High School and Davidson College, where he received a bachelor's degree in political science. While at Davidson, Cretekos interned for a member of the United States House of Representatives, and attended the 1968 Republican National Convention. After graduating from Davidson, he earned his master's degree in public administration from the University of Pittsburgh's Graduate School of Public and International Affairs.

After graduating with his master's degree, Cretekos accepted a job as a legislative aide for Bill Young, who had been elected to the United States House of Representatives, starting in 1971. He served in the role for 36 years. Cretekos was elected to the City Council of Clearwater, Florida in 2007, filling the remainder of Hoyt Hamilton's term. He was elected without opposition. He was re-elected in 2008, and was sworn in as Vice Mayor in 2008. He was elected mayor of Clearwater in 2012.

Cretekos was considered a potential candidate in the 2014 special election to replace Young, representing Florida's 13th congressional district. He declined to run, saying he is "a local kind of guy".

== Personal ==
Cretekos is Greek Orthodox, and thought about becoming a priest when he was young. After leaving Young's office, he spent a month in Indonesia as a missionary.

Cretekos and his wife, Carolyn, live in the Sand Key section of Clearwater. His father, Nick, worked as a mail carrier and auctioneer. He has three siblings. His grandfather was a sponge merchant. His grandfather's sponge diving boat, the George N. Cretekos is on the United States' National Register of Historic Places. The Cretekos family are related to Maria Callas.

Political offices
Preceded by Frank Hibbard	Mayor of Clearwater, Florida; 2012 – 2020	Succeeded by Frank Hibbard
