= 2014 Florida's 13th congressional district special election =

- March 11, 2014

Florida's 13th congressional district
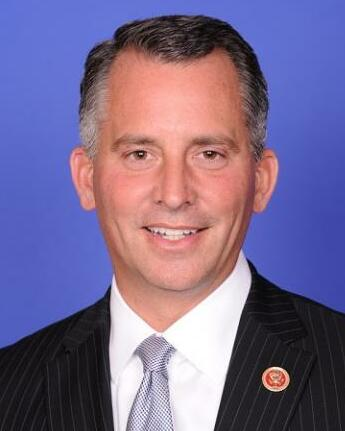

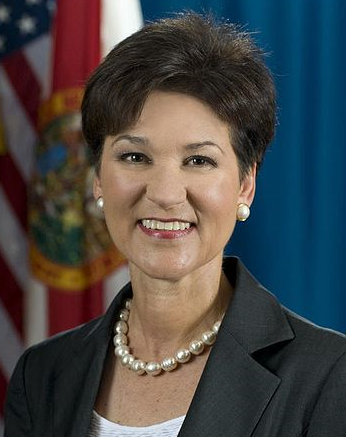
Nominee	David Jolly	Alex Sink
Party	Republican	Democratic
Popular vote	89,167	85,673
Percentage	48.52%	46.62%
U.S. Representative before election
Bill Young
Republican
Elected U.S. Representative
David Jolly
Republican

A special election for Florida's 13th congressional district was held March 11, 2014, to elect a member of the United States House of Representatives, following the death of incumbent Republican Congressman Bill Young on October 18, 2013. Primary elections were held on January 14, 2014. Young, who had already announced that he would not be running for re-election in 2014, had been re-elected in 2012 with 57 percent of the vote. With 100% of the precincts reporting, David Jolly was declared the winner.

== Background ==
On October 9, 2013, Republican Bill Young, who had held this Tampa Bay-area district since 1971, announced that he would not run for re-election to a twenty-second term in 2014. He died nine days later and this special election was called to fill his seat. Though Young had been re-elected by wide margins, the district in recent years had become competitive. In the four most recent presidential elections, it was won by Al Gore over George W. Bush in 2000 51%-49%, by Bush with 51%-49% in 2004, by Barack Obama over John McCain 51%-47% and again carried by Obama in 2012 by a narrower 50%-49% over Mitt Romney. Given this, some political commentators and journalists viewed this election as a bellwether for the fall 2014 elections. While discounting the idea of special elections as bellwethers, political scientists agreed the result was a data point that public sentiment favored Republicans.

== Republican primary ==
=== Candidates ===
==== Declared ====
- Mark Bircher, retired United States Marine Corps brigadier general
- David Jolly, attorney and former general counsel to Bill Young
- Kathleen Peters, state representative

==== Declined ====
- Larry Ahern, state representative
- Joseph Ayoub, mayor of Safety Harbor
- Rick Baker, former mayor of St. Petersburg
- Neil Brickfield, former Pinellas County commissioner
- George Cretekos, mayor of Clearwater
- Larry Crow, former state representative
- Bob Gualtieri, Pinellas County sheriff
- Frank Hibbard, former mayor of Clearwater
- Michael Pinson, publisher
- Karen Seel, Pinellas County commissioner
- Beverly Young, widow of Bill Young
- Bill "Billy" Young II, son of Bill Young
- Tom Young, brother of Bill Young

=== Endorsements ===
Mark Bircher

Politicians

- Allen West, former U.S. representative
David Jolly

Politicians

- Larry Ahern, state representative
- Rick Baker, former Mayor of St. Petersburg
- Nancy Bostock, Pinellas County School Board member and former Pinellas County commissioner
- Jeff Brandes, state senator
- Douglas Burnett, former Florida adjutant general
- Dan Calabria, mayor of South Pasadena
- Pam Dubov, Pinellas County Property Appraiser
- Jim Lawrence, mayor of Indian Shores
- Bill Mischler, former mayor of Pinellas Park
- Rich Nugent, U.S. representative
- Jerry Rehm, mayor of Dunedin and former state senator
- Leslie Waters, mayor of Seminole

Individuals

- Bob Barker, former game show host, animal rights activist
- Bill Edwards, businessman
- Gordon R. England, former United States Secretary of the Navy
- Jim Holton, businessman
- Bill Hough, businessman
- Jim MacDougald, businessman
- Mel Sembler, former United States Ambassador to Italy
- Beverly Young, widow of Bill Young

Organizations

- Clearwater Fraternal Order of Police
- Florida Gulf Coast Chapter of Associated Builders and Contractors

Newspapers

- Tampa Tribune
Kathleen Peters

Politicians

- Joe Ayoub, mayor of Safety Harbor
- Neil Brickfield, former Pinellas County commissioner
- Ken Burke, clerk of court
- Rick Butler, Pinellas Park City Council member
- Jim Coats, former sheriff of Pinellas County
- George Cretekos, mayor of Clearwater
- Max Elson, South Pasadena City commissioner
- Frank Farkas, former state representative
- Bill Foster, former mayor of St. Petersburg
- Bob Gualtieri, sheriff of Pinellas County
- Hoyt Hamilton, former Clearwater City Council member
- Doreen Hock-DiPolito, Clearwater City Council member
- Ed Hooper, state representative
- Patti Johnson, Pinellas Park City Council member
- Bill Jonson, Clearwater City Council member
- Jack Latvala, state senator
- Bob Minning, mayor of Treasure Island
- Gail Neidinger, South Pasadena City commissioner
- Diane Nelson, Pinellas County tax collector
- Peggy O'Shea, Pinellas County School Board member
- Travis Palladeno, mayor of Madeira Beach
- Arthur Penny, South Pasadena City commissioner
- Jay Polglaze, Clearwater City Council member
- Suzy Sofer, Bellaire Bluffs commissioner
- Ann Wagner, U.S. representative from Missouri

Individuals

- Bill Young II, son of Bill Young

Organizations

- Maggie's List

Newspapers

- Tampa Bay Times

=== Polling ===
Poll source	Date(s) administered	Sample size	Margin of error	Mark Bircher	David Jolly	Kathleen Peters	Undecided
St. Pete Polls	January 9, 2014	653	± 3.8%	26.3%	36.5%	23.9%	13.3%
Gravis Marketing	January 8, 2014	976	± 3%	25%	34%	28%	14%
St. Pete Polls	December 30, 2013	488	± 4.4%	17.7%	39.4%	27.7%	15.1%
St. Pete Polls	December 18, 2013	660	± 3.8%	16.1%	34.9%	30.2%	18.9%
St. Pete Polls	December 3, 2013	534	± 4.2%	17.2%	27.8%	27.1%	28.0%

Poll source	Date(s) administered	Sample size	Margin of error	Rick Baker	Neil Brickfield	Larry Crow	Frank Hibbard	David Jolly	Kathleen Peters	Karen Seel	Other	Undecided
St. Pete Polls	November 18, 2013	582	± 4.1%	—	—	—	—	39.2%	17.3%	—	30.9%	12.6%
St. Pete Polls	November 5, 2013	498	± 4.4%	—	16.8%	—	15%	18.7%	—	—	28.7%	20.8%
St. Pete Polls	October 15, 2013	742	± 3.6%	51%	7%	4%	—	2%	—	10%	27%	—

=== Results ===
Republican primary results
Party	Candidate	Votes	%
Republican	David Jolly	20,504	44.58%
Republican	Kathleen Peters	14,238	30.96%
Republican	Mark Bircher	11,247	24.46%
Total votes		45,989	100.00%

== Democratic nomination ==
=== Candidates ===
==== Nominee ====
- Alex Sink, former chief financial officer of Florida and nominee for governor of Florida in 2010

==== Withdrew ====
- Jessica Ehrlich, attorney and nominee for the 13th congressional district in 2012

==== Declined ====
- Charlie Justice, Pinellas County commissioner and nominee for Florida's 10th congressional district in 2010
- Janet Long, Pinellas County commissioner

=== Endorsements ===
Alex Sink

Politicians

- Joseph Barkley, Belleair Bluffs city council member
- Nancy Besore, Safety Harbor commissioner
- Kathy Castor, U.S. representative
- Dwight Dudley, state representative
- Rene Flowers, Pinellas County School Board member
- Amy Foster, St. Petersburg City Council member
- Michael Fridovich, Gulfport City Council member
- Patricia Gerard, mayor of Largo
- Samuel Henderson, mayor of Gulfport
- Lorraine Huhn, vice mayor of St. Pete Beach
- Robert Jackson, former mayor of Largo
- Charlie Justice, Pinellas County commissioner
- Steve Kornell, St. Petersburg City Council member
- Linda Lerner, Pinellas County School Board member
- Janet Long, Pinellas County commissioner
- Jack Nazario, Belleair Bluffs commissioner
- Karl Nurse, St. Petersburg City Council member
- Carlen Petersen, former Clearwater City Council member
- Patricia Plantamura, Seminole City Council member
- Jim Quinn, Seminole City Council member
- Darryl Rouson, state representative
- Mike Smith, Largo City Council member
- Ken Welch, Pinellas County commissioner
- Carl Zimmermann, state representative

Organisations

- EMILY's List

=== Polling ===
Hypothetical polling

Poll source	Date(s) administered	Sample size	Margin of error	Jessica Ehrlich	Alex Sink	Other	Undecided
St. Pete Polls	November 5, 2013	367	± 5.1%	10.6%	69.6%	10.7%	9.1%
St. Pete Polls	October 15, 2013	706	± 3.7%	20%	63%	10%	7%

== General election ==
=== Candidates ===
- David Jolly (Republican), attorney and former general counsel to Bill Young
- Michael S. Levinson (write-in)
- Lucas Overby (Libertarian), commercial diver and activist
- Alex Sink (Democratic), former Chief Financial Officer of Florida and nominee for governor of Florida in 2010

One voter was confused by a website called "sinkforcongress2014" accepting donations to the National Republican Congressional Committee to defeat Sink and other Democrats, thinking it was a pro-Sink website. His $250 donation was refunded by the NRCC.

=== Debates ===
David Jolly, Lucas Overby, and Alex Sink, the three candidates appearing on the ballot for the special election, took part in a televised debate on February 3, 2014. Held at the Seminole Campus of St. Petersburg College and co-hosted by the Tampa Bay Times and Bay News 9, the event aired live on C-SPAN 3. Al Ruechel, Adam Smith, and Amy Hollyfield served as moderators. The debate can be viewed in its entirety here.

A non-scientific poll conducted after the debate by Bay News 9 indicated that overall viewers felt David Jolly had won with 37% of the vote, followed by Alex Sink with 33% and Lucas Overby with 30%.

=== Campaign spending ===
During the campaign, OpenSecrets reported on February 13, 2014, that outside groups had spent $3.5 million on the election, with $2.6 million of that from groups that support Jolly. This makes it the most expensive election of the 2014 cycle so far and one of the most expensive special congressional elections in history.

The Associated Press reported that $11 million total was spent as the Democratic Party poured money into the campaign in its final weeks. In the end, Sink outspent Jolly by three to one on television ads, as well as outspending him overall.

=== Endorsements ===
David Jolly

Politicians

- Larry Ahern, state representative
- Rick Baker, former mayor of St. Petersburg
- Mark Bircher, candidate for the 13th Congressional district
- Pam Bondi, attorney general of Florida
- Nancy Bostock, Pinellas County School Board member and former Pinellas County commissioner
- Jeff Brandes, state senator
- Neil Brickfield, former Pinellas County commissioner
- Douglas Burnett, former Florida adjutant general
- Jeb Bush, former governor of Florida
- Dan Calabria, mayor of South Pasadena
- Pam Dubov, Pinellas County property appraiser
- Jim Lawrence, Mayor of Indian Shores
- John McCain, U.S. senator from Arizona and 2008 Republican presidential nominee
- Bill Mischler, former mayor of Pinellas Park
- Rich Nugent, U.S. representative
- Rand Paul, U.S. senator from Kentucky
- Kathleen Peters, state representative and candidate for the 13th Congressional district
- Jerry Rehm, mayor of Dunedin and former state senator
- Marco Rubio, U.S. senator from Florida
- Rick Scott, governor of Florida
- Leslie Waters, mayor of Seminole

Individuals

- Bob Barker, former game show host, animal rights activist
- Bill Edwards, businessman
- Gordon R. England, former United States Secretary of the Navy
- Jim Holton, businessman
- Bill Hough, businessman
- Jim MacDougald, businessman
- Mel Sembler, former United States Ambassador to Italy
- Beverly Young, widow of Bill Young
- Bill Young II, son of Bill Young

Organizations

- Clearwater Fraternal Order of Police
- Florida Gulf Coast Chapter of Associated Builders and Contractors

Newspapers

- Tampa Tribune
Lucas Overby

Politicians

- Gary Johnson, former Republican governor of New Mexico and Libertarian nominee for president in 2012
Alex Sink

Politicians

- Joseph Barkley, Belleair Bluffs city council member
- Nancy Besore, Safety Harbor commissioner
- Kathy Castor, U.S. representative
- Dwight Dudley, state representative
- Rene Flowers, Pinellas County School Board member
- Amy Foster, St. Petersburg City Council member
- Michael Fridovich, Gulfport City Council member
- Patricia Gerard, mayor of Largo
- Samuel Henderson, mayor of Gulfport
- Lorraine Huhn, vice mayor of St. Pete Beach
- Robert Jackson, former mayor of Largo
- Charlie Justice, Pinellas County commissioner
- Steve Kornell, St. Petersburg City Council member
- Susan Latvala, Republican Pinellas County commissioner
- Linda Lerner, Pinellas County School Board member
- Janet Long, Pinellas County commissioner
- Jack Nazario, Belleair Bluffs commissioner
- Karl Nurse, St. Petersburg City Council member
- Carlen Petersen, former Clearwater City Council member
- Patricia Plantamura, Seminole City Council member
- Jim Quinn, Seminole City Council member
- Darden Rice, St. Petersburg City Council member
- Darryl Rouson, state representative
- Mike Smith, Largo City Council member
- Ken Welch, Pinellas County commissioner
- Carl Zimmermann, state representative

Organisations

- EMILY's List

Newspapers

- Tampa Bay Times

=== Polling ===
Poll source	Date(s) administered	Sample size	Margin of error	David Jolly (R)	Alex Sink (D)	Lucas Overby (L)	Undecided
Public Policy Polling	March 7–9, 2014	702	± 3.7%	45%	48%	6%	2%
RedRacingHorses & PMI inc.	February 25–27, 2014	391	± 6%	46%	44%	5%	5%
St. Pete Polls	February 25, 2014	1,269	± 2.8%	45.6%	45.9%	6.4%	2.1%
Fabrizio, Lee & Associates	February 17–18, 2014	400	± 4.9%	44%	42%	—	14%
St. Pete Polls	February 12, 2014	1,130	± 2.9%	46.2%	44%	6.6%	2.4%
St. Leo University	February 9–11, 2014	400	± 5%	37%	46%	12%	5%
Braun Research	February 4–9, 2014	603	± 4%	35%	42%	4%	14%
DCCC	January 24, 2014	527	± 4.3%	45%	49%	—	6%
McLaughlin & Associates	January 16–19, 2014	400	± 4.9%	43%	38%	4%	15%
St. Pete Polls	January 15, 2014	1,278	± 2.7%	47%	42.8%	4.4%	5.9%
St. Pete Polls	December 3, 2013	1,128	± 2.9%	36.3%	49%	5.6%	8.8%
St. Pete Polls	November 18, 2013	1,252	± 2.8%	34.9%	49.3%	—	15.7%
St. Pete Polls	November 5, 2013	1,079	± 3%	31%	51.5%	—	17.5%

Hypothetical polling

Poll source	Date(s) administered	Sample size	Margin of error	Rick Baker (R)	Jessica Ehrlich (D)	Undecided
St. Pete Polls	October 15, 2013	1,741	± 2.3%	34.6%	30.7%	34.7%

Poll source	Date(s) administered	Sample size	Margin of error	Rick Baker (R)	Alex Sink (D)	Undecided
St. Pete Polls	October 15, 2013	1,741	± 2.3%	34.0%	50.8%	15.2%

Poll source	Date(s) administered	Sample size	Margin of error	Mark Bircher (R)	Alex Sink (D)	Undecided
St. Pete Polls	December 3, 2013	1,128	± 2.9%	30.2%	50.4%	12.1%

Poll source	Date(s) administered	Sample size	Margin of error	Neil Brickfield (R)	Alex Sink (D)	Undecided
St. Pete Polls	November 5, 2013	1,079	± 3%	30.1%	51.2%	18.8%
St. Pete Polls	October 15, 2013	1,741	± 2.3%	24.0%	56.6%	19.4%

Poll source	Date(s) administered	Sample size	Margin of error	Frank Hibbard (R)	Alex Sink (D)	Undecided
St. Pete Polls	November 5, 2013	1,079	± 3%	30.7%	51.6%	17.7%

Poll source	Date(s) administered	Sample size	Margin of error	Kathleen Peters (R)	Alex Sink (D)	Undecided
St. Pete Polls	December 3, 2013	1,128	± 2.9%	34.6%	47.7%	12.2%
St. Pete Polls	November 18, 2013	1,252	± 2.8%	30.7%	49.7%	19.6%

=== Results ===
2014 Florida's 13th congressional district special election
Party	Candidate	Votes	%
Republican	David Jolly	89,167	48.52%
Democratic	Alex Sink	85,673	46.62%
Libertarian	Lucas Overby	8,919	4.85%
Write-ins		13	0.01%
Total votes		183,772	100.00%
Republican hold			
