= Kathleen Peters =

American politician (born 1961)

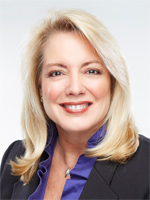

Member of the Pinellas County Commission from the 6th district
- Incumbent
- Assumed office January 2019
- Preceded by: J. J. Beyrouti

Member of the Florida House of Representatives from the 69th district
- In office November 6, 2012 – November 6, 2018
- Preceded by: Ray Pilon
- Succeeded by: Jennifer Webb

Personal details
- Born: February 27, 1961 (age 65) Northbrook, Illinois
- Party: Republican
- Spouse: Michael Peters
- Children: Christopher Peters, Steven Peters, Michael Peters, Adam Peters
- Education: St. Petersburg College (AA); Eckerd College (BA)
- Profession: Public affairs

Kathleen M. Peters (born February 27, 1961) is an American politician of the Republican Party and a former member of the Florida House of Representatives, representing the 69th District, which includes southern Pinellas County, stretching from Redington Shores to St. Pete Beach, from 2012 to 2018.

Peters currently serves on the Pinellas County Board of County Commissioners, having announced in 2017 that she would not seek re-election the Florida House in order to run for a seat on the commission.

== History ==
Peters was born in Northbrook, Illinois, in 1961, and moved to Florida in 1985, where she attended St. Petersburg College, where she received her associate degree, and Eckerd College, receiving a degree in human development. In 2008, Peters was elected to the South Pasadena City Commission, and in 2009, she was selected by her fellow Commissioners to serve as Mayor. She continued serving on the City Commission and as Mayor until 2012, and simultaneously worked as the Vice-President of Public Affairs at the Clearwater Regional Chamber of Commerce.

== Florida House of Representatives ==
In 2012, following the reconfiguration of Florida House districts, Peters opted to run in the newly created 69th District. She faced David Phillips and Jim Dobyns in the Republican primary, campaigning on education reform. She ended up comfortably defeating both of her opponents, winning 51% of the vote to Phillips's 36% and Dobyns's 13%. Advancing to the general election, she faced Josh Shulman, the Democratic nominee and a financial planner. Peters was endorsed by the Tampa Bay Times, predicting that she would be a "moderate Republican voice in Tallahassee" and praising her for her political experience. She ended up narrowly defeating Shulman, winning 52% of the vote to his 48%.

== 2014 congressional campaign ==
Following the death of Republican United States Congressman Bill Young on October 18, 2013, a special election was held to replace him. On November 19, 2013, Peters announced that she would run to replace him, declaring that she would fight "the weak-willed, the preening and the posturing men" responsible for the dysfunction of the federal government. At her campaign's kickoff, she was introduced by, among others, Young's son, Bill Young II, and State Senator Jack Latvala. In the Republican primary, she faced David Jolly, a former aide to Young, and retired General Mark Bircher. During the course of the campaign, Peters received the support of a number of serving members of Congress, including Diane Black, Lynn Jenkins, and Ann Wagner, all of whom sought to increase the number of Republican women in their caucus, and who helped Peters fundraise. She received the endorsement of the Tampa Bay Times in her bid, which noted that, following Young's death, "[T]he best-known and best-qualified potential candidates declined to run," but that Peters "has the local experience and temperament to succeed even though she has a lot to learn about federal issues." The Tampa Tribune, meanwhile, endorsed Jolly over Peters, criticizing her for having a "knowledge of the issues facing Congress" that "only skims the surface," though praising her for her "reputation for doggedness" and for her efforts in "pushing through a measure that eliminated a tax inequity affecting condominium owners." Ultimately, however, Peters was defeated by Jolly, who had consistently performed better than her in public polls and in terms of fundraising, and she received 31% of the vote to Jolly's 45% and Bircher's 24%. Jolly would go on to win the election against Alex Sink, the Democratic nominee and the former Chief Financial Officer of Florida.
