= Mark Bircher =

Retired American brigadier general

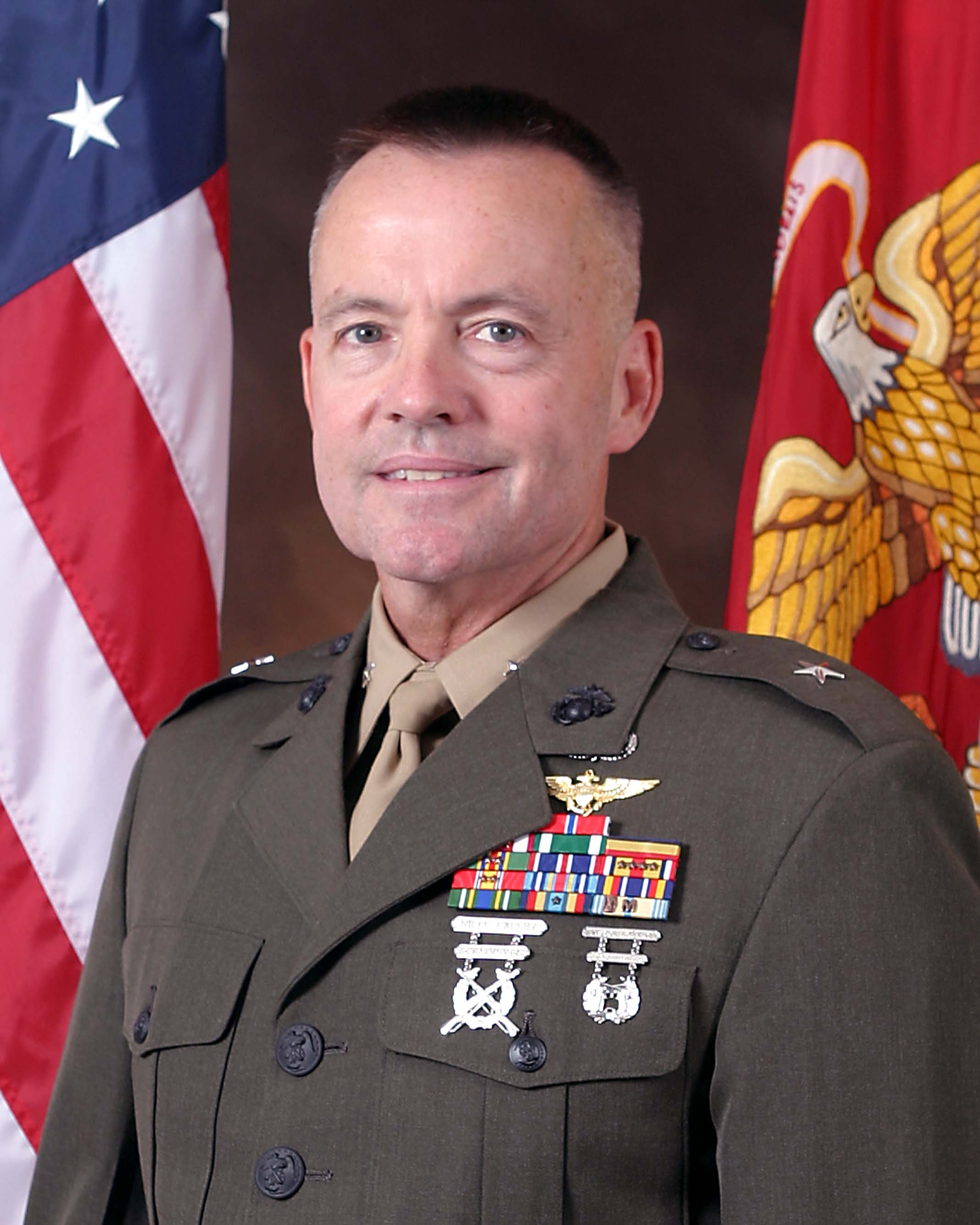
- Official portrait
- Born: June 25, 1953 (age 73); Pensacola, Florida, U.S.
- Allegiance: United States
- Branch: United States Marine Corps; Marine Corps Reserve
- Service years: 1976–2009
- Rank: Brigadier general
- Commands: United States Marine Corps Forces, South; 4th Marine Aircraft Wing; Marine Fighter Attack Squadron 142
- Conflicts: Iraq War
- Awards: Bronze Star
- Education: United States Naval Academy

Mark W. Bircher (born June 25, 1953) is a retired Marine Corps Reserve brigadier general, commercial pilot (Boeing 777), lawyer, scholar, and former Blue Angels pilot. He was a Republican Party candidate in Florida's 13th congressional district special election, 2014. He was the Republican candidate for the 2016 election in Florida's 13th congressional district.

Bircher is a graduate of the Naval Academy and the Navy Fighter Weapons School (TOPGUN). He became a fighter pilot and flew the A-4 Skyhawk and F/A-18 Hornet. He was awarded the Bronze Star. He flew with the Blue Angels for three years. In 2003 he deployed to Iraq. In 2009 he retired from the Marine Corps Reserve as a Brigadier General.

Bircher ran as a conservative candidate in the Republican primary in the 2014 special election for Florida's 13th congressional district. Bircher finished third with 24% of the vote, behind State Representative Kathleen Peters (29%) and lobbyist David Jolly (45%) who went on to defeat Alex Sink in the March 11, 2014 special election.

== Political positions ==
- Supports a balanced budget
- Opposes the Affordable Care Act

== Endorsements ==
- Combat Veterans For Congress PAC
- Former Congressman Allen West
- Republican Liberty Caucus
