= Community Service Foundation =

Organization based in Florida, US

The Community Service Foundation, founded in 1957 in Harbor Bluffs, Florida, is now headquartered in Clearwater, Florida. Its goal is to provide help on a local level to poor residents of Pinellas County. It started as a privately funded organization and has evolved into a regionally funded effort.

CSF's first project, in 1962, was a center in Ridgecrest, Florida for pre-teen children as an educational and recreational outlet. The Foundation and the Friends of Ridgecrest, from three adjoining communities, created a core lending library at the center, with an emphasis on books relevant to the community's culture - for example "Singing Heart", a small book about Marian Anderson written by Lenore Spivey. The community center still serves the area's residents 50 years later.

CSF also participated in President Lyndon B. Johnson's "VISTA" program, Volunteers in Service to America, training VISTA volunteers at a former migrant labor camp north of Bradenton in 1966.

The Foundation now focuses on affordable housing for low-income Pinellas County residents.

CSF was created in October 1957 by businessman Willis T. Spivey and his wife Lenore; for the first decade, the Foundation's office was in their home. Before her death, Willis and his first wife Dorothy, a Quaker, sponsored the Community Workshop Association in Wallinngford, Pennsylvania in the early 1950s. Spivey was the founder and CEO of The Spivey Company in Philadelphia, manufacturer of material handling systems. Born in Greenville, Georgia, he died in 1971 at age 84; Lenore died in 1978 at 78.

Executive Directors at CSF have included Thomas P. "Pat" Hardeman, Charles Mann for 31 years, Jerry Spilatro for 19 years, and current ED Perry Bean.
