= Ben Diamond =

American politician

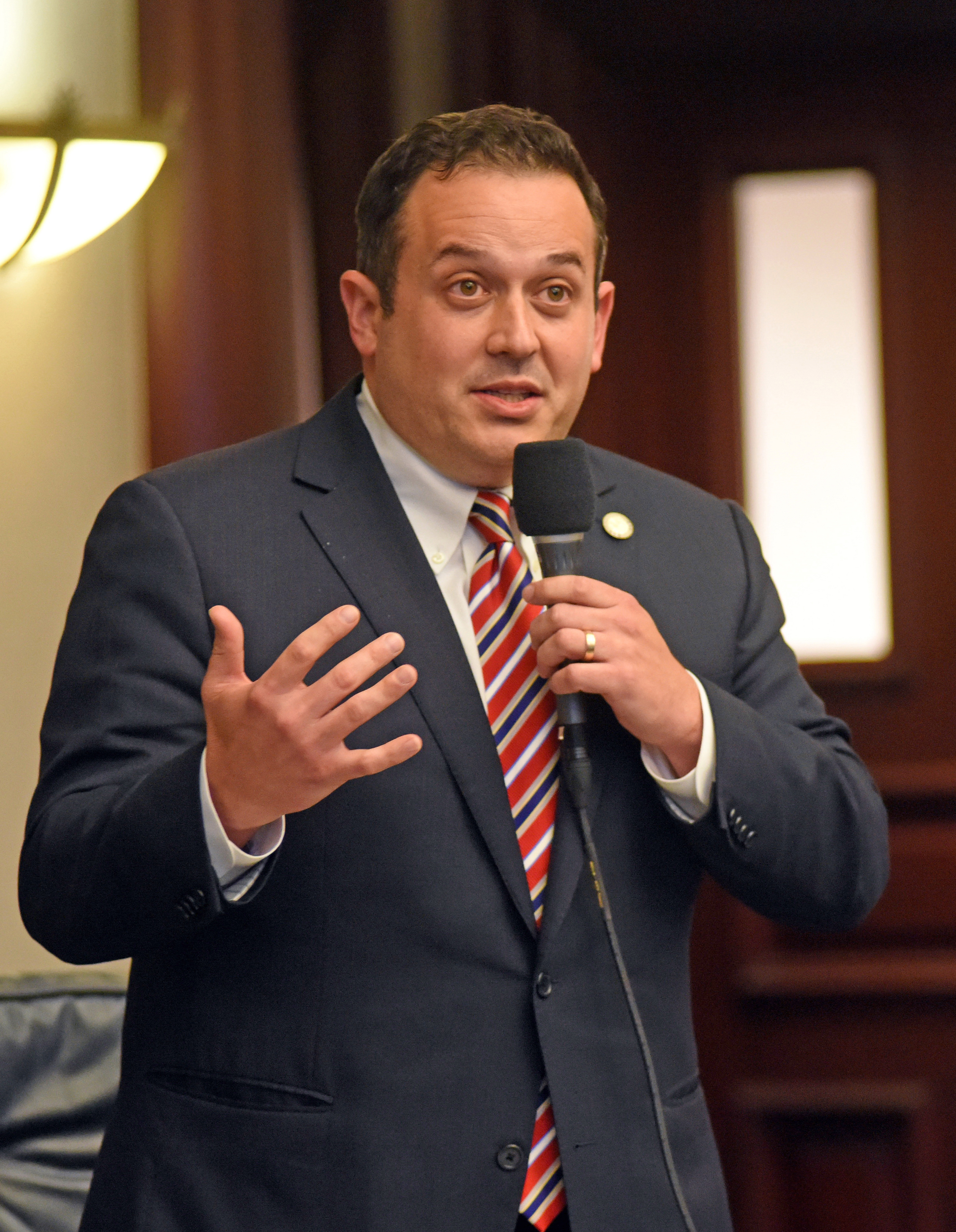

Member of the Florida House of Representatives from the 68th district
- In office November 8, 2016 – November 8, 2022
- Preceded by: Dwight Dudley
- Succeeded by: Lawrence McClure

Personal details
- Born: Benjamin Frank Diamond; October 9, 1978 (age 47) Clearwater, Florida, U.S.
- Party: Democratic
- Relatives: Dante Fascell (grandfather)
- Education: Yale University (BA); University of Florida (JD)

Benjamin Frank Diamond (born October 9, 1978) is an American attorney and politician who served from 2016 to 2022 as a member of the Florida House of Representatives from the 68th district, which includes most of the city of St. Petersburg, Florida, Pinellas County.

== Early life and education ==
Born in Clearwater, Florida, Diamond graduated from Yale University in 2000, and earned his Juris Doctor from the University of Florida Levin College of Law in 2003, where he was editor-in-chief of the Florida Law Review. Diamond's maternal grandfather was the late Representative Dante Fascell, who represented Dade and Monroe Counties in the United States House of Representatives for 19 consecutive terms, from 1955 to 1993.

== Career ==
Prior to his election to the state house, Diamond was a member of the board of directors of the Pinellas Suncoast Transit Authority (2014–2016), general counsel (2009–2011) and special counsel (2007–2009) to the Florida Chief Financial Officer, and law clerk to Judge Emmett Ripley Cox of the United States Court of Appeals for the Eleventh Circuit (2004–2005).

=== Florida House of Representatives ===
In the 2016 to 2018 term, Representative Diamond serves on the following House committees:

- Agriculture & Natural Resources Appropriations Subcommittee
- Agriculture & Property Rights Subcommittee
- Civil Justice & Claims Subcommittee
- Judiciary Committee
- Natural Resources & Public Lands Subcommittee

In the 2018 to 2020 term, Representative Diamond serves on the following House committees:

- Member, Appropriations Committee
- Ranking Minority Member, Judiciary Committee
- Member, Subcommittee on Civil Justice
- Member, Subcommittee on Insurance and Banking

=== 2022 U.S. House campaign ===
On May 10, 2021, Diamond announced his candidacy for Florida's 13th congressional district in the 2022 election. On May 17, 2022, he suspended his campaign due to being drawn out of the district.

Florida House of Representatives
Preceded by Dwight Dudley	Member of the Florida House of Representatives from the 68th district 2016–2022	Succeeded by Lindsay Cross
