= Bardmoor, Florida =

- Census-designated place
- Location of Bardmoor in Pinellas County, Florida.
- Coordinates: 27°51′31″N 82°44′58″W
- Country: United States
- State: Florida
- County: Pinellas

Area
  - Total: 2.27 sq mi (5.88 km^{2})
  - Land: 2.19 sq mi (5.68 km^{2})
  - Water: 0.081 sq mi (0.21 km^{2})
- Elevation: 16 ft (4.9 m)

Population (2020)
  - Total: 9,852
  - Density: 4,495.7/sq mi (1,735.79/km^{2})
- Time zone: UTC-5 (Eastern (EST))
  - Summer (DST): UTC-4 (EDT)
- Area code: 727
- FIPS code: 12-03480
- GNIS feature ID: 2583327

Bardmoor is a census-designated place (CDP) in Pinellas County, Florida, United States. As of the 2020 census, Bardmoor had a population of 9,852.

== Geography ==
Bardmoor lies between the cities of Pinellas Park and Seminole, with Pinellas Park to the east and Seminole to the southwest.

According to the United States Census Bureau, the CDP has a total area of 2.3 square miles (5.9 km^{2}), of which 2.2 square miles (5.7 km^{2}) is land and 0.08 square miles (0.2 km^{2}) (3.24%) is water.

== Demographics ==
Historical population
Census	Pop.	Note	%±
2010	9,732		—
2020	9,852		1.2%
U.S. Decennial Census

Bardmoor first appeared as a census designated place in the 2010 U.S. census.

=== Racial and ethnic composition ===
Bardmoor CDP, Florida – Racial and ethnic composition Note: the US Census treats Hispanic/Latino as an ethnic category. This table excludes Latinos from the racial categories and assigns them to a separate category. Hispanics/Latinos may be of any race.
Race / Ethnicity (NH = Non-Hispanic)	Pop 2010	Pop 2020	% 2010	% 2020
White alone (NH)	8,184	7,506	84.09%	76.19%
Black or African American alone (NH)	232	329	2.38%	3.34%
Native American or Alaska Native alone (NH)	31	38	0.32%	0.39%
Asian alone (NH)	415	498	4.26%	5.05%
Native Hawaiian or Pacific Islander alone (NH)	4	3	0.04%	0.03%
Other race alone (NH)	13	41	0.13%	0.42%
Mixed race or Multiracial (NH)	152	489	1.56%	4.96%
Hispanic or Latino (any race)	701	948	7.20%	9.62%
Total	9,732	9,852	100.00%	100.00%

=== 2020 census ===
As of the 2020 census, Bardmoor had a population of 9,852. The median age was 47.0 years. 18.0% of residents were under the age of 18 and 22.5% of residents were 65 years of age or older. For every 100 females there were 94.4 males, and for every 100 females age 18 and over there were 91.9 males age 18 and over.

100.0% of residents lived in urban areas, while 0.0% lived in rural areas.

There were 4,132 households in Bardmoor, of which 23.4% had children under the age of 18 living in them. Of all households, 46.8% were married-couple households, 17.3% were households with a male householder and no spouse or partner present, and 28.7% were households with a female householder and no spouse or partner present. About 29.0% of all households were made up of individuals and 15.2% had someone living alone who was 65 years of age or older.

There were 4,555 housing units, of which 9.3% were vacant. The homeowner vacancy rate was 2.1% and the rental vacancy rate was 5.7%.

Racial composition as of the 2020 census
Race	Number	Percent
White	7,731	78.5%
Black or African American	362	3.7%
American Indian and Alaska Native	49	0.5%
Asian	498	5.1%
Native Hawaiian and Other Pacific Islander	3	0.0%
Some other race	260	2.6%
Two or more races	949	9.6%
