= Jennifer Webb =

American politician from Florida, United States

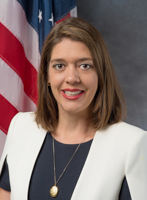

Member of the Florida House of Representatives from the 69th district
- In office November 6, 2018 – November 3, 2020
- Preceded by: Kathleen Peters
- Succeeded by: Linda Chaney

Personal details
- Born: December 12, 1979 (age 46)
- Party: Democratic
- Education: Louisiana State University (BA); University of South Florida (MA)

Jennifer Necole Webb (born December 12, 1979) is an American politician from Florida. She served one term in the Florida House of Representatives, representing parts of coastal southwestern Pinellas County from 2018 to 2020.

== Political career ==
Webb was elected in the general election on November 6, 2018, winning 53 percent of the vote over 47 percent of Republican candidate Ray Blacklidge.

Webb lost re-election to the Florida House of Representative to Linda Chaney (R) 47.5% to 52.5% in November 2020. During reapportionment, this district was redrawn making it less competitive.

Webb was known for composing an agenda her constituents would support regardless of political party and was a highly successful Freshman legislator. She worked in a bi-partisan fashion and passed condo insurance reform and consumer protection bills. She worked with Republican legislators to push forward protections for LGBTQ+ community. She crafted legislation to protect Florida’s water ways and environment by improving waste water infrastructure, removing derelict vessels sooner, and allowing schools to reduce energy bills by placing solar panels to their roofs. She earned NAMI's Legislator of the Year Award for her focus on reforming behavioral health policy silo and connected with constituents over the impact suicide and substance use has on so many families. Her advocacy on behalf of cities in her district and ability to bring home resources earned her widespread bipartisan support from local elected officials across the county. She was the first out lesbian to serve in the legislature.
