= Florida's 13th congressional district =

U.S. House district for Florida

Coordinates: 27°51′58″N 82°44′54″W

- Map of district boundaries
- Representative: Anna Paulina Luna; R–St. Petersburg
- Area: 429 mi^{2} (1,110 km^{2})
- Distribution: 99.99% urban; 0.01% rural
- Population (2025): 754,090
- Median household income: $78,581
- Ethnicity: 74.0% White; 11.1% Hispanic; 6.6% Black; 4.1% Two or more races; 3.5% Asian; 0.8% other
- Cook PVI: R+6

Florida's 13th congressional district is an electoral district for the U.S. Congress on Florida's Gulf Coast, assigned to Pinellas County. The district includes Largo, Clearwater, and Palm Harbor. In the 2020 redistricting cycle, most of St. Petersburg facing Tampa Bay was redistricted into the 14th district, while the rest of Pinellas County formerly in the 12th district became included in the 13th district.

From 2003 to 2012, it encompassed all of Sarasota, DeSoto, and Hardee Counties; as well as most of Manatee County, except for a small northern coastal portion that was then located in the neighboring 11th congressional district. It also included a small section of Charlotte County. Most of that district is now the 16th congressional district, while the current 13th covers most of what had been the 10th district from 1993 to 2013.

The district is currently represented by Republican Anna Paulina Luna.

== Characteristics ==
=== 2015 court-ordered redistricting ===
In July 2015 the Florida Supreme Court overturned the boundaries of the state's congressional districts, ruling that "the maps were the product of an unconstitutional political gerrymandering". It expressed its distrust of lawmakers and "provided detailed instructions on how to repair the flawed map in time for the 2016 election."

In 2012, the Legislature drew these districts so that District 14 crossed Tampa Bay from Hillsborough County, splitting Pinellas County and the City of St. Petersburg to include a portion of the black population in southern Pinellas County in District 14. The Challengers contended that the Legislature's configuration of these districts—which 'added more Democratic voters to an already safely Democratic District 14, while ensuring that District 13 was more favorable to the Republican Party'—was directly connected to the trial court's finding that the enacted map was unconstitutionally drawn to favor the Republican Party.

With the future of the boundaries of the district undetermined, the Republican Party may abandon it. This was where (under slightly different boundaries) William C. Cramer was elected to Congress, and he helped build the Republican Party in Florida and the South. He held office from 1954 to 1970. Republican C.W. Bill Young essentially represented the district from 1971 to his death in 2013. But demographics have continued to change, and more recently it has been a swing district. Several Democrats may be interested in running for the seat.

=== 2022 DeSantis redistricting ===
Despite the July 2015 Florida Supreme Court ruling overturning a blatantly redistricted congressional map, in which the 2012 legislature redrew Tampa's 14th District to include portions of the City of Saint Petersburg and black populations in southern Pinellas County, Governor DeSantis' administration redrew Pinellas County's 13th District to be exclusive of these known Democratic areas. Under the Fair Districts constitutional amendments that Florida voters approved in 2010, legislators are forbidden to draw districts that intentionally favor or disfavor incumbents or parties. In September 2023 Circuit Judge J. Lee Marsh determined the redistricting plan pushed by Ron DeSantis violated the state constitution and is prohibited from being used for any future U.S. congressional elections. Despite the ruling, the recent ruling by the Florida Supreme Court allowed the districts to stand and thus overruled the circut court ruling. https://www.theguardian.com/us-news/2025/jul/17/florida-supreme-court-congressional-map

== Composition ==
For the 118th and successive Congresses (based on redistricting following the 2020 census), the district contains all or portions of the following counties and communities:

Pinellas County (37)

Bardmoor, Bay Pines, Bear Creek, Belleair, Belleair Beach, Belleair Bluffs, Belleair Shore, Clearwater, Dunedin, East Lake, Feather Sound (part; also 14th), Greenbriar, Gulfport, Harbor Bluffs, Indian Rocks Beach, Indian Shores, Kenneth City, Largo, Lealman (part; also 14th), Madeira Beach, North Redington Beach, Oldsmar, Palm Harbor, Pinellas Park, Redington Beach, Redington Shores, Ridgecrest, Safety Harbor, St. Pete Beach, St. Petersburg (part; also 14th), Seminole, South Highpoint, South Pasadena, Tarpon Springs, Tierra Verde, Treasure Island, West Lealman

== List of members representing the district ==
Representative	Party	Years	Cong ress	Electoral history	Congressional map
District created January 3, 1973
William Lehman (North Miami Beach)	Democratic	January 3, 1973 – January 3, 1983	93rd 94th 95th 96th 97th	Elected in 1972. Re-elected in 1974. Re-elected in 1976. Re-elected in 1978. Re-elected in 1980. Redistricted to the 17th district.	1973–1983 [data missing]
Connie Mack III (Cape Coral)	Republican	January 3, 1983 – January 3, 1989	98th 99th 100th	Elected in 1982. Re-elected in 1984. Re-elected in 1986. Retired to run for U.S. Senator.	1983–1993 [data missing]
Porter Goss (Sanibel)	Republican	January 3, 1989 – January 3, 1993	101st 102nd	Elected in 1988. Re-elected in 1990. Redistricted to the 14th district.	1983–1993 [data missing]
Dan Miller (Bradenton)	Republican	January 3, 1993 – January 3, 2003	103rd 104th 105th 106th 107th	Elected in 1992. Re-elected in 1994. Re-elected in 1996. Re-elected in 1998. Re-elected in 2000. Retired.	1993–2003 [data missing]
Katherine Harris (Sarasota)	Republican	January 3, 2003 – January 3, 2007	108th 109th	Elected in 2002. Re-elected in 2004. Retired to run for U.S. Senator.	2003–2013
Vern Buchanan (Sarasota)	Republican	January 3, 2007 – January 3, 2013	110th 111th 112th	Elected in 2006. Re-elected in 2008. Re-elected in 2010. Redistricted to the 16th district.	2003–2013
Bill Young (Indian Shores)	Republican	January 3, 2013 – October 18, 2013	113th	Redistricted from the 10th district and re-elected in 2012. Died.	2013–2017
Vacant		October 18, 2013 – March 13, 2014	113th		2013–2017
David Jolly (Indian Shores)	Republican	March 13, 2014 – January 3, 2017	113th 114th	Elected to finish Young's term. Re-elected later in 2014. Lost re-election.	2013–2017
Charlie Crist (St. Petersburg)	Democratic	January 3, 2017 – August 31, 2022	115th 116th 117th	Elected in 2016. Re-elected in 2018. Re-elected in 2020. Retired and resigned to run for Governor of Florida.	2017–2023
Vacant		August 31, 2022 – January 3, 2023	117th		2017–2023
Anna Paulina Luna (St. Petersburg)	Republican	January 3, 2023 – present	118th 119th	Elected in 2022. Re-elected in 2024. Re-elected in 2026.	2023–2027

== Recent election results from statewide races ==
Year	Office	Results
2008	President	Obama 51% - 48%
2010	Governor	Sink 50.2% - 49.8%
2010	Attorney General	Bondi 55% - 38%
2010	Chief Financial Officer	Atwater 57% - 33%
2012	President	Romney 50.1% - 49.9%
2012	Senate	Nelson 59% - 41%
2014	Governor	Crist 53% - 47%
2016	President	Trump 51% - 44%
2016	Senate	Rubio 52% - 43%
2018	Senate	Scott 51% - 49%
2018	Governor	DeSantis 51% - 47%
2018	Attorney General	Moody 56% - 41%
2018	Chief Financial Officer	Patronis 54% - 46%
2020	President	Trump 53% - 46%
2022	Senate	Rubio 56% - 42%
2022	Governor	DeSantis 58% - 41%
2022	Attorney General	Moody 60% - 40%
2022	Chief Financial Officer	Patronis 58% - 42%
2024	President	Trump 55% - 44%
2024	Senate	Scott 54% - 44%

== Election results ==
=== 2002 ===
Florida's 13th congressional district election (2002)
Party	Candidate	Votes	%
Republican	Katherine Harris	139,048	54.79
Democratic	Jan Schneider	114,739	45.21
Total votes		253,787	100.00
Turnout			
Republican hold			

=== 2004 ===
Florida's 13th congressional district election (2004)
Party	Candidate	Votes	%
Republican	Katherine Harris (incumbent)	190,477	55.30
Democratic	Jan Schneider	153,961	44.70
Total votes		344,438	100.00
Turnout			
Republican hold			

=== 2006 ===
Florida's 13th congressional district election (2006)
Party	Candidate	Votes	%
Republican	Vern Buchanan	119,309	50.08
Democratic	Christine Jennings	118,940	49.92
Total votes		238,249	100.00
Turnout			
Republican hold			

Election officials certified Buchanan as the winner of the race over Jennings by 369 votes. Buchanan was declared the winner after a mandatory recount and analysis of alleged voting machine errors in the race. The primary controversy in this race was that over 18,000 ballots (or roughly one in six) cast in Sarasota County apparently did not register a vote for this race, far higher than in the two previous elections involving Jan Schneider, but lower than the undervote in 2000. Sarasota County voted for Jennings by a six-point margin. Jennings refused to concede the race and pursued administrative and legal challenges to the result, including an appeal for an investigation of the election with the House Administration Committee. Preliminary results from an investigation by Congress's Government Accountability Office concluded that there was no evidence that the voting machines caused the high undervote, but that inadequate testing made it impossible to prove their complete reliability. Sarasota County has since moved to optical scanned paper ballots as a result of a 2006 referendum vote.

According to a statistical study published in 2008, the missing votes were caused by the ballot screen layout. The authors' best estimate on what the result would have been, had this problem not occurred, gave victory to Jennings at a 99.9% confidence level, and a mean margin of victory for her of 639 votes.

=== 2008 ===
Florida's 13th congressional district election (2008)
Party	Candidate	Votes	%
Republican	Vern Buchanan (incumbent)	204,382	55.43
Democratic	Christine Jennings	137,967	37.42
Independent	Jan Schneider	20,989	5.69
Independent	Don Baldauf	5,358	1.45
Total votes		368,696	100.00
Turnout			
Republican hold			

=== 2010 ===
Florida's 13th congressional district election (2010)
Party	Candidate	Votes	%
Republican	Vern Buchanan (incumbent)	183,811	68.86
Democratic	James T. Golden	83,123	31.14
Total votes		266,934	100.00
Turnout			
Republican hold			

=== 2012 ===
Florida's 13th congressional district election (2012)
Party	Candidate	Votes	%
Republican	Bill Young (redistricted incumbent)	189,609	57.57
Democratic	Jessica Ehrlich	139,742	42.43
Total votes		329,347	100.00
Turnout			
Republican hold			

=== 2014 (special) ===
Florida's 13th congressional district special election (2014)
Party	Candidate	Votes	%
Republican	David Jolly	89,095	48.52
Democratic	Alex Sink	85,639	46.64
Libertarian	Lucas Overby	8,893	4.84
Total votes		183,927	100
Turnout			
Republican hold			

The district's seat was vacated following the death of Bill Young. A special election was held on March 11, 2014 to replace him. The election was won by Republican David Jolly with 48.52% of the vote over one-time gubernatorial candidate Democrat Alex Sink's 46.64% and Libertarian candidate Lucas Overby's 4.84%.

=== 2014 ===
Florida's 13th congressional district election (2014)
Party	Candidate	Votes	%
Republican	David Jolly (incumbent)	168,172	75.22
Libertarian	Lucas Overby	55,318	24.74
Write-in	Michael Stephen Levinson	86	.04
Total votes		223,576	100.00
Republican hold			

=== 2016 ===
Florida's 13th congressional district election (2016)
Party	Candidate	Votes	%
Democratic	Charlie Crist	184,693	51.90
Republican	David Jolly (incumbent)	171,149	48.10
Total votes		355,842	100.00
Democratic gain from Republican			

=== 2018 ===
Florida's 13th congressional district election (2018)
Party	Candidate	Votes	%
Democratic	Charlie Crist (incumbent)	182,717	57.64
Republican	George Buck	134,254	42.36
Total votes		316,971	100.00
Democratic hold			

=== 2020 ===
2020 United States House of Representatives elections in Florida
Party	Candidate	Votes	%
Democratic	Charlie Crist (incumbent)	215,405	53.04%
Republican	Anna Paulina Luna	190,713	46.96%
Independent Republican	Jacob Curnow (write-in)	7	0.01%
Total votes		406,125	100.0
Democratic hold			

=== 2022 ===
2022 United States House of Representatives elections in Florida
Party	Candidate	Votes	%
Republican	Anna Paulina Luna	181,487	53.14%
Democratic	Eric Lynn	153,876	45.06%
Libertarian	Frank Craft	6,163	1.80%
Total votes		341,526	100.00
Republican gain from Democratic			

=== 2024 ===
2024 United States House of Representatives elections in Florida
Party	Candidate	Votes	%
Republican	Anna Paulina Luna (incumbent)	225,636	54.82%
Democratic	Whitney Fox	185,930	45.17%
Write-In		27	0.01%
Total votes		411,593	100.00
Republican hold			
