= David Jolly =

American attorney and politician (born 1972)

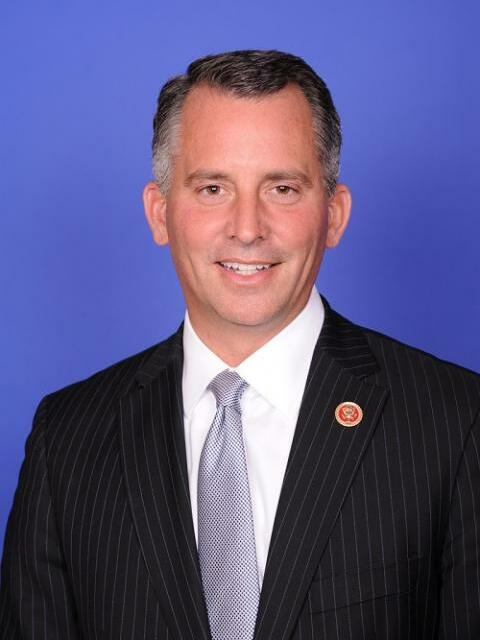
- Official portrait, 2014

Member of the U.S. House of Representatives from Florida's 13th district
- In office March 11, 2014 – January 3, 2017 (Note: Jolly's official service begins on the date of the special election, while he was not sworn in until March 13, 2014.)
- Preceded by: Bill Young
- Succeeded by: Charlie Crist

Personal details
- Born: David Wilson Jolly; October 31, 1972 (age 54) Dunedin, Florida, U.S.
- Party: Republican (before 2018); Independent (2018–2022) (Note: From 2020–2022, he was a member of the Serve America Movement, which was not a registered political party.); Forward (2022–2025); Democratic (2025–present)
- Spouse(s): Carrie Jolly (m. 1999; div. 2014) Laura Donahoe (m. 2015)
- Children: 2
- Education: Emory University (BA); George Mason University (JD)
- Website: Campaign website

David Wilson Jolly (born October 31, 1972) is an American lawyer and politician who was the Democratic nominee for the 2026 Florida gubernatorial election. Jolly served as the U.S. representative for Florida's 13th congressional district from 2014 to 2017 as a Republican. After leaving office, he became a prominent critic of President Donald Trump and a political commentator for national cable news outlets.

Jolly worked for Republican U.S. representative Bill Young from 1995 to 2006, including as his general counsel. Jolly worked briefly at a Washington securities firm, and was a vice president for the Florida-based Boston Finance Group. He had also been a lobbyist at Van Scoyoc Associates, but was removed from the lobby register prior to running for office.

In September 2018, Jolly left the Republican Party. In April 2025, Jolly joined the Democratic Party to run in the Democratic primary for the 2026 Florida gubernatorial election. He selected Gwen Graham as his running mate. He won the primary but lost to Republican congressman Byron Donalds in the general election.

== Early life and education ==
Jolly was born on October 31, 1972, in Dunedin, Florida, at Mease Dunedin Hospital. He is the son of Judith and Lawson Jolly Jr, a Baptist pastor. Jolly is a fifth-generation Floridian. His parents lived in Clearwater, Florida, moving to Miami when Jolly was three, and then Dade City, Florida, after 11 years. Jolly has two older siblings. His brother, Lawson III, had gone on to work at Saint Leo University as of 2014, and his sister Jennifer had become an author, singer and Bible study teacher.

On June 9, 1989, at age 16, Jolly was involved in an automobile accident that killed a pedestrian; authorities determined that he was not at fault. Jolly participated in debate at school, having taken to public speaking after his father. He graduated from Pasco High School in 1990. In 2016, Jolly's parents had their home burglarized, and they lost artifacts of family history.

Jolly said that he initially considered becoming a medical doctor in college, but did poorly in biology class. He then majored in history, having had an interest in the American Civil War, the Pacific theater of World War II, and the assassination of John F. Kennedy. He attended school while working under congressman Bill Young. He received his B.A. degree in history from Emory University in 1994 and his J.D. degree cum laude from the George Mason University School of Law in 2001.

== Early career ==
Before running for political office, Jolly initially worked for the Republican National Committee as a newspaper clipper, and later as an intern for U.S. representative Dan Miller of Sarasota, who suggested he work under Republican U.S. representative Bill Young. Young attended Indian Rocks Baptist church, where Jolly's father had a friend preaching; he recommended Young hire Jolly.

Jolly worked under Young full time from 1995 to 2006 in various positions, with a brief break for six months in 2001 when he worked at a Washington securities firm. In 2002, Jolly became Young's general counsel and held that position until he left in 2006. He served as the personal attorney for Young's family as well.

In 2007, Jolly joined Washington, D.C. firm Van Scoyoc Associates as a lobbyist. In 2011, he left Van Scoyoc to open his own lobbying firm, Three Bridges Advisors. During his time as a lobbyist he made political donations to both Republicans (about $36,000) and Democrats (about $30,000). Jolly had his name removed from the lobby registry to run for the vacant House seat. At the time, Jolly was working as vice president of the Clearwater-based investment company Boston Finance Group.

== U.S. House of Representatives (2014–2017) ==
=== 2014 special election ===
After being behind in the early tallies, Jolly won the 2014 election on March 11, with 48.4% of the vote. He was sworn into office on March 13.

Jolly had won the Republican nomination on January 14, 2014, over Mark Bircher and Kathleen Peters, winning a plurality of 45% of the vote. Jolly faced Democratic nominee Alex Sink and a Libertarian candidate, Lucas Overby, in the special election. The race received national attention as possibly forecasting the mid-term elections that were coming in November of that year and became the most expensive Congressional race in history, with approximately $11M spent, $9M of it by outside groups. During the campaign there was friction between the National Republican Congressional Committee and Jolly; the RNC thought Jolly's campaign was inept and Jolly criticized the negative ads run by the RNC.

Jolly ran for reelection to a full term in November 2014. He was unopposed in the Republican primary and no Democrat ran against him in the general election. His only challenger was Lucas Overby, the Libertarian nominee who came in third in the special election one year prior. Jolly defeated Overby with 75% of the vote.

=== 2016 U.S. Senate election ===
On July 20, 2015, Jolly announced that he was giving up his seat to run for the United States Senate seat being vacated by Marco Rubio, who was not running for reelection due to his bid for the U.S. presidency. As of August 2015, it appeared that Jolly would face several opponents in the August 30, 2016, Republican primary election, including U.S. Representative Ron DeSantis and Lieutenant Governor of Florida Carlos López-Cantera. However, on June 17, 2016, after Rubio reversed his decision, Jolly withdrew from the Senate race to run for re-election to the House, citing "unfinished business".

=== 2016 general election ===
In his bid for a second full term, Jolly faced former Florida Governor and St. Petersburg resident Charlie Crist, a former Republican who had turned Democratic after a brief stint as an independent. He found himself in a district that had been made significantly more Democratic after a court threw out Florida's original congressional map. Notably, the new district absorbed a heavily Democratic portion of southern Pinellas County, including almost all of St. Petersburg; some of the more Democratic portions of St. Petersburg had previously been in the Tampa-based 14th District.

Ultimately, Jolly lost to Crist by 51.9% to 48.1%. Jolly's defeat ended a 62-year hold on this St. Petersburg-based district by the GOP. William Cramer had won the seat for the Republicans in 1954, handing it to Young in 1970.

=== Tenure ===
According to Politico, Jolly was known for his centrist stances in U.S. Congress, where he served one partial and one full term as a Republican. During his Congressional tenure, Jolly opposed the Patient Protection and Affordable Care Act, but later he stated on an interview with MSNBC that during unemployment he had a new appreciation for its use as a "safety net". He voted against Republican Speaker Paul Ryan's budget, saying that it would have impacted Medicare. In 2016, Jolly said that he was "pro-life".

In his first year in office, Jolly co-sponsored an emergency U.S. Department of Veterans Affairs (VA) bill regarding backlog issues; the bill passed. He had the Water Resources Reform and Development Act amended to reauthorize beach renourishment efforts for Treasure Island, Florida. He introduced a reauthorization for the Garrett Lee Smith Memorial Act, and a flood insurance bill. He proposed requiring U.S. Congress to work a full workweek; he said, "I would respectfully request that your subcommittee require for any week that Congress is in session in Washington, D.C., that such session run from 8:00 a.m. on Monday until 6:00 p.m. on Friday. Simply put, a workweek is a workweek. Our efforts should reflect those of every other working American.

==== Stop Act (2016) ====
Jolly introduced the bipartisan "Stop Act" in 2016 to prohibit federally elected officials from directly soliciting campaign funds or donations on the belief that post-Citizens United fundraising was taking an excessive amount of their time away from their elected duties.

==== Campaign Wikipedia edits ====
In April 2016, Jolly's United States Senate campaign spokesperson Sarah Bascom confirmed that the campaign had made edits to his Wikipedia page to remove information about Jolly that included references to the Church of Scientology (Note: The Church's Clearwater, Florida base, located in the congressional district he then represented, hosted charity events he and his wife attended, such as the Fashions with Flair runway.) and to his lobbying activities, alleging that the posts presented a "public negative narrative" against him, and she accused an unnamed rival campaign of adding "propaganda" to the article. Jolly called the removal "a careless staff mistake" and said that he stands by his record and wants the public to be fully informed.

==== Rankings ====
In 2016, Jolly was ranked as the 48th most bipartisan member of the U.S. House of Representatives during the 114th United States Congress (and the fourth most bipartisan House Rep. from Florida) by The Lugar Center and the McCourt School of Public Policy.

==== Congressional Committee assignments ====
- Committee on Appropriations
  - Subcommittee on Commerce, Justice, Science, and Related Agencies
  - Subcommittee on Military Construction, Veterans Affairs, and Related Agencies
  - Subcommittee on Transportation, Housing and Urban Development, and Related Agencies

== Between campaigns (2017–2026) ==
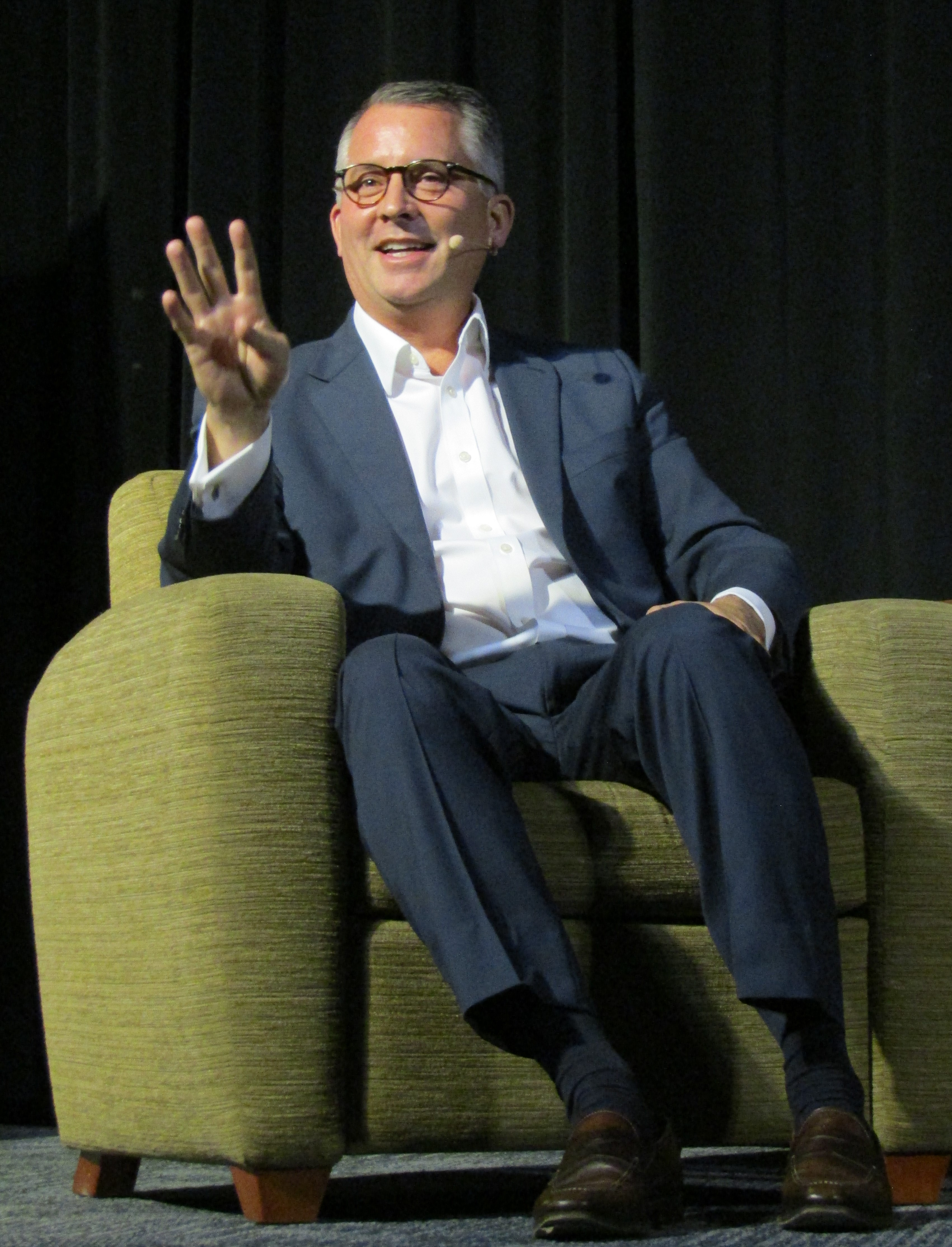
Jolly in 2018

Since leaving his Congressional office, Jolly has participated regularly as a political commentator on cable news sources such as CNN and MSNBC; in this capacity he has been critical of President Donald Trump. He considered running for lieutenant governor of Florida in 2018 on a bipartisan ticket, with former Democratic congressman Patrick Murphy as the candidate for governor. They conducted a speaking tour around the state. Jolly ultimately decided not to run for any public office in 2018.

In October 2018, Jolly appeared on HBO's Real Time with Bill Maher and said that he and his wife, Laura, had left the Republican Party. In April 2025, Jolly registered as a Democrat.

In July 2018, Jolly became executive vice president and principal of Shumaker Advisors Florida, LLC, a wholly owned subsidiary of the Shumaker, Loop, and Kendrick law firm, at their Tampa office. In making the announcement, the firm said he would be working on ballot initiatives and community issues, including the effort to build a new stadium for the Tampa Bay Rays major league baseball team.

== 2026 gubernatorial campaign ==
After formally joining the Democratic Party that April, in June 2025 Jolly announced a campaign for governor of Florida for the 2026 election. His running mate is former Democratic congresswoman Gwen Graham from Florida's 2nd congressional district, with whom he served in the House of Representatives, and the runner-up in the Democratic gubernatorial primary in 2018.

Jolly speaking at his final campaign rally in Broward County, Florida.

Jolly's campaign initially agreed to two debates: a moderated forum at Tampa's Tiger Bay Club and a roundtable at CBS Miami. Jolly later refused to debate his Republican opponent Byron Donalds, particularly in the form of a "one-on-one" debate. Jolly said that debating Donalds would not create a "constructive, honest conversation" because he was acting in "bad faith". Jolly said that Donalds had attempted to "set his own rules" without first confirming logistics such as schedules and debate formats to Jolly's campaign staff.

== Political positions ==
=== Abortion ===
Jolly states that he is pro-choice, having shifted his position on the issue after leaving the Republican Party, and he supports Florida restoring reproductive freedom and codification of the Roe v. Wade and Casey v. Planned Parenthood framework. He said that having grown up in an evangelical household as the son of a preacher, he had previously conflated being religious with opposing Roe. He affirmed his belief and change in perspective that abortion rights should be protected by law, adding that, if elected governor, he would introduce legislation to codify abortion rights. By July 2025, he was endorsed by the leaders of Florida's pro-choice movement, including Gwen Graham, who wrote that they trusted him and his change in perspective.

=== AI data centers ===
Jolly is opposed to AI data centers in Florida. In his 2026 campaign, he said, "I have pledged to issue a one-year moratorium on hyperscale data centers on my first day in office." He said data centers may cause local issues, such as for energy and water resources, noise pollution, and quality of life. He said he would commission studies into the topic, and that it "could lead to a full ban. The bottom line is I don't think we need data centers in the state of Florida." Jolly said, "They are rushing to build these things for reasons of profit for the industry, but not out of public interest."

=== Education ===
Jolly proposed a 10-year public education plan for Florida if elected governor, including increasing teacher pay by 30% to bring salaries closer to the national average. He said he would fund reinvestment into education with revenue from existing state taxes on tourists visiting Florida. He said, "I just don't think we have a crisis in convention centers. I think we have a crisis in public education, and so I do think we should have a statewide conversation about how we use tourist development tax dollars."

Jolly stated that he would direct Florida's state university system to prioritize the admittance of qualified in-state students. He said "we have got to lean into opening more slots for Florida students." He has called for reforms to the universal school voucher program. About the ability of state voucher-funded private schools to eject students who underperform academically, Jolly said, "You should not be allowed to just kick the kid out and say thank you for the $8,500."

Jolly stated that he would not participate in culture wars, arguing that "to bring politicians into the classrooms and the bedrooms and the doctor's offices, where the results are often communities who have already been marginalized, and are now further marginalized, I just think that's the wrong direction."

=== Environment ===
In 2015, Jolly pushed to extend the ban on oil drilling in the gulf off Florida. In January 2015, Jolly announced plans to introduce a bill that would extend the reforms of the federal flood insurance program. Jolly encouraged the U.S. House to extend the Treasure Island beach renourishment project.

=== Firearms ===
Jolly initially supported a broad interpretation of the Second Amendment but has since advocated for stricter firearm regulations. He has expressed support for measures such as licensing, registration, and insurance requirements for gun ownership. He has cited the 2016 Pulse nightclub shooting as a turning point, noting his participation as the only Republican joining Democrats on the House floor to call for legislative action. Jolly now supports comprehensive background checks, including for private and intra-family transfers, as well as an assault weapons ban. He has stated that he views unlimited and largely unrestricted access to firearms as a primary contributor to gun violence. He said that Republicans are lying when they say that gun owners, not a lack of gun control, are the problem in cases of gun violence and mass shootings. Speaking about firearms policy, Jolly said: "I do believe the Second Amendment is a fundamental right, but I don't believe it's beyond the reach of regulation, and I believe it's appropriate to look at regulations that ultimately keep the guns out of the hands of criminals."

Jolly said he wants the votes of gun owners because he respects their rights and believes that they are not the problem, but rather that Florida's lack of gun violence prevention laws are. He argues that no law-abiding gun-owning voters will be hurt by his proposals which will "protect their children".

=== Foreign policy and border security ===
Jolly supported sending special operations forces overseas, securing the U.S. borders, increasing the vetting process for legal immigrants, and increasing surveillance of suspected domestic terrorists. In February 2014, Jolly introduced the "Naval Station Guantanamo Bay Protection Act" bill.

=== LGBTQ+ rights ===
In July 2014, Jolly declared support for legalizing same-sex marriage. Although he does not personally support same sex-marriage due to his Christian faith, he explained that "the sanctity of one’s marriage should be defined by their faith and by their church, not by their state", and that this position was consistent with his support of limited government and the protection of personal liberties.

Jolly is opposed to transgender women in women's sports and states that he will not change the Fairness in Women's Sports Act, but that he "[hopes] to restore decency in how we approach it." When asked about his support of gender-affirming care for minors, Jolly states that he supported parents' rights to make medical decisions for their children without government interference, and that "I simply subscribe to the old-school Republican position that government should stay out of your life, out of your doctor's office, and out of your bedroom".

In August 2026, following an attack ad by his Republican opponent Byron Donalds centered on his implied support of transgender rights (stemming from a clip from an appearance on an LGBTQ+ podcast that was deceptively presented out of context), Jolly stated that "local communities should be able to celebrate their own and that government should stay out of your medical decisions."

=== Party affiliation ===
When he was registered Republican, Jolly commented about his relation to conservatism. In 2015, he said, "I am as conservative as they come. I'm not a 'shut government down' conservative. I am a 'keep government open' conservative. Our brand of Republican politics, our message, is right for the state of Florida."

In 2025, Jolly changed his party affiliation to Democratic. In response to autopsies of the 2024 U.S. presidential election, he said, "Leading Democrats today who come out and say, 'oh, we've got to change who we are, we have to change our values,' they're wrong. They're wrong. The Democratic Party's values are absolutely right and don't need to be changed."

Jolly states that, unlike Charlie Crist, who has commented, "I didn't leave the party. The [Republican] party left me," his experience differs as Jolly himself left the Republican Party after changing his views. He argues that this is a strength, not a weakness, as opposed to what his critics say, because America "needs more politicians willing to admit they were wrong" and evolve to meet the moment where voters currently are. He further contends that many voters have also changed their beliefs in the past few years.

=== U.S. debt ===
Jolly supported the Balanced Budget Amendment and said he would have voted to raise the debt limit in early 2014.

=== Veterans ===
In July 2015, Jolly introduced the "Veterans Health Care Freedom Act" bill.

== Personal life ==
Jolly is a Baptist, saying he is "a person who speaks about my faith". Other than the Bible, he says that two books that influenced him were Year of Dangerous Days by Nicholas Griffin, and The Soul of a Tree: A Woodworker's Reflections by George Nakashima.

Jolly and his first wife, Carrie, divorced on January 16, 2014. The divorce stemmed from a rumored affair with his then work subordinate Laura Donahoe.

Jolly married Laura Donahoe on July 3, 2015. They have two children.

== Electoral history ==
=== 2014 ===
Florida's 13th Congressional District special election Republican primary results, 2014
Party	Candidate	Votes	%
Republican	David Jolly	20,435	44.60
Republican	Kathleen Peters	14,172	30.94
Republican	Mark Bircher	11,203	24.46
Total votes		45,810	100

Florida's 13th Congressional District special election, 2014
Party	Candidate	Votes	%
Republican	David Jolly	89,099	48.43
Democratic	Alex Sink	85,642	46.55
Libertarian	Lucas Overby	8,893	4.83
N/A	Write-ins	328	0.18
Total votes		183,962	100
Republican hold			

Florida's 13th Congressional District election, 2014
Party	Candidate	Votes	%
Republican	David Jolly (incumbent)	168,172	75.22
Libertarian	Lucas Overby	55,318	24.74
Write-in	Michael Stephen Levinson	86	.04
Total votes		223,576	100.00
Republican hold			

=== 2016 ===
Florida's 13th Congressional District Election, 2016
Party	Candidate	Votes	%
Democratic	Charlie Crist	184,693	51.90
Republican	David Jolly (incumbent)	171,149	48.10
Total votes		355,842	100.00
Democratic gain from Republican			

== Notes ==
U.S. House of Representatives
Preceded by Bill Young	Member of the U.S. House of Representatives from Florida's 13th congressional district 2014–2017	Succeeded by Charlie Crist
Party political offices
Preceded by Charlie Crist	Democratic nominee for Governor of Florida; 2026	Most recent
U.S. order of precedence (ceremonial)
Preceded by Joe Garcia as Former U.S. Representative	Order of precedence of the United States as Former U.S. Representative	Succeeded by Curt Clawson as Former U.S. Representative
