= Harbor Bluffs, Florida =

- Census-designated place
- Location in Pinellas County and the state of Florida
- Coordinates: 27°54′29″N 82°49′37″W
- Country: United States
- State: Florida
- County: Pinellas

Area
  - Total: 0.95 sq mi (2.47 km^{2})
  - Land: 0.69 sq mi (1.79 km^{2})
  - Water: 0.26 sq mi (0.67 km^{2})
- Elevation: 20 ft (6.1 m)

Population (2020)
  - Total: 2,646
  - Density: 3,821/sq mi (1,475.2/km^{2})
- Time zone: UTC-5 (Eastern (EST))
  - Summer (DST): UTC-4 (EDT)
- ZIP code: 33770
- Area code: 727
- FIPS code: 12-28650
- GNIS feature ID: 2402564

Harbor Bluffs is a census-designated place (CDP) in Pinellas County, Florida, United States. As of the 2020 census, Harbor Bluffs had a population of 2,646.

== Geography ==
According to the United States Census Bureau, the CDP has a total area of 2.5 km^{2} (0.97 sq mi), of which 1.8 km^{2} (0.69 sq mi) is land and 0.7 km^{2} (0.27 sq mi) (27.37%) is water.

== Demographics ==
Historical population
Census	Pop.	Note	%±
1990	2,659		—
2000	2,807		5.6%
2010	2,860		1.9%
2020	2,646		−7.5%

=== 2020 census ===
As of the 2020 census, Harbor Bluffs had a population of 2,646. The median age was 55.1 years. 13.8% of residents were under the age of 18 and 28.4% of residents were 65 years of age or older. For every 100 females there were 96.4 males, and for every 100 females age 18 and over there were 96.3 males age 18 and over.

100.0% of residents lived in urban areas, while 0.0% lived in rural areas.

There were 1,159 households in Harbor Bluffs, of which 20.4% had children under the age of 18 living in them. Of all households, 62.6% were married-couple households, 13.5% were households with a male householder and no spouse or partner present, and 19.3% were households with a female householder and no spouse or partner present. About 22.4% of all households were made up of individuals and 13.2% had someone living alone who was 65 years of age or older.

There were 1,249 housing units, of which 7.2% were vacant. The homeowner vacancy rate was 2.4% and the rental vacancy rate was 4.1%.

Racial composition as of the 2020 census
Race	Number	Percent
White	2,384	90.1%
Black or African American	22	0.8%
American Indian and Alaska Native	2	0.1%
Asian	40	1.5%
Native Hawaiian and Other Pacific Islander	1	0.0%
Some other race	39	1.5%
Two or more races	158	6.0%
Hispanic or Latino (of any race)	137	5.2%

=== 2000 census ===
As of the 2000 census, there were 2,807 people, 1,186 households, and 876 families residing in the CDP. The population density was 1,548.3 people/km^{2} (4,010 people/mi^{2}). There were 1,251 housing units at an average density of 690.0 units/km^{2} (1,787 units/mi^{2}). The racial makeup of the CDP was 97.04% White, 0.11% African American, 0.04% Native American, 1.57% Asian, 0.25% from other races, and 1.00% from two or more races. Hispanic or Latino of any race were 1.96% of the population.

There were 1,186 households, out of which 25.7% had children under the age of 18 living with them, 66.4% were married couples living together, 5.6% had a female householder with no husband present, and 26.1% were non-families. 21.8% of all households were made up of individuals, and 13.2% had someone living alone who was 65 years of age or older. The average household size was 2.36 and the average family size was 2.76.

In the CDP, the population was spread out, with 19.3% under the age of 18, 3.6% from 18 to 24, 22.8% from 25 to 44, 30.7% from 45 to 64, and 23.6% who were 65 years of age or older. The median age was 47 years. For every 100 females, there were 93.1 males. For every 100 females age 18 and over, there were 91.1 males.

The median income for a household in the CDP was $61,397, and the median income for a family was $68,000. Males had a median income of $49,943 versus $30,900 for females. The per capita income for the CDP was $39,261. About 3.9% of families and 5.7% of the population were below the poverty line, including 8.9% of those under age 18 and 8.4% of those age 65 or over.
