= Bill Young (Florida politician) =

American politician (1930–2013)

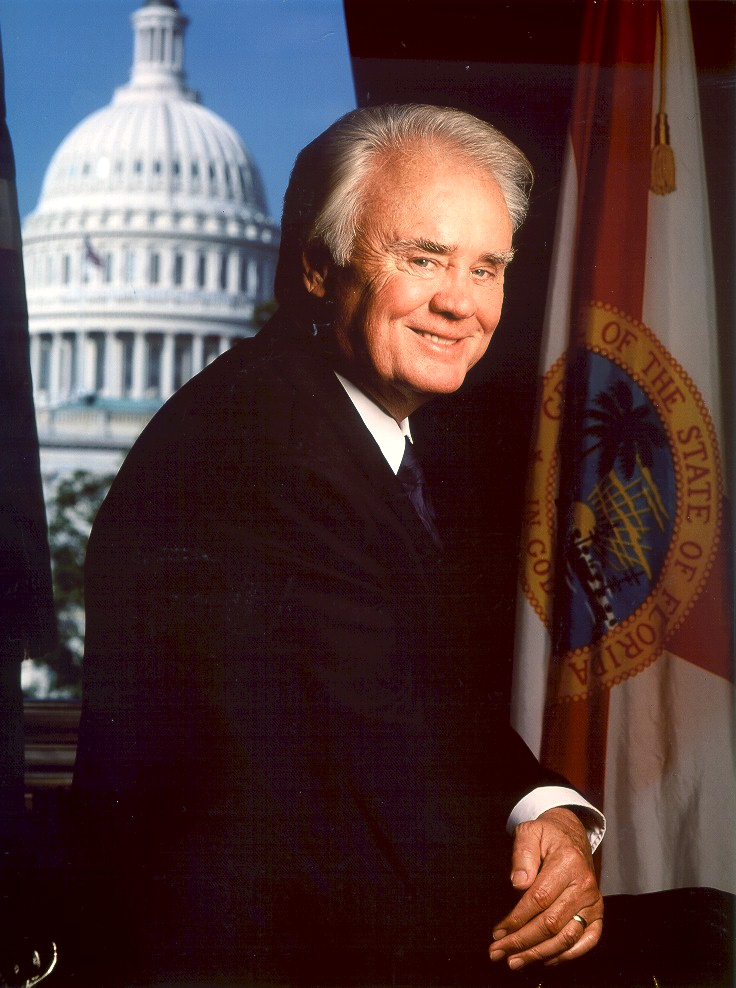

Chair of the House Appropriations Committee
- In office January 3, 1999 – January 3, 2005
- Preceded by: Bob Livingston
- Succeeded by: Jerry Lewis

Member of the U.S. House of Representatives from Florida
- In office January 3, 1971 – October 18, 2013
- Preceded by: William Cramer
- Succeeded by: David Jolly
- Constituency: 8th district (1971–1973); 6th district (1973–1983); 8th district (1983–1993); 10th district (1993–2013); 13th district (2013)

Member of the Florida Senate from the 19th district
- In office 1966–1970
- Preceded by: Beth Johnson
- Succeeded by: John Ware

Member of the Florida Senate from the 11th district
- In office 1961–1966
- Preceded by: J. Frank Houghton
- Succeeded by: William Stockton

Personal details
- Born: Charles William Young; December 16, 1930 Harmarville, Pennsylvania, U.S.
- Died: October 18, 2013 (aged 82) Bethesda, Maryland, U.S.
- Party: Republican
- Spouses: Marian Ford (m. 1949; div. 1985); Beverly Angello (m. 1985)
- Children: 5

Military service
- Branch: Army National Guard
- Service years: 1948–1957
- Rank: Master Sergeant
- Bill Young's voice Young, as chair of the House Appropriations Committee, discusses H.R.2559, the Military Construction Appropriations Act of 2004 and related appropriations bills Recorded June 26, 2003

Charles William Young (December 16, 1930 – October 18, 2013) was an American politician who served in the United States House of Representatives from 1971 until his death in 2013. A Republican from Florida, Young served as chairman of the House Committee on Appropriations from 1999 to 2005. He was the longest-serving Republican member of Congress at the time of his death.

== Early life, education, and early career ==
Young was born in Harmarville, Pennsylvania, a suburb of Pittsburgh, in 1930. He had Irish, German, and Swiss ancestry. He grew up in a Pennsylvania coal town in a shotgun shack. His father abandoned the family and a flood washed away their home at age 6. An uncle had a hunting camp in Florida, so the family moved there when he was 16. Young dropped out of St. Petersburg High School to support his ill mother, Wilma M. (Hulings) Young, and was wounded in a hunting accident. He married Marian Ford on August 20, 1949, when he was an 18-year-old high school dropout and she was 17, entering her senior year at St. Petersburg High School. When he was 18, he joined the Army National Guard and served from 1948 to 1957. After finishing his service, he applied for a job as an insurance salesman and ultimately ran an insurance agency.

== Florida Senate ==
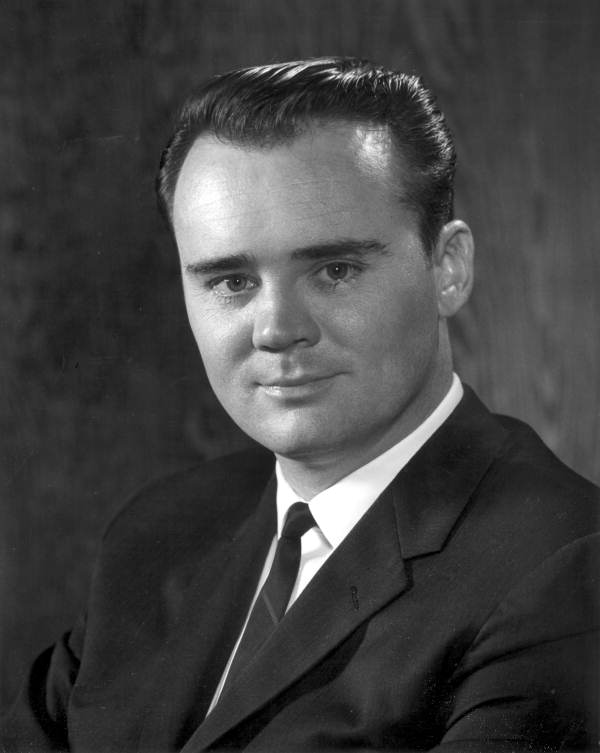
Young in 1968

In 1960 Young was elected to the Florida Senate, where he served from 1961 to 1970, and was minority leader in that chamber from 1966 to 1970. Until 1963, Young was the only Republican in Florida's upper chamber.

From 1962 through 1964, Young served on the Florida Legislative Investigation Committee, commonly known as the Johns Committee (for its Chairman Charley Eugene Johns), a legislative panel that investigated the activities of homosexuals, communists and others thought to be subversive. In 1964, the committee released a pamphlet entitled Homosexuality and Citizenship in Florida, which drew criticism at the time for its use of explicit photographs of homosexual acts. At the time, Young said of homosexuality: "Our report tried to show it in its true light – it's a very repulsive subject." Responding to reports that reprints of the pamphlet were being sold as pornography for a gay audience, Young said: "This indicates how bold the homosexual is becoming and further proves the necessity of state government taking the lead in responsibility for preventing these confirmed homosexuals from preying on the youth of the state." In 1993, Young was asked about his involvement with the report by the St. Petersburg Times and said: "I am not supportive of homosexuality, but that's the decision of the people who are involved in it. If someone wants to engage in that sort of behavior, that's their choice." Young also stated that the committee was largely inactive during his tenure due to the illness of its chair, Charley Eugene Johns, and that he was not involved enough in the committee to be either proud or regretful of its work.

== U.S. House of Representatives ==
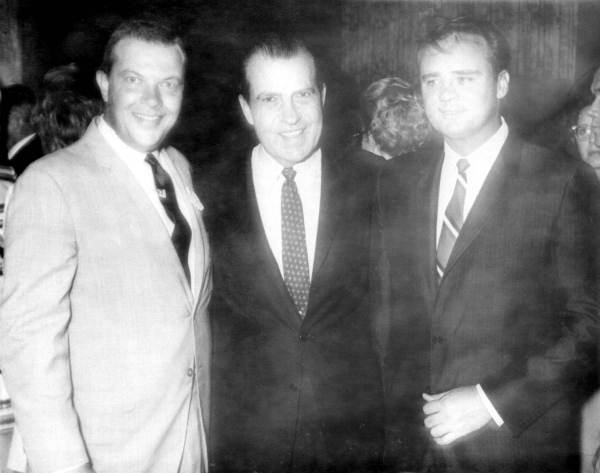
Young with Richard Nixon and Don Reed

=== Elections ===
Young was elected to Congress in 1970 from what was then the 8th District and was reelected 20 times. With the exception of his first term, he represented a district located almost entirely in Pinellas County. The district, which changed numbers four times during Young's tenure (it was the 8th District from 1971 to 1973, the 6th District from 1973 to 1983, the 8th District again from 1983 to 1993, the 10th from 1993 to 2013 and has been the 13th since 2013) was once considered a Republican stronghold; the St. Petersburg area had been one of the first parts of Florida to turn Republican. However, it has become much friendlier to Democratic candidates in recent years, at least on the national level. Since 1988, it has supported a Republican for president just two times, in 2004 and 2024. Despite the Democratic trend in his district at the national level, Young remained popular, and rarely faced serious opposition. He only twice received less than 60% of the vote, in 1992 and 2012.

=== Tenure ===
Young was a member of the Appropriations Committee for his entire time in Congress, and was able to use that seat to steer millions of federal dollars to his district. His earmarks have been used for U.S. Highway 19, high tech jobs, healthcare for children, clean water, and defense contractors. During his tenure he provided money to local agencies throughout the Tampa Bay area to build support throughout the region.

==== 1970s ====
In 1974, all four Republican congressmen from Florida said they would support impeaching President Richard Nixon over the Watergate Scandal.

In the 1976 Republican primary for president, Young endorsed President Gerald Ford over California Governor Ronald Reagan.

==== 1980s ====
In 1980, Young endorsed moderate George H. W. Bush over Ronald Reagan in the Republican primary.

Young opposed any spending cuts to the United States Coast Guard. He strongly opposed deficit reduction.

He was instrumental in creating a national registry for bone marrow donors in 1986. Now named after him, it lists nearly 10 million volunteer donors and has facilitated transplants for more than 50,000 people.

==== 1990s ====
After the 1994 Republican Revolution, House Speaker Newt Gingrich gave the position of chairman of the Appropriations Committee to Bob Livingston of Louisiana instead of Young, even though Young had more seniority. When Dennis Hastert became speaker in 1999, Young finally became the chairman.

Young strongly supported increases in defense spending and sent letters to Congressman John Kasich, Chairman of the Budget Committee, recommending an increase in DOD funding. Young strongly supported the F-22 Raptor.

In a 1999 The New York Times interview, Young stated, "In my short life I've been shot, I've been hit by a truck, survived an airplane crash, I've had my chest opened and my heart rebuilt. And it's sort of hard to get me flustered after all that."

==== 2000s ====
In 2005, Young received 3,570 earmark requests from members of Congress, because it was his last year as chairman of the committee. He believed that requests for earmarks should not be publicly disclosed. In March 2006, Young spokesman Harry Glenn said "This has been the policy of the committee for years. It's internal correspondence from one member to another." From 2007 to 2008, $167 million in earmarked funds came to the Tampa Bay Area.

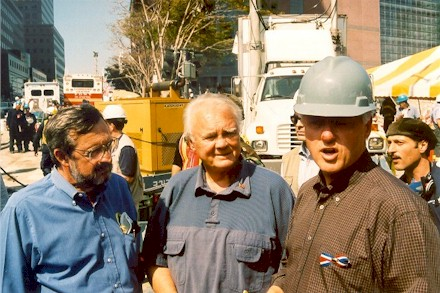
Bill Young with former President Bill Clinton and Representative Dave Obey in September 2001

At the State of the Union Address on January 31, 2006, authorities expressly prohibited the display of political ideology on clothing in the U.S. Capitol. Young's wife was asked to leave shortly after anti-war activist Cindy Sheehan was ejected for wearing an anti-war T-shirt. Beverly Young's T-shirt stated: "Support the Troops — Defending Our Freedom." She argued with Capitol Hill Police officers in the hallway outside the House chamber. "They said I was protesting," she told the St. Petersburg Times. "I said, 'Read my shirt, it is not a protest.' They said, 'We consider that a protest.' I said, 'Then you are an idiot.'" Young was angry about the way his wife was treated. "Because she had on a shirt that someone didn't like that said support our troops, she was kicked out of this gallery," Young said on the House floor the following day, holding up the gray shirt. "Shame, shame," he said. Capitol Police Chief Terrance Gainer apologized in a statement late that same day. Young said he was not necessarily satisfied. "My wife was humiliated," he told reporters. He suggested that "sensitivity training" might be in order for the Capitol Police.

On September 29, 2008, Young voted against the Emergency Economic Stabilization Act of 2008.

Young supported over $70 million in combined earmarks to two companies that employed his sons, both before and after they were employees. Young's son, Patrick, was hired by defense contractor SAIC when the company received earmarks requested by Young.

In 2009 Young signed a pledge sponsored by Americans for Prosperity promising to vote against any Global Warming legislation that would raise taxes.

In 2011, Young resisted a request by the Pentagon to transfer $863 million in funds from Humvee production to intelligence, surveillance and reconnaissance for the conflict in Afghanistan. AM General, which makes the Humvee, has been a contributor to Young's campaigns. Young denied that his actions "put American lives at risk", pointing to an urgent Marine Corps request to improve crew protection on existing Humvees as reason enough to preserve some funding for additional vehicles beyond armed forces requirements. Nonetheless, Young's committee approved $613 million of the Humvee funds to buy equipment for Afghanistan.

After eleven years of supporting the Afghanistan wars, Young turned against the war in 2012 after Army Staff Sgt. Matthew S. Sitton of Largo was killed in Afghanistan after sending Young a letter pointing out problems there and predicting his own death. Young's wife had also been trying to persuade her husband to oppose continued American involvement in Afghanistan. Young said "we're killing kids who don't need to die."

On October 9, 2013, Young announced he would not seek re-election in 2014.

=== Committee assignments ===
- Committee on Appropriations
  - Subcommittee on Defense (chairman)
  - Subcommittee on Military Construction, Veterans Affairs, and Related Agencies

Young received a term limit waiver to retain his chairmanship of the Appropriations Subcommittee for the 113th Congress. House Republicans limit committee chairmen to a six-year term, but Young received two consecutive waivers extending this limit.

=== Caucus memberships ===
- Army Caucus
- Congressional Diabetes Caucus
- Congressional Fire Services Caucus
- Congressional Human Rights Caucus
- Congressional Social Security Caucus (Co-chair)
- Congressional Travel and Tourism Caucus
- International Conservation Caucus
- Sportsmen's Caucus

== Electoral history ==
Florida's 8th congressional district: Results 1970
| Year | Republican | Votes | Pct | Democratic | Votes | Pct |
|---|---|---|---|---|---|---|
| 1970 | C. W. Bill Young | 120,466 | 67% | Ted Bailey | 58,904 | 33% |

Florida's 6th congressional district: Results 1972–1980
| Year | Republican | Votes | Pct | Democratic | Votes | Pct |
|---|---|---|---|---|---|---|
| 1972 | C. W. Bill Young | 156,150 | 76% | Michael O. Plunkett | 49,399 | 24% |
| 1974 | C. W. Bill Young (inc.) | 109,302 | 76% | Mickey Monrose | 34,886 | 24% |
| 1976 | C. W. Bill Young (inc.) | 151,371 | 65% | Gabriel Cazares | 80,821 | 35% |
| 1978 | C. W. Bill Young (inc.) | 150,694 | 79% | Jim Christison | 40,654 | 21% |
| 1980 | C. W. Bill Young (inc.) | Unopposed | 100% | | | |

Florida's 8th congressional district: Results 1982–1990
| Year | Republican | Votes | Pct | Democratic | Votes | Pct |
|---|---|---|---|---|---|---|
| 1982 | C. W. Bill Young | Unopposed | 100% | | | |
| 1984 | C. W. Bill Young (inc.) | 184,553 | 80% | Robert Kent | 45,393 | 20% |
| 1986 | C. W. Bill Young (inc.) | Unopposed | 100% | | | |
| 1988 | C. W. Bill Young (inc.) | 169,165 | 73% | C. Bette Wimbish | 62,539 | 27% |
| 1990 | C. W. Bill Young (inc.) | Unopposed | 100% | | | |

Florida's 10th congressional district: Results 1992–2010
| Year | Republican | Votes | Pct | Democratic | Votes | Pct | Third Party | Votes | Pct | Third Party | Votes | Pct |
|---|---|---|---|---|---|---|---|---|---|---|---|---|
| 1992 | C. W. Bill Young | 149,606 | 57% | Karen Moffitt | 114,809 | 43% | | | | | | |
| 1994 | C. W. Bill Young (inc.) | Unopposed | 100% | | | | | | | | | |
| 1996 | C. W. Bill Young (inc.) | 114,443 | 67% | Henry Green | 57,375 | 33% | | | | | | |
| 1998 | C. W. Bill Young (inc.) | Unopposed | 100% | | | | | | | | | |
| 2000 | C. W. Bill Young (inc.) | 146,799 | 76% | | | | Josette Green (Natural Law) | 26,908 | 14% | Randy Heine (independent) | 20,296 | 10% |
| 2002 | C. W. Bill Young (inc.) | Unopposed | 100% | | | | | | | | | |
| 2004 | C. W. Bill Young (inc.) | 207,175 | 69% | Robert D. Derry | 91,658 | 31% | | | | | | |
| 2006 | C. W. Bill Young (inc.) | 131,488 | 66% | Samm Simpson | 67,950 | 34% | | | | | | |
| 2008 | C. W. Bill Young (inc.) | 182,781 | 61% | Bob Hackworth | 118,430 | 39% | | | | | | |
| 2010 | C. W. Bill Young (inc.) | 137,943 | 66% | Charlie Justice | 71,313 | 34% | | | | | | |

Florida's 13th congressional district: Results 2012
| Year | Republican | Votes | Pct | Democratic | Votes | Pct |
|---|---|---|---|---|---|---|
| 2012 | C. W. Bill Young | 189,605 | 58% | Jessica Ehrlich | 139,742 | 42% |

== Other activities ==
Young served as a member of the Florida Constitution Revision Commission from 1965 to 1967. He was also a Florida delegate to the Republican National Convention in 1968, 1972, 1976, and 1984.

== Personal life ==
Young married Marian Ford on August 20, 1949, when he was an 18-year-old high school dropout and she was 17, entering her senior year at St. Petersburg High School. They had three children: Terry, Pamela, and Kimber. In 1985, after 36 years of marriage, Young divorced Marian. As part of the divorce agreement, Marian received $2,000 per month in alimony in exchange for agreeing to seal the divorce records and not speaking publicly about it during Young's lifetime. Eight days after the divorce became final, Young married Beverly Angello, who had worked as a secretary in his congressional office and was 25 years his junior. Young and Beverly had two children together: Charles William "Billy" (who was born in 1984, while Young was still married to Marian) and Patrick, in addition to Beverly's son, Robbie, from her first marriage.

On October 18, 2013, nine days after announcing his retirement, Young died at Walter Reed Hospital in Bethesda, Maryland at the age of 82. He had been hospitalized for almost two weeks after suffering a broken hip and fractured pelvis. Doctors could not perform hip surgery because of brittle bones caused by multiple myeloma, a blood cancer that forms in bone marrow.

On January 6, 2014, Marian Young and the three children from his first marriage spoke out for the first time since Young's death. Marian said that her lawyer had specifically asked her to keep silent about her husband's affair with Beverly due to concerns that he would lose his congressional seat. Even though the divorce records were sealed, many journalists at the time "knew about the affair and the [extramarital child's] birth, but believed such issues fell outside the public's right to know." Terry, Pamela and Kimber also claimed that they had only heard from their father sporadically in the three decades following the divorce.

== See also ==
- C. W. Bill Young Regional Reservoir
- List of members of the United States Congress who died in office (2000–present)#2010s

U.S. House of Representatives
| Preceded by William Cramer | Member of the U.S. House of Representatives from Florida's 8th congressional district 1971–1973 | Succeeded by James Haley |
| Preceded by Sam Gibbons | Member of the U.S. House of Representatives from Florida's 6th congressional district 1973–1983 | Succeeded by Buddy MacKay |
| Preceded by Andy Ireland | Member of the U.S. House of Representatives from Florida's 8th congressional district 1983–1993 | Succeeded by Bill McCollum |
| Preceded by Andy Ireland | Member of the U.S. House of Representatives from Florida's 10th congressional district 1993–2013 | Succeeded by Daniel Webster |
| Preceded by Bob Livingston | Chair of the House Appropriations Committee; 1999–2005 | Succeeded by Jerry Lewis |
| Preceded by Vern Buchanan | Member of the U.S. House of Representatives from Florida's 13th congressional district 2013 | Succeeded by David Jolly |
Honorary titles
| Preceded by Phil Crane | Most senior Republican in the U.S. House of Representatives; 2005–2013 | Succeeded by Don Young |
