= Donna Clarke =

American politician (born 1946)

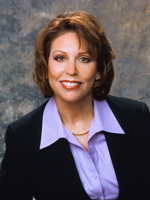

Member of the Florida House of Representatives from the 69th district
- In office November 7, 2000 – November 7, 2006
- Preceded by: Shirley Brown
- Succeeded by: Keith Fitzgerald

Personal details
- Born: July 27, 1946 (age 80) Fort Myers, Florida
- Party: Republican
- Spouse: Guy Azar
- Children: 1
- Education: University of Miami (B.Ed.); Georgia Institute of Technology (M.S.)
- Occupation: Commercial real estate, environmental consultant

Donna Clarke (born July 27, 1946) is a Republican politician from Florida who served as a member of the Florida House of Representatives from the 69th district from 2000 to 2006.

== Early life ==
Clarke was born in Fort Myers, Florida, in 1946. Her family moved to Miami when she was 12, and she attended the University of Miami, graduating with a degree in math education. After teaching in Miami-Dade County schools for two years, she attended the Georgia Institute of Technology, receiving her master's degree in industrial management. In 1989, she moved back to Fort Myers, where she worked as a real estate agent and then established an environmental permitting business, and moved to Sarasota in 1996.

== Florida House of Representatives ==
In 1998, when Republican State Representative Lisa Carlton ran for the Florida Senate, Clarke ran to succeed her in the 70th district. She won 21 percent of the vote, tying for third place with Brian O'Connell, and was defeated by Nancy Detert, who ultimately won the general election.

When Democratic State Representative Shirley Brown was term-limited in 2000, Clarke ran to replace her in the 69th district. She faced pharmacist Howard Chambers, real estate appraiser Joe Gruters, and former Sarasota police chief John Lewis in the Republican primary. Clarke placed first in the primary election, winning 33 percent of the vote, and advanced to a runoff election with Lewis, who placed second with 28 percent. She narrowly defeated Lewis, winning 52 percent of the vote, and advanced to the general election, where she was opposed by Democrat David Cullen, a variety show performer and producer. Clarke defeated Cullen by a thin margin, receiving 52 percent of the vote to his 48 percent.

In 2002, Clarke ran for re-election to a second term.She was challenged in the Republican primary by Cheryl Ennis, a legislative aide to State Representative Mark Flanagan. She defeated Ennis by a wide margin, winning renomination with 65 percent of the vote. In the general election, she was opposed by consultant Ken Sheila, the Democratic nominee, and Libertarian Bill Van Allen Jr. Clarke won re-election with 57 percent of the vote.

Clarke ran for re-election in 2004. She was challenged in the primary by attorney Steve Ellis, and defeated him by a wide margin, receiving 69 percent of the vote. She faced only Libertarian Bill Van Allen in the general election, and won in a landslide, receiving 73 percent of the vote.

== 2006 campaign for Congress ==
In 2005, Clarke announced that she would run for Congress from the 13th district in 2006, seeking to succeed Republican Congresswoman Katherine Harris, who was running for Senate. She faced fellow State Representative Nancy Detert, former State Representative Mark Flanagan, automobile dealer Vern Buchanan, and banker Tramm Hudson in the Republican primary. Buchanan ultimately won the primary, receiving 32 percent of the vote, while Clarke placed last with 9 percent.

== 2008 Sarasota County Tax Collector campaign ==
After leaving the legislature, Clarke announced that she would challenge Sarasota County Tax Collector Barbara Ford-Coates for re-election. Ford-Coates, a Democrat, won her seventh term over Clarke by a wide margin, receiving 67 percent of the vote to Clarke's 33 percent.

== Lee Memorial Health System Board ==
In 2014, Clarke, who moved to Lee County, ran for a seat on the Lee Memorial Health System Board of Directors from the 2nd district, which included east Cape Coral and Fort Myers. She was elected to a four-year term in 2014, and re-elected in 2018 and 2022.
