= Nancy Detert =

American politician (1944–2023)

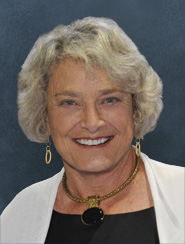

Member of the Sarasota County Commission from the 3rd district
- In office November 22, 2016 – April 5, 2023
- Preceded by: Christine Robinson
- Succeeded by: Neil Rainford

Member of the Florida Senate
- In office November 4, 2008 – November 8, 2016
- Preceded by: Lisa Carlton
- Succeeded by: Greg Steube
- Constituency: 23rd district (2008–2012); 28th district (2012–2016)

Member of the Florida House of Representatives from the 70th district
- In office November 3, 1998 – November 7, 2006
- Preceded by: Lisa Carlton
- Succeeded by: Doug Holder

Personal details
- Born: October 22, 1944 Chicago, Illinois, U.S.
- Died: April 5, 2023 (aged 78) Sarasota, Florida, U.S.
- Party: Republican
- Education: Siena Heights University
- Profession: Mortgage broker

Nancy C. Detert (October 22, 1944 – April 5, 2023) was an American mortgage company founder and Republican politician in Florida who represented parts of Sarasota County and Charlotte County in the Florida Senate from 2008 to 2016 after serving four terms in the Florida House of Representatives from 1998 to 2006. At the end of her career she was a Sarasota County commissioner from 2016 until her death.

== History ==
Detert was born in Chicago, Illinois, in 1944 and attended Siena Heights University, though she did not graduate. She moved to Florida in 1978. She is a descendant of Charles Carroll of Carrollton, the only Catholic signer of the Declaration of Independence.

In 1983, Detert founded the Osprey Mortgage Company, where she worked as the President until 2007. She was elected to the Sarasota County School Board, serving as a member until 1992, when she was defeated for re-election by Caroline Zucker.

== Florida House of Representatives ==
In 1998, when incumbent State Representative Lisa Carlton retired from her seat to run for the Florida Senate, Detert ran to succeed her in the 70th District, which was based in Venice, where she lived. She was opposed in the Republican primary by Rick Louis, Brian O'Connell, and Donna Clarke, and though she placed first with a plurality of 33%, she was forced to face second-place finisher Rick Louis in a runoff election. Detert campaigned as a moderate and on her experience, noting, "Rick and I make a very nice primary. There are three major differences--I have experience, he doesn't; I'm pro-choice, he's pro-life; on vouchers, he supports them, I oppose them."

Detert ended up defeating Louis by a wide margin, winning the nomination of her party with 59% of the vote to Louis's 41%. Advancing to the general election, she faced Alan Miller Kunerth, the Democratic nominee, and was endorsed by the Sarasota Classified Teachers Association, the AFL-CIO, and Associated Industries of Florida, and she said that the fact that she received endorsements from groups that regularly opposed each other "[demonstrated] her willingness to work with anybody in an effort to serve her potential constituents."

Ultimately, Kunerth did not pose a significant challenge to Detert, and she defeated him in a landslide, winning 70% of the vote to his 30%. Running for re-election in 2000, Detert faced Tim Wizba, the Democratic nominee, who did not campaign during the election due to child-care problems. She noted, however, that despite Wizba's inactivity, his candidacy pushed her to get to know her constituents better, saying, "I would have rather played golf. But since I had an opponent, I was invited to all of the candidate forums, which gave me a chance to speak to people, hear their concerns and give them a legislative update." Indeed, Wizba did not pose a significant challenge to her, and she defeated him in a landslide, winning re-election with 72% of the vote.

In 2002, Detert did not face a major party opponent and was opposed only by Sandy Primack, the Libertarian nominee and a software developer who lived in Volusia County. The Sarasota Herald-Tribune strongly endorsed her for re-election, noting that she "seems molded for the times" and "has been both an initiator of ideas and a compromiser on a broad array of issues." She ended up dispatching Primack with ease, scoring 82% of the vote to Primack's 18%. When she ran for re-election to her fourth and final term in 2004, she did not face major opposition once again, and defeated Libertarian nominee Don Wallace in a landslide, with 79% of the vote.

== 2006 congressional campaign ==
In 2006, when Detert could not seek another term in the legislature due to term limits, she instead opted to run for Congress in the 13th District, which was being vacated by Katherine Harris, who was running for the United States Senate instead of seeking re-election. Detert faced businessman Vern Buchanan, businessman Tramm Hudson, former State Representative Mark Flanagan and fellow State Representative Donna Clarke in the Republican primary, and she initially took a back seat in the election while Buchanan and Hudson attacked each other. Buchanan's largesse enabled him to donate more than $2 million to his campaign, more than any other congressional candidate during the cycle, with Detert sarcastically asking, "Wouldn't it have been cheaper just to pay us all to drop out?" As the campaign heated up, Buchanan took aim at Detert and mailed out an attack advertisement criticizing her for being "soft" on illegal immigration, though she condemned the advertisement as a distortion of her views. The Sarasota Herald-Tribune endorsed Detert over her opponents, saying, that she has a "solid record of effective, principled legislative experience" and "a political philosophy unencumbered by dogma." Ultimately, Detert fell to Buchanan, receiving 24% of the vote to his 32%. Following the contentious primary, Detert initially declined to publicly announce their support for Buchanan's campaign, but after some "soul searching" and pressure from then-Governor Jeb Bush, she decided to support his candidacy, although he was not her first choice, because she felt that Democrats regaining control of Congress would result in "total government gridlock."

== Florida Senate ==
When State Senator Lisa Carlton was unable to seek another term due to term limits, Detert ran to succeed her in the 23rd District, which included western Charlotte County, a small segment of Manatee County, and most of Sarasota County. She faced State Representative Michael J. Grant in the Republican primary, and received the endorsements of Carlton and State Senate President Ken Pruitt, while Grant was endorsed by then-Governor Charlie Crist and State Senator Mike Bennett. Detert campaigned on her experience and her knowledge of the district, observing, "I know Sarasota County, and I know state government. I know what Sarasota County residents care about, and I think I'm the best candidate to represent them." She also received the endorsement of the Herald-Tribune once again, which declared, "Detert is pragmatic. In the complicated world of the Legislature, she didn't look for glory or ideological victories. She went for moderate strategies that got things done. With that approach, she won multiple legislator-of-the-year awards and chaired important committees." Although she was outspent significantly by Grant, she was able to narrowly win the primary with 52% of the vote to Grant's 48%, remarking, "I get credit for time served and commitment to my community. That's the old-fashioned way."

Advancing to the general election, she was opposed by Morgan Bentley, the Democratic nominee and an attorney. The two embarked on a contentious and oftentimes vicious campaign, with the Republican Party of Florida running television advertisements attacking Bentley for representing insurance companies as an attorney, which Detert condemned, and the Florida Democratic Party and Bentley attacking Detert for voting for legislation that raised insurance rates by 70%. In the end, Detert ended up defeating Bentley by a wide margin, winning her first term in the Senate with 58% of the vote to Bentley's 42%.

When Florida Senate districts were redrawn in 2012, Detert opted to run for a second term in the 28th District, which included most of her previous district's territory. She was re-elected unopposed, both in the primary and the general election.

While serving in the Senate, Detert strongly opposed controversial legislation referred to as the "parent trigger" bill, whereby parents could "turn traditional public schools that are failing into charter schools," noting that she had "not heard from one parent who supports this bill." She sponsored legislation that would "allow children in foster care to remain in the system until they are 21," as there were instances in which high school students who had turned eighteen were left on their own. Detert also sponsored legislation that would ban texting while driving, but allowed it when drivers were in stationary cars, and was further weakened by the House of Representatives to say that "law enforcement could not look at a driver's cellphone to seek evidence of texting unless there was an accident with injuries or death."

== Sarasota County Commission ==
In 2016, Detert was term-limited in the Senate and decided to run for an open Sarasota County Commission seat. She was elected without opposition.

== Death ==
Detert died on April 5, 2023, at the age of 78.
