= Peggy Simone =

American politician

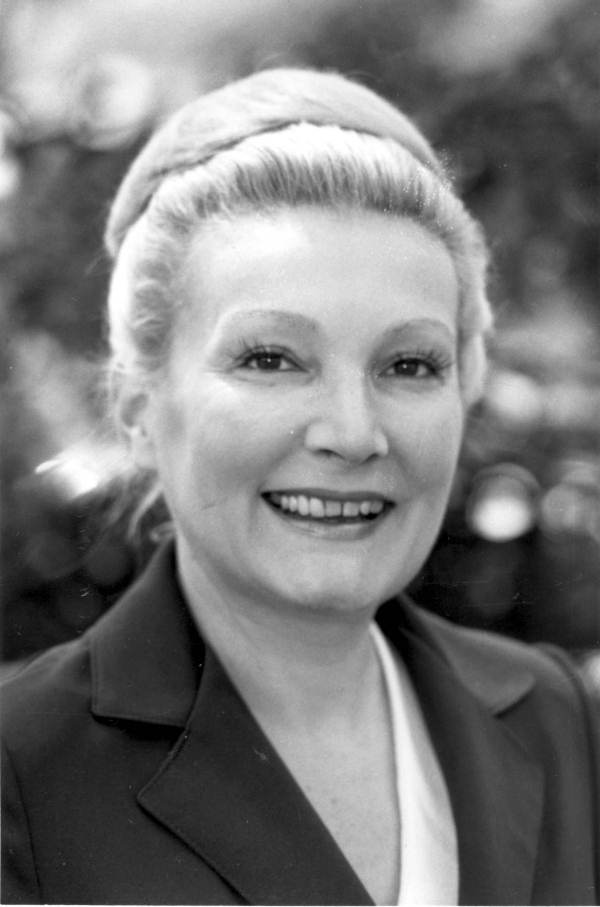
- Simone in 1984

Member of the Florida House of Representatives from the 68th district
- In office 1982–1992
- Preceded by: Richard Hodes
- Succeeded by: Julie McClure

Personal details
- Party: Republican
- Spouse: John Simone

Peggy Simone is an American politician from Bradenton, Florida, who served five terms in the Florida House of Representatives.

== Personal life ==
Simone is from Champaign, Illinois. She graduated from Rosary College in 1956 with a B.A. in economics. After graduating she worked for the federal government for year. Then she worked for a few magazines eventually becoming the editor of Better Homes and Gardens magazine for 3 years in the 1960s. From 1965 to 1975 she worked in real estate development with her husband John. In 1977 she retired with her husband to Bradenton, Florida, moving there from Topeka, Kansas.

== Political career ==
Simone started her political career in 1980 when she ran for election supervisor of Manatee County. She lost the election to incumbent H. Jerome Davis.

In 1982 Simone would run for the newly created house district 68 covering Bradenton, Florida. During this election she would be endorsed by The Bradenton Herald. However she would run in a tough primary race where she originally lost to Dave Wilcox but a runoff of triggered where Simone was able to win. After this she cruised to an over 15% victory and used a catchy song to help get voters out.

In 1984 she would cruise to a victory as the incumbent in the 68th district.

In 1986 she would she would draw criticism for comments made about stopping state funds from helping those with AIDS. However, she would still win reelection by 30%.

In 1988 Simone drew no democratic challengers so the race was declared a Republican Primary. Simone won reelection by almost 20%.

In 1990 Simone won reelection by 14%.

In 1992 Simone originally planned to run for reelection, however her husband had a surgery and she decided to forgo reelection.

== Electoral history ==
General election for Florida House of Representatives District 68, 1990
Party	Candidate	Votes	%
Republican	Peggy Simone	20,259	57.5%
Democratic	Jim Lacher	14,945	42.5%

Republican Primary for Florida House of Representatives District 68, 1988
Party	Candidate	Votes	%
Republican	Peggy Simone	6,250	58.4%
Republican	Dewey Eason	4,461	41.6%

General election for Florida House of Representatives District 68, 1986
Party	Candidate	Votes	%
Republican	Peggy Simone	22,660	65.5%
Democratic	Ron Specker	11,940	34.5%

General election for Florida House of Representatives District 68, 1984
Party	Candidate	Votes	%
Republican	Peggy Simone	26,509	65.2%
Democratic	Ernest Marshall	14,150	34.8%

General election for Florida House of Representatives District 68, 1982
Party	Candidate	Votes	%
Republican	Peggy Simone	16,118	58.1%
Democratic	L. H. "Bud" Fortson	11,608	41.9%

Runoff election Republican Primary for Florida House of Representatives District 68, 1982
Party	Candidate	Votes	%
Republican	Peggy Simone	2,513	57.9%
Republican	Dave Wilcox	1,828	42.1%

Republican Primary for Florida House of Representatives District 68, 1982
Party	Candidate	Votes	%
Republican	Dave Wilcox	2,861	43.4%
Republican	Peggy Simone	2,593	39.4%
Republican	Martin Goodson	1,133	17.2%

General election for Manatee County elections supervisor, 1980
Party	Candidate	Votes	%
Democratic	Peggy Simone	29,518	52.2%
Republican	Peggy Simone	27,058	47.8%
