= Fiona McFarland =

American politician (born 1985)

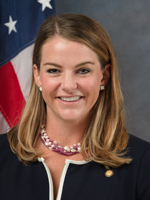

Member of the Florida House of Representatives
- Incumbent
- Assumed office November 4, 2020
- Preceded by: Margaret Good
- Constituency: 72nd district (2020–2022); 73rd district (2022–present)

Personal details
- Born: November 15, 1985 (age 40)
- Party: Republican
- Relatives: K. T. McFarland (mother)
- Education: United States Naval Academy (BS); University of North Carolina, Chapel Hill (MBA)
- Website: State House website

Military service
- Allegiance: United States
- Branch/service: United States Navy
- Years of service: 2008–2016 (Active); 2016–present (Reserve)

Fiona Fuller McFarland (born 1985) is an American U.S. Navy reservist and a state legislator in Florida. She currently serves in the Florida House of Representatives representing the 73rd district, which covers parts of Sarasota. She is a member of the Republican Party. McFarland is the daughter of former White House Deputy National Security Advisor KT McFarland.

Originally elected to the House of Representatives in November 2020, and reelected again in 2022, McFarland has served on a number of committees. Currently, she is the chair of the Transportation & Modals Subcommittee and is a representative of the Infrastructure Strategies Committee, Civil Justice Subcommittee, Energy, Communications & Cybersecurity Subcommittee, and the Regulatory Reform & Economic Development Subcommittee.

McFarland is married to fellow Naval Academy classmate and native Floridian Matthew Melton. They have three children.

== Military service and political career ==
McFarland is a 2008 graduate of the United States Naval Academy, where she majored in Political Science and was captain of the varsity women’s rowing team. She served for eight years in the navy on active duty as a Surface Warfare officer, completing tours of duty onboard the Arleigh Burke Class Guided Missile Destroyer USS Preble (DDG 88), as an inaugural crewmember on the Littoral Combat Ship USS Coronado (LCS 4) and in the Navy Office of Information in the Pentagon. While on active duty, she earned an MBA from the University of Chapel Hill’s Kenan Flagler Business School in 2013.

In 2016, McFarland joined the US Navy Reserves, where she participated in multinational antisubmarine warfare exercises above the Arctic Circle with the US European Command, as well as with the US Africa Command.

In her civilian capacity, McFarland worked as a consultant with the global business management consulting firm McKinsey and Company, where she served clients across media, consumer goods, manufacturing, and advanced technology industries, among others, consulting directly with senior executives of Fortune 500 to solve business and operations challenges.

In June 2019, McFarland announced that she would be running to unseat the incumbent Democratic representative Margaret Good in the 72nd district of the Florida House of Representative. However, in July 2019, Good announced that she would be running to unseat Vern Buchanan in the race for Florida's 16th congressional district. During the Republican primary, McFarland faced local hospital board member Donna Barcomb and attorney Jason Miller. McFarland widely outspent both primary opponents and narrowly won the primary by 1.2 points (263 votes). She defeated attorney Drake Buckman in the general election.

In April 2023, McFarland sponsored an influential data privacy bill in the House, Senate Bill 262, dubbed the "Digital Bill of Rights." After years of debate about the issue and a failed attempt in 2021, Florida lawmakers passed the wide-ranging legislation, in which companies must allow Florida consumers to opt out having sensitive data collected, giving individuals more control over data gathered by Big Tech companies. Signed by Florida Governor Ron DeSantis, the bill also gives consumers the right to confirm, access, delete, correct and obtain a copy of their data, and they can opt out of "the processing of personal data for the purposes of targeted advertising, the sale of personal data, or profiling in furtherance of a decision that produces a legal or similarly significant effect concerning a consumer," according to a Senate bill analysis.
