= NBCC =

NBCC may stand for:

- National Black Catholic Congress
- National Board for Certified Counselors
- National Building Code of Canada
- New Brunswick Community College
- National Black Chamber of Commerce
- National Book Critics Circle
- National Breast Cancer Coalition
- NBCC (India) Limited (National Buildings Construction Corporation), Govt. of India
- Nagaland Baptist Church Council
- Nutty Blocc Compton Crips
