= Nick Pachota =

American politician

Member of the Florida House of Representatives from the 74th district
- Incumbent
- Assumed office November 3, 2026
- Preceded by: James Buchanan

Personal details
- Party: Republican
- Website: Campaign website

Nick Pachota is an American politician. A member of the Republican Party, he has served in the Florida House of Representatives since 2026, representing the 74th district. He succeeded fellow Republican James Buchanan in the 2026 election. He was the mayor of Venice, Florida.
