= David Thomas (Florida politician) =

American politician (born 1945)

Member of the Florida House of Representatives
- In office November 6, 1984 – November 8, 1994
- Preceded by: Fred Burrall
- Succeeded by: Lisa Carlton
- Constituency: 71st district (1984–1992); 70th district (1992–1994)

Personal details
- Born: October 13, 1945 (age 80) Philadelphia, Pennsylvania
- Party: Republican
- Spouse: Christina
- Children: 5
- Education: University of Miami (A.B., M.D.)
- Occupation: Physician, attorney

David Lamarr "Dave" Thomas (born October 13, 1945) is a Republican politician from Florida who served as a member of the Florida House of Representatives from 1984 to 1994.

== Early life ==
Thomas was born in Philadelphia in 1945, and moved to Florida in 1951. He attended the University of Miami, receiving his bachelor's degree in 1963 and his medical degree in 1970. Thomas practiced as an ophthalmologist in Sarasota.

== Florida House of Representatives ==
In 1982, following redistricting, Thomas ran against incumbent State Representative Fred Burrall in the Republican primary in the redrawn 71st district. Thomas argued that Burrall was ineffective in the legislature, saying, "There is no record to attack," because he had authored so little legislation. Thomas lost to Burrall, receiving 40 percent of the vote to Burrall's 60 percent.

Burrall declined to seek another term in 1984, and Thomas ran to succeed him. In the Republican primary, he faced real estate agent Ted Baszto, former Charlotte County Sheriff Jack Bent, and developer Scott Confer. Thomas placed first in the primary, winning 42 percent of the vote, and he proceeded to a runoff election with Confer, who placed second with 25 percent of the vote. The race between Thomas and Confer was close, and on election night, Confer led Thomas by 66 votes. Following a recount, Thomas defeated Confer by 8 votes. In the general election, he was opposed by businessman Claude Robbins, the Democratic nominee. Thomas defeated Robbins in a landslide, winning 71 percent of the vote.

Thomas was re-elected unopposed in 1986 and 1988.

In 1990, Thomas ran for a fourth term, and was challenged by former North Port City Commissioner Esther Kramer, the Democratic nominee. He defeated Kramer, winning 59 percent of the vote.

When Congressman Andy Ireland announced that he would not seek re-election, Thomas ran to succeed him in the renumbered 13th district. In a crowded primary, Thomas placed third, winning 20 percent of the vote, while businessmen Brad Baker and Dan Miller placed first and second, respectively, with 28 percent.

However, State Representative Jim Lombard, who won the Republican nomination unopposed in the neighboring 70th district, abruptly ended his campaign after the primary and urged the state Republican Party to pick Thomas as his replacement on the ballot. The Sarasota County Republican Party objected to Thomas as the replacement, and instead endorsed Lisa Carlton, an attorney and former aide to Lombard. However, the state party's executive committee voted by a 25-5 margin to name Thomas as the Republican nominee, angering local Republicans. In the general election, Thomas faced attorney Martin Rosen, the Democratic nominee. Despite the party's overwhelming voter registration edge, Thomas only won re-election with 56 percent of the vote.

In 1994, Carlton challenged Thomas for the nomination. Though the candidates largely agreed on the issues, Carlton argued that she knew the district better than Thomas. Carlton defeated Thomas in the primary by a wide margin, winning 60 percent of the vote to his 40 percent.
