= Bill Galvano =

American politician

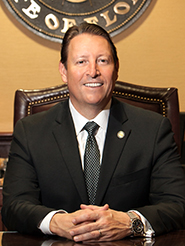

President of the Florida Senate
- In office November 20, 2018 – November 17, 2020
- Preceded by: Joe Negron
- Succeeded by: Wilton Simpson

Majority Leader of the Florida Senate
- In office November 18, 2014 – November 29, 2016
- Preceded by: Lizbeth Benacquisto
- Succeeded by: Wilton Simpson

Member of the Florida Senate
- In office November 6, 2012 – November 3, 2020
- Preceded by: Redistricted
- Succeeded by: Jim Boyd
- Constituency: 26th district (2012–2016); 21st district (2016–2020)

Member of the Florida House of Representatives from the 68th district
- In office November 5, 2002 – November 2, 2010
- Preceded by: Mark Flanagan
- Succeeded by: Jim Boyd

Personal details
- Born: William Saint Galvano; April 16, 1966 (age 60) Liberty, New York, U.S.
- Party: Republican
- Spouse: Julie Forrester
- Children: 3
- Education: Manatee Community College (AA); University of Florida (BA); University of Miami (JD)

William Saint Galvano (born April 16, 1966) is an American Republican politician from Florida. He represented Manatee County and part of Hillsborough County in the Florida Senate from 2012 to 2020 and in the Florida House of Representatives from 2002 to 2010. He served as President of the Senate in his last two years in office.

== History ==
Galvano was born in Liberty, New York, and moved to the state of Florida in 1969, where he was a student at Sebring High School. He then attended Manatee Community College, where he received his associate degree in 1986, and then the University of Florida, graduated with his bachelor's degree in political science in 1989. Following graduation, Galvano attended the University of Miami School of Law, and was awarded his Juris Doctor in 1992. After working in private practice for several years as an associate attorney, he became a partner at Grimes Hawkins Gladfelter & Galvano, a law firm in Bradenton.

== Florida House of Representatives ==
In 2002, when incumbent State Representative Mark Flanagan was unable to seek re-election due to term limits, Galvano ran to succeed him in the 68th District, which was based in western Manatee County and included a small segment of southern Hillsborough County. He faced Brian Murphy, an optometrist; Benjamin Milks, a Cedar Hammock Fire Control District Commissioner; and David Miner, an attorney, in the Republican primary. Galvano campaigned on his support for providing a clean-up fund to deal with the fallout from phosphate mining operations attracting more federal dollars to the state, reforming the state's charter school program by requiring a "parental contribution" for families who use vouchers, strengthening corporate fraud laws, enacting a clear air policy statewide, and providing "community-based care" for children in foster care. Although the Sarasota Herald-Tribune praised Galvano's candidacy as "appealing on several key issues", including his "keener interest in environmental protection" and growth management, they ultimately endorsed Murphy, citing his "greater breadth of leadership experience." Ultimately, however, Galvano defeated his opponents by a fairly wide margin, winning 46% of the vote to Murphy's 31%, Milks' 13%, and Miner's 10%. He advanced to the general election, where he was opposed by Arlene Sweeting, the Democratic nominee, and James Wallace, the Libertarian nominee. During the general election, he attacked Sweeting's platform, noting, "She wants to do a lot of things for everybody. The question is: Where will the money come from?" He called for the implementation of zero-based budgeting in light of the state's revenue shortfalls. The Herald-Tribune endorsed Galvano in the general election, noting that, despite the fact that both candidates are "thoughtful, well-versed on the issues, and deeply involved in their community," Galvano's "more practical, fiscally conservative approach" would help create a "moderate, bipartisan consensus in Tallahassee." Owing to the conservative nature of the district, Galvano won his first term in a landslide, defeating Sweeting and Wallace with 62% of the vote.

He was re-elected without opposition in 2004, 2006, and 2008. In his final term in the Florida House, from 2008 to 2010, Galvano served as chairman of the House Rules and Calendar Committee, "the most influential House position held by a Bradenton or Sarasota legislator in the past 25 years" at the time, and as the chairman of the House Select Committee on Seminole Indian Compact Review, where he "served as one of the influential architects in negotiating and developing the compact."

Throughout his tenure in the Florida House, Galvano also "held statewide hearings on child abuse, led on expansion of state child health insurance programs for the poor and helped overhaul the state's Agency for People with Disabilities."

When he was unable to seek a fifth term in 2010 due to term limits, he was succeeded by Jim Boyd.

== Florida Senate ==
When the state's legislative districts were redrawn, Galvano opted to run in the newly created 26th District, which included the district that he previously represented in the House. He was unopposed in the Republican primary and advanced to the general election, where he faced the Democratic nominee, Paula House, an attorney. Galvano campaigned on a platform of lowering the corporate tax rate and eventually phasing it out, supporting the state's charter school system, and connecting the coast with light rail, while House criticized Galvano for siding with special interests. Galvano was endorsed by The Bradenton Herald, the Tampa Bay Times, and the Tampa Tribune, with the Herald praising the "depth of his legislative and leadership experience, the strength of his commitment to public service and his principled approach to issues," the Times noting his "better grasp of the region," and the Tribune citing his "reputation as a reasonable, thoughtful lawmaker." He ended up defeating House by a solid margin, winning his first term in the Senate with 59% of the vote to her 41%.

He was re-elected to his second term in 2014 without opposition, and was named the Senate Majority Leader for the 2014-2016 Senate term. Additionally, in anticipation of his re-election in 2018, Galvano circulated pledge cards from Senators in an effort to be elected President of the Florida Senate that year.

Galvano's district was reconfigured and renumbered after court-ordered redistricting in 2016.

During his tenure in the Florida Senate, Galvano focused on education, chairing and serving on education-related committees, where he was "deeply involved in education policy" and "worked to increased statewide funding for both higher education and K-12 schools." He also oversaw the creation of new school voucher program, the Family Empowerment Scholarship for Educational Options, during his presidency.

Two of Galvano's top priorities as senate president were improving the state's transportation infrastructure and addressing red tide. To address the current and future infrastructure needs of the state, Galvano "proposed the development of three multi-use corridors in west and north Florida, including the extension of both the Florida Turnpike and the Suncoast Parkway" with the addition of a new corridor from Polk County to Collier County to "spur job growth in rural areas, relieve congestion on Interstates 75 and 4, and provide hurricane evacuation routes." In response to a red tide bloom in 2018, he also championed a bill to allocate $18 million over six years to the Mote Marine Laboratory in Sarasota, Florida, to develop technologies that can fight red tide blooms.

Along with Governor Rick Scott and Representative Jose Oliva, in 2018 Galvano pushed for the passage of Florida's most restrictive gun control in 20 years in response to the Marjory Stoneman Douglas mass shooting that took place in Parkland, Florida, on February 14, 2018. Galvano spearheaded the legislation, "sketching out the school safety bill at his kitchen table after being horrified by what he saw when he toured the school following the shooting that left 17 dead." The bill was a "comprehensive approach to addressing the issues presented by the tragedy at Marjory Stoneman Douglas High School in Parkland, Florida, including firearm and school safety, and community mental health resources."

In 2018, Galvano's Political Action Committee received a large donation from the Michael Bloomberg-funded gun control advocacy group Everytown for Gun Safety. Senator Galvano "has said repeatedly he would not apologize for accepting the funds and that he was grateful for the support from Bloomberg". Since receiving this large monetary contribution from the Bloomberg affiliated groups, Senator Galvano pushed for tougher gun control measures.

In 2020, he opened the last session of his term as president of the Florida Senate.

Galvano was term-limited in 2020 and was again succeeded by Jim Boyd.

== New College of Florida ==
In early 2023, Galvano replaced David Smolker as General Counsel of New College of Florida. The decision was part of a general restructuring by the college's newly-appointed Board of Trustees at their first business meeting after the appointment of several new members by Governor Ron DeSantis, at which the board also fired college president Patricia Okker, resolved to appoint former Florida House Speaker Richard Corcoran as interim president, and named a new board chair.

== Philanthropy ==
Through the Annual Phil Galvano Golf Classic, first held in 1996, Galvano has raised more than $10 million for public schools to provide enhanced educational opportunities for students and teachers. Funds raised specifically benefit the Manatee Education Foundation to help Manatee County public schools and fund items, programs or events that aren't typically covered under public education funding from the state.

The event honors Galvano's late father, Phil Galvano, a golf coach to celebrities, including Bob Hope, Johnny Carson and Carol Burnett, author of two best-selling books, and host of his own golf TV show, named by Golf Digest as one of 18 people who had the greatest influence on the golf game.

== Acknowledgements ==
The Bill Galvano One Stop Center, which houses Turning Points, a non-profit serving the community's homeless, was named in honor of the work Galvano has done to secure funding for such missions.

In 2020, Manatee County designated a section of 44th Avenue as the Honorable State Senate President Bill Galvano Parkway. While serving in the Florida Senate, Galvano helped secure $20 million in state funds to expand the roadway.

In 2023, Galvano was awarded the G. Kirk Haas Humanitarian Award from the Florida Bar in recognition of his public service. Established in 1998, the award recipient selects a Florida law school, and a scholarship is awarded to a student who demonstrates an exceptionally high degree of integrity, ethics, professionalism, and a concern for others.

Florida Senate
Preceded by Lizbeth Benacquisto	Majority Leader of the Florida Senate; 2014–2016	Succeeded by Wilton Simpson
Political offices
Preceded by Joe Negron	President of the Florida Senate; 2018–2020	Succeeded by Wilton Simpson
