= Doug Holder =

American politician

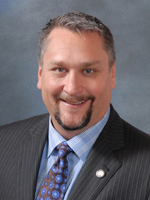

Member of the Florida House of Representatives
- In office November 7, 2006 – November 4, 2014
- Preceded by: Nancy Detert
- Succeeded by: Julio Gonzalez
- Constituency: 70th district (2006–2012); 74th district (2012–2014)

Personal details
- Born: December 7, 1966 (age 59) Marietta, Georgia, U.S.
- Party: Republican
- Education: Middle Tennessee State University (B.S.)
- Profession: Small businessman

Doug Holder (born December 7, 1966) is a Republican politician who served as a member of the Florida House of Representatives from 2006 to 2014, representing the 70th District from 2006 to 2012, and the 74th District, which included Englewood, North Port, and Venice in Sarasota County, from 2012 to 2014. He was a candidate for the Florida Senate in 2018 but lost in the Republican primary.

== History ==
Holder attended Middle Tennessee State University, where he received a degree in political science in 1990. While in college, he served as student body president and was the student ambassador for George H. W. Bush when he visited the campus. Holder moved to the state of Florida in 1997.

== Florida House of Representatives ==
When incumbent State Representative Nancy C. Detert was unable to seek re-election in 2006 due to term limits, Holder ran in the Republican primary to succeed her in the 70th District, which included most of western Sarasota County, stretching from Englewood to Siesta Key, and faced Rory Dubin, Jon Kleiber, and Elizabeth Cuevas-Neunder. He spent nearly $400,000 of his own money on advertising, leading some people to accuse Holder of "trying to buy the office and of ignorance of local issues." Holder emerged victorious in the Republican primary, winning 42% of the vote, and moved on to the general election, where he engaged in a contentious campaign with the Democratic nominee, attorney David Shapiro. Though Holder and Shapiro pledged to run positive campaigns, a group supporting Holder, People for a Better Florida Fund, which received a sizable donation from Holder's stepmother, attacked Shapiro for being a "millionaire trial lawyer" and for opposing tort reform. Holder narrowly won over Shapiro, winning 51% of the vote to Shapiro's 49%, with a margin of just 756 votes. In 2008, retired dentist Sam Rosenfeld received the Democratic nomination to challenge Holder's bid for re-election. Although Democrats were hopeful that Rosenfeld could defeat Holder, given the closeness of his initial election, Holder easily defeated his opponent, winning re-election with 61% of the vote. When Holder ran for re-election in 2010, his Democratic opponent, Nancy Feehan, attacked him over his vote "to allow the governor and cabinet to permit drilling from 3 to 10 miles from shore," which had particular resonance given the Deepwater Horizon oil spill. This led Holder to change his position on offshore oil drilling. Holder managed to repeat his 2008 victory, defeating Feehan with 61% of the vote.

In 2012, when the legislative districts were reconfigured, Holder was moved to the 74th District, which included most of the territory that he previously represented in Sarasota County from the 70th District. He did not face any opponents and won his final term in the legislature unopposed.

== Florida Senate ==
In 2013, Holder announced that he would run to succeed State Senator Nancy Detert in the 28th District, which includes western Charlotte County and Sarasota County, in 2018, when Detert will be term-limited. Acknowledging that it is unusual to file to run for a position nearly six years in advance of the election, Holder noted, "If I have competition, it's good for me to get going early."

== Diplomatic Career ==
On June 1, 2026, Holder was nominated by Donald Trump to be the US ambassador to Bulgaria.
