= Julie McClure =

American politician (born 1944)

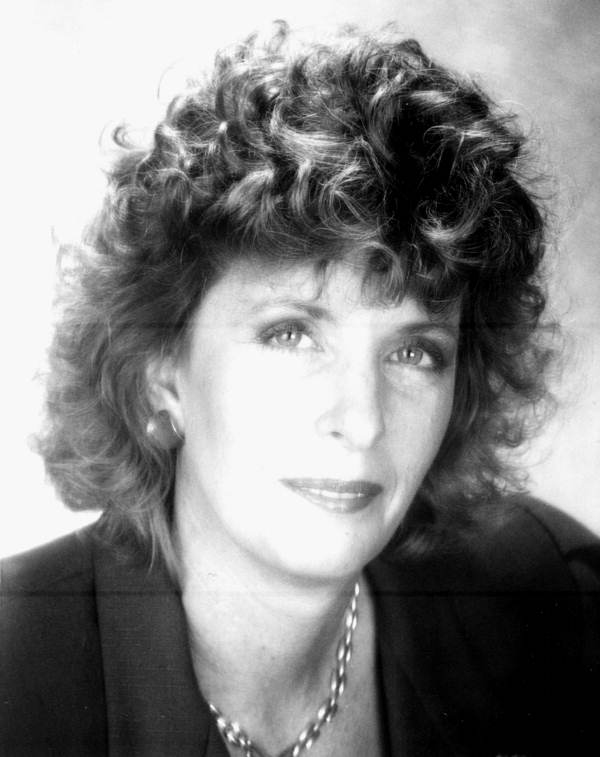

Member of the Florida House of Representatives from the 68th district
- In office November 3, 1992 – November 8, 1994
- Preceded by: Peggy Simone
- Succeeded by: Mark Flanagan

Personal details
- Born: November 24, 1944 (age 81) Atlanta, Georgia
- Party: Democratic (until 1994); Republican (1994–present)
- Children: 2
- Education: Southern Methodist University (B.A.)
- Occupation: Property appraiser

Julie McClure (born November 24, 1944) is an American politician from Florida who served as a member of the Florida House of Representatives from the 68th district from 1992 to 1994. Originally a Democrat, she switched to the Republican Party in 1994.

== Personal life ==
McClure is a graduate of Southern Methodist University. She is also a longtime resident of Bradenton, Florida, where she owns a small business named Julie McClure Inc. - Appraisals and Sales.

== Political career ==
McClure's political career started in 1992 when she ran for the 68th district in the Florida House of Representatives. During this race she was endorsed by The Bradenton Herald for her specific policy agenda. In the end she won the race by only 0.6% barley beating out Brian Adams.

In April 1994 McClure pushed for a bill that would require children under the age of 16 to wear helmets while riding bikes. She was successful with her efforts in the house where it passed 60–46. and two years later in 1996 the law would go into effect.

In 1994 she would run as the incumbent for the Florida House's 68th district. She ended up losing the election by 2% to Mark Flanagan. Shortly after this she would switch to the Republican Party.

In 1996 she planned to challenge for her seat back, however she was diagnosed with breast cancer and decided not to run.

== Electoral history ==
General election for Florida House of Representatives District 68, 1994
Party	Candidate	Votes	%
Republican	Mark Flanagan	21,519	51.3%
Democratic	Julie McClure	20,437	48.7%

General election for Florida House of Representatives District 68, 1992
Party	Candidate	Votes	%
Democratic	Julie McClure	26,066	50.3%
Republican	Brian Adams	25,718	49.7%
