= Richard Hodes =

American politician

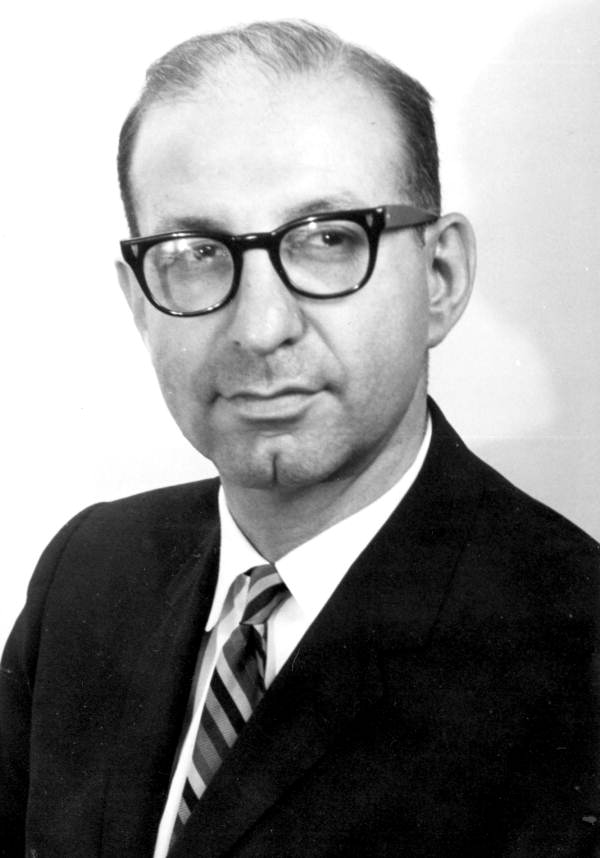
- Hodes in 1966

Member of the Florida House of Representatives from the 68th district
- In office March 1967 – 1982
- Preceded by: District established
- Succeeded by: Peggy Simone

President of the National Conference of State Legislatures
- In office 1980–1981
- Preceded by: George B. Roberts Jr.
- Succeeded by: Ross Doyen

Personal details
- Born: April 24, 1924 New York, U.S.
- Died: January 28, 2002 (aged 77)
- Party: Democratic
- Spouse: Marjorie C. Hodes
- Children: 1
- Education: Tulane University

Richard S. Hodes (April 24, 1924 – January 18, 2002) was an American politician. He served as a Democratic member for the 68th district of the Florida House of Representatives.

Hodes was born in New York, and moved to Florida in 1935. He attended Tulane University, where he earned a Bachelor of Science degree in 1944. Hodes practised as a physician, and was also a television presenter. In 1967

Hodes was elected as a member for the newly established 68th district of the Florida House of Representatives, serving until 1982. He was honored with the Florida Jaycees Good Government Award in 1970, and was also nominated as the St. Petersburg Times's Most Valuable Member of the House at least four times. He was the chairman of the Florida House of Representatives Health and Rehabilitation Services Committee.

Hodes died in January 2002, at the age of 77.
