= Michael Owen (Florida politician) =

American politician (born 1975)

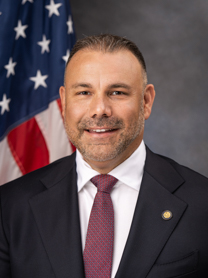

Member of the Florida House of Representatives from the 70th district
- Incumbent
- Assumed office November 5, 2024
- Preceded by: Mike Beltran

Personal details
- Born: December 23, 1975 (age 50) Houston, Texas, U.S.
- Party: Republican
- Education: Saint Leo University (BA); Western Michigan University (JD)
- Website: Campaign website

Michael Owen (born December 23, 1975) is an American politician and attorney who is currently serving as a Republican member of the Florida House of Representatives, representing the 70th district. He was first elected in 2024, defeating Democratic nominee Luther Wilkins with 67% of the vote. The district is based in Hillsborough and Manatee counties. He previously served as the commissioner for District 4 of the Hillsborough County Commission.

== Personal life and career ==
Owen was born on December 23, 1975 in Houston, Texas, and moved to Florida in 1976, being raised in Brandon. He is Christian. He maintains a law practice specializing in real estate.

== Political views ==
=== Minimum wage ===
Owen publicly opposed Amendment 2 in 2020, which intended to gradually raise the minimum wage in Florida to $15 by 2026. He stated that he would not be opposed to increasing the minimum wage in the future, but believed it was unwise at the time.

=== Term limits ===
Owen proposed a bill in February 2025 that would create a constitutional referendum to limit members of the Florida Senate to two four-year terms and the Florida House of Representatives to four two-year terms.
