= Lawrence McClure =

American politician

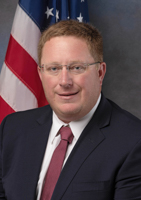

Member of the Florida House of Representatives
- Incumbent
- Assumed office December 19th, 2017
- Preceded by: Dan Raulerson
- Constituency: 58th district (2017–2022); 68th district (2022–present)

Personal details
- Born: June 26, 1987 (age 39) Tampa, Florida, U.S.
- Party: Republican
- Spouse: Courtney McClure

Lawrence McClure (June 26, 1987) is an American businessman and politician who is a member of the Florida House of Representatives. He was elected in a special election in December 2017. He represents the Plant City area.

He succeeded Dan Raulerson.

In 2022, he sponsored a bill that would have ended net metering and allowed Florida electric utilities to impose steep bills on those who install solar panels on their buildings. The proposed legislation was vetoed by Governor Ron DeSantis. McClure subsequently said he intended to propose a revised version of the bill.

In 2022, McClure switched districts and ran in the 68th. He won his primary by over 30%.
