= Mike Beltran =

American politician from Florida

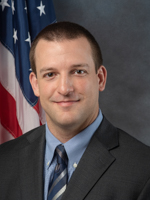
- Official portrait, 2018

Member of the Florida House of Representatives from the 70th district
- In office November 6, 2018 – November 5, 2024
- Preceded by: Jake Raburn
- Succeeded by: Michael Owen

Personal details
- Born: Michael Paul Beltran; June 26, 1984 (age 42) New York City, New York, U.S.
- Party: Republican
- Education: University of Pennsylvania (BA); Harvard University (JD)
- Website: Campaign website

Michael Paul Beltran (born June 26, 1984) is an American attorney and politician who served in the Florida House of Representatives, representing the 70th district, which includes part of Hillsborough County. He was the Republican nominee in the 2026 election in Florida's 14th congressional district.

== Education and legal career ==
Beltran was born in New York City. He earned a B.A. from the University of Pennsylvania in 2005 and a J.D. from Harvard Law School in 2008. He practiced law in the Tampa Bay area before entering politics.

== Political career ==
=== Florida House of Representatives ===
Beltran served three terms in the Florida House of Representatives, representing District 70 from November 2018 to November 2024.

During his time in the Florida House of Representatives, Beltran sponsored bills to permit graduating high school students to wear the uniform of the United States Armed Forces at commencement ceremonies, to establish restrictions on minors vaping in indoor public spaces and within 1,000 feet of schools, and to allow parents to anonymously and safely surrender infants to hospital staff via a safe-haven law.

He also sponsored an unsuccessful amendment to allow the open carrying of firearms in Florida, as well as a bill banning abortion except when necessary to save the life of a pregnant minor in a medical emergency.

=== 2026 U.S. House election ===
On August 18, 2026, Beltran won the crowded Republican primary election in Florida's 14th congressional district. Beltran advanced to the November 3, 2026, general election to face Democratic incumbent Kathy Castor. Beltran received 45.6% of the vote, while Kevin Steele came in second place with 30.2%. The remaining six candidates each received less than 10% of the vote.

== Political positions ==
Beltran calls himself "MAGA Mike". During his three terms in the Florida House, he had a fiscally conservative record and opposed abortion. He has supported Donald Trump for president since 2015 and received endorsements from pro-life and school-choice organizations during his 2026 congressional campaign.

== Personal life ==
Beltran and his wife, Hope, have two sons.
