= Dan Raulerson =

American politician

Daniel D. "Dan" Raulerson
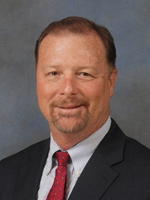

Member of the Florida House of Representatives from the 58th district
- In office November 20, 2012 – August 15, 2017
- Preceded by: Janet Cruz
- Succeeded by: Lawrence McClure

Personal details
- Born: July 3, 1957 (age 69) Jacksonville, Florida
- Party: Republican
- Spouse: Shirley Drake
- Children: Jaclyn, Alek
- Education: Florida State University (BS)
- Profession: Accountant

Dan Raulerson (born July 3, 1957) is a former Republican politician from Florida. He served in the Florida House of Representatives from 2012 until his resignation in 2017. He represented the 58th District, including northeastern Hillsborough County.

== Background ==
Raulerson was born in Jacksonville, and attended Florida State University, where he graduated with a degree in accounting in 1979. He then moved to Orlando, where he worked for an accounting firm, and then moved to Plant City, where first managed a new branch that his firm was opening there, but later started Raulerson & Company, which is an accounting firm and consulting enterprise. In 2007, Raulerson was elected to serve as a City Commissioner in Plant City, and was elected by the Commission to serve as Mayor.

== Florida House of Representatives ==
In 2012, following the reconfiguration of the Florida House of Representatives districts, Raulerson ran in the newly created 58th District, and won the nomination of the Republican Party unopposed. He faced Jose Vazquez, the Democratic nominee, in the general election. Raulerson campaigned on improving the efficiency of government, identifying his top priorities in the legislature as "Streamlining statutes, eliminating wasteful spending and making government more accountable for its performance." The Tampa Bay Times strongly endorsed Raulerson, calling him "the only credible choice," largely because Vazquez's plan "is a mishmash of incoherent ideas." The Tampa Tribune also endorsed Raulerson, noting that "[h]e knows how to handle a budget and how to wring efficiencies out of an operation," while his opponent "has a checkered past that includes arrests, hardly an appropriate resume for public office." He defeated Vazquez by a solid margin, winning 57% of the vote. Raulerson was re-elected to his second term in the legislature in 2014 without opposition.

Raulerson resigned from the House effective August 15, 2017, due to chronic health issues.
