= Julio Gonzalez (Florida politician) =

American politician (born 1964)

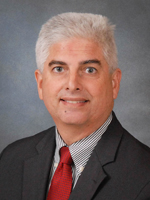

Member of the Florida House of Representatives from the 74th district
- In office November 4, 2014 – November 6, 2018
- Preceded by: Doug Holder
- Succeeded by: James Buchanan

Personal details
- Born: May 30, 1964 (age 62) Miami, Florida, U.S.
- Party: Republican
- Spouse: Gina Arabitg
- Children: Monica Gonzalez, Jessica Gonzalez
- Education: University of Miami (MD); Stetson University (JD)
- Profession: Orthopedic surgeon

Military service
- Allegiance: United States
- Branch/service: United States Navy Reserve
- Years of service: 1992-1995
- Unit: Medical Corps

Julio Gonzalez (born May 30, 1964) is an American politician and a former member of the Florida House of Representatives, representing the 74th District, which includes Englewood, North Port, and Venice in Sarasota County, from 2014 to 2018. In 2018, Gonzalez lost the Republican primary for Florida's 17th congressional district by a large margin.

== Early life and education ==
Gonzalez was born in Miami, Florida, and attended Belen Jesuit Preparatory School, where he graduated in 1982. He then attended the Miller School of Medicine at the University of Miami, where he received his Doctor of Medicine in 1990.

== Early career ==
After graduation, Gonzalez completed an internship in internal medicine at the Naval Medical Center Portsmouth, and then joined the United States Navy Reserve as a medical officer from 1992 to 1995. He moved to Jacksonville, where he completed orthopaedic surgery training at UF Health Jacksonville, and then to Orlando, where he practiced knee reconstructive and shoulder surgery. In 2004, Gonzalez moved to Venice, and began working at the Venice Regional Medical Center, eventually becoming the Chief of Surgery, Chief of Staff, and the representative to the board of trustees.

== Florida House of Representatives ==
In 2014, incumbent State Representative Doug Holder was unable to seek re-election due to term limits, so Gonzalez ran to succeed him. He faced attorney Richard DeNapoli in the Republican primary, and a brutal campaign ensued. Gonzalez attacked DeNapoli over allegations that he lived outside the district and over his past support of former Governor Charlie Crist, while Gonzalez was attacked for campaign contributions that he made to Congresswoman Debbie Wasserman Schultz, also the Chairwoman of the Democratic National Committee. Gonzalez asserted that he made the contributions in order to meet with Wasserman Schultz to discuss his opposition to the Patient Protection and Affordable Care Act, but Gonzalez had made the contributions in 2008, and the legislation was not proposed until 2009.

Groups supporting DeNapoli also aired advertisements attacking Gonzalez over a book that he wrote in 2009 called "Health Care Reform — The Truth," in which Gonzalez called for the "creation of health index scores for patients who need medical care," and that, "Once the patient reaches that health index score, government and insurance funding designed to cure major illnesses such as cancer should be discontinued. For the sake of the patient, his loved ones and our economy, efforts should be redirected from curative to supportive." The advertisements claimed that Gonzalez was advocating for death panels "worse than those in Obamacare," but Gonzalez "said he was only pointing out the problem that patients now can be put through prolonged, painful treatments when there is not chance of medicine helping them."

Gonzalez campaigned on his opposition to the Common Core standards, to the expansion of Medicaid under the Patient Protection and Affordable Care Act, and to legislation that would allow "undocumented immigrants who graduate from Florida high schools to get in-state college tuition rates," and was endorsed by United States Senator Marco Rubio, who praised Gonzalez for "living the American Dream." Gonzalez ended up defeating DeNapoi by a wide margin, receiving 57% of the vote, and he advanced to the general election. He faced only write-in opposition and won with nearly 100% of the vote.

In February 2017, The Florida Bar published an article opposing a bill sponsored by Gonzalez that allows the legislature to overrule a supreme court decision with a two-thirds vote.
