= National Black Chamber of Commerce =

American nonprofit organization

The National Black Chamber of Commerce (NBCC) was incorporated as The National Black Chamber of Commerce, Inc., in 1993. It is a nonprofit, nonpartisan, nonsectarian organization dedicated to the economic empowerment of African American communities. Additionally, the organization indicates that it represents the views of its members regarding economic and political policy issues; domestically and internationally. It is organized as a 501(c) corporation and has at least 190 chapters within the United States. The NBCC also has international chapters in the Bahamas, Brazil, Colombia, Ghana and Jamaica. As with all Chambers of Commerce, affiliate branches are committed to carrying out the goals of the main Chamber within their areas.

However, the organization is largely funded by non-African American businesses on behalf of whose interests it often lobbies, such as the fossil fuel, telecommunications, and tobacco industries, and has sometimes been accused of being a front group.

== Origin ==
The NBCC is a very young national organization when compared to others such as the NAACP and the Congress on Racial Equality (CORE). NBCC was founded in 1993 by Harry C. Alford and his wife Kay DeBow. Alford, who serves as the first President and CEO, is also a board member of the United States Chamber of Commerce. In an interview reported in Human Events, Mr. Alford identifies with the Booker T. Washington approach to African American self empowerment and sees the approach of W.E.B. Du Bois and the NAACP (whom he calls enemies of Washington) as primarily political.

== Mission ==
The stated mission of the NBCC is to "economically empower and sustain African American communities through entrepreneurship and capitalistic activity within the United States and via interaction with the Black Diaspora". It claims to be the first major African American organization to focus on economic empowerment.

=== Funding ===
The NBCC "is funded primarily by fossil fuel energy companies, including Koch Industries and ExxonMobil," according to a 2015 analysis by the Florida Center for Investigative Reporting. ExxonMobil includes the NBCC on its 2004 list of contributions and community investments. From 2002 through 2014 NBCC received $1 million, and from 2008 through 2015 $800,000, from Exxon Mobil. In June 2015 Peabody Energy contributed $10,000 to the NBCC. Other fossil fuel companies that have funded NBCC include the Gulf Power Company division of the Southern Company and Chevron. The NBCC acknowledges funding from fossil fuel companies.

NBCC has also received funding from and lobbied on behalf of the tobacco industry. Tobacco company Altria was scheduled to sponsor the 2004 Fall Summit meeting in Negril, Jamaica. It had previously received funding from Altria's predecessor Philip Morris Companies Inc and from the R. J. Reynolds Tobacco Company, and facilitated marketing access to its members. In March 2011, Alford appeared before a U. S. Food and Drug Administration advisory panel to oppose proposed restrictions on menthol cigarettes, which are used disproportionately by African Americans. In doing so, he sided with Lorillard, whose major product was mentholated Newport cigarettes, and which had been an NBCC member since 2008, paying $35,000 in dues annually.

NBCC has also received funding from and lobbied on behalf of the telecommunications industry. Verizon was listed as a funder of NBCC, which has in turn lobbied the Federal Communications Commission (FCC) against net neutrality and other telecommunications industry regulations. NBCC also voiced support for a proposed merger between AT&T and T-Mobile.

Hewlett-Packard sponsored the 2003 Annual convention in Birmingham, Alabama. Lord Abbett and New York Life participated with the NBCC in the sponsorship of the Building Wealth Tour. The American Chemistry Council has also funded NBCC.

In 2015, Florida Congressman Alcee Hastings urged NBCC to cut ties with industry groups that spread misinformation on air pollution.

== Positions ==
The NBCC "has been a staunch ally of utility and fossil fuel companies for nearly a quarter century," according to the Florida Center for Investigative Reporting.

- In 1998, Alford testified before the United States Congress that the Kyoto Protocol would harm minority-owned small businesses.
- In testimony submitted to the Senate Committee on Health, Education, Labor, and Pensions regarding Senate Bill S.625, the NBCC stated that it opposes increased the U.S. Food and Drug Administration (FDA) regulation of tobacco. The reason for its opposition is that the regulation would impose fees affecting small tobacco retailing and distribution businesses in the U.S., many of which are owned by Black Americans.
- In public comments regarding the Microsoft antitrust case, the NBCC along with the Telecommunications Research and Action Center and the National Native American Chamber of Commerce indicated that the case settlement was inadequate in terms of consumer protection and that additional remedies were required.
- The NBCC denies the scientific consensus on climate change, stating on their website that "...there is no sound science to support the claims of Global Warming." In 2009, NBCC opposed the American Clean Energy and Security Act, a proposed emissions trading plan.
- The NBCC supports the Keystone XL Pipeline.
- In 2015 the NBCC opposed the Environmental Protection Agency's Clean Power Plan. In June 2015 NBCC released a report entitled Potential Impact of Proposed EPA Regulations on Low Income Groups and Minorities; the Union of Concerned Scientists said the report "relies on misleading claims cut-and-pasted from several previously debunked reports." Seven newspapers published op-eds from the NBCC saying that the Plan will impose "economic hardship" on blacks and Hispanics; none of the newspapers disclosed NBCC's funding from the Exxon Mobil Foundation.
