= Fred Burrall =

American politician

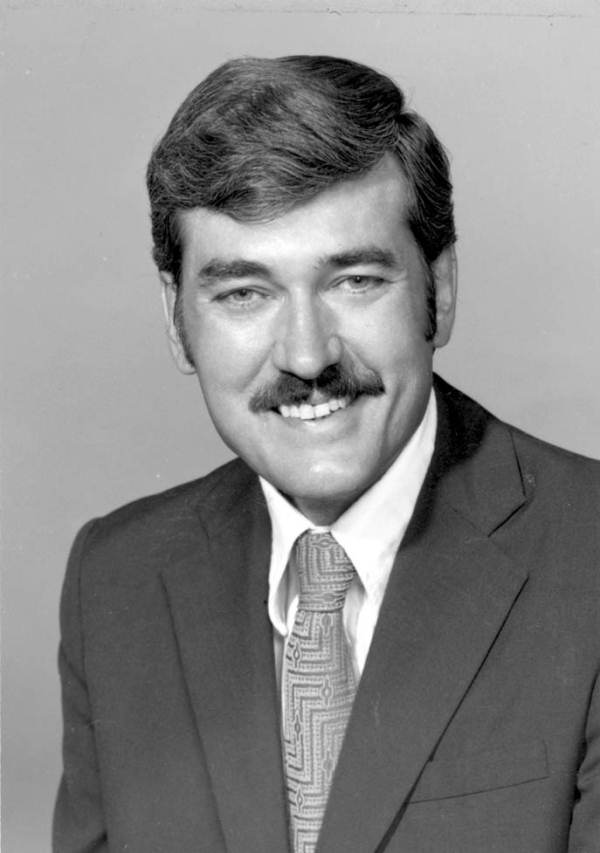

Member of the Florida House of Representatives
- In office November 5, 1974 – November 6, 1984
- Preceded by: Jim K. Tillman
- Succeeded by: David Thomas
- Constituency: 75th district (1974–1982); 71st district (1982–1984)

Personal details
- Born: Frederic Hoberg Burrall; September 19, 1935 Green Bay, Wisconsin
- Died: October 27, 2016 (aged 81) Marietta, Georgia, U.S.
- Party: Republican
- Spouse: Bette Stewart Burrall
- Children: Christina Nadine Burrall-Thompson, Julianna Burrall
- Occupation: Park Ranger, real estate, Editor Port Charlotte Tribune and columnist of Charlie Says, Journalist, Veteran USAF

Frederic H. "Fred" Burrall (September 19, 1935 – October 27, 2016) was an American politician in the state of Florida.

Burrall was born in Green Bay, Wisconsin and attended the University of Wisconsin–Madison, Florida State University, and the University of Florida, where he received a BS in journalism in 1961. He was a veteran of USAF, journalist, newspaper editor, real estate agent, park ranger. He served in the Florida House of Representatives for the 71st district from 1974 to 1984, as a Republican.

Burrall died on October 27, 2016,
