= Ray Pilon =

American politician

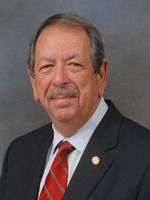

Member of the Florida House of Representatives
- In office November 2, 2010 – November 8, 2016
- Preceded by: Keith Fitzgerald
- Succeeded by: Alexandra Miller
- Constituency: 69th district (2010–2012); 72nd district (2012–2016)

Personal details
- Born: January 11, 1945 (age 81) Pontiac, Michigan
- Party: Republican
- Spouse: Kathleen "Casey" Pilon
- Children: Sean, Chad
- Education: Northern Michigan University (B.S.)
- Profession: Law enforcement officer

Ray Pilon (born January 11, 1945) is a former Republican member of the Florida House of Representatives, representing the 72nd District, which includes northern Sarasota County, from 2012 to 2016, and the 69th district from 2010 to 2012. Pilon unsuccessfully ran for the Republican nomination for Florida Senate District 23 in 2016, placing 4th, and was his party's unsuccessful nominee for his former seat in 2018, losing to Margaret Good.

== History ==
Pilon was born in Pontiac, Michigan, and attended Northern Michigan University in Marquette, Michigan, graduating with a Bachelor's degree in 1968. After graduation, he moved to the state of Florida in 1979, where he began working as a police officer. In 1996, Pilon was elected to the Sarasota County Commission, where he served until 2000.

== Florida House of Representatives ==
In 2010, when incumbent Democratic State Representative Keith Fitzgerald ran for a third term in the House, Pilon returned from political retirement to challenge him in the 69th District, which included a few precincts in southern Manatee County and northwestern Sarasota County. Pilon emerged victorious over Fitzgerald, narrowly defeating his opponent with 52% of the vote and by a 1,380 vote margin of victory.

When Florida House districts were redrawn in 2012, Pilon opted to run for re-election in the 72nd District, which included most of the territory that he had previously represented in the 69th District. He was opposed by Liz Alpert, the Democratic nominee and an attorney who had previously run for the state legislature fourteen years prior. During the course of the campaign, "Alpert tried to tie Pilon to Governor Rick Scott and paint him as too conservative for the district." Ultimately, Pilon was re-elected over Alpert, winning 54% of the vote.

While in the legislature, Pilon broke from his party to oppose a ban on abortion that was sought based on the sex or race of the child, noting, "I'm a very strong conservative Republican. I believe in personal responsibility," but that the legislation unfairly burdened physicians and got into areas that "perhaps we shouldn't be delving in."

During the 2016 Legislative Session, Pilon voted in favor of the NRA-backed pro-gun bill HB 169.
