= Shirley Brown (politician) =

American politician (born 1952)

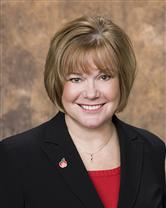

Member of the Sarasota County School Board from the 4th district
- In office November 21, 2006 – November 22, 2022
- Preceded by: Laura Benson
- Succeeded by: Robyn Marinelli

Member of the Florida House of Representatives from the 69th district
- In office November 3, 1992 – November 7, 2000
- Preceded by: Harry Jennings
- Succeeded by: Donna Clarke

Personal details
- Born: October 2, 1952 (age 73) Oshkosh, Wisconsin
- Party: Democratic
- Spouse: Jack Brown
- Children: 2 (Angela, Jack)
- Education: Southern Illinois University
- Occupation: Collection agency owner

Shirley Ann Brown (born October 2, 1952) is a Democratic politician from Florida who served as a member of the Florida House of Representatives from the 69th district from 1992 to 2000 and as a member of the Sarasota County School Board from 2006 to 2022.

== Early life ==
Brown was born in Oshkosh, Wisconsin, in 1952, and moved to Sarasota, Florida in 1982. She and her husband established Certified Credit Systems, a credit and collections agency, and she founded the Sarasota Newcomers Club, a social organization for new residents.

== Florida House of Representatives ==
In 1990, Brown was recruited by the Florida Democratic Party to run for the Florida House of Representatives from the 69th district, and challenged incumbent Republican State Representative Harry Jennings. She won the Democratic nomination unopposed, and campaigned on her support for abortion rights, health care reform, and environmental protection. Brown narrowly lost to Jennings, winning 48 percent of the vote to his 52 percent.

Brown challenged Jennings again in 1992, but Jennings declined to seek re-election, and Jerry Ellis, a banker, won the Republican nomination to succeed him. Brown defeated Jennings by a wide margin, receiving 58 percent of the vote to his 42 percent, flipping the seat.

In 1994, Brown ran for re-election and was challenged by Stan Smith, a former spokesman for the Republican Party of Florida. She narrowly defeated him, receiving 53 percent of the vote to his 47 percent.

Brown ran for a third term in 1996, and was initially challenged by Marilyn Lee, a member of the Sarasota County Public Hospital Board. But after Lee withdrew from the race, state insurance worker Gregg Grunstein emerged as the Republican nominee. Brown defeated Grunstein by a wide margin, receiving 60 percent of the vote to his 40 percent.

In 1998, Brown was challenged by Joe Gruters, a 20-year-old Florida State University student. She defeated Gruters, receiving 60 percent of the vote.

== 2000 campaign for Supervisor of Elections ==
Brown was term-limited in 2000, and ran for Sarasota County Supervisor of Elections. She was defeated by Republican Kathy Dent, a law office manager, who won 56 percent of the vote to Brown's 44 percent.

== Sarasota County School Board ==
In 2006, Brown ran for a seat on the Sarasota County School Board from the 4th district. She was elected to succeed Laura Benson, who retired to run for the state legislature, defeating Carol Williams, a teacher, with 64 percent of the vote. She was re-elected unopposed in 2010.

Brown was challenged in 2014 by Helen Wolff, who campaigned against the adoption of the Common Core educational standards. Though the race was formally nonpartisan, Wolff was a Republican who ran with the support of local Tea Party groups. Brown ultimately defeated Wolff by a wide margin, winning 66 percent of the vote to Wolff's 34 percent.

In 2018, Brown attracted controversy for allegedly telling Superintendent Todd Bowden during contract negotiations that he and the teachers' union executive director "needed to get laid, but that would be sexual harassment," which he criticized as "offensive" and "inappropriate." She ran for re-election, and was challenged by Karen Rose, a former school administrator who was endorsed by the local teachers' union. Brown narrowly defeated Rose, winning 50.4 percent of the vote.

Brown declined to run for re-election in 2022.
