= Florida's 74th House of Representatives district =

Florida district

Florida's 74th State House of Representatives district
Representative
James Buchanan; R–Osprey

Florida's 74th House of Representatives district elects one member of the Florida House of Representatives. It contains parts of Sarasota County.

== Members ==
- Doug Holder (2012–2014)
- Julio Gonzalez (2014–2018)
- James Buchanan (2018–2026)
- Nick Pachota (since 2026)
