= Keith Fitzgerald =

American politician

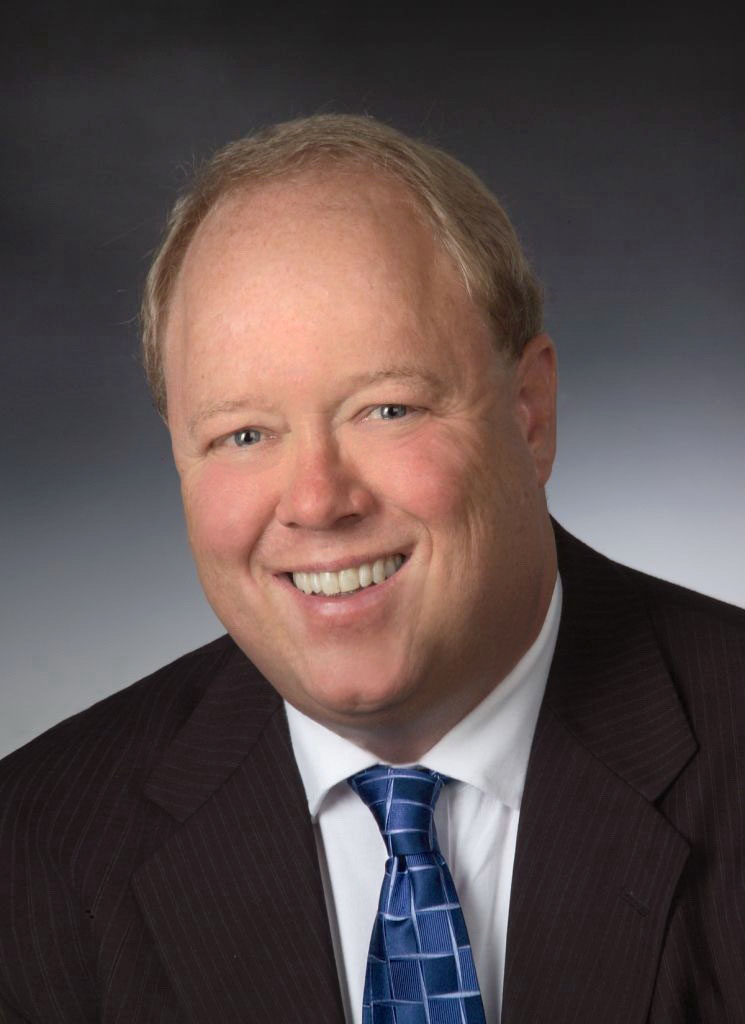

Member of the Florida House of Representatives from the 69th district
- In office November 7, 2006 – November 2, 2010
- Preceded by: Donna Clarke
- Succeeded by: Ray Pilon

Personal details
- Born: November 30, 1956 (age 69) Springfield, Ohio
- Party: Democratic
- Spouse: Angela Baker
- Education: University of Louisville (BA); Indiana University Bloomington (PhD)
- Occupation: Political scientist

Keith Fitzgerald (born November 30, 1956) is a former Democratic member of the Florida House of Representatives, representing the 69th District for two terms from 2007 to 2010.

== Academic career ==
Keith Fitzgerald is also a political scientist specializing in American politics with a focus on institutions and public policy. He is the author of Face of the Nation: Immigration, the State, and the National Identity. He graduated from Trinity High School in Louisville, Kentucky in 1974. Following a stint at Grinnell College, since 1994 Fitzgerald has been a professor of political science at the New College of Florida. He received his B.A. from the University of Louisville and his Ph.D. from Indiana University Bloomington in 1987.

== Florida legislature ==
In December 2005, Keith Fitzgerald announced his candidacy for the Florida State House, running as a Democrat in District 69, which contains the city of Sarasota, Florida and part of Manatee county. Fitzgerald narrowly defeated Republican Laura Benson 51% to 49% in the November 2006 election.

In 2008 Fitzgerald was re-elected, again running against Laura Benson. In 2010 however, he was defeated by Ray Pilon.

== 2012 U.S. House campaign ==
Fitzgerald won the Democratic nomination to challenge Vern Buchanan in Florida's 16th congressional district.

Polling

A mid-July 2012 poll showed the incumbent US Rep. Vern Buchanan leading Keith Fitzgerald by a margin of 54%-32%. The poll had a margin of error of +/-4.9%.

An independent poll released on September 5, 2012, showed the incumbent US Rep. Vern Buchanan leading Keith Fitzgerald by a margin of 56%-37%. The poll had a margin of error of 4%-5%.

Finance

As of August 3, 2012, Fitzgerald's campaign had $670,000 in the bank, compared to Buchanan's $1.4 million. Democratic Minority Leader Nancy Pelosi and other House Democrats have supported Fitzgerald with at least $34,000 in campaign contributions.

The Democratic Congressional Campaign Committee reserved $2.5 million of ad time in the Tampa Bay media market, some or all of which may be used to help Fitzgerald. Meanwhile, Buchanan's campaign reserved $4 million in the same market. As of early September 2012, there has been no public announcement of an ad buy from Fitzgerald's campaign.

Fitzgerald won 46.4% of the vote, but failed to defeat Rep. Buchanan.
