= Alexandra Miller =

American politician and businesswoman

Alexandra C. "Alex" Miller
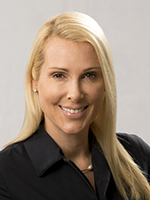

Member of the Florida House of Representatives from the 72nd district
- In office November 8, 2016 – September 1, 2017
- Preceded by: Ray Pilon
- Succeeded by: Margaret Good

Member of the Florida House of Representatives

Personal details
- Born: August 20, 1973 (age 53) Garden City, New York
- Party: Republican
- Education: University of Rhode Island (BA); Johns Hopkins University (MBA)
- Profession: CEO

Alex Miller (born August 20, 1973) is a Republican politician and businesswoman from Florida. She served half of her two-year term in the Florida House of Representatives, representing parts of Sarasota in District 72.

== History ==
Miller was born in Garden City, New York in 1973. Miller graduated from the University of Rhode Island with a BA in Psychology in 1995. She went on to receive her MBA at Johns Hopkins University's Carey Business School in 2009. She moved to Florida in 1995. Miller is a Christian.

== Business ==
Miller is the CEO of Mercedes Medical, a medical and laboratory supply company in Sarasota.

== Florida House of Representatives ==
Miller defeated Democrat Edward James in the 2016 general election. During her time in office, she sat on the Careers & Competition Subcommittee, Government Accountability Committee, Higher Education Appropriations Subcommittee, Local, Federal & Veterans Affairs Subcommittee, and Tourism & Gaming Control Subcommittee. On August 24, 2017, Miller announced her resignation from the Florida House of Representatives which was effective September 1, 2017. She cited not having enough time to raise her two teenage sons and focus on her rapidly growing business as reasons for her resignation. She is succeeded by Democrat Margaret Good.

== See also ==
- Florida House of Representatives
- Garden City, New York
