= Florida's 68th House of Representatives district =

American legislative district

Florida's 68th State House of Representatives district
Representative
| Lawrence McClure; R–Plant City |

Florida's 68th House district elects one member of the Florida House of Representatives. The district is represented by Lawrence McClure. This district is located in the eastern portion of Hillsborough County, Florida and encompasses Plant City.

== Representatives from 1967 to the present ==
Representatives by party affiliation
| Party | Representatives |
|---|---|
| Republican | 6 |
| Democratic | 3 |

| # | Name | Term of service | Residence | Political party |
|---|---|---|---|---|
| 1 | Richard Hodes | 1967–1982 | | Democratic |
| 2 | Peggy Simone | 1982–1992 | Bradenton | Republican |
| 3 | Julie McClure | 1992–1994 | Bradenton | Democratic |
| 4 | Mark Flanagan | 1994–2002 | | Republican |
| 5 | Bill Galvano | 2002–2010 | Bradenton | Republican |
| 6 | Jim Boyd | 2010–2012 | Bradenton | Republican |
| 7 | Dwight Dudley | 2012–2016 | St. Petersburg | Republican |
| 8 | Ben Diamond | 2016–2022 | Clearwater | Democratic |
| 9 | Lawrence McClure | 2022–2024 | Plant City | Republican |
