= Jim Lombard =

English-born American politician

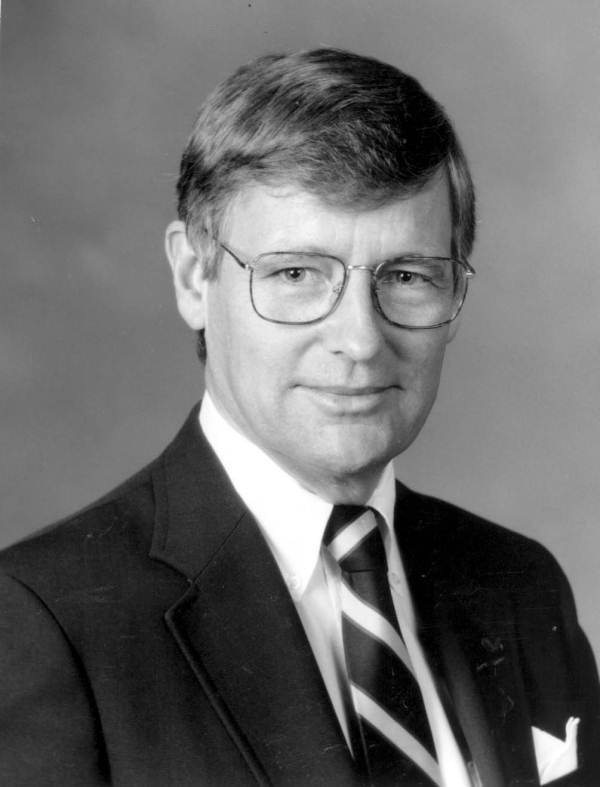

Member of the Florida House of Representatives for the 70th district
- In office November 6, 1984 – November 3, 1992
- Preceded by: Bob Thomas
- Succeeded by: David Thomas

Personal details
- Born: June 11, 1938 (age 88) London, England, United Kingdom
- Party: Republican

James M. Lombard (born June 11, 1938) is an English-born American politician in the state of Florida.

Lombard was born in London, England in 1938 and came to Florida in 1976. He received a B.A. from Harvard University in 1961 and did post-graduate work at Boston University. During his time at Harvard he was a member of the varsity hockey team (1959–60 and 1960-61 seasons). He is a businessman. He served in the Florida House of Representatives from 1984 to 1992 for district 70. He is a member of the Republican Party and is a former Minority Leader of the House.
