= Margaret Good =

American politician

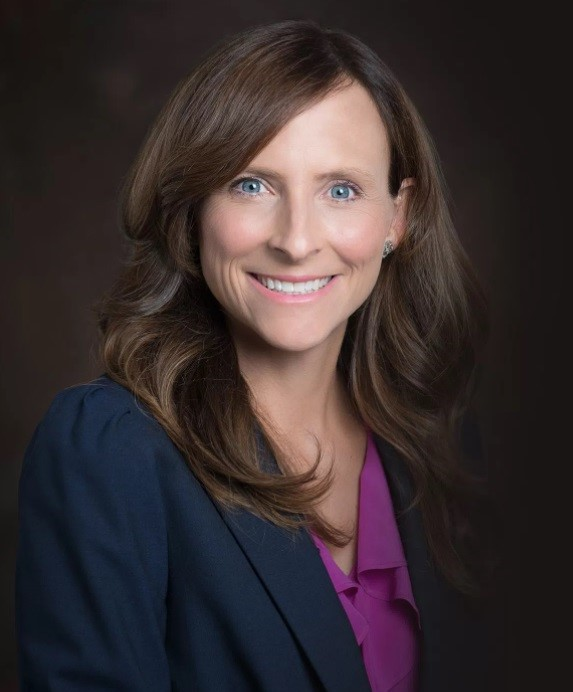

Member of the Florida House of Representatives from the 72nd district
- In office February 13, 2018 – November 3, 2020
- Preceded by: Alexandra Miller
- Succeeded by: Fiona McFarland

Personal details
- Born: August 23, 1976 (age 49)
- Party: Democratic
- Education: University of South Carolina (BA); University of Washington (MA); University of Florida (JD)
- Website: Government website

Margaret Elizabeth Rowell Good (born August 23, 1976) is an American lawyer and politician from Florida. She served in the Florida House of Representatives from 2018 to 2020, representing the Sarasota area. She is a member of the Democratic Party.

== Early life and career ==
Good grew up in Georgia and earned her bachelor's degree in German from the University of South Carolina and her master's degree from the University of Washington. She earned her Juris Doctor from the University of Florida School of Law and was an attorney with the law firm Eastmoore Crauwels & DuBose.

== Political career ==
Good defeated Republican James Buchanan, son of Vern Buchanan, and Libertarian Alison Foxall in a special election on February 13, 2018, to fill a vacancy in the Florida House. Good was closely re-elected in the November 2018 general election, defeating former state representative Ray Pilon.

In 2019, Good announced her candidacy for Florida's 16th congressional district, which has been held by Vern Buchanan since 2007. She lost the election by 11%.

== Electoral history ==
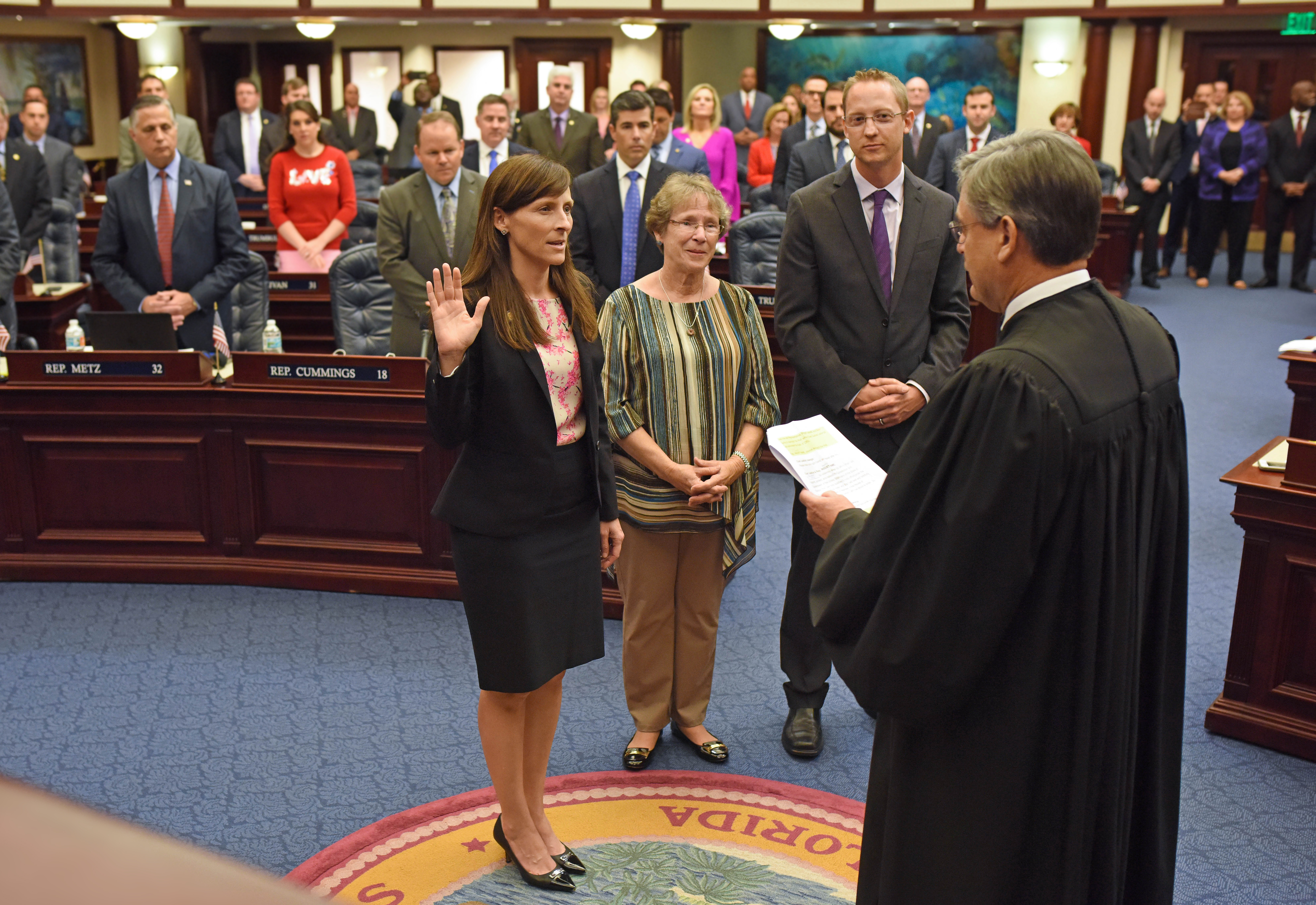
Good being sworn in as a State Representative in 2018

Florida House of Representatives Special Primary Election, District 72
Party	Candidate	Votes	%	±%
Democratic	Margaret Good	6,152	72.41	+72.41
Democratic	Ruta Jouniari	2,344	27.59	+27.59
Turnout		8,504	100.0	

Florida House of Representatives Special Election, District 72
Party	Candidate	Votes	%	±%
Democratic	Margaret Good	23,039	52.17	+10.23
Republican	James Buchanan	19,782	46.8	−13.26
Libertarian	Alison Foxall	1,338	3.03	N/A
Turnout		44,218	100.0	
Democratic gain from Republican		Swing		

Florida House of Representatives 2018 General Election
Party	Candidate	Votes	%	±%
Democratic	Margaret Good	41,413	50.70	−1.47
Republican	Ray Pilon	40,268	49.3	+2.5
Turnout		81,681	100.0	
Democratic hold		Swing		

Florida's 16th congressional district, 2020
Party	Candidate	Votes	%
Republican	Vern Buchanan (incumbent)	269,001	55.50%
Democratic	Margaret Good	215,683	44.49%
Total votes		484,684	100.0
Republican hold			

== See also ==
- Florida House of Representatives

Florida House of Representatives
Preceded by Alexandra Miller	Member of the Florida House of Representatives from the 72nd district 2018–2020	Succeeded by Fiona McFarland
