= Jake Raburn =

American politician

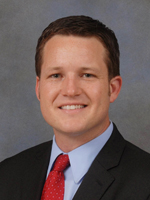

Member of the Florida House of Representatives from the 57th district
- In office November 6, 2012 – November 6, 2018
- Preceded by: Redistricted
- Succeeded by: Mike Beltran (redistricting)

Personal details
- Born: January 15, 1985 (age 41) Plant City, Florida
- Party: Republican
- Spouse: Melissa Hinton Raburn
- Children: Jackson
- Education: University of Florida (B.S.)
- Profession: Agricultural marketing

Jake Raburn (born January 15, 1985) is a Republican politician and a former member of the Florida House of Representatives, representing the 57th District, including eastern Hillsborough County, from 2012 to 2018.

== History ==
Raburn was born in Plant City and graduated from Plant City High School, after which he attended the University of Florida, where he graduated with a degree in agricultural communication in 2007. He then joined the Florida Department of Citrus as a marketing specialist for two years. Afterwards, Raburn began working as a marketing director for Hinton Farms Produce, Inc., a farming operation owned by his wife's family.

== Florida House of Representatives ==
In 2012, following the reconfiguration of the Florida House of Representatives districts, Raburn ran in the newly created 57th District, which was based in the rural, eastern parts of Hillsborough County. He was opposed in the Republican primary by Brian Hollands; the Tampa Bay Times endorsed Raburn over Hollands, praising him as "more supportive of the public schools" and noting that Raburn "also had a broader outlook on the need to invest in transportation and other infrastructure." He ultimately defeated Hollands with nearly 70% of the vote. In the general election, he faced Bruce Barnett, the Democratic nominee, and earned the endorsement of the Tampa Tribune, which, although it observed that "Barnett is more knowledgeable on growth and education issues," Raburn deserved the nod because he "offers the valuable perspective of a farmer and seems well-connected to the district." In the end, Raburn defeated Barnett by a solid margin of victory, winning 58% of the vote. In 2014, Raburn was re-elected to his second term in the legislature without opposition.
