= Lisa Carlton =

Republican politician from Florida

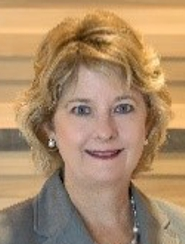

Member of the Florida Senate
- In office November 3, 1998 – November 4, 2008
- Preceded by: Katherine Harris
- Succeeded by: Nancy Detert
- Constituency: 24th district (1998–2002); 23rd district (2002–2008)

Member of the Florida House of Representatives from the 70th district
- In office November 8, 1994 – November 3, 1998
- Preceded by: David Thomas
- Succeeded by: Nancy Detert

Personal details
- Born: May 7, 1964 (age 62) Sarasota County, Florida, U.S.
- Party: Republican
- Spouse: Robert Robinson
- Education: Stetson University (BA); Mercer University (JD)
- Profession: Attorney, cattle and citrus business

Lisa Carlton is a Republican politician from Florida who served in the Florida Senate from 1998 to 2008 representing parts of Southwest Florida around Sarasota. She served as the President Pro Tempore of the Florida Senate from 2006 to 2008. Carlton served two terms in the Florida House of Representatives, representing parts of Sarasota County from 1994 to 1998. Carlton currently serves as a guest lecturer at the Lou Frey Institute of Politics and Government at the University of Central Florida in Orlando, Florida.

She was appointed by Governor Rick Scott to serve on the 2017-2018 Florida Constitution Revision Commission. Her great uncle is Doyle E. Carlton who served as Governor of Florida from 1929 to 1933.

== Personal life ==
Florida House of Representatives
Preceded by David Thomas	Member of the Florida House of Representatives from the 70th district 1994–1998	Succeeded by Nancy Detert
Florida Senate
Preceded by Katherine Harris	Member of the Florida Senate from the 24th district 1998–2002	Succeeded by Bill Posey
Preceded by Tom Lee	Member of the Florida Senate from the 23rd district 2002–2008	Succeeded by Nancy Detert
