= James Buchanan (Florida politician) =

American politician from Florida

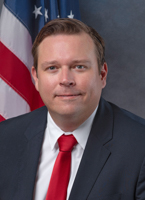
- Official portrait, 2018

Member of the Florida House of Representatives from the 74th district
- Incumbent
- Assumed office November 6, 2018
- Preceded by: Julio Gonzalez

Personal details
- Born: James Vernon Buchanan; January 10, 1982 (age 44) Farmington Hills, Michigan, U.S.
- Party: Republican
- Relatives: Vern Buchanan (father)
- Education: Florida State University (BS); University of South Florida (MBA)
- Website: Campaign website

James Vernon Buchanan (/bjuːˈkænən/ bew-KAN-ən; born January 10, 1982) is an American politician in the state of Florida. A Republican, he is a member of the Florida House of Representatives representing the state's 74th district, which includes part of Sarasota County.

== History ==
In his first run for elected office, Buchanan was defeated by Democrat Margaret Good in a nationally publicized February 2018 special election to fill the 72nd district seat in the Florida House. Buchanan had previously been a candidate in the 71st district, but withdrew his candidacy. He played for Florida State Football under coach Bobby Bowden.

Buchanan is the son of U.S. Rep. Vern Buchanan.

== Florida House of Representatives ==
Buchanan defeated Linda Yates in the August 28, 2018 Republican primary, winning 59.2% of the vote. In the November 6, 2018 general election, Buchanan won 56.91% of the vote, defeating Democrat Tony Mowry and a third candidate. This is the third State House district Buchanan has run for, and his first successful candidacy.

== Committee assignments ==
- Agriculture, Conservation & Resiliency Subcommittee Chair
- Ways & Means Committee Vice Chair
- Infrastructure Strategies Committee
- State Affairs Committee
- Agriculture & Natural Resources Appropriations Subcommittee
