= Mark Flanagan (politician) =

American politician

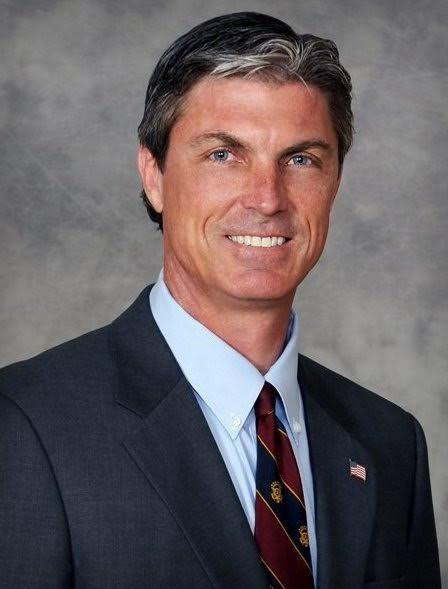

Member of the Florida House of Representatives from the 68th district
- In office November 5, 1994 – November 4, 2002
- Preceded by: Julie McClure
- Succeeded by: Bill Galvano

Personal details
- Born: February 14, 1963 (age 63) Newton, Massachusetts, U.S.
- Party: Republican
- Profession: Financial Consultant

Mark G. Flanagan (born February 14, 1963, in Newton, Massachusetts) is a Republican politician who formally served as a member of the Florida House of Representatives from 1994 to 2002. He represented the 68th district, encompassing west Manatee County and a small segment of southern Hillsborough County.

== History ==
Flanagan was born in Newton, Massachusetts, and moved to Florida in 1972. He first attended University of Florida from 1980 to 1981 and then the University of San Francisco, where he received his bachelor's degree in US History in 1985.

== Florida House of Representatives ==
In 1994, Flanagan ran for the 68th district for the Florida House of Representatives, unseating incumbent Democrat Julie McClure. During his first term, Flanagan became the Vice Chair for the Manatee County Legislative Delegation. He also served on the Republican Conference Policy Committee from 1994 to 1996 and the Florida Family Safety Task Force from 1995 to 1996. He was re-elected in 1998 for a second term in the Florida House of Representatives.

Throughout his second term, Flanagan served as the chair for the Manatee County Legislative Delegation. He also served as a member of the Budget Conference Committee from 1997 to 1998. Flanagan campaigned on his support for small businesses and tort reform, opposing tax increases, protecting families by fighting for the rights of the unborn, supporting federal vouchers for the Manatee County public school system, and safeguarding social security and medicare.

Flanagan sponsored the "Move Over Act," which was signed into law by Governor Jeb Bush on May 1, 2002. The law required drivers move over a lane or slow down when approaching an authorized emergency vehicle stopped alongside a highway in Florida. Flanagan also passed legislation creating the state position of chief financial officer, closing some crime victims' public records, regulating hospital discharges of new mothers, and facilitating online corporate filings.

== Post-House Elections ==
Unable to seek a fifth term in 2002 due to term limits, Flanagan ran for the District 21 state Senate seat, which had been vacated by former Senate President John McKay. Flanagan lost to Bradenton Republican Mike Bennett.

In 2006, Mark Flanagan resigned as chairman of the Manatee County Republican Party to run for United States Congress in Florida's Thirteenth Congressional District, which had been vacated by former Florida Secretary of State Katherine Harris. Flanagan lost in the Republican primary to Vern Buchanan.

In 2011, Flanagan was chosen as the co-chair for Manatee County for Mitt Romney's presidential campaign.

== 2009 incident ==
In 2009, Flanagan was wrongfully arrested for obstruction of justice and resisting arrest in Bradenton. During an investigation Manatee Sheriff's deputy Lee Harrington went to Flanagan's home seeking the location of Flanagan's son. When Flanagan came to the door he requested that the deputy leave his business card and stated that he would not speak to Harrington without a lawyer, the deputy entered the home, tackled, and arrested Flanagan for "impeding" his investigation. These charges were quickly dropped, and Harrington was temporarily reassigned and an internal investigation into the arrest began. The investigation found that Flanagan's arrest was unlawful; the Sheriff's Office demoted Harrington to the dispatch center, suspended him for 120 hours, and docked 120 hours of vacation pay.

== Personal ==
Flanagan is an avid runner and has completed several marathons, including the Boston Marathon in 2004, 2006, 2008, and 2011.
