= Vern Buchanan =

American politician (born 1951)

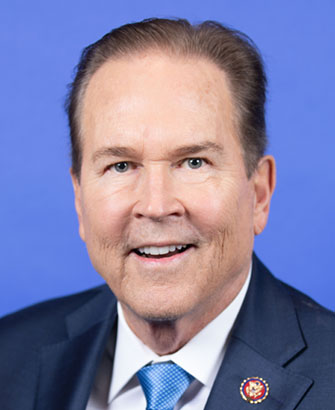
- Official portrait, 2022

Member of the U.S. House of Representatives from Florida
- Incumbent
- Assumed office January 3, 2007
- Preceded by: Katherine Harris
- Constituency: 13th district (2007–2013); 16th district (2013–present)

Personal details
- Born: Vernon Gale Buchanan; May 8, 1951 (age 75) Detroit, Michigan, U.S.
- Party: Republican
- Children: 2, including James
- Education: Cleary University (BBA); University of Detroit (MBA)
- Website: House website Campaign website

Military service
- Branch/service: United States Air Force
- Years of service: 1969–1975
- Unit: Michigan Air National Guard
- Buchanan's voice Buchanan supporting the Thin Blue Line Act. Recorded May 18, 2017

Vernon Gale Buchanan (/bjuːˈkænən/ bew-KAN-ən; born May 8, 1951) is an American businessman, politician, and Air Force National Guard veteran serving as the U.S. representative for Florida's 16th congressional district since 2013. A member of the Republican Party, he first entered Congress in 2007, representing Florida's 13th congressional district until redistricting. His district is anchored by Bradenton. On January 27, 2026, Buchanan announced he would not run for re-election in 2026.

Buchanan is on the House Ways and Means Committee, which has jurisdiction over tax policy, international trade, health care and Social Security. Before serving in Congress, Buchanan was in business for over 30 years and chaired both the Greater Sarasota Chamber of Commerce and Florida Chamber of Commerce. He served as a member of the board and the executive committee of the United States Chamber of Commerce.

== Early life and education ==
Buchanan grew up in Inkster, Michigan, a small town outside Detroit, the son of a factory foreman in a family of six children. His maternal grandparents immigrated to the United States from Finland. When he graduated from high school in 1969, he joined the Michigan Air National Guard, serving there for six years. Buchanan got a bachelor's degree in business administration from Cleary University and a master's in business administration from the University of Detroit.

== Business career ==
Buchanan’s estimated net worth is $261.77 million. In his June 2007 financial disclosure filing, Buchanan reported over $100 million in assets, making him among the five wealthiest members of Congress. Most of his wealth is from his automotive empire, which includes several dealerships in Florida. He also reported ownership interests in about 50 other businesses, including offshore reinsurance companies and a charter-jet business. He reported receiving at least $19.5 million in income from these businesses in 2006.

=== American Speedy Printing ===
In May 1976, Buchanan convinced the owner of a Michigan printing company, Jim McDonald, that he could help the business grow. The two founded American Speedy Printing, which grew through franchising to more than 730 stores in 44 states. Later, Buchanan and American Speedy Printing were defendants in a string of lawsuits during the late 1980s and early 1990s by franchisees and master franchisees, who said they were not making the money that Buchanan had said they could expect. After filing for bankruptcy, he was accused by a creditors' committee of taking excessive compensation and actions that resulted in overstated earnings for American Speedy Printing. In a 1995 deposition, he said that he had no personal obligation to repay a large corporate loan from Merrill Lynch. A dispute with the Internal Revenue Service over taxes on the money Buchanan received from Merrill Lynch stretched through the 1990s. Buchanan, his business partner, and Merrill Lynch were sued for violating the Michigan Corporation Act. It ended with Buchanan paying $1.5 million.

=== Car dealerships ===
In 1992, Buchanan bought a Honda and Acura dealership in Ocala, Florida. In late 1999, he bought two more dealerships. He continued to acquire dealerships after that, but in 2006 he sold five dealerships and other businesses in order to concentrate on politics. His dealerships had $756 million in sales in 2005.

=== Reinsurance companies ===
Buchanan owns two reinsurance companies—Jamat Reinsurance Co. and Buchanan Reinsurance Co., in Turks and Caicos, and part of the Bermuda reinsurance company Greater Atlantic Insurance Co. The three companies offer extended warranty policies to car buyers. Buchanan invests some of the proceeds from his reinsurance companies in real estate developments in the Bahamas.

=== Ritz-Carlton ===
In 1999, Buchanan was approached to help to finance the Ritz-Carlton condo-hotel development in Sarasota. Buchanan was cut out of the project. The developers, Robert Buford and Kevin Daves, said he lied about his financial means. Buchanan sued, and the parties settled in 2001. Per a structured settlement, Buchanan bought a condo from a nephew of Buford's for $5 million; the nephew had purchased it the day before for $2.368 million. Buchanan owned the unit for a little more than a year and then sold it to another member of Buford's family for $6.35 million. The arrangement resulted in Buchanan paying taxes on his gain at the reduced long-term capital gains rate. Buford benefited from the apartment's increased appraised value and the use of Buchanan's $5 million. In the year he owned the penthouse, Buchanan used it for charity fundraisers.

=== PPP loans and criticism ===
In 2022, Buchanan had $2.3 million in PPP loans forgiven. Buchanan was criticized for his hypocrisy regarding President Biden's student loan debt forgiveness.

== Political campaigns ==
=== 2006 ===
==== Primary election ====
Buchanan ran in the 13th congressional district in Florida to replace incumbent Republican Katherine Harris, who was the Republican nominee for the U.S. Senate. Buchanan won the Republican primary with 32% of the vote, against four opponents. His closest challengers were Nancy C. Detert, with 25% of the vote, and Tramm Hudson, with 24%.

In the November general election, Buchanan faced Democrat Christine Jennings, a banking executive. There were 216,000 registered Republicans and about 155,000 registered Democrats in the district, but Jennings polled ahead of Buchanan up to election day. Buchanan put more than $5 million of his own money into his campaign.

In October, Vice President Dick Cheney held a fund-raising luncheon for Buchanan; later that month, President George W. Bush held a fund-raising reception for him. Between the two events, Governor Jeb Bush, Senator Mel Martinez, and Massachusetts Governor Mitt Romney came to the district to campaign for Buchanan.

Republican primary results
Party	Candidate	Votes	%
Republican	Vern Buchanan	20,918	32.33
Republican	Nancy Detert	15,804	24.43
Republican	Tramm Hudson	15,535	24.01
Republican	Mark Flanagan	6,465	9.99
Republican	Donna Clarke	5,972	9.23
Total votes		64,694	100.00

==== General election ====
Initial results of the November election showed Buchanan leading by less than 350 votes. Due to the closeness of the race, and a high undervote of 18,000 in Sarasota County, a recount was ordered. Sarasota County voters had given more votes to a hospital board than they had to their Congressional representative—with 13% of voters not voting, compared to an average of 2% in neighboring counties. The touch-screen voting machines used provided no paper record. On November 20, 2006, the Florida Department of State certified the results of the recount, which showed Buchanan winning by 369 votes.

Jennings challenged the results of the election in court, citing "pervasive malfunctioning of electronic voting machines." In December 2006, a Florida circuit judge ruled that her claim that voting machines in Sarasota County lost up to 18,000 votes was "conjecture" and didn't warrant overriding the trade secrets of the voting machine company. In June 2007, a Florida state appellate court ruled that Jennings did not meet the "extraordinary burden" of proving the lower court judge was wrong. Another suit, filed by voters represented by Voter Action, People For the American Way Foundation, the ACLU of Florida, and the Electronic Frontier Foundation was also dismissed.

The U.S. House of Representatives had the right to make the final determination as to whether Buchanan would hold the seat for the remainder of the term or be replaced by Jennings. In April, a three-person House task force was created to evaluate the election. In early May, the task force voted along party lines to refer an investigation into Florida's 13th district House race to the Government Accountability Office (GAO). On February 25, 2008, the committee and the House accepted the GAO's findings that no machine error was demonstrated as sufficient to have altered the outcome of the election. The House passed HR 989 affirming the committee's findings, accepting the results of the race, and formally dismissing Jennings's challenge of the election results. Jennings formally dropped her challenge shortly thereafter to focus on a 2008 rematch against Buchanan.

General Election Results, 2006
Party	Candidate	Votes	%
Republican	Vern Buchanan	119,309	50.08
Democratic	Christine Jennings	118,940	49.92
Total votes		238,249	100.00
Republican hold			

=== 2008 ===
Buchanan defeated Jennings with 55% of the vote to her 38%. On election night, he said, "What a difference two years makes."

General Elections Results, 2008
Party	Candidate	Votes	%
Republican	Vern Buchanan (incumbent)	204,382	55.5
Democratic	Christine Jennings	137,967	37.5
Independent	Jan Schneider	20,289	5.5
Independent	Don Baldauf	5,358	1.5
Total votes		367,996	100.00
Republican hold			

=== 2010 ===
In May 2009, Buchanan announced his candidacy for reelection. He defeated Don Baldauf in the Republican primary, and Reverend James T. Golden in the general, with 68.9% of the vote.

General Election Results, 2010
Party	Candidate	Votes	%
Republican	Vern Buchanan (incumbent)	183,811	68.9
Democratic	James T. Golden	83,123	31.1
Total votes		266,464	100.00
Republican hold			

=== 2012 ===
In 2012, Buchanan defeated Democratic former state representative Keith Fitzgerald with 53.6% of the vote. This is his narrowest victory since 2006.

General Election Results, 2012
Party	Candidate	Votes	%
Republican	Vern Buchanan (incumbent)	187,147	53.6
Democratic	Keith Fitzgerald	161,929	46.4
Total votes		349,076	100.0
Republican hold			

=== 2014 ===
In 2014, Buchanan defeated Democratic nominee Henry Lawrence with 61.5% of the vote to Lawrence's 38.4%.

General Election Results, 2014
Party	Candidate	Votes	%
Republican	Vern Buchanan (incumbent)	169,126	61.5
Democratic	Henry Lawrence	105,483	38.4
Independent	Joe Newman (write-in)	220	0.1
Total votes		274,829	100.0
Republican hold			

=== 2016 ===
In 2016, Buchanan defeated Democratic nominee Jan Schneider, an attorney and author, with 59.8% of the vote to Schneider's 40.2%.

==== Results ====
General Election Results, 2016
Party	Candidate	Votes	%
Republican	Vern Buchanan (incumbent)	230,654	59.8
Democratic	Jan Schneider	155,262	40.2
Total votes		385,916	100.0
Republican hold			

=== 2018 ===
In 2018, Buchanan defeated the Democratic nominee, attorney David Shapiro, with 54.6% of the vote.

General Election Results, 2018
Party	Candidate	Votes	%
Republican	Vern Buchanan (incumbent)	197,483	54.6
Democratic	David Shapiro	164,463	45.4
Total votes		361,946	100.0
Republican hold			

=== 2020 ===
In 2020, Buchanan defeated Democratic nominee Margaret Good with 55.5% of the vote. Good defeated Buchanan's son James in a closely watched special election in 2018.

In February 2021, Buchanan announced his candidacy for reelection in 2022.

General Election Results, 2020
Party	Candidate	Votes	%
Republican	Vern Buchanan (incumbent)	269,001	55.50%
Democratic	Margaret Good	215,683	44.49%
Total votes		484,684	100.0
Republican hold			

=== 2022 ===
In 2022, Buchanan won a 9th term by defeating Democratic nominee Jan Schneider, who was the previous nominee in 2016, with 62% of the vote. Buchanan's constituency changed as a result of the 2020 redistricting cycle. The new 16th district no longer encompasses Sarasota County.

Florida's 16th congressional district, 2022
Party	Candidate	Votes	%
Republican	Vern Buchanan (incumbent)	189,762	62.1
Democratic	Jan Schneider	115,575	37.9
Independent	Ralph E. Hartman (write-in)	21	0.0
Total votes		305,358	100.0
Republican hold			

=== 2024 ===
Buchanan faced his biggest primary challenge to date against Eddie Speir. Buchanan won by 20 points with 60% of the vote to Speir's 40%. Buchanan was endorsed by then-former President Donald Trump.

Republican primary results
Party	Candidate	Votes	%
Republican	Vern Buchanan (incumbent)	38,734	60.9
Republican	Eddie Speir	24,835	39.1
Total votes		63,569	100.0

== Criminal investigations ==
In July 2012, the House Ethics Committee cleared Buchanan of charges that he violated House rules by misleading Congress in his financial disclosure forms. After the issue was raised, Buchanan submitted revised forms. The committee "found no evidence that the errors were knowing or willful and unanimously determined that the errors were not substantively different from the hundreds or thousands of errors corrected by amendment at the requirement of the Committee every year."

In 2008, the watchdog group Citizens for Responsibility and Ethics in Washington (CREW) filed a Federal Election Commission (FEC) complaint alleging "straw donors" to Buchanan's campaign (campaign contributions from Buchanan's employees for which they were then reimbursed); in 2011, CREW requested a U.S. Department of Justice investigation. (The group also named Buchanan to its annual "most corrupt members of Congress" list in 2008, 2009, 2011, and 2012).

By 2012, Buchanan was being investigated by the House Ethics Committee, the FEC, the Justice Department, and the Office of Congressional Ethics over two separate allegations of campaign finance misconduct: that he had violated federal law and House rules by coercing a former business partner to sign a false affidavit to the FEC, and that he had illegally reimbursed car-dealership employees for campaign contributions. The latter allegation was also raised in a legal dispute with Sam Kazran, Buchanan's former business partner, who alleged that Buchanan engaged in a "cash swap scheme" in which employees were directed to write checks to Buchanan's campaign fund, then reimbursed by the company.

In 2012, the Justice Department ended its 11-month investigation with no criminal charges. The FEC also ended its investigation by 2012. Kazran agreed to pay $5,500 in fines "for improperly funneling money to Buchanan's campaign committee", and in May 2013 three men and two Tampa companies were fined a total of $16,000 by the FEC for illegal campaign contributions to Buchanan. In 2016, after a four-year inquiry, the House Ethics Committee ended its investigation, finding "insufficient evidence" of wrongdoing on Buchanan's part.

Kazran filed a separate breach of contract lawsuit against Buchanan in Florida state court; Buchanan prevailed in that litigation.

Beginning in 2008, Buchanan faced lawsuits by six former employees, who alleged "conspiracy, fraud, and retaliatory personnel actions" as well as the hiring of undocumented immigrants and consumer fraud. None of those cases made it to trial and by 2011 most had been "dismissed with no judgments against Buchanan."

On June 23, 2016, the House Ethics Committee released this statement, concluding its investigation into Buchanan: "Because the evidence is insufficient to conclude that Representative Buchanan himself was aware of the unlawful reimbursements at the time they occurred, or had any role in directing or approving of them, and the evidence is insufficient to find that Representative Buchanan attempted to improperly influence the testimony of Mr. Kazran before the FEC, the Committee has determined to take no further action in this matter, and upon publication of this Report, considers the matter closed."

== U.S. House of Representatives ==
=== Tenure ===
Buchanan was sworn in as Representative for Florida's 13th Congressional District on January 3, 2007. Congressional Quarterly noted that Buchanan voted in support of President Bush's legislative agenda 66% of the time in 2007, the third-lowest rate of the 16 members of Florida's Republican congressional delegation.

Buchanan secured federal funding of $2 million for reimbursement for cleanup efforts in Anna Maria Island and $4 million for cleaning up Wares Creek in Manatee County.

Buchanan introduced a constitutional amendment in January 2007 that would require Congress to pass a balanced budget if ratified. He introduced legislation to create a postage stamp honoring and assisting disabled veterans, and secured funding for the construction of a national veterans' cemetery in Sarasota County. He also introduced a bill to increase federal assistance for fighting gang crime and secured grant funding for local anti-gang efforts in Manatee County.

As of July 2008, Buchanan had voted to override five of Bush's vetoes of legislation passed by the 110th Congress. These override votes included a vote in support of expanding the coverage range of the SCHIP program, the 2008 farm bill, and the Water Resources Development Act.

On September 29, 2008, Buchanan voted against the Emergency Economic Stabilization Act of 2008, but changed his vote to support the bill in the October 3 second House vote.

Buchanan sponsored several bills in the 111th Congress, including House Resolution 1839, a Bill to Amend the Small Business Act to Improve SCORE (Service Corps of Retired Executives), which was introduced on April 1, 2009c. House Resolution 1839 would require the administrator of the Small Business Administration (SBA) to ensure that SCORE increases the proportion of small business mentors from socially or economically disadvantaged backgrounds, establish benchmarks for evaluating its activities and volunteers, and establish a mentoring program of one-on-one advice to small businesses from qualified counselors.

In the 112th Congress, Buchanan was named to a seat on the Ways and Means Committee, the only member from Florida serving on that committee. He was also asked by NRCC Chairman Pete Sessions to serve as vice chair of the committee.

In January 2011, Buchanan helped secure the construction of Sarasota National Cemetery through the Department of Veterans Affairs. The cemetery plans include 11,500 grave sites, 16,000 cremated remains sites, and other buildings and structures necessary for funerals for veterans and their families.

In June 2011, the House passed Buchanan's Military Tribunals for Terrorists Act as an amendment to the National Defense Authorization Act for Fiscal Year 2012. The amendment, approved by a largely party-line vote of 246–173, would "require all foreign terrorism suspects to be tried only in military tribunals and never in civilian courts."

In October 2011, Buchanan "played a large role" in the passage of free trade agreements with Colombia, Panama and South Korea. The treaties were backed by the White House and a bipartisan majority in Congress.

In December 2011, the House passed H.R. 527, a Buchanan-backed measure to close "loopholes in current law to ensure regulatory agencies will fully account for the effect of new regulations on small businesses before regulations are adopted."

In February 2012, Buchanan supported President Obama's proposal to lower the corporate tax rate from 35% to 28%. In a statement, Buchanan said, "I appreciate the president's willingness to engage on such an important issue."

In 2011, Buchanan and Representative Ed Markey introduced the Pill Mill Crackdown Act of 2011, legislation that would require money seized from so-called pill mills to be directed to drug treatment programs; "increase fines and sentences for those convicted of running pill mills"; and make hydrocodone drugs such as Vicodin more difficult to obtain. The bill received bipartisan support in both the House and the Senate (where introduced companion bill was introduced), but never made it out of committee.

=== Committee assignments ===
For the 118th Congress:

- Committee on Ways and Means
  - Subcommittee on Health (Chair)
  - Subcommittee on Trade
- Joint Committee on Taxation

=== Caucus memberships ===
- Republican Study Committee
- Congressional Arts Caucus
- Congressional NextGen 9-1-1 Caucus
- United States Congressional International Conservation Caucus
- Congressional Ukraine Caucus
- Rare Disease Caucus

== Political positions ==
=== Animal welfare ===
Buchanan has co-chaired the Congressional Animal Protection Caucus. He is the only member of Congress to be named Legislator of the Year by the Humane Society of the United States more than once, in 2015 and 2020.

In 2018, Buchanan and Representative Alcee Hastings introduced the Dog and Cat Meat Trade Prohibition Act of 2018, which outlawed the consumption of dogs and cats. It passed the House in September 2018 and was enacted as part of the 2018 Farm Bill. In 2019, Buchanan and Representative Ted Deutch introduced the Preventing Animal Cruelty and Torture (PACT) Act, which made malicious animal cruelty a federal felony. It was signed into law in November 2019.

Buchanan and Representative Jan Schakowsky have authored legislation to permanently ban horse slaughter in the United States and prohibit the live export of horses to be slaughtered in Canada and Mexico. In 2021, Buchanan and Hastings authored legislation to establish a center under the National Institutes of Health to minimize the use of animal testing in biomedical research.

In October 2023, Buchanan was one of 16 House Republicans who signed a letter to the House Agriculture Committee opposing the inclusion of the Ending Agricultural Trade Suppression (EATS) Act in the 2023 farm bill. The EATS Act would have overturned the California farm animal welfare law Proposition 12, which restricts the sale of food products from animals raised in intensive battery cages, gestation crates, and veal crates.

=== Economy ===
Buchanan voted for the Tax Cuts and Jobs Act of 2017. With an estimated $55 million in real estate assets, Buchanan directly benefits from the loophole that lowers the tax rate on pass-through income from real estate. After the act passed, Buchanan said the changes were what "Floridians have needed for a long time." The bill also includes a measure, created by Buchanan, to provide tax relief to citrus growers impacted by Hurricane Irma.

Buchanan was among the 71 Republicans who voted against final passage of the Fiscal Responsibility Act of 2023 in the House.

=== Gun policy ===
Buchanan characterizes himself as "a strong defender of the Second Amendment, a Life Member of the NRA, and a gun owner and hunter."

As of 2020, Buchanan had a rating of B− from the NRA Political Victory Fund. This was down from an "A−" in 2017, and an "A" rating in 2014, indicating a voting record that is generally pro-gun rights. The Florida Center for Investigative Reporting reported that Buchanan received a total of $25,830 for his campaigns in 2010 and 2012 in the form of direct contributions or independent expenditures from NRA-affiliated PACs.

After the 2017 Las Vegas shooting, Buchanan indicated support for regulation of bump stocks, saying, "Bump stocks generating automatic rates of fire should face the same restrictions as automatic weapons." After the Stoneman Douglas High School shooting, Giffords, an organization helmed by Gabby Giffords, announced that Buchanan was on its "incumbent-defeat priority list" in response to the organization's perception that Republican Congress members are blocking efforts to reduce gun violence.

In March 2021, Buchanan was one of eight Republicans to join the House majority in passing the Bipartisan Background Checks Act of 2021.

In 2022, however, Buchanan would vote against S. 2938: Bipartisan Safer Communities Act, a bipartisan gun control bill which was sponsored by Republican Senator John Cornyn.

=== Immigration and refugees ===
Buchanan supported President Donald Trump's 2017 executive order to bar entry to the U.S. to citizens of seven Muslim-majority countries and also supported Trump's executive order to bar federal funding to so-called sanctuary cities, saying "LONG OVERDUE ... Time to protect Americans."

=== LGBT rights ===
Buchanan voted against the Equality Act.

== Personal life ==
Buchanan lives in Longboat Key, Florida, with his wife, Sandy, whom he met in college. The Buchanans have two sons. His son James was elected to the Florida House of Representatives in 2018. Buchanan is a Baptist.

The U.S. Chamber of Commerce gave Buchanan its Spirit of Enterprise award in 2009. Buchanan is a former board member of the chamber, which endorsed him in his 2006 and 2008 campaigns for the 13th Congressional District seat.

Also in 2009, the Veterans of Foreign Wars gave Buchanan their Legislative Achievement Award for his work on legislation improving the quality of life of active and reserve service members, military retirees, veterans and their families.

On July 19, 2021, Buchanan announced that he had tested positive for COVID-19 despite being fully vaccinated, becoming the first member of Congress to do so. He began quarantining at home and urged Americans to remain vigilant despite the vaccines' efficacy.

With a net worth of $157.2 million, Buchanan is the 6th-wealthiest member of Congress.

=== Veterans ===
Buchanan voted against the Honoring our PACT Act of 2022 which expanded VA benefits to veterans exposed to toxic chemicals during their military service.

U.S. House of Representatives
Preceded by Katherine Harris	Member of the U.S. House of Representatives from Florida's 13th congressional district 2007–2013	Succeeded by Bill Young
Preceded by Tom Rooney	Member of the U.S. House of Representatives from Florida's 16th congressional district 2013–present	Incumbent
Preceded by David Price	Ranking Member of the House Democracy Partnership; 2019–2023	Succeeded by Dina Titus
Preceded by David Price	Chair of the House Democracy Partnership; 2023–present	Incumbent
U.S. order of precedence (ceremonial)
Preceded by Gus Bilirakis	United States representatives by seniority 54th	Succeeded by Kathy Castor
Preceded by Gus Bilirakis	Order of precedence of the United States	Succeeded by Kathy Castor
