= Florida Center for Investigative Reporting =

- Founded: 2010
- Registration no.: 27-1187698 (EIN)
- Location: Florida
- Region served: Florida
- Website: fcir.org

Florida Center for Investigative Reporting (FCIR) was a non-profit created and founded in 2010 by Florida investigative journalists Trevor Aaronson and Mc Nelly Torres. Its stated mission was to investigate "corruption, waste and miscarriages of justice". In August 2021, FCIR ceased operations and was absorbed by Inside Climate News.

== Investigations ==
FCIR reported that state of Florida officials allegedly ordered employees of the Florida Department of Environmental Protection not to use the terms global warming, climate change, and sustainability in their communications.

Another investigation by FCIR alleged repeated records requests by private parties to obtain records of businesses that had been hired to work with state agencies, followed, in some cases, by lawsuits. Legislation has since been introduced to modify Florida's sunshine law so as to protect those businesses.

FCIR has also been in the news for investigating a new trend in Florida toward establishment of toll lanes. And, in 2011, FCIR helped uncover high school diploma mills. A description of other investigations by FCIR is available at its website.
