= The Bradenton Herald =

Newspaper from Bradenton, Florida, US

Bradenton Herald

- The July 27, 2005 front page of The Bradenton Herald
- Type: Daily newspaper
- Format: Broadsheet
- Owner: The McClatchy Company
- Founded: September 15, 1922; 103 years ago (as The Evening Herald)
- Language: English
- Headquarters: 1111 Third Avenue West; Bradenton, FL 34205; United States
- Circulation: 6,117 Daily; 8,131 Sunday (as of 2021)
- Website: bradenton.com

The Bradenton Herald is a newspaper based in Bradenton, Florida, in the United States.

== History ==
On September 15, 1922, Volume 1, Number 1 was published as The Evening Herald. It was a merger of two weekly papers: the Manatee River Journal, which had published since the 1880s, and The Bradentown Herald Weekly. The newspaper was at No. 414 Pine Street in downtown Bradenton; the phone number, 28. In the mid-1920s, Pine Street was renamed and the newspaper's home was at 401 13th St. W. (It would remain there until July 1984, when it moved to its present home at 102 Manatee Ave. W.) The Evening Herald was published Monday through Saturday until 1926, when the Saturday publication was replaced by a Sunday edition and the name was changed to The Bradenton Herald. In 1953 the Saturday edition resumed.

Co-owners Raymond P. Sponenbarger and Robert W. Bentley sold the paper in 1925 to the R.W. Page Corp. of Columbus, Ga. Alvah H. Chapman Sr. became publisher and served in that capacity until 1937 when W. E. Page Sr., the company's president, was killed in a car accident en route to Bradenton from Columbus. Chapman then became president of the Page Corp. and moved to Columbus with his family. His son, Alvah H. Chapman Jr., would follow in his father's footsteps and retired in 1989 as chairman of Knight-Ridder Inc., which was then the publisher of The Bradenton Herald. The Page Corp. had become part of Knight Newspapers Inc. in 1973; Knight Newspapers and Ridder Publications Inc. merged in 1974 and the Herald became a KR paper.

In 2006, The Bradenton Herald was again sold, as one of the newspapers included in the sale of Knight Ridder newspapers to The McClatchy Company, based in Sacramento, California. From its modest beginnings in 1922 as The Evening Herald, The Bradenton Herald has grown and changed along with its community. The Herald shed its "evening" past on January 1, 1983, when it became a morning publication. The next year, it moved from its cramped, old downtown building to an 87,000-square-foot building, where it also shed its aging Linotype machines for offset printing. It published its last edition on 13th Street on July 7, 1984, and its first edition on Manatee Avenue on July 8, 1984.

The Herald entered cyberspace in January 1996 when its website, www.Bradenton.com, was launched as Bradenton Herald Internet Plus (BHIP). The Bradenton Herald online edition went behind a paywall in December 2012. Currently subscribers can get unlimited access for 99 cents for a trial month and under $7 a month after that.

The Bradenton Herald moved in September 2013 to its new headquarters in downtown Bradenton located at 1111 Third Ave. W.

In May 2016 The Bradenton Herald discontinued production of its zoned edition, The Lakewood Ranch Herald, which had focused on local coverage of the rapidly growing eastern region of Manatee County since 2006.

On February 13, 2020, The McClatchy Company and 54 affiliated companies filed for Chapter 11 bankruptcy protection in the United States District Court for the Southern District of New York. The company cited pension obligations and excessive debt as the primary reasons for the filing.

== See also ==
- List of newspapers in Florida
