= Florida's 70th House of Representatives district =

Florida district

Florida's 70th State House of Representatives district
Representative
Michael Owen; R–Lithia

Florida's 70th House of Representatives district elects one member of the Florida House of Representatives. It covers parts of Hillsborough County and Manatee County.

== Members ==
- Mike Beltran (2018–2024)
- Michael Owen (since 2024)
