= George Hieber =

American politician

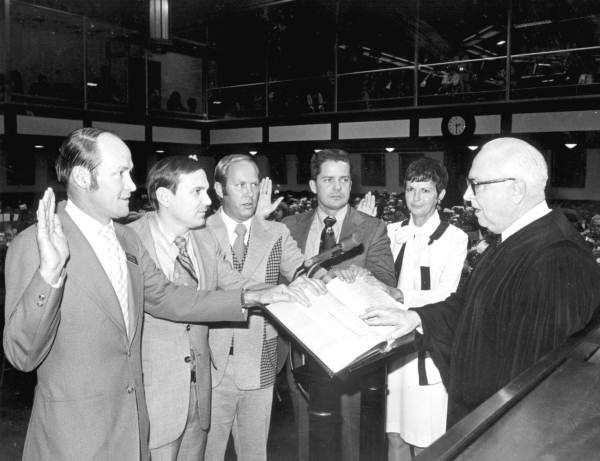
- Hieber with Dick Price, Dennis McDonald, Roger H. Wilson and Betty Easley, 1974

Member of the Florida House of Representatives from the 58th district
- In office 1974–1982
- Preceded by: Jim Robinson
- Succeeded by: T. M. Woodruff

Personal details
- Born: George F. Hieber II; December 28, 1942 Pittsburgh, Pennsylvania, U.S.
- Died: November 23, 1996 (aged 53)
- Party: Republican
- Education: Florida State University; Stetson Law School; Cumberland Law School; University of South Florida

George F. Hieber II (December 28, 1942 – November 23, 1996) was an American politician. He served as a Republican member for the 58th district of the Florida House of Representatives.

== Life and career ==
Hieber was born in Pittsburgh, Pennsylvania. He attended Florida State University, Stetson Law School, Cumberland Law School and the University of South Florida.

In 1974, Hieber was elected to represent the 58th district of the Florida House of Representatives, succeeding Jim Robinson. He served until 1982, when he was succeeded by T. M. Woodruff.

Hieber died on November 23, 1996, at the age of 53.
