= 1998 Florida Secretary of State election =

1998 election in Florida

- November 3, 1998
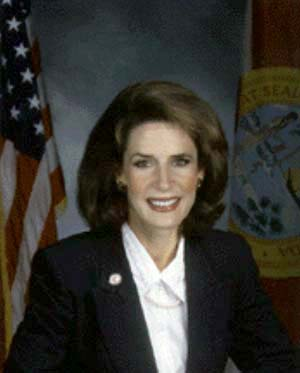

Nominee	Katherine Harris	Karen Gievers
Party	Republican	Democratic
Popular vote	2,065,313	1,778,924
Percentage	53.72%	46.28%
- County results Harris: 50–60% 60–70% 70–80% Gievers: 50–60% 60–70%
Secretary of State before election
Sandra Mortham
Republican
Elected Secretary of State
Katherine Harris
Republican

The 1998 Florida Secretary of State election was held on November 3, 1998, to elect the Secretary of State of Florida. Republican incumbent Sandra Mortham ran for re-election but was defeated in the primary by Florida state senator Katherine Harris. Harris won the general election, defeating Democratic nominee and attorney Karen Gievers by four percentage points. This was the last election held to elect the Secretary of State of Florida as a 1998 voter referendum would change it to an appointed position.

== Republican primary ==
=== Candidates ===
- Katherine Harris, Florida state senator (1994–1998)
- Sandra Mortham, incumbent Secretary of State of Florida (1995–1999)

=== Results ===
Republican primary results
Party	Candidate	Votes	%
Republican	Katherine Harris	358,457	61.44%
Republican	Sandra Mortham	224,969	38.56%
Total votes		583,426	100.00%

== General election ==
=== Candidates ===
- Katherine Harris, Florida state senator (1994–1998) (Republican)
- Karen Gievers, attorney (Democratic)

=== Results ===
1998 Florida Secretary of State election results
Party	Candidate	Votes	%	±%
Republican	Katherine Harris	2,065,313	53.72%	+1.35%
Democratic	Karen Gievers	1,778,924	46.28%	−1.35%
Total votes		3,844,237	100.00%	
Republican hold				
