= Russian–Venezuelan Threat Mitigation Act =

Bill of the United States Congress responding to the 2019 Venezuelan Presidential Crisis

- Long title: A Bill to require a threat assessment and strategy to counter Russian influence in Venezuela, an assessment of foreign acquisition of CITGO assets in the United States, and for other purposes.
- Announced in: the 116th United States Congress
- Number of co-sponsors: 8

Legislative history
- Introduced in the House of Representatives as H.R. 1477 by Debbie Wasserman Schultz (D–FL) on February 28, 2019; Committee consideration by Foreign Affairs and Judiciary; Passed the House on March 25, 2019 (Passed without vote)

The Russian–Venezuelan Threat Mitigation Act is a bill in the 116th United States Congress sponsored by Rep. Debbie Wasserman Schultz (D-FL) and co-sponsored by Mario Díaz-Balart (R-FL), Donna Shalala (D-FL), and Debbie Mucarsel-Powell (D-FL). It aims to monitor and investigate Russia's increasing involvement in the 2019 Venezuelan presidential crisis and the crisis in Venezuela in general.

The bill was introduced to the House as H.R. 1477 on February 28, 2019, and passed by the House of Representatives on March 25, 2019. The bill would need to pass the Senate and be signed by the President of the United States in order to become law. On 8 April, it was referred to a Senate subcommittee.

== Introduction ==
Congresswoman Debbie Wasserman Schultz said the bill was introduced because of Russia's menacing influence that prevents the restoration of a functioning democracy in Venezuela while posing an imminent military threat to the United States and the entire Western Hemisphere.

In December 2018, the Russian military sent two Tupolev Tu–160 nuclear-capable bombers to Venezuela for joint military exercises, which carry conventional or nuclear-tipped cruise missiles with an estimated maximum range of around 3,000 miles. At the same time, both Russian and Venezuelan forces took part in a joint 10-hour exercise across the Caribbean Sea with the Tu–160 aircraft.

In a 2016 deal, Venezuela offered Russia 49.9% of Citgo as collateral for a $1.5 billion loan. Due to the poor state of Venezuela's economy, which includes a high risk of default, it is possible the Bolivarian Government of Venezuela may give Citgo to Rosneft, Russia's government-run oil company. Both Republican and Democratic politicians in the United States urged oversight on this deal, describing Citgo's sale to Russia as a risk to the national security of the United States. In December 2018, it was suggested that Rosneft has lent PDVSA for $6.5 billion partly as prepayment for crude oil, of which $3.1 billion remained outstanding as of the end of September 2018.

The bill also mentioned that during the 2019 Venezuelan presidential crisis, Russia has provided financial support for President Maduro while countering international support for interim president Juan Guaidó. Moreover, it was reported in that Russia sent Wagner Group contractors to provide security and protection for Maduro, a charge which Russia denies.

Congresswoman Schultz said that the bill takes a critical step toward understanding and addressing the impact of Russia-Venezuela military cooperation, and to ensure it does not obstruct democracy or safety in the region while preventing Russia "to outfit Maduro with weapons of oppression." Co-sponsor Mario Díaz-Balart said the bill was necessary to monitor Russia's threat to stability and democracy within the Western hemisphere, explaining that the Maduro regime "has invited adversaries such as Russia and China into its doorstep."

== Proposals ==
Under the bill, it requires the US State Department to provide a threat assessment and strategic approach for dealing with Russia's growing military sway in Venezuela. It also requires the President of the United States to monitor the risk of Russian acquisition of the Venezuela's CITGO assets in the United States.

The bill also imposes a travel ban on individuals working on behalf of the Russian government in direct support of Venezuelan security forces, which includes the following agencies:

- National Bolivarian Armed Forces of Venezuela (FANB)
- Bolivarian National Guard (GNB)
- Bolivarian National Intelligence Service (SEBIN)
- Bolivarian National Police (PNB)
- Scientific, Penal, and Criminal Investigation Service Corps (CICPC)
- Ministry of Interior, Justice, and Peace (MPPIJ)

== Reactions ==
Russian Foreign Ministry spokeswoman Maria Zakharova said the bill would not make Russia reverse its diplomatic stance on the crisis in Venezuela and its support to Nicolás Maduro by increasing more sanctions on Russia.

Oleg Morozov, member of the Federation Council's Foreign Affairs Committee described the bill as "nonsense" and an anti-Russian sanctions policy.

According to Russia's ambassador to Venezuela, Vladimir Zaemsky, the Russian government is ready to respond by imposing similar measures should the bill pass.

== See also ==
- Magnitsky Act
- Venezuela Defense of Human Rights and Civil Society Act of 2014
- Countering America's Adversaries Through Sanctions Act
- Defending American Security from Kremlin Aggression Act
- Venezuela TPS Act of 2019
- Responses to the 2019 Venezuelan presidential crisis
