= Stinkytoons =

Animated cartoon created by Mark Greene

Stinkytoons is the brand name for a series of animated cartoons created by New York animator Mark Greene. Stinkytoons stars Stinky, the Nasty Little Office Man, as well as a second character, Flossie the Pubic Hair. In 2007, Greene's company, Pecos Pictures won the Public Service Broadband Emmy Award for its Stinkytoons cartoon "Big Fun With Global Warming". The cartoon was licensed by the Sierra Club's web site along with a second cartoon "Stinky Gets Gas."

Greene also created the mockumentary entitled "The Rejected Katherine Harris Campaign Video" which won the HuffingtonPost.com's Contagious Festivals People's Choice and Jury Prize. This mock up of Congresswoman Katherine Harris' 2006 Senate Campaign received over 75,000 hits during the 2006 election cycle and received coverage in the Florida Press. Harris failed to be elected.
