= Jeff Huenink =

American politician (born 1956)

Member of the Florida House of Representatives from the 58th district
- In office November 8, 1988 – November 3, 1992
- Preceded by: Tom Woodruff
- Succeeded by: Elvin Martinez (redistricted)

Personal details
- Born: June 14, 1956 (age 70) Chicago, Illinois
- Party: Republican
- Spouse: Colleen Donovan
- Children: 3
- Education: University of South Florida (B.A.)
- Occupation: Businessman

Jeffrey C. Huenink (born June 14, 1956) is a Republican politician and businessman from Florida who served as a member of the Florida House of Representatives from the 58th district from 1988 to 1992.

== Early life ==
Huenink was born in Chicago in 1956, and moved to Florida in 1974, where he attended the University of South Florida, graduating in 1998. He owned an industrial laundry equipment business and served as vice chairman of the Pinellas Sports Authority.

== Florida House of Representatives ==
In 1988, Huenink challenged incumbent State Representative Tom Woodruff in the Republican primary in the Florida House of Representatives from the 58th district, which included the northern suburbs of St. Petersburg in Pinellas County. He argued that the district "need[s] some effective leadership," and was joined in the primary by Safety Harbor City Commissioner Michael Baty. Huenink placed first in the primary, winning 41 percent of the vote to Woodruff's 35 percent and Baty's 24 percent, and he advanced to a runoff with Woodruff.

Though Huenink entered the runoff as the frontrunner, but Woodruff attacked him for changing his position on taxes and alleged that Huenink solicited support from the Church of Scientology, which Huenink dismissed as "lies by a desperate candidate." Huenink ultimately defeated Woodruff by a wide margin, winning 61 percent of the vote to his 39 percent. Because no other candidates filed, he won the general election unopposed.

Huenink was re-elected without opposition in 1990.

== 1992 State Senate campaign ==
In 1992, rather than seek re-election to the State House, Huenink instead ran for the Florida Senate from the 20th district, which included parts of St. Petersburg and Tampa. State Senator Helen Gordon Davis, a Democrat, ran for re-election in the district, and Huenink faced attorney Charlie Crist in the Republican primary. Crist defeated Huenink, winning 62 percent of the vote to Huenink's 38 percent.
