= Bryan G. Rudnick =

Bryan G. Rudnick, President and CEO of Alliance Strategies Group, is an American political public relations consultant, specializing in online marketing and rapid-response communications. He has been active in many conservative causes.

== Background ==
Rudnick is a graduate of Valley Forge Military Academy he later attended, Brandeis University (where he orchestrated the visit of National Rifle Association President Charlton Heston and was featured in a segment on The Daily Show related to the event.), and the National Journalism Center; he also completed coursework at The George Washington University's Graduate School of Political Management. He is a member of the Florida Direct Marketing Association, the Direct Marketing Association, the American Association of Political Consultants, the American Marketing Association, the Public Relations Society of America, and the Association of Former Intelligence Officers.

== Career ==
Rudnick has been featured in Human Events' "Conservative spotlight" for his help in founding Massachusetts Citizens for Marriage and his work with the anti-same-sex marriage movement in the state in 2001. During his tenure there, he was responsible for organizing a petition drive that collected more than 130,000 signatures in 90 days.

He served as campaign manager for Katherine Harris’ 2006 U.S Senate campaign.

After the November 2006 election, he was the National Communications Director for the Minuteman Civil Defense Corps, where he was as one of the architects for the successful strategy that defeated the Immigration Amnesty bill in June 2007.

In October 2008 he was part of the team that launched The ACORN Watch Report, an "investigative website dedicated to exposing those who jeopardize the integrity of our democratic process." He was quoted in a Fox News Channel article in November 2010, stating that the Association of Community Organizations for Reform Now's bankruptcy filing is a "shell game" and that they are not disbanding, but "transforming". After the Republican defeat in November 2008, he launched the website POTUS45.com to encourage Sarah Palin to run for President of the United States in the 2012 election.

In July 2009 he brought national attention to a kiosk owner whose lease was not being renewed by a Simon Malls property in Concord Mills, North Carolina.

In 2009 he consulted for the Earl Sholley campaign, in which he is running for the second time for the U.S. Congress against Barney Frank in Massachusetts's 4th congressional district on email fund-raising and social media. He also consulted for the Doug Hoffman for Congress campaign on email fund-raising and for the Curt Price for Congress campaign..

In September 2009 he launched Brand Management 2.0, a website that "works with SMBs, cottage industries, non-profit organizations, political campaigns, and Fortune 1000 companies who need an active presence on 5 to 350 different social platforms."

== Controversy ==
During the 2008 Presidential campaign, he was hired as a strategist by the Pennsylvania Republican Party. He was responsible for an email to Jewish voters that equated a vote for Obama with the "tragic mistake" of those, who "ignored the warning signs in the 1930s and 1940s". The party fired him, claiming he issued this without their authorization, but Rudnick stated that the message had been authorized by party leaders.

During the petition drive he conducted for the 2002 marriage initiative, the Massachusetts Attorney General issued a press release warning citizens about the possible “bait and switch” tactics being implemented during the petition gathering process. The issue was later dropped by the Attorney General, but was cited in the legislature's Joint Committee on Public Service official committee report opposing the measure.
