= John Quiñones (politician) =

Puerto Rico-born politician (born 1965)

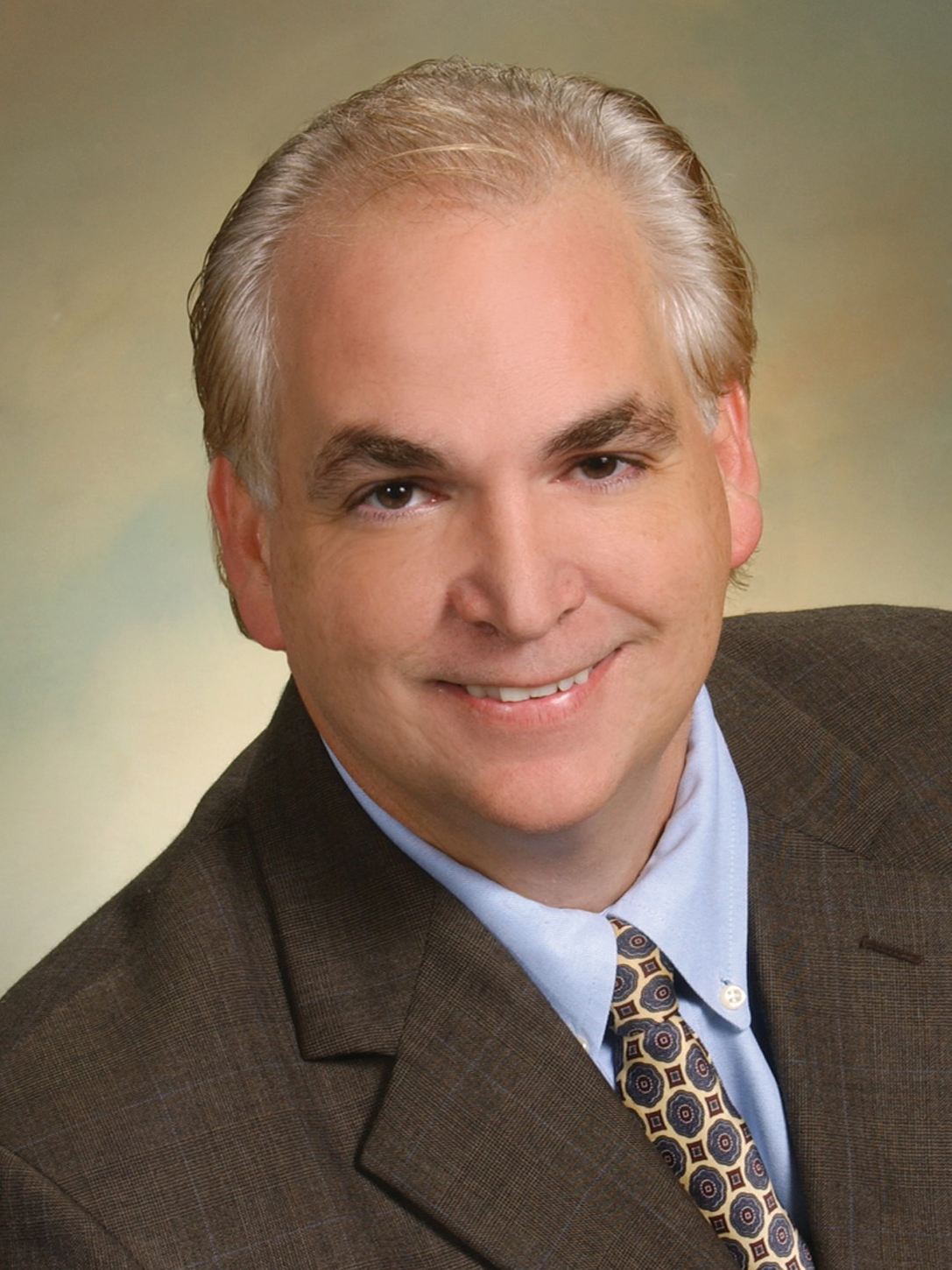

Member of the Florida House of Representatives from the 49th district
- In office November 2002 – February 1, 2007
- Preceded by: Larry Crow
- Succeeded by: Darren Soto

Personal details
- Born: April 26, 1965 (age 61) Río Piedras, Puerto Rico, U.S.
- Party: Republican
- Education: University of Central Florida (BS); St. Thomas University (JD)

John P. Quiñones IV (born April 26, 1965) is an American politician. He was the first Republican of Puerto Rican ancestry elected to the Florida House of Representatives, serving from 2002 to 2007, and is a former member of the Osceola County Commission.

== Education ==
He received his Bachelor of Science degree from the University of Central Florida in 1988, and his Juris Doctor degree from St. Thomas University in Opa-locka in 1992.

== Political career ==
Quiñones, who was elected in 2002, represented the 49th district of the state, which stretches between Osceola and Orange counties. On February 1, 2007 he resigned his seat in order to concentrate on a run for a newly created seat on the Osceola County Commission. His campaign was successful and he was reelected in 2010.

In April 2012, he announced that he would be running for the Republican nomination to represent Florida's 9th congressional district in the United States House of Representatives. He came second in the primary with 7,514 votes (28.26%). Attorney Todd Long won the primary with 12,585 votes (47.33%), Julius A. Melendez came third with 3,983 votes (14.98%) and Mark Oxner came last with 2,510 votes (9.44%). Long went on to lose the general election to Democrat Alan Grayson in a landslide.

Quiñones ran in the 2024 United States House of Representatives elections in Florida in Florida's 9th congressional district, occupied by incumbent Democratic Rep. Darren Soto.

== Personal life ==
He resides in Kissimmee with his two children, Natalia and Alexander.

Florida House of Representatives
Preceded by Larry Crow	Member of the Florida House of Representatives from the 49th district 2002–2007	Succeeded by Darren Soto
