= Peter R. Wallace =

American politician in Florida (born 1954)

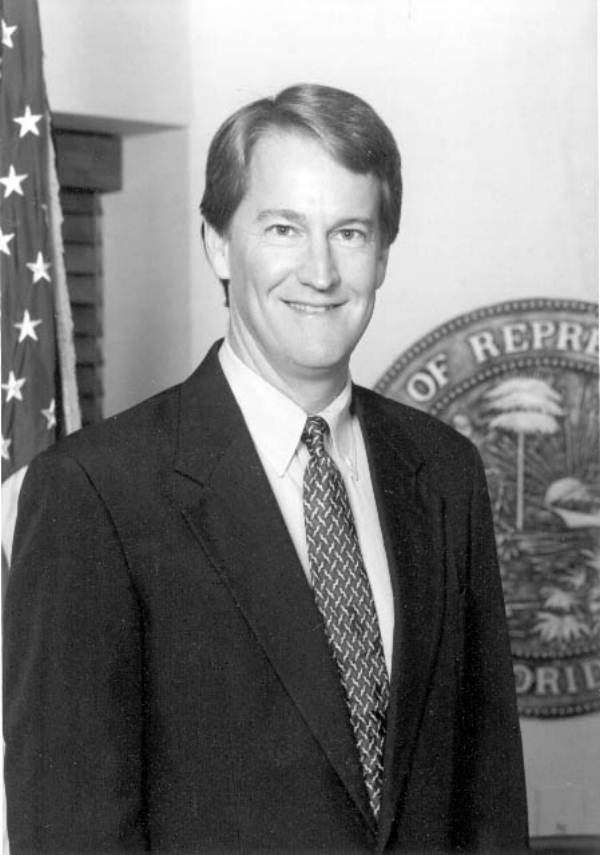

88th Speaker of the Florida House of Representatives
- In office November 22, 1994 – November 5, 1996
- Preceded by: Bolley Johnson
- Succeeded by: Daniel Webster

Member of the Florida House of Representatives
- In office November 2, 1982 – November 5, 1996
- Preceded by: George Hieber (redistricting)
- Succeeded by: Margo Fischer
- Constituency: 56th district (1982–1992); 52nd district (1992–1996)

Personal details
- Born: April 13, 1954 (age 72)
- Party: Democratic
- Spouse: Helen Wallace
- Children: 2
- Relatives: Henry Cantwell Wallace (great-grandfather)
- Profession: Attorney

Peter Rudy Wallace (born April 13, 1954) is an American politician and attorney who served as Speaker of the Florida House of Representatives from 1994 to 1996. A member of the Democratic Party, he served in the Florida House of Representatives from 1982 to 1996 and was the last Democrat to serve as speaker, as of 2025.

== Early life and education ==
Peter Rudy Wallace was born on April 13, 1954, to Martha Rudy and John Powell Wallace. He has four brothers, two younger and two older.

His father was also a Democrat and an executive in the egg and poultry industry who founded the Wallace Hatchery and Wallace Chicks and was the first Chairman of the American Egg Board. His mother was a Republican who served on the Pinellas County School Board from 1972 to 1980.

His great-uncle Henry A. Wallace was the 33rd Vice President of the United States, his great-grandfather Henry Cantwell Wallace was the 7th United States Secretary of Agriculture, his grandfather Merle F. Rudy founded the Pinellas County Republican Party, and his aunt, Sally C. Wallace, served on the St. Petersburg City Council from 1976 to 1985.

Wallace graduated from Harvard College with an A.B. in 1976 and with a J.D. in 1979. After graduating, he clerked for Judge Paul Hitch Roney on the United States Court of Appeals for the Fifth Circuit from 1979 to 1980.

== Political career ==
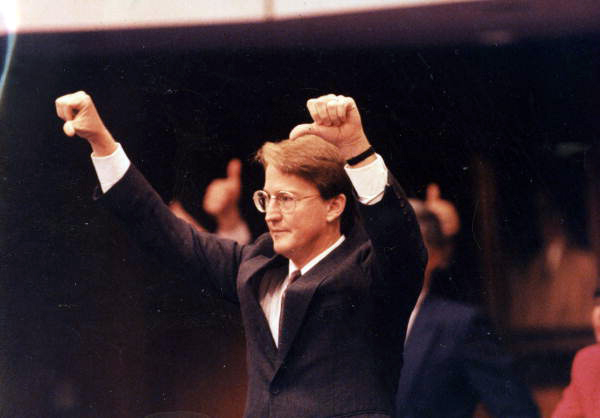
Peter Rudy Wallace (photograph by Donn Dughi)

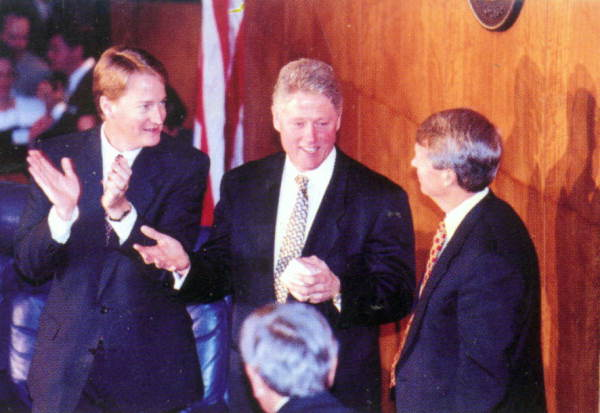
Wallace with President Bill Clinton and Senate President James A. Scott in 1995

Wallace was first elected to the Florida House of Representatives in 1982 from the 56th district. He challenged incumbent Republican State Representative George Hieber, and defeated him by 53% to 47%. He comfortably defeated Richard B. Badgley in 1984 by 58% to 42% and was then re-elected unopposed in 1986, 1988 and 1990. In 1992, following redistricting, he ran for re-election in the 52nd district and easily defeated R.J. Lonergan Jr. by 63% to 37%. He was re-elected unopposed in 1994 and was also elected to serve as Speaker of the House that year, a race he had lost in 1989.

He was the last in an unbroken line of Democrats to serve as Speaker that stretched back to 1885. To date, he is the most recent Democrat to serve as Speaker: the House has been controlled by the Republicans ever since.

Wallace did not run for re-election in 1996. In 1998, he ran for Florida Commissioner of Education. He finished second in the Democratic primary with 180,855 votes (33.46%). Former Republican Palm Beach County Commissioner Ron Howard came first with 213,366 votes (39.48%) and State Representative J. Keith Arnold came third with 146,271 votes (27.06%). In the runoff, Wallace defeated Howard by 119,842 votes (56.25%) to 93,216 votes (43.75%). In the general election, Wallace lost to former Treasurer, Insurance Commissioner and Fire Marshal Tom Gallagher by 2,185,027 votes (56.54%) to 1,679,893 votes (43.47%).

== Later career ==
Wallace subsequently retired from politics and resumed the practice of law. Since 2000, he has been a partner in the St. Petersburg-based Skelton, Willis & Wallace. He has resisted overtures to return to politics. In 2009, he turned down the opportunity to run for the 16th district of the Florida Senate. In 2013, he declined to run for Florida's 13th congressional district after the Republican incumbent Bill Young announced his retirement.

== Personal life ==
Wallace is married to Helen Wallace (née Pruitt), daughter of Frances Miller McSwain and John Crayton Pruitt Sr., a cardio-vascular surgeon. She is a professor of creative writing at Eckerd College and they have two children, Daniel McSwain Wallace and Hannah Rudy Wallace.

Party political offices
Preceded by Doug Jamerson	Democratic nominee for Education Commissioner of Florida; 1998	Succeeded by George Sheldon
