= Dan Miller (Florida politician) =

American politician (born 1942)

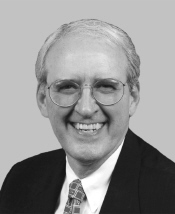

Member of the U.S. House of Representatives from Florida's 13th district
- In office January 3, 1993 – January 3, 2003
- Preceded by: Constituency established
- Succeeded by: Katherine Harris

Personal details
- Born: Frederick Daniel Miller; May 30, 1942 (age 84) Highland Park, Michigan, U.S.
- Party: Republican
- Spouse: Glenda Burton Darsey (m. 1968)
- Children: 2
- Education: University of Florida (BS); Emory University (MBA); Louisiana State University (PhD)

Frederick Daniel Miller (born May 30, 1942) is an American politician from the state of Florida. A Republican, he represented the state and its 13th district in the House of Representatives for ten years.

== Early life and career ==
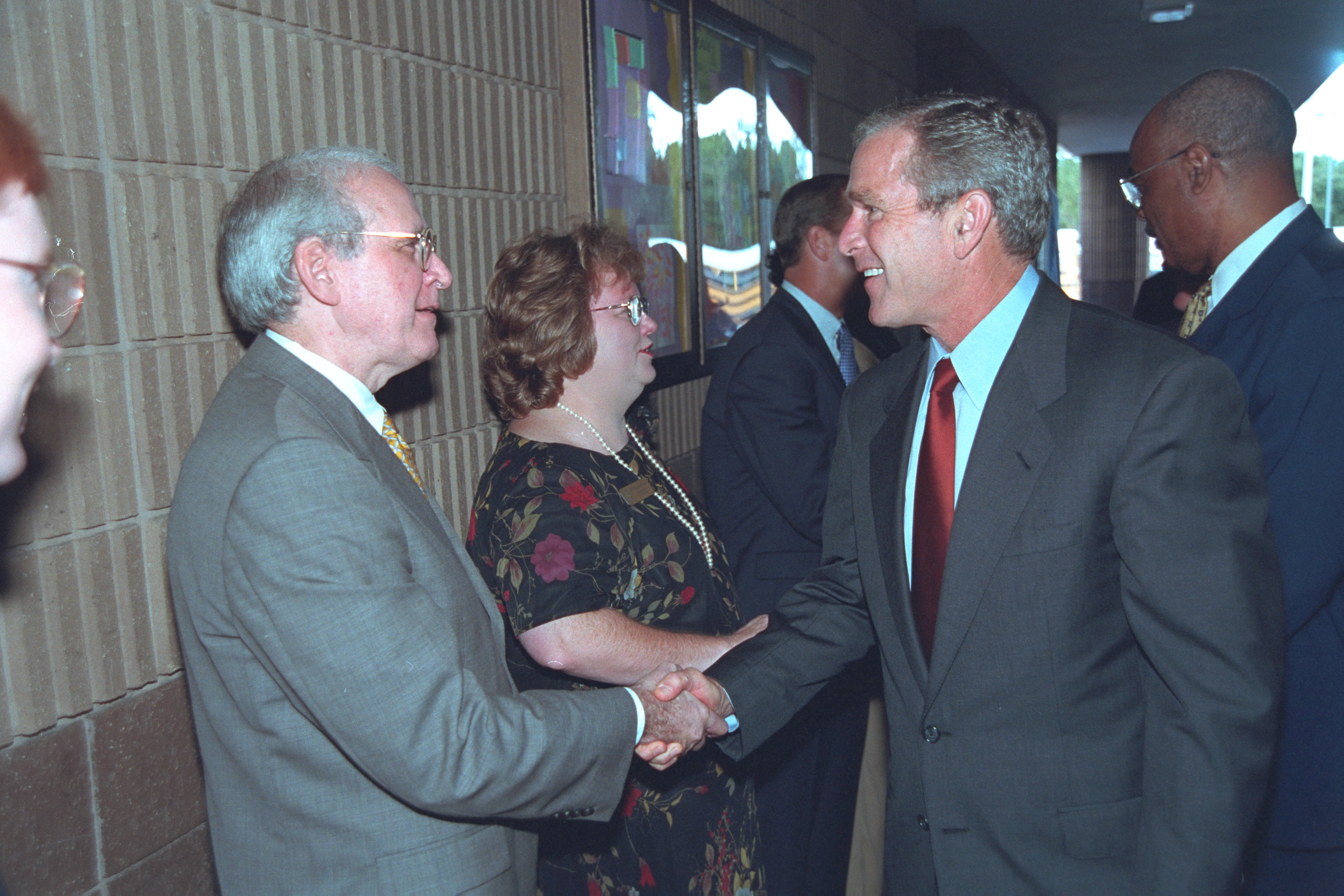
Miller greeting George W. Bush at his elementary school visit on 11 September

Miller was born in Highland Park, Michigan, but moved to Florida during his childhood and graduated from Manatee High School in Bradenton, Florida, in 1960. He was an undergraduate at the University of Florida, Gainesville, and received his MBA from Emory University. He then got his Ph.D. and served as a professor at several colleges across the South. He also developed a successful business career, working with his father Don Sr. and brother Don Jr. on a restaurant, nursing home and real estate development. He married Glenda Burton Darsey in Baton Rouge, Louisiana, on December 14, 1968. In 1992, Miller ran for Congress in Florida's 13th congressional district, a newly created district that included all of Manatee and Sarasota Counties, along with the southern portion of Hillsborough and a sliver of Charlotte.

Miller was elected to the U.S. House from the Republican-leaning district and served for the following ten years. He decided not to run for re-election in 2002, honoring his self-imposed term limit of 10 years. Florida Secretary of State Katherine Harris was elected to succeed him.

In Congress, Miller advocated spending restraint as a fiscal conservative. He served on several committees during his tenure, including Appropriations, Government Reform & Oversight, and Budget. Miller championed Medicare reform, fought to end the costly sugar subsidy, and opposed earmarking. Miller also served as chairman of the subcommittee on the United States Census, overseeing the 2000 decennial census, a position he was uniquely qualified to hold as a former statistics professor.

== Electoral history ==
Florida's 13th congressional district: Results 1992–2000
Year	Democrat	Votes	Pct	Republican	Votes	Pct
1992	Rand Snell	115,767	42%	Dan Miller	158,881	58%
1994	(no candidate)			Dan Miller	*	
1996	Sanford Gordon	96,098	36%	Dan Miller	173,671	64%
1998	(no candidate)			Dan Miller	*	
2000	Daniel E. Dunn	99,568	36%	Dan Miller	175,918	64%

*Write-in and minor candidate notes: In 1994 and 1998, Miller was unopposed, and so a vote total was not recorded. In 1996, write-ins received 135 votes. In 2000, write-ins received 101 votes.

U.S. House of Representatives
Preceded by Porter Goss	Member of the U.S. House of Representatives from Florida's 13th congressional district 1993–2003	Succeeded by Katherine Harris
U.S. order of precedence (ceremonial)
Preceded by Dan Mica as Former U.S. Representative	Order of precedence of the United States as Former U.S. Representative	Succeeded by Karen Thurman as Former U.S. Representative
