= Darren Soto =

American attorney & politician (born 1978)

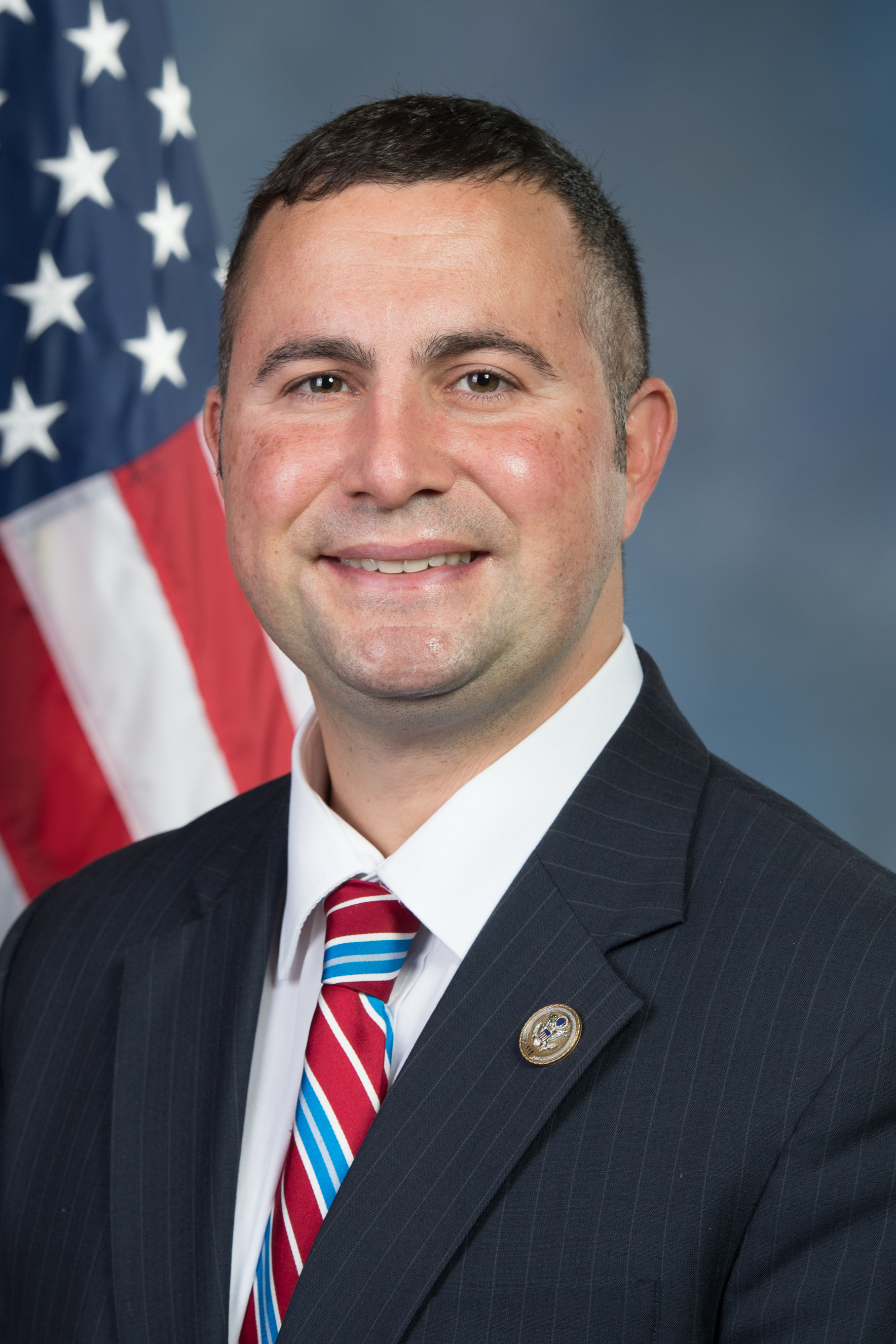
- Official portrait, 2017

Member of the U.S. House of Representatives from Florida's 9th district
- Incumbent
- Assumed office January 3, 2017
- Preceded by: Alan Grayson

Member of the Florida Senate from the 14th district
- In office November 6, 2012 – November 8, 2016
- Preceded by: Steve Oelrich
- Succeeded by: Vic Torres (redistricting)

Member of the Florida House of Representatives from the 49th district
- In office April 24, 2007 – November 6, 2012
- Preceded by: John Quiñones
- Succeeded by: Vic Torres (redistricting)

Personal details
- Born: Darren Michael Soto; February 25, 1978 (age 48) Ringwood, New Jersey, U.S.
- Party: Democratic
- Spouses: Amanda Betlow (m. 2013; div. 2024); Sheyla Asencios (m. 2026)
- Education: Rutgers University, New Brunswick (BA); George Washington University (JD)
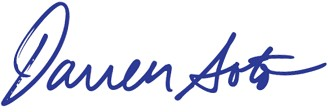
- Signature
- Website: House website Campaign website

Darren Michael Soto (/ˈsoʊtoʊ/ SOH-toe; born February 25, 1978) is an American attorney and politician serving as the U.S. representative for Florida's 9th congressional district since 2017. A member of the Democratic Party, he previously represented the 49th district in the Florida House of Representatives from 2007 to 2012 and the 14th district in the Florida Senate from 2012 to 2016, representing parts of Central Florida.

== Early life and education ==
Soto was born in Ringwood, New Jersey, to a Puerto Rican father, O. Lou Soto, and an Italian-American mother, Jean Soto. He attended Lakeland Regional High School, and then got his Bachelor of Arts degree from Rutgers University and his Juris Doctor from George Washington University.

== Florida House of Representatives ==
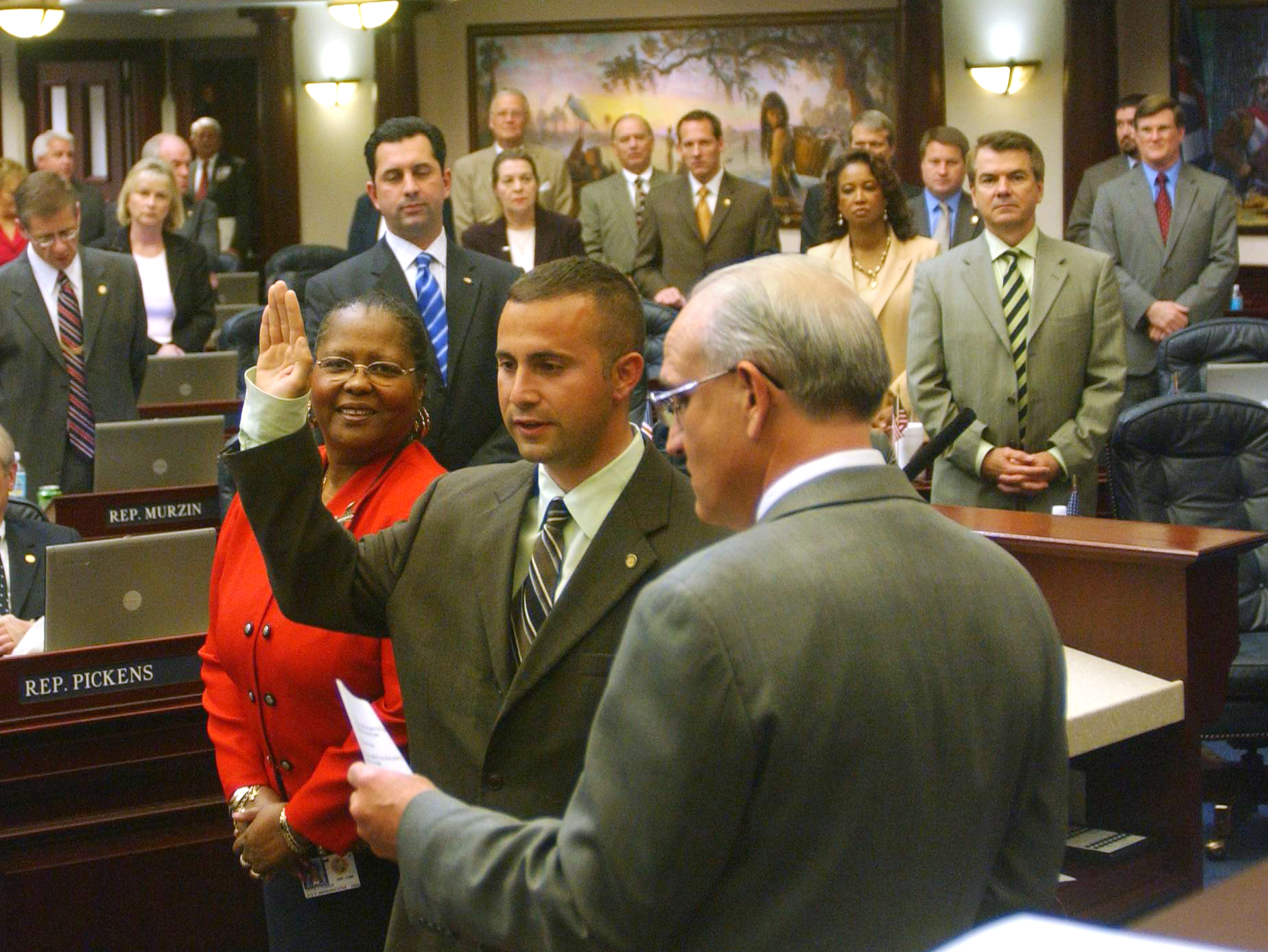
Soto is sworn in to the Florida House of Representatives in 2007

In 2006, Soto ran for the Florida House of Representatives from the 40th district, unsuccessfully challenging Republican incumbent Andy Gardiner.

In April 2007, he won the crowded Democratic primary in a special election for the Florida House of Representatives from the 49th district to replace Republican incumbent John Quinones, who had resigned to run for the Osceola County Commission. In the general election, Soto defeated former State Representative Anthony Suarez, the Republican nominee, with 52 percent of the vote. Soto was overwhelmingly reelected in 2008 and 2010.

During his three terms in the Florida House, Soto supported laws to curb illegal street racing, passed the “John C Curry” Firefighter Death Benefit Act to protect families of fallen firefighters who died in training exercises, and the Bus Driver Notification Act to help school bus safety.

== Florida Senate ==
In 2012, Florida Senate districts were redrawn, and Soto opted not to run for reelection in the House but instead to run for the newly created 14th Senate district, which included predominantly Latino areas of Orange, Osceola, and Polk Counties. He won his party's nomination uncontested and defeated Republican nominee Will McBride with over 70 percent of the vote.

In 2013, Soto proposed an amendment to require jury votes of 10 jurors rather than a majority of 7 for death penalties; the amendment did not pass. The following year, Soto led the Democratic House and Senate Caucuses in drafting a Congressional map during the 2014 Special Session on Redistricting.

During the 2015 legislative session, Soto helped secure $11.9 million in funding for Valencia College's Poinciana campus. He also successfully pushed for $20 million to restore the Kissimmee River. This earned him the Audubon Society of Florida's "Champion of the Everglades" award. He secured $10 million in Florida's budget to promote economic growth in Osceola County for a new facility to manufacture high-tech sensors, but Governor Scott vetoed the project.

In 2016, Soto helped steer funding to his district, including $15 million for the UCF Sensors Manufacturing Center, $12 million to complete the construction of the Poinciana Valencia College campus, $4 million in supplemental school construction money, $750,000 for the Northern Everglades and Lake Toho initiatives, and $150,000 for transition housing for veterans. He also supported that year Chloe's Law to construct barriers around water bodies adjacent to state roads, the Deaf Floridian's ID bill, and the Juvenile Clean Slate bill, which automatically sealed misdemeanor records for juveniles who reach 21 years of age and do not reoffend as adults.

== U.S. House of Representatives ==
=== Elections ===
==== 2016 ====
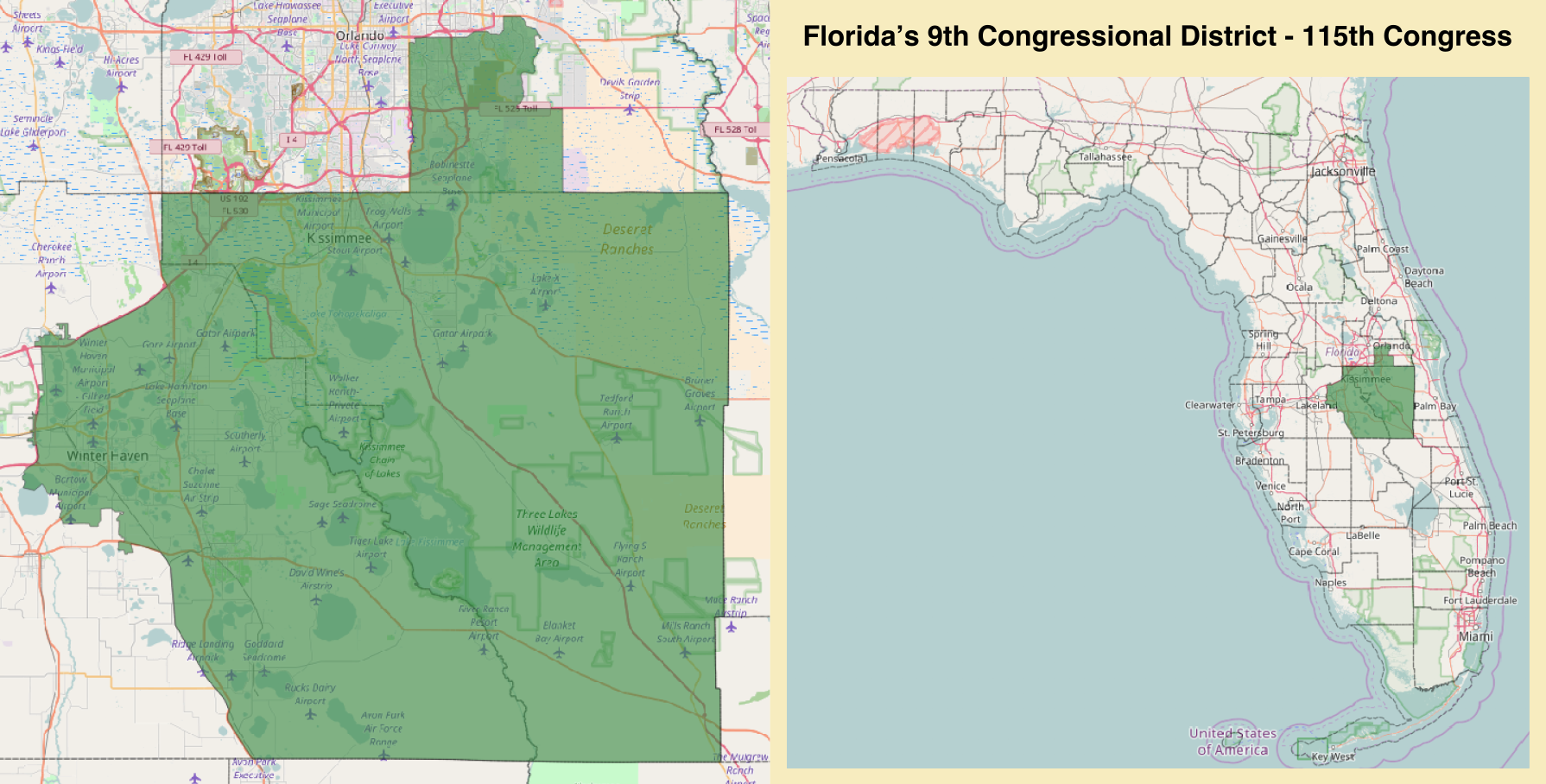
Florida's 9th congressional district (2017–2023)

In 2016, Soto won the Democratic nomination to succeed Representative Alan Grayson, who stepped down to run for U.S. Senate, in Florida's 9th congressional district. Soto earned 36% of the vote in a four-way primary election. The district is Democratic-leaning and contains all of Osceola County and parts of Orange and Polk counties. Soto represented the majority of this district while serving in the Florida House of Representatives and the Florida Senate. The Orlando Sentinel endorsed him in his primary race, calling him an "effective lawmaker". In the general election, Soto defeated Republican nominee Wayne Liebnitzky, 57%–43%.

==== 2018 ====
On August 28, 2018, Soto won the Democratic primary with 66% of the vote, defeating a challenge from Grayson.

On November 6, Soto won the general election, defeating Republican nominee Wayne Liebnitzky with 58% of the vote.

==== 2020 ====
Soto ran for a third term and was virtually unopposed in the Democratic primary, with only one challenger, who dropped out in October 2019. In the November 3 general election, he defeated Republican nominee Bill Olson with just over 56% of the vote.

==== 2022 ====
In 2022, Soto won his fourth term, running in the general election against Scotty Moore, whom he defeated with nearly 54% of the vote.

==== 2024 ====
Soto ran for a fifth term in 2024 against Republican Thomas Chalifoux, a former Osceola County School Board member whose campaign was backed by the National Republican Congressional Committee and was largely self-financed. Soto won the general election with approximately 55 percent of the vote, securing a fifth term in the House.

==== 2026 ====
Following Florida's adoption of a new congressional map in 2026, Soto announced that he would seek reelection in the redrawn 9th congressional district, despite the district becoming substantially more favorable to Republican candidates. Nearly 60 percent of the area in his existing district remained in the new district, which was extended south to include most of Okeechobee, Glades, Highlands and Indian River counties. The redistricting also divided the Central Florida Puerto Rican and Latino communities that had formed much of Soto's political base among several congressional districts. The Cook Partisan Voting Index shifted the district from D+4 to R+8, the largest partisan shift among Florida's 28 congressional districts under the new map.

=== Tenure ===
==== First term (2017–2019) ====
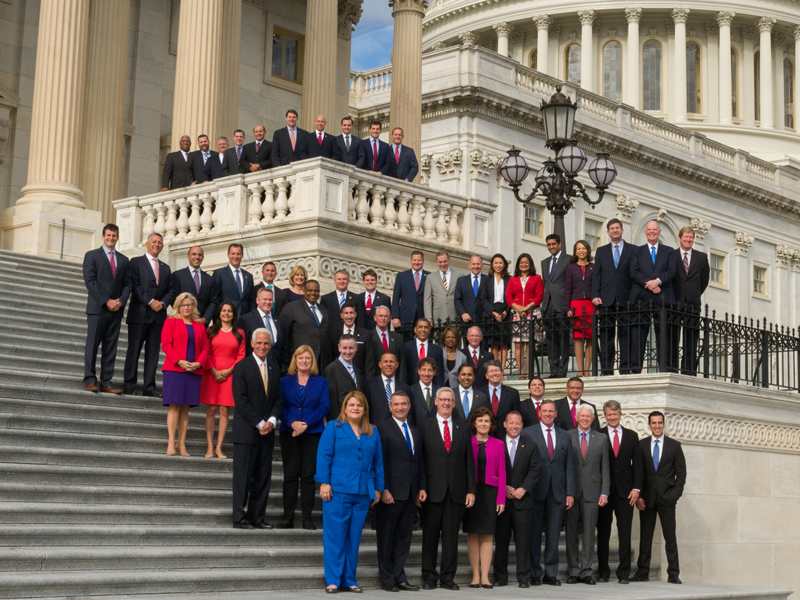
Soto in back stair row with the 115th Congress freshman class, 2017

Soto was sworn into the House of Representatives on January 3, 2017, representing Florida's 9th congressional district. He entered office as Republicans controlled the White House and both chambers of Congress. At the time of his election, he became the first member of Congress of Puerto Rican descent elected from Florida. During the 115th Congress, he served on the House Committees on Agriculture and Natural Resources and was appointed to the Democratic Steering and Policy Committee and as an assistant regional whip.

Working with Democratic Senator Bill Nelson, Soto passed his first law in Congress in April 2017 through the Weather Research and Forecasting Innovation Act of 2017. The act incorporated his Hurricane Hunters bill (H.R. 1008), which authorized the addition of two backup Hurricane Hunter aircraft to the National Oceanic and Atmospheric Administration (NOAA) fleet to increase hurricane monitoring and preparedness. Later that year, following Hurricane Irma, he co-signed a bipartisan letter requesting that the Federal Emergency Management Agency (FEMA) designate Orange, Osceola, Polk, Lake and Seminole counties for individual assistance. In December 2017, Soto and Republican Representative Carlos Curbelo secured the passage of the Foreign Spill Protection Act, which eliminated a $1 billion cap on damages for foreign oil drillers whose spills pollute U.S. waters.

In 2018, Soto advanced the Shark and Billfish Protection Act through the House Natural Resources Committee, while Nelson passed the Senate companion bill. The law, H.R. 4528, closed a loophole in the Billfish Conservation Act by making it illegal to sell billfish such as marlin, spearfish, and sailfish in the continental United States. It passed the House in June and was signed into law in August 2018. Later that year, Soto negotiated with the intercity rail operator Brightline on plans to connect its service with Central Florida's SunRail commuter rail system at Orlando International Airport. He tied for first among freshman members of the 115th Congress in laws enacted.

==== Second term (2019–2021) ====
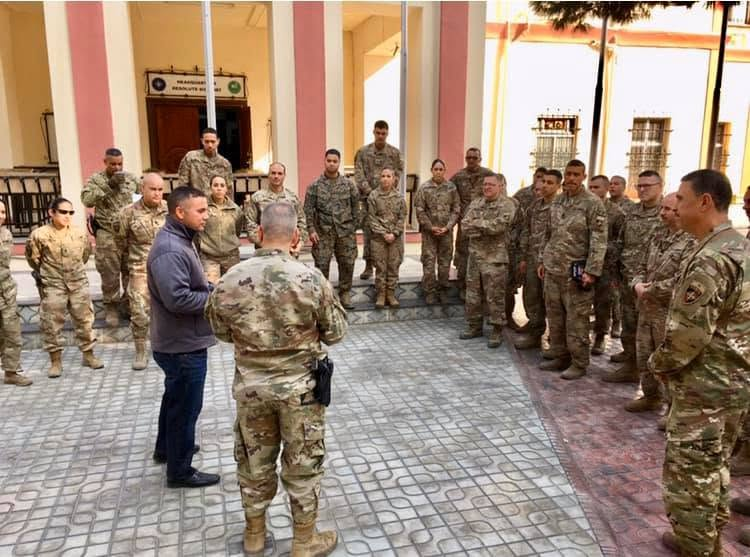
Soto visits military personnel at the start of the covid-19 pandemic in 2020

Following his reelection, Soto was appointed in 2019 to the House Committees on Natural Resources and Energy and Commerce. During his second term, he worked with Democratic Representatives Val Demings and Stephanie Murphy to renew federal grants to the Central Florida region, including more than $30 million for affordable housing and to prevent homelessness and $3.25 million for local anti-terrorism efforts. He also assisted in securing more than $3 million in federal grants for healthcare clinics in Osceola and Polk counties.

In June 2019, Soto secured passage of his first law of the 116th Congress, the Strengthening Mosquito Abatement for Safety and Health (SMASH) Act, which aimed to combat future mosquito-borne Zika virus outbreaks in Florida, Puerto Rico and other areas. The following month, he passed the Venezuela TPS Act of 2019 out of the House. Later that year, the House voted to impeach President Donald Trump, and Soto voted in favor of both articles of impeachment.

During the COVID-19 pandemic, Soto helped Florida's delegation in securing additional supplies of remdesivir for the state. In May 2020, as Congress considered further pandemic relief, he voted for the HEROES Act, which passed the House. The legislation included his Save Our Homes Act, which helps homeowners save their homes from foreclosure by ending forbearance agreement balloon payments. The following month, Soto passed legislation out of the House designating the Pulse National Memorial in recognition of the 49 killed and 53 injured at the 2016 Pulse Nightclub shooting in Orlando, Florida. He introduced this bill with Representatives Val Demings and Stephanie Murphy.

==== Later terms (2021–present) ====
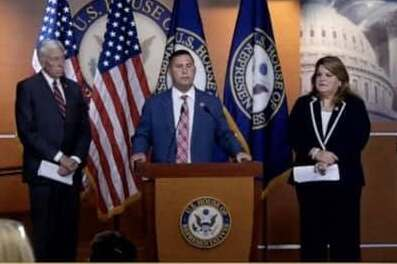
Soto introduces the Puerto Rico Status Act in 2022

Following Puerto Rico's 2020 status referendum, in which 52.5% of participating voters supported statehood, Soto and Puerto Rico Resident Commissioner Jenniffer González-Colón introduced the bipartisan Puerto Rico Statehood Admissions Act in March 2021. The legislation proposed a process for Puerto Rico to become a state following a federally authorized vote on admission. The bill received bipartisan support in the House but did not receive a Senate companion bill.

In 2022, Soto came under controversy for being a part of the "Blockchain Eight", a group of members of Congress that sought to curb SEC investigations into the cryptocurrency market, who also received substantial donations from the cryptocurrency industry, including from groups linked to Sam Bankman-Fried.

In December 2022, the 117th Congress approved legislation directing the Department of the Interior to study whether the Kissimmee River qualified for inclusion in the National Wild and Scenic Rivers System. The measure marked the first step toward a federal designation that Soto had pursued through multiple Congresses.

In 2025, Soto joined a bipartisan group of lawmakers in the 119th Congress in reintroducing the Medical Manufacturing, Economic Development, and Sustainability (MMEDS) Act, which proposed tax incentives and other incentives to encourage pharmaceutical and medical manufacturing in the United States, with a particular focus on Puerto Rico and other economically distressed communities.

In September 2026, he voted for a resolution which denounced socialism and the Democratic Socialists of America, and called for the passage of the SAVE America Act.

=== Committee assignments ===
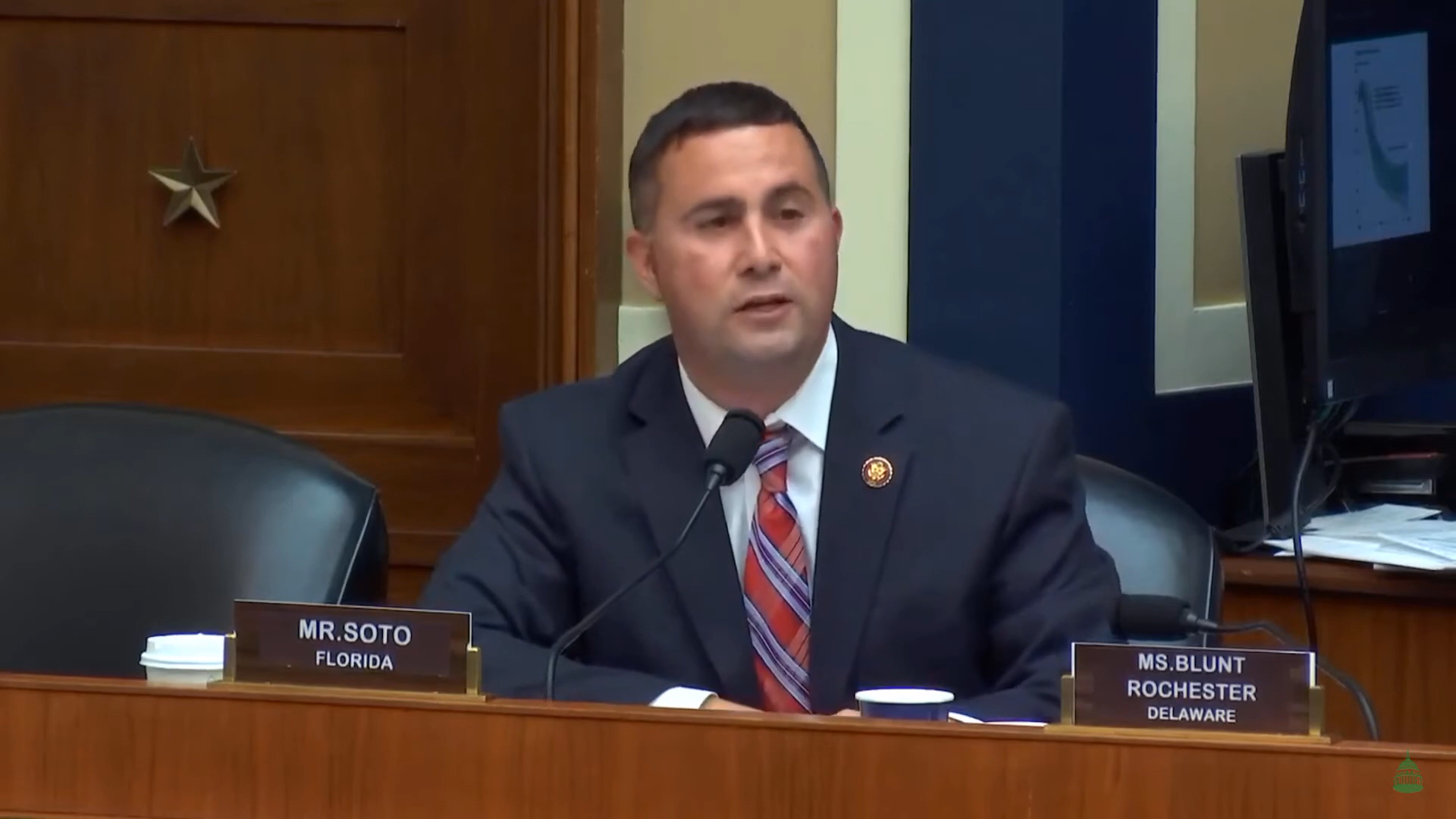
Soto on the Energy and Commerce Committee in 2019

For the 119th Congress:

- Committee on Natural Resources
  - Subcommittee on Water, Wildlife, and Fisheries
- Committee on Energy and Commerce
  - Subcommittee on Commerce, Manufacturing, and Trade
  - Subcommittee on Communications and Technology
  - Subcommittee on Environment

=== Caucus memberships ===
Soto's caucus memberships include:

- Future Forum
- New Democrat Coalition
- Congressional Hispanic Caucus (Deputy chair)
- Problem Solvers Caucus
- Congressional Progressive Caucus
- Congressional Equality Caucus (Vice chair)

== Political positions ==
=== Environmental policy ===
Soto received a perfect score of 100 for his environmental issues voting record from the National League of Conservation Voters in 2017. He introduced the Wild and Scenic River Study Act of 2017 (H.R.3961), which passed unanimously out of committee on January 17, 2018. On April 16, 2018, it passed unanimously out of the House. Soto helped lead opposition to Trump administration proposals to permit oil drilling off Florida's Gulf and Atlantic coasts during House Committee on Natural Resources meetings. He has also supported funding increases for the National Estuary Program the National Wildlife Refuge System program.

=== Gun control ===
Soto received an F rating from the NRA Political Victory Fund during his first term in Congress and supported numerous gun law reforms. On February 27, 2019, he voted for the Universal Background Check Bill. Soto received an A rating from the NRA in 2010, but his views changed after the 2012 Sandy Hook shooting. In the Florida Senate, he became a reliable vote for gun control, which ultimately led to earning a D rating from the NRA for his service there from 2013 to 2016.

After the 2016 Orlando nightclub shooting, Soto called for a special session to prevent those on the FBI's No Fly List from purchasing firearms. Since 2017, he has been a reliable vote for gun law reform. After the 2018 Stoneman Douglas High School shooting, he proposed a "Gun Safety Action Plan" with five steps: universal background checks for gun purchases, keeping guns away from those who are a danger to themselves or others, banning assault weapons and bump stocks, creating a "red-flag" system to issue gun restraining orders, and disallowing anyone on the federal terrorism no-fly list from buying a gun. Soto also said gun control would be "one of those litmus test issues" in the 2018 midterm elections.

=== Immigration ===
Soto supports the DREAM Act. In June 2018, he traveled with several Democratic members of Congress to Homestead, Florida, to tour a detention facility, where he argued against Trump's zero tolerance policy and the separation of children and families.

He was an advocate in Congress for Alejandra Juarez, the wife of an Iraq combat veteran and mother of two American daughters, who was deported to Mexico due to Trump's policy. "Zero tolerance literally ripped this family apart", Soto said. "The administration is so extreme on immigration that they're deporting the spouses of military veterans."

== Personal life ==
Soto is a singer, songwriter and guitarist for the Orlando folk rock band Orange Creek Riders, which has performed at events including the Orlando Fringe Festival, Planned Parenthood's Rock and Roe Concert, Delandapalooza, as well as various political events. The Orlando Weekly named Orange Creek Riders the "Best Congressional Folk Band" in its "Best Of" series. He also hosts a radio show and podcast, Rock and Politics, which combines discussion of political issues with related music.

On March 24, 2025, Soto announced that he was engaged to Sheyla Asencios. The two married on January 24, 2026 in Orlando. Soto was previously married to Amanda Betlow from 2013 until their divorce in 2024.

== Electoral results ==
2016 United States House of Representatives elections in Florida
Party	Candidate	Votes	%
Democratic	Darren Soto	195,311	57.48%
Republican	Wayne Liebnitzky	144,450	42.52%
Total votes		339,761	100.0
Democratic hold			

2018 United States House of Representatives elections in Florida
Party	Candidate	Votes	%
Democratic	Darren Soto (incumbent)	172,172	58.02%
Republican	Wayne Liebnitzky	124,565	41.98%
Total votes		296,737	100.0
Democratic hold			

2020 United States House of Representatives elections in Florida
Party	Candidate	Votes	%
Democratic	Darren Soto (incumbent)	240,724	56.02%
Republican	Bill Oslon	188,889	43.96%
Write-in	Clay Hill (write-in)	25	0.01%
Total votes		429,638	100.0
Democratic hold			

2022 United States House of Representatives elections in Florida
Party	Candidate	Votes	%
Democratic	Darren Soto (incumbent)	108,541	53.64%
Republican	Scotty Moore	93,827	46.36%
Total votes		202,368	100.0
Democratic hold			

2024 United States House of Representatives elections in Florida
Party	Candidate	Votes	%
Democratic	Darren Soto (incumbent)	178,785	55.13%
Republican	Thomas Chalifoux	138,076	42.58%
Independent	Marcus Carter	7,412	2.29%
Total votes		324,273	100.0
Democratic hold			

== See also ==
- List of Hispanic and Latino Americans in the United States Congress

U.S. House of Representatives
Preceded by Alan Grayson	Member of the U.S. House of Representatives from Florida's 9th congressional district 2017–present	Incumbent
U.S. order of precedence (ceremonial)
Preceded by Lloyd Smucker	United States representatives by seniority 178th	Succeeded by Ron Estes
