= Sandra Mortham =

American politician

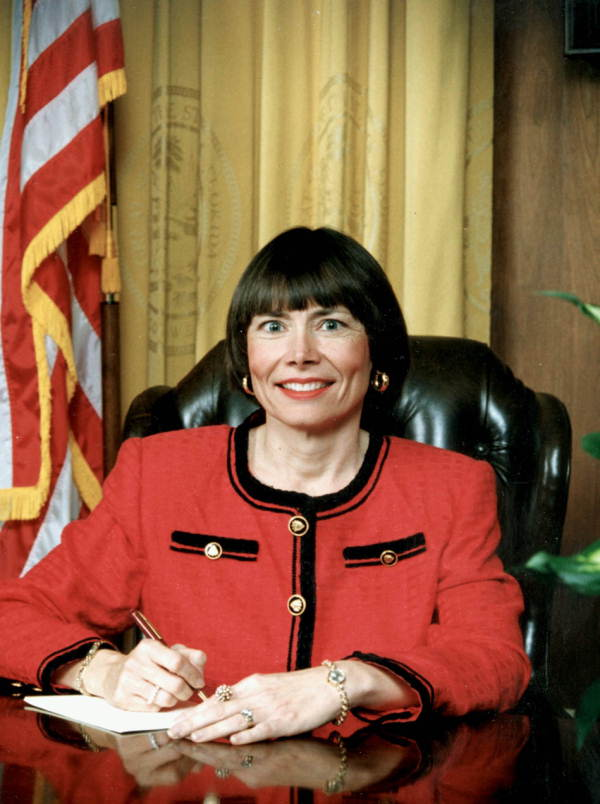

22nd Secretary of State of Florida
- In office January 3, 1995 – January 5, 1999
- Governor: Lawton Chiles
- Preceded by: James C. Smith
- Succeeded by: Katherine Harris

Member of the Florida House of Representatives
- In office November 4, 1986 – November 8, 1994
- Preceded by: Betty Easley
- Succeeded by: Larry Crow
- Constituency: 52nd district (1986–1992); 49th district (1992–1994)

Personal details
- Born: January 4, 1951 (age 75) Erie, Pennsylvania
- Party: Republican
- Education: St. Petersburg College, Eckerd College

Sandra Mortham (born January 4, 1951) is an American lobbyist and politician who served as the 22nd Florida Secretary of State from 1995 to 1999.

== Political career ==
Mortham was a City Commissioner from Largo, Florida from 1982 to 1986 also serving as Vice Mayor in 1985–86.

=== State legislature ===
She was a member of the Florida House of Representatives from 1987 to 1995 and was elected Republican Leader Pro Tempore in 1990-1992 and Republican Leader for the 1993-1994 legislative sessions. Mortham was the first woman in Florida's history to be nominated to be Speaker of the House.

=== Florida Secretary of State ===
She was the Secretary of State of Florida from 1995 to 1999. Mortham was defeated in the 1998 Republican primary by Katherine Harris, who shortly thereafter became embroiled in the controversy over the state’s handling of the vote counting in the decisive battle in the 2000 United States presidential election in Florida.

Party political offices
| Preceded by James C. Smith | Republican nominee for Secretary of State of Florida; 1994 | Succeeded by Katherine Harris |
Florida House of Representatives
| Preceded by Betty Easley | Member of the Florida House of Representatives from the 52nd district 1986–1992 | Succeeded by Peter Rudy Wallace |
| Preceded by Philip Mishkin | Member of the Florida House of Representatives from the 49th district 1992–1994 | Succeeded by Larry Crow |
Legal offices
| Preceded by James C. Smith | Secretary of State of Florida; 1995–1999 | Succeeded by Katharine Harris |
