= Betty Easley =

American politician (1929–1994)

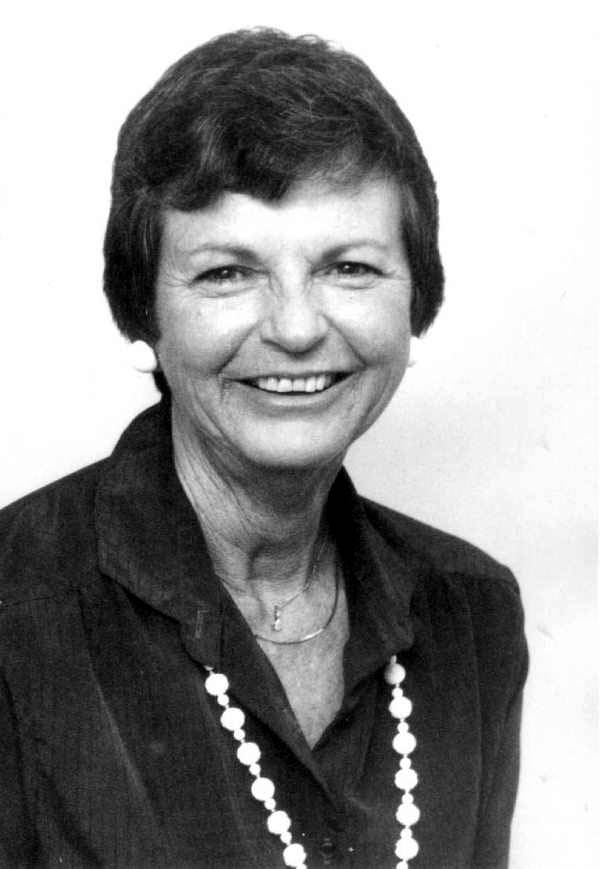

Member of the Florida Public Service Commission
- In office January 3, 1989 – January 5, 1993
- Governor: Bob Martinez; Lawton Chiles
- Preceded by: Katherine Cowles Nichols
- Succeeded by: Julia Johnson

Member of the Florida House of Representatives
- In office November 7, 1972 – November 4, 1986
- Preceded by: Dennis McDonald (redistricting)
- Succeeded by: Sandra Mortham
- Constituency: 56th district (1972–1982); 52nd district (1982–1986)

Personal details
- Born: August 5, 1929 Victoria, Texas
- Died: July 29, 1994 (aged 64) Tampa, Florida
- Party: Republican
- Spouse: Kenneth Easley
- Education: Eckerd College (B.A.); University of Texas
- Occupation: Homemaker

Betty Chapman Easley (August 5, 1929 – July 29, 1994) was a Republican politician from Florida who served as a member of the Florida House of Representatives from 1972 to 1986 and as a member of the Florida Public Service Commission from 1989 to 1993.

Easley was born in Victoria, Texas, in 1929, and moved to Florida in 1957. She was elected to the Florida House of Representatives from the 56th district in 1972, defeating incumbent State Representative Dennis McDonald in the Republican primary. She was re-elected in 1974, 1976, 1978, and 1980. In 1982, after redistricting, she won re-election in the 52nd district and was re-elected in 1984.

In 1986, Easley declined to run for re-election, and instead ran for Education Commissioner. However, she dropped out of the Republican primary and ran for Lieutenant Governor as the running mate of State Representative Tom Gallagher. They placed third in the primary, winning 24 percent of the vote to Tampa Mayor Bob Martinez's 44 percent and former Congressman Lou Frey's 25 percent, and narrowly missed the runoff election.

After Martinez was elected Governor, he appointed Easley to a four-year term on the Florida Public Service Commission in 1989. She served until 1993, when she was succeeded by Julia Johnson, who was appointed by Governor Lawton Chiles as her replacement.

Easley died of cancer on July 29, 1994.
