= Larry Crow =

American politician

Member of the Florida House of Representatives from the 49th district
- In office November 8, 1994 – November 5, 2002
- Preceded by: Sandra Mortham
- Succeeded by: Redistricted

Personal details
- Born: December 2, 1959 (age 66)
- Party: Republican
- Profession: Attorney (retired)

Larry Crow (born December 1959) is an American politician from the state of Florida.

Crow previously served in the Florida House of Representatives from 1995 to 2003. He currently lives in Palm Harbor, Florida, with his family.

He received his bachelor's degree from the University of South Florida and his J.D. from the University of Florida.

His affiliations while he served include the following: St. Petersburg Young Republicans (Past member from 1979 to 1982); Pinellas County Republican Executive Committee (1979-1980); Tarpon Springs Chamber of Commerce (Past member and board member); Tarpons Springs Kiwanis Club; Helen Ellis Memorial Hospital Planned Giving (committee past member).

Crow was a candidate for the United States House of Representatives in Florida's 13th congressional district, in a 2014 special election.

Florida House of Representatives
Preceded by Sandra Mortham	Member of the Florida House of Representatives from the 49th district 1994–2002	Succeeded by John Quiñones
