= Tom Woodruff =

American politician (born 1943)

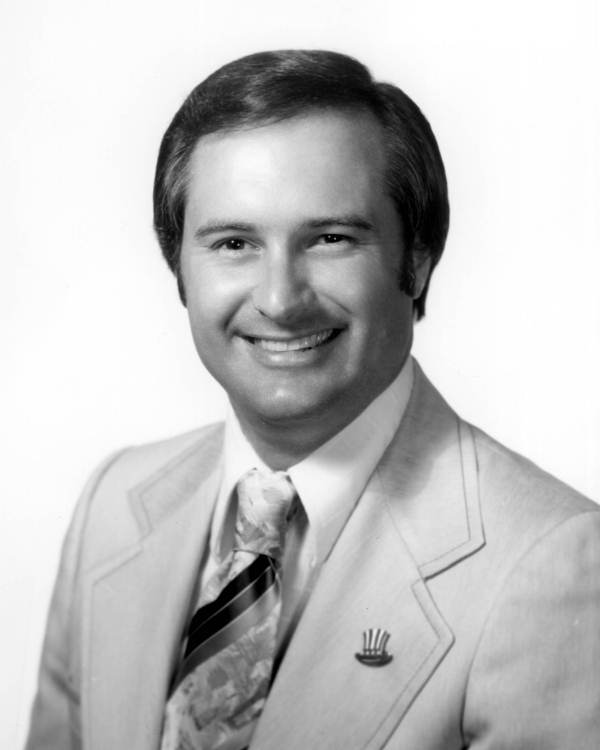

Member of the Florida House of Representatives
- In office November 2, 1976 – November 8, 1988
- Preceded by: Roger Wilson
- Succeeded by: Jeff Huenink
- Constituency: 60th district (1976–1982); 58th district (1982–1988)

Personal details
- Born: July 11, 1943 (age 83) Charlotte, North Carolina
- Party: Republican
- Spouse: Charlotte Peel
- Children: 3
- Education: Florida State University (B.S.); Cumberland School of Law (J.D.)
- Occupation: Attorney

Thomas M. Woodruff (born July 11, 1943) is a Republican politician and attorney from Florida who served as a member of the Florida House of Representatives from 1976 to 1988.

Woodruff was born in Charlotte, North Carolina in 1943 and moved to Florida in that same year with his family. He is a lawyer. He served in the Florida House of Representatives for the 58th district from 1976 to 1988, as a Republican.
