= Jim Robinson (Florida politician) =

American politician (1926–2020)

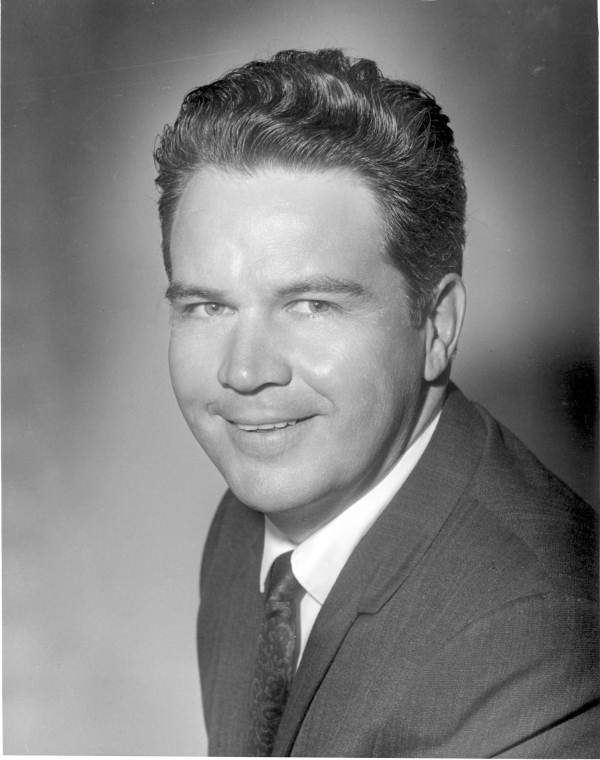

Member of the Florida House of Representatives from the 58th district
- In office 1966–1974

Personal details
- Born: November 14, 1926 St. Petersburg, Florida, U.S.
- Died: September 29, 2020 (aged 93)
- Party: Republican
- Spouse: Jeanne Arlee Crow
- Children: 3
- Education: Cornell University, University of Florida, University of Tampa
- Occupation: insurance agent

Alan Stuart Robinson (November 14, 1926 – September 29, 2020), better known as Jim Robinson, was an American politician in the state of Florida. He served in the Florida House of Representatives from 1966 to 1974, representing the 58th district. Robinson died on September 29, 2020, at the age of 93.
