= Katherine Harris =

American politician (born 1957)

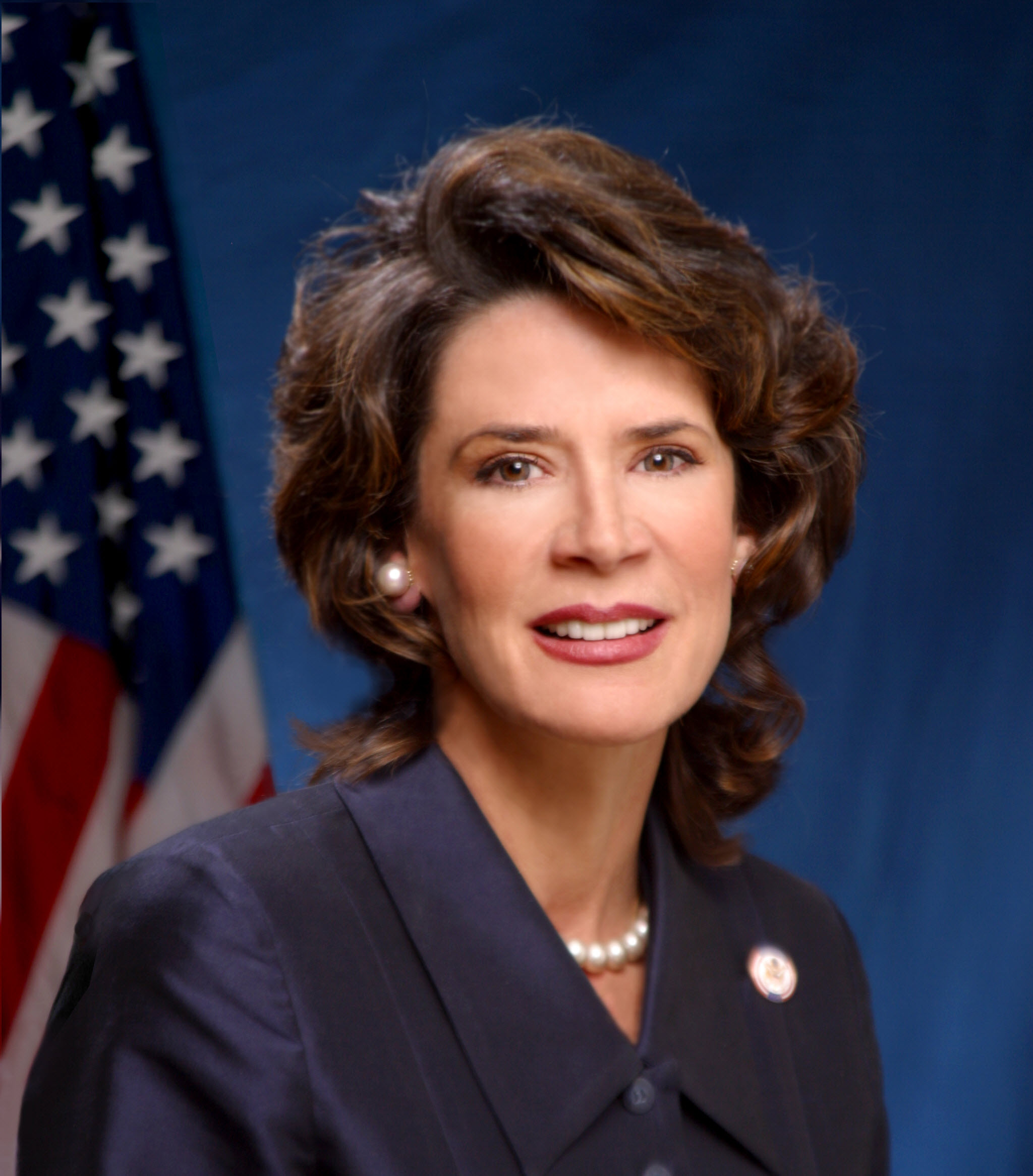
- Official portrait, 2003

Member of the U.S. House of Representatives from Florida's 13th district
- In office January 3, 2003 – January 3, 2007
- Preceded by: Dan Miller
- Succeeded by: Vern Buchanan

23rd Secretary of State of Florida
- In office January 5, 1999 – August 2, 2002
- Governor: Jeb Bush
- Preceded by: Sandra Mortham
- Succeeded by: James Smith

Member of the Florida Senate from the 24th district
- In office November 8, 1994 – November 3, 1998
- Preceded by: Jim Boczar
- Succeeded by: Lisa Carlton

Personal details
- Born: April 5, 1957 (age 69) Key West, Florida, U.S.
- Party: Republican
- Spouses: Anders Ebbeson (m. 1996; died 2013); Richard Ware (m. 2017)
- Relatives: Ben Hill Griffin Jr. (grandfather)
- Education: Agnes Scott College (BA); Harvard University (MPA)

Katherine Harris (born April 5, 1957) is an American politician from Florida. A Republican, she served in the Florida Senate from 1994 to 1998, as Secretary of State of Florida from 1999 to 2002, and as a member of the United States House of Representatives from Florida's 13th congressional district from 2003 to 2007. Harris lost her 2006 campaign for a United States Senate seat from Florida to incumbent Democratic U.S. Senator Bill Nelson.

In the 2000 presidential election, she received international attention for her role as the elected Florida Secretary of State during the state's election recount, certifying George W. Bush's narrow victory (537 votes) over Al Gore and awarding him the Florida electors, which gained him the national election.

== Early life and education ==
Harris was born in Key West, Florida, to one of the state's wealthiest and most politically influential families. She is the daughter of Harriett (Griffin) and George W. Harris Jr., who owned Citrus and Chemical Bank in Lakeland, Florida. Her maternal grandfather was Ben Hill Griffin Jr., a successful businessman in the citrus and cattle industries and a powerful figure in the state legislature. Shortly before his death in 1990, he was ranked as the 261st richest American on the Forbes 400 list. Ben Hill Griffin Stadium at the University of Florida is named for him.

Harris graduated from Bartow High School in Bartow, Florida, in 1975, after attending Santa Fe Catholic High School in Lakeland, Florida, from 1972 to 1974. She attended the University of Madrid in 1978. Harris received a Bachelor of Arts degree in history from Agnes Scott College in Decatur, Georgia, in 1979. She studied under Christian theologian Francis Schaeffer at the L'Abri community in Huemoz, Switzerland. While in college, she interned for U.S. Senator Lawton Chiles and U.S. representative Andy Ireland.

Before entering politics, Harris worked as a marketing executive at IBM and a vice president of a commercial real estate firm. Harris earned a M.P.A. from Harvard University's John F. Kennedy School of Government in International Trade and Negotiations in 1996.

== Career ==
Harris ran for the Florida Senate as a Republican in 1994 in one of the most expensive state races in Florida history to that time.

=== Florida senate and Riscorp ===
Harris played a prominent role in introducing William Griffin, the CEO of Riscorp, to various Florida legislators. In the 1994 state senate election, Sarasota-based Riscorp, Inc. made illegal contributions totaling $400,000 to dozens of political candidates and committees, including $20,600 to the Harris campaign.

Two years later, in 1996, Harris sponsored a bill "to block Riscorp competitors from getting a greater share of Florida workers' compensation market, [and] also pushed a proposal that would hurt a particular competitor." This issue later emerged during her campaign for Florida Secretary of State in 1998.

William Griffin eventually pleaded guilty to illegal campaign donations, among allegations of other serious wrongdoing at Riscorp, and served prison time in 1998. According to a Sun-Herald column from June 2005, "Harris denied any knowledge of the scheme, was never charged with any crime and was cleared of wrongdoing by a state investigator."

=== Florida secretary of state ===
Harris (left) with Miami-Dade Mayor Alex Penelas (center) and Miami-Dade Commissioner Katy Sorenson (right) in September 1999

Harris was elected Florida Secretary of State in 1998. She defeated then-incumbent Sandra Mortham in the Republican primary and won the general election against Democratic candidate, Karen Gievers, an attorney from Miami. A state constitutional change was passed in the same year, making the Secretary of State an appointed office. This change made Harris the last person to be elected Secretary of State in Florida.

Harris abruptly resigned in August 2002 while campaigning for Congress when it was discovered that she had violated Florida's "resign to run", which stated "...No officer may qualify as a candidate for another public office, whether state, district, county or municipal, if the terms or any part thereof run concurrently with each other, without resigning from the office he or she presently holds." Since the start of her Congressional term (January 3, 2003) would overlap with the end of her term as Secretary of State (January 7, 2003), she was required to submit a letter of resignition. The law allowed candidates to have the resignation be effective up until the term for the new office began. Since Harris failed to do so, she was required to resign immediately. Harris said the oversight was unintentional. She said that she thought because Florida voters had approved a constitutional amendment that made the position of Secretary of State an appointed office rather than an elected office, the law did not apply to her situation.

=== International travel ===
During her first 22 months in office, Harris spent more than $106,000 for travel, more than the governor or any other cabinet officer. She visited eight countries on ten foreign trips.

In early 2001, the Florida Senate leaders eliminated the $3.4 million that Harris had budgeted for international relations for the year, assigning it instead to Enterprise Florida, the state's economic development agency. However, Tom Feeney, the Speaker of the Florida House of representatives at the time, said that he disagreed with the Senate and believed that Harris was an able advocate to foreign countries. After the House refused to agree with the proposed budget action, the Senate agreed to restore the money; however, it insisted on a review committee, appointed by Senate President John McKay, Feeney, and Governor Jeb Bush, to evaluate all of Harris' expenditures on international affairs since July 1, 1999, and produce a report.

=== 2000 U.S. presidential election ===
As Secretary of State of Florida (and co-chair of Republican George W. Bush's election efforts in Florida), Harris was a central figure in the 2000 US presidential election in Florida. She was involved in purging 173,000 individuals from the state's voter rolls, the results of hiring a firm, "Choice Point", that provided Florida with an extremely inaccurate list of those supposed felons who became disenfranchised via misidentification. The list was derived from, for instance, a Texas felons' list which included common names that were used to strike Florida voters from the rolls. Thousands, including a disproportionate number of Blacks, were prevented from casting ballots.

The Florida election between Bush and Democrat Al Gore was so close, separated by only 537 votes, that a recount of the votes was demanded.

After several recounts were inconclusive, Harris halted the recounting process, arguing that the laws governing recounts were unclear. The official vote totals showed Bush as the narrow winner of the statewide popular vote in Florida, so Harris certified the Republican slate of electors. This victory in Florida allowed Bush to obtain a narrow majority in the Electoral College and thereby prevail in the election. Her certification was upheld in the state circuit court, but subsequently overturned on appeal by the Florida Supreme Court. The Florida Supreme Court decision was reversed by the U.S. Supreme Court in Bush v. Gore (2000). In a per curiam decision, by a 7–2 vote, the Court held that the Florida Supreme Court's method for recounting ballots was a violation of the Equal Protection Clause of the Fourteenth Amendment. Furthermore, it held, by a 5–4 vote, that no alternative method for a recount could be established within the time limits set by the State of Florida. Sandra Day O'Connor's vote to stop the recount was crucial. This decision allowed Harris' previous certification of Bush as the winner of Florida's electoral votes to stand. Florida's 25 electoral votes gave Bush, the Republican candidate, 271 electoral votes, thus defeating Gore, who ended up with 266 electoral votes (one D.C. elector abstained).

Harris later published Center of the Storm, her memoir of the 2000 election controversy. It was later revealed that, unimpressed with her performance in the media spotlight of the recount, the Bush Campaign had assigned a staff member to her, essentially as a handler.

=== United States congresswoman ===
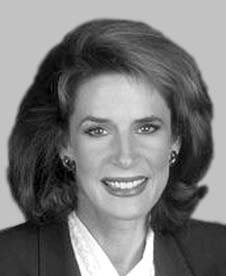
Representative Harris's first congressional portrait photo, 2003

In the 2002 U.S. House elections, Harris ran for Florida’s 13th congressional district seat, facing Sarasota attorney Jan Schneider. This seat was left open by retiring Republican Representative Dan Miller. Harris secured a decisive victory, winning by a margin of 10 percentage points in the strongly Republican district. Her campaign was bolstered by one of the largest first-term fundraising efforts in the district’s history and significant backing from the Bush family.

Harris considered running for the seat of retiring Senator Bob Graham in 2004 but was reportedly dissuaded by the Bush White House to allow Secretary of Housing and Urban Development Mel Martinez to run instead. Martinez went on to narrowly beat challenger Betty Castor. Harris ran for re-election to her House seat in 2004; she was re-elected with a margin almost identical to her first win.

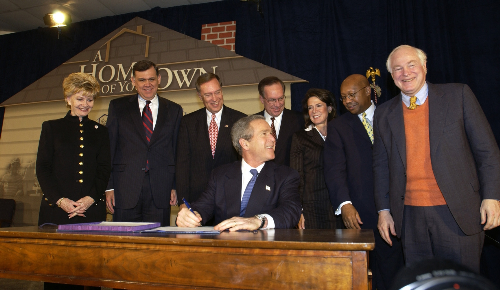
Congresswoman Harris joins President George W. Bush and other members of Congress at the bill signing ceremony for the American Dream Downpayment Act

In a 2004 speech in Venice, Florida, Harris claimed that a "Middle Eastern" man was arrested for attempting to blow up the power grid in Carmel, Indiana; Carmel Mayor James Brainard and a spokesman for Indiana governor Joe Kernan said they had no knowledge of such a plot. Brainard said he had never spoken to Harris.

During a 2004 campaign stop in Sarasota, a local resident, Barry Seltzer, "tr[ied] to 'intimidate' a group of Harris supporters" by menacing Harris and her supporters with his automobile. Witnesses described Seltzer as having swerved off the road and onto the sidewalk, directing it at Harris and her supporters. Nobody was injured in the incident. Seltzer, who claimed he was "exercising [his] political expression," was eventually arrested and charged with assault with a deadly weapon.

=== MZM incident ===
In 2005 and 2006, a major corporate campaign donor to Harris, Mitchell Wade (founder of defense contractor MZM), was implicated in several bribery scandals. Wade had bundled together and donated to Harris's campaign $32,000 in contributions from his employees at MZM, Inc., then reimbursed those employees for the contributions. Regarding this issue, U.S. Attorney Kenneth Wainstein said that Harris did not appear to know the donations were obtained illegally. Harris has maintained she had no personal knowledge that her campaign was given illegal contributions. Wade acknowledged that the donations to the Harris campaign were illegal and were part of an attempt to influence Harris to MZM's benefit.

Documents filed with Wade's plea say that he took Harris to dinner in March 2005, a year after the illegal contributions, where they discussed the possibility of another fundraiser and the possibility of getting funding for a Navy counterintelligence program placed in Harris's district. Harris sent a letter on April 26, 2005, to defense appropriations subcommittee Chairman C. W. Bill Young, in which Harris sought $10 million for a Navy project backed by Wade. In the letter, Harris emphasized the importance of the project, asking that it be added to her list of five priorities and identifying it as her new No. 3. Harris later released the April 26, 2005, letter for legal scrutiny, but neither she nor Young would turn over the request form (RFP) used for the proposal.

CQPolitics noted "Harris's former political strategist, Ed Rollins, spoke on the record about the dinner and detailed a meal that cost $2,800, far in excess of the $50 limit on gifts that members of Congress are allowed to accept" at the Washington restaurant Citronelle. Wade and Harris discussed MZM's desire for a $10 million appropriation, and Wade offered to host a fundraiser for Harris's 2006 Senate campaign. Regarding the MZM contributions, the Sentinel article goes on to say "The Justice Department has said Wade, who personally handed many of the checks to Harris, did not tell Harris the contributions were illegal". Regarding the expensive meal, the article quotes Harris as saying that she personally had only a "beverage and appetizer" worth less than "$100".

Rollins said that he had conducted a thorough internal investigation into Harris's ties to MZM in hopes of finding conclusive proof of her innocence; but when he could not, he and other advisers, including her lawyer, urged her to drop her candidacy rather than risk federal corruption charges. Although he did not believe Harris intentionally broke any laws, "her story kept changing. Our great concern was that you get into trouble when you don't tell the same story twice ... Maybe you don't think you did anything wrong, but then maybe you start getting questioned about it and so forth, and you may perjure yourself. ... Unlike Cunningham, I don't think she set out to violate the law, but I think she was very careless. She heard whatever she wanted to hear, but we could find no evidence whatsoever that this was a project going into her district."

Although Rollins recalled discussing the $2,800 meal with Harris, Harris told the Orlando Sentinel on April 19, 2006, that the cost of the meal was "news to me", and that her campaign had since "reimbursed" the restaurant for the cost of the meal. According to the reporter, when questioned as to why she would reimburse the restaurant for a meal that had been paid for by MZM, Harris abruptly terminated the interview, and her spokesman later called and requested unsuccessfully that the story not be printed. The next day, Harris's campaign issued a statement that she had believed her campaign had reimbursed the restaurant, and that she had donated $100 "which will more than adequately compensate for the cost of my beverage and appetizer". Harris also asserted that most of the cost of the meal was from Wade ordering several unopened bottles of wine to take home, although the management of the restaurant denies ever allowing anyone to take unopened bottles of wine off the premises, saying "Why would we jeopardize our liquor license for the sake of selling a couple bottles of wine?"

In the weeks following the expensive meal, former senior Harris staffers claimed that "they initially rejected a defense contractor's $10 million appropriation request last year but reversed course after being instructed by Harris to approve it." In May 2006, Harris's campaign spokesman Christopher Ingram acknowledged that she had also had a previous dinner with Wade in the same restaurant in March 2004, when the $32,000 in illegal donations had been given to her campaign. Ingram told the press that he did not know how much that meal cost, but that a charitable donation of an unknown amount had been given to a charity whose name he did not know, equivalent to her share of the meal. "She takes responsibility for the oversight that there was no reimbursement," he said.

Mona Tate Yost, an aide to Harris, left to work for MZM during the time Wade was pressing Harris to secure federal funding (April or May 2005). On July 17, 2006, Ed Rollins confirmed that Justice Department lawyers and FBI agents had recently questioned her about the $32,000 in donations. Rollins noted: "I assume more [interviews] will be coming, though. They were very serious." On September 7, 2006, Federal investigators questioned Jim Dornan, who quit as Harris's campaign manager the previous November.

=== 2006 Senate race ===
==== Overview ====
On June 7, 2005, with support from her new campaign advisors of Ed Rollins and Jim Dornan, Harris announced her candidacy for the United States Senate election, challenging Democratic incumbent Bill Nelson. Both lackluster fundraising relative to Nelson and controversy over campaign contributions from MZM caused Harris to fall far behind in all polls by May 2006. Late in the primary race, Republican contender Will McBride polled 31 points behind Nelson in a hypothetical election against him, while Harris polled 33 points behind Nelson in the same poll. Harris was still popular among Republican voters and won the September 5 primary over McBride and two other challengers with approximately 50% of the total vote.

Despite Harris's support of many Republican causes and her previous statewide victories, some party leaders expressed doubt about her statewide appeal:

- Jeb Bush, Governor of Florida, questioned Harris's ability to win the general election and encouraged others to challenge her in the primary in May 2006.
- Karl Rove expressed doubts about her statewide appeal.
- National Republicans openly criticized her campaign and tried to convince other GOP candidates to challenge Harris in the primary.
- Allan Bense, speaker of the state house, declined launching a campaign on May 11 despite public courting by Gov. Bush and other leaders.
- Former U.S. Rep. Joe Scarborough was also unsuccessfully recruited by Elizabeth Dole, chair of the National Republican Senatorial Committee for the 2006 cycle, to enter the race. Departing Harris aides claim that she called potential Scarborough supporters and raised the death of an aide, which was determined to have no foul play, in an attempt to prevent his entry into the race, though Scarborough had already told NRSC staff he was declining to run. Scarborough later told Nelson that drawing Harris as an opponent in the race made him "the luckiest man in Washington".

By late July 2006, Harris had gone through three campaign managers and her campaign was floundering. At that time, it was disclosed that state Republican Party leaders had told Harris they would not support her because she could not win in the general election.

Financial problems plagued Harris' Senate campaign from the start. During the primary, it was clear that the incumbent Senator Nelson had a substantial financial advantage.

On the March 15, 2006, episode of Fox News Channel's Hannity & Colmes, Harris announced her commitment to invest $10 million of her own inheritance into her Senate campaign. She described this amount as her entire inheritance and dedicated her campaign to the memory of her late father, George W. Harris Jr., who had been the chairman and president of Citrus & Chemical Bank, a prominent institution in Florida.

Despite her promise, the $10 million never materialized. Reports surfaced that Harris would not actually receive the inheritance from her father, who instead left his entire estate to her mother. She donated $3 million to her campaign, but later took back $100,000, fueling speculation that she would be unable to donate the promised amount.

In October, Harris announced that she was trying to sell her house in Washington to raise money for her campaign, but the home was not publicly listed for sale and no sale was ever announced.

Nelson defeated Harris by more than one million votes. Harris received less than 39% of the vote.

==== Staff resignations ====
In late February 2006, in the midst of revelations surrounding Mitchell Wade's illegal contributions, Harris's campaign finance director and her campaign treasurer both resigned. On April 1, 2006, Harris's top campaign advisor, pollster and campaign manager all resigned with a half-dozen other staffers. Republican pollster and consultant David Johnson said, "I've never seen staffers go like this. It's just imploding."

In early April 2006, Harris told the Tampa Tribune that some of her ex-campaign staffers and the national Republican party were deliberately sabotaging her campaign by "putting knives in her back" and had warned her that if she did not back out of the campaign, she would get an "April surprise". Former campaign staffer Ed Rollins said "They were all good professionals ... There was no backstabbing. It's insulting that she would even say that. If she wants to know what went wrong with the campaign, maybe she needs to take a good look in the mirror."

In June, the Harris campaign received a legal bill for thousands of dollars that contained a reference to "DOJ subpoena". Later, an ex-aide told the Associated Press that Harris had received a grand jury subpoena from federal investigators, but kept it from her top advisers, prompting several staff members to quit when they found out. On June 8, 2006, Harris's fourth chief of staff, Fred Asbell, left in order to pursue a "business opportunity". Asbell said he'd "greatly enjoyed" his time with the campaign and he would remain in a consultant position.

On July 12, 2006, Harris's campaign spokesman Chris Christopher Ingram left the campaign. The next day, Harris received resignations from Campaign Manager Glenn Hodas, Field Director Pat Thomas, Political Director Brian Brooks and Deputy Field Director John K. Byers, while Travel Aide Kyle Johnson and Field Director Mike Norris declined to leave, citing loyalty to Harris. Hodas cited Harris's "tantrums" and "increasingly erratic behavior" as his reasons for leaving. An anonymous campaign worker described Harris as "very difficult to work with. The more that we put her out there, the more she shot herself in the foot."

In late August, Harris lost another key staffer, Rhyan Metzler, in the wake of a disastrous political rally at Orlando Executive Airport. Only 40 people showed up for the event, and Harris blamed the paltry turnout in part on a last-minute change in location. She claimed that a tree fell on the hangar that was originally scheduled to hold the rally, forcing her campaign to switch to another hangar. Airport officials, however, stated that not only had no trees fallen, but also that there are no trees as they get in the way of the airplanes; further adding that the event in fact took place in the hangar that Harris's campaign had originally booked. Harris's campaign blamed Metzler for the comments Harris made after the rally. On August 31, 2006, Harris was interviewed on Hardball with Chris Matthews, where she responded to the criticisms from her former staffers with "We have their email traffic, we know what was behind all that, we know who's been paid and who isn't."

==== Lack of Republican support ====
The Pensacola News Journal suggested that Harris might withdraw from the Senate race after winning a primary victory, thereby allowing the Republicans to nominate another candidate, such as Tom Gallagher, to run against Bill Nelson.

In August, Katherine Harris touted political endorsements from fellow Republican lawmakers on her campaign web site. However, some of those cited claim that they never endorsed her. This conflict resulted in several Republican congressmen calling the Harris campaign to complain after the St. Petersburg Times notified them of the endorsements listed on Harris's Web site. A short time later, their names were removed without comment from Harris's Web site.

Of Harris's three primary opponents, only Will McBride endorsed her candidacy for the general election. In the first few days after the primary, a number of Republican nominees such as Charlie Crist and Tom Lee went on a statewide unity tour with Governor Bush. Harris was not invited; Republicans said the tour was only for nominees to state constitutional offices. Harris claimed Bush would campaign with her sometime in the two months before the election, but the governor's office denied this.

President Bush did not make public appearances or private meetings with Harris before the primary. He did, however, appear with her at a fundraiser on September 21 in Tampa. When it came time for newspapers to make their op-ed endorsements, all 22 of Florida's major daily newspapers supported Senator Nelson. The only endorsement Harris received was from the Polk County Democrat, a newspaper in Bartow which publishes four days out of the week.

=== Replacements in the 13th Congressional District ===
Vern Buchanan was the Republican nominee and Christine Jennings the Democratic nominee to replace Harris in the 2006 election. The race had been ranked as "leaning Democratic" by CQ Politics, but Buchanan scored a very narrow victory, winning the election by a few hundred votes.

== Religious positions ==
Harris was a headline speaker at the Coral Ridge Presbyterian Church's "Reclaiming America for Christ" conference held in Ft. Lauderdale on March 17–18, 2006. The conference web site invited attendees to attend in order to "reclaim this nation for Christ." The stated mission of ReclaimAmerica.org is "To inform, equip, motivate, and support Christians; enabling them to defend and implement the Biblical principles on which our country was founded." As part of her speech, Harris urged conferees to "win back America for God." Her appearance was noted in a Rolling Stone article covering the conference.

In an interview with the Florida Baptist Witness on August 24, 2006, Harris called for Christians to vote on religious lines. She said,

We have to have the faithful in government and over time, that lie we have been told, the separation of church and state, people have internalized, thinking that they needed to avoid politics and that is so wrong because God is the one who chooses our rulers. And if we are the ones not actively involved in electing those godly men and women and if people aren't involved in helping godly men in getting elected then we're going to have a nation of secular laws. That's not what our founding fathers intended and that's certainly isn't what God intended. ... we need to take back this country. ... And if we don't get involved as Christians then how could we possibly take this back? ... If you are not electing Christians, tried and true, under public scrutiny and pressure, if you're not electing Christians then in essence you are going to legislate sin. They can legislate sin. They can say that abortion is alright. They can vote to sustain gay marriage. And that will take western civilization, indeed other nations because people look to our country as one nation as under God and whenever we legislate sin and we say abortion is permissible and we say gay unions are permissible, then average citizens who are not Christians, because they don't know better, we are leading them astray and it's wrong.

Representative Debbie Wasserman Schultz (D-FL) said she was "disgusted" by the comments "and deeply disappointed in Representative Harris personally," adding that Harris's statement "clearly shows that she does not deserve to be a representative." Two of Harris' primary opponents denounced her statements, Republican Will McBride (an attorney and son of a pastor) stated "I'm a Christian, and I'm a Republican, and I don't share her views. There are people of other faiths and backgrounds of outstanding integrity who know how to tell the truth." Real estate developer Peter Monroe, another GOP primary opponent, called on her to quit the race and resign from Congress. He called her suggestion that non-Christian voters are ignorant of morality when voting as "contemptible, arrogant and wicked."

On August 26, 2006, Harris's campaign released a "Statement of Clarification", that stated, "In the interview, Harris was speaking to a Christian audience, addressing a common misperception that people of faith should not be actively involved in government. Addressing this Christian publication, Harris provided a statement that explains her deep grounding in Judeo-Christian values." The press release went on to mention her past support of Israel and quoted her Jewish campaign manager Bryan G. Rudnick, who stated "As the grandson of Holocaust survivors, I know that she encourages people of all faiths to engage in government so that our country can continue to thrive on the principles set forth by our founding fathers, without malice towards anyone." At an appearance at an Orlando gun show that same day, she said "it breaks my heart" to think people understood her comments as bigoted. When asked if she thought the Founding Fathers intended the nation to have secular laws she replied,

I think that our laws, I mean, I look at how the law originated, even from Moses, the Ten Commandments. And I don't believe, that uh. ... That's how all of our laws originated in the United States, period. I think that's the basis of our rule of law.

On October 3, 2006, Harris participated in a prayer service via phone call. In one instance, she called for the elimination of the separation of church and state when she said,

Treat the pastors' hearts so that those who think there's no place for government, have them understand kingdom government, and how they need to be involved in the governance on this earth because God is our governance.

Harris then went on and prayed for Jews to be converted to Christianity.

And Father God, right now on the day after the Jewish new year, Father, after the day after atonement, as they enter into their new year, Father God, I just pray that you would bring the hearts and minds of our Jewish brothers and sisters into alignment.

== Political positions and voting record ==
Harris was conservative on most issues. She is anti-abortion and voted against embryonic stem cell research. Harris supported reforming Social Security to include private accounts. She voted in favor of granting legal status to fetuses via the Unborn Victims of Violence Act. She supported tax cuts and the Bankruptcy Abuse Prevention and Consumer Protection Act, which restricts bankruptcy filings by consumers. Harris was in favor of welfare reform, school vouchers, the Patriot Act, the Flag Desecration Amendment, the Federal Marriage Amendment, and the 2003 invasion of Iraq. In a televised debate with Nelson on November 1, however, she repeatedly declined to say whether she would still support the Iraq War Resolution knowing that Iraq did not have weapons of mass destruction. In an earlier debate with Nelson, Harris was asked to comment on trade of arms with foreign nations and the potential threat of their acquisition by terrorist groups. Harris responded that "we know we don't want to have arms going to the rogue nations like China."

== In popular culture ==
Katherine Harris was the subject of some sketches on Saturday Night Live, in which she was played by Ana Gasteyer, and she was played by Mo Collins on MADtv. She was also portrayed by actress Laura Dern in the 2008 film Recount, for which Dern won a Golden Globe. Harris was satirically portrayed by comedian Janeane Garofalo as "Senator Katherine Harris" on the Internet talk radio and podcast show The Majority Report with Sam Seder.

== Personal life ==
Harris's extended family has been active in Christian evangelism. Her grandfather was a Christian missionary in Africa, while her aunt and uncle were missionaries in India. They headed the Arab World Missions as of 2006. Harris studied under Dr. Francis Schaeffer at a L'Abri Fellowship International center. Harris attended Greystone, an all-girls Christian camp in Tuxedo, North Carolina. She has said her faith is "the most important thing in my life." Harris has criticized the Presbyterian Church (U.S.A.) for being too liberal; she was reared in the more conservative Presbyterian Church in America. She attended Calvary Chapel, a non-denominational charismatic church in Sarasota, Florida as of 2006.

Harris married Swedish businessman Sven Anders Axel Ebbeson in 1996 and has one stepdaughter, Louise. Sven Ebbeson committed suicide in November 2013 at their home in Sarasota; he had reportedly been suffering a serious illness. In 2017, after admitting she'd become "a near recluse" since Ebbeson's death, she married Texas banker Richard Ware.

== Federal electoral history ==
Florida's 13th congressional district election (2002)
Party	Candidate	Votes	%
Republican	Katherine Harris	139,048	54.79
Democratic	Jan Schneider	114,739	45.21
Total votes		253,787	100.00
Turnout			
Republican hold			

Florida's 13th congressional district election (2004)
Party	Candidate	Votes	%
Republican	Katherine Harris (incumbent)	190,477	55.30
Democratic	Jan Schneider	153,961	44.70
Total votes		344,438	100.00
Turnout			
Republican hold			

2006 U.S. Senate Republican primary results (Florida)
Party	Candidate	Votes	%
Republican	Katherine Harris	474,871	49.4
Republican	Will McBride	287,741	30.0
Republican	LeRoy Collins Jr.	146,712	15.3
Republican	Peter Monroe	51,330	5.3
Total votes		960,654	100.0

2006 U.S. Senate (Florida) General election results
Party	Candidate	Votes	%	±%
Democratic	Bill Nelson (incumbent)	2,890,548	60.3	+9.8
Republican	Katherine Harris	1,826,127	38.1	−8.1
Independent	Belinda Noah	24,880	0.5	n/a
Independent	Brian Moore	19,695	0.4	n/a
Independent	Floyd Ray Frazier	16,628	0.3	n/a
Independent	Roy Tanner	15,562	0.3	n/a
Write-in		94	0.0	n/a
Majority		1,064,421	22.2	+17.4
Turnout		4,793,534		
Democratic hold		Swing		

== See also ==
- Florida election recount
- Women in the United States House of Representatives

Political offices
Preceded by Sandra Mortham	Secretary of State of Florida; 1999–2002	Succeeded by James Smith
U.S. House of Representatives
Preceded by Dan Miller	Member of the U.S. House of Representatives from Florida's 13th congressional district 2003–2007	Succeeded by Vern Buchanan
Party political offices
Preceded by Bill McCollum	Republican nominee for U.S. Senator from Florida (Class 1); 2006	Succeeded by Connie Mack
U.S. order of precedence (ceremonial)
Preceded by Jim Bacchus as Former U.S. Representative	Order of precedence of the United States as Former U.S. Representative	Succeeded by Ron Klein as Former U.S. Representative
