= Venezuela TPS Act of 2019 =

Bill of the United States Congress responding to the 2019 Venezuelan Presidential Crisis

Venezuela Temporary Protected Status Act of 2019
- Long title: A Bill to designate Venezuela under section 244 of the Immigration and Nationality Act to permit nationals of Venezuela to be eligible for temporary protected status under such section, and for other purposes.
- Nicknames: Venezuela TPS Act of 2019
- Announced in: the 116th United States Congress
- Number of co-sponsors: 33

Legislative history
- Introduced in the House of Representatives as H.R. 549 by Darren Soto (D–FL) on January 15, 2019; Committee consideration by House Judiciary Committee (January 15, 2019) House Judiciary Subcommittee on Immigration and Citizenship (February 25, 2019) Senate Judiciary Committee (July 29, 2019); Passed the House on July 25, 2019 (272−158)

The Venezuela TPS Act of 2019 is a bill in the 116th United States Congress sponsored by Rep. Darren Soto (D-FL) and Mario Díaz-Balart (R-FL). It aims to extend temporary protected status to Venezuelan nationals in light of the 2019 Venezuelan presidential crisis and the crisis in Venezuela in general.

The bill was introduced to the House as H.R. 549 on January 15, 2019.

The bill was reintroduced in the 117th congress in 2021 (H.R. 161 and S. 50).

== Introduction ==
Announcing the bill, Washington, D.C., said it was a bill introduced because of "egregious human rights abuses" and "an economic, humanitarian, and security crisis" in Venezuela. D.C. said that this has caused many Venezuelans to become refugees in foreign countries, and that whilst corruption remains in Venezuela these people should be protected.

Soto and Díaz-Balart each gave statements, both alluding to suffering under Nicolás Maduro's presidency, described by Soto as "tyrannical". Soto said that "TPS [is] a way to help protect our brothers and sisters escaping Maduro's terror"; Díaz-Balart said that "[w]e must not force Venezuelans who have sought safety in the United States to return to such dangerous conditions".

A similar bill had been introduced to the Senate of the 115th Congress as S. 3759 in December 2018, which invoked Section 244 of the Immigration and Nationality Act. This bill also aimed to strengthen migration routes in South America to help people immediately trying to exit Venezuela to a neighboring country. United States President Donald Trump did not support this bill, and had been trying to end TPS for months at the time. The bill was re-introduced to the Senate as S. 636 on February 28, 2019.

Despite this, Soto, speaking in January 2019, said he believed that the developing conditions in Venezuela had reached a point that Trump may be likely to support his new bill, saying that "[i]f there is a country that might get TPS approved by the White House, it would be Venezuela". He also suggested Trump may favor the bill because it would be a further sanction against the Maduro administration. Díaz-Balart said that the bill is "in lockstep with [the White House's] "aggressive" stance against the government of [Maduro]".

== Proposed protection level ==
Venezuela TPS Act of 2019

Under the bill, the protection status of Venezuelans in the United States would be quite high. They would not face deportation, be granted work authorization, as well as be able to travel abroad without the threat of not being allowed to return. The bill would automatically apply to all Venezuelans who have been continuously present in the United States at the time of enactment of the law, and would have an 18-month period for others to apply starting on the day it was signed into law. Soto's office believes it will give protection to around 200,000 Venezuelans.

== Responses ==
The Trump Administration said that they would not give TPS to Venezuelans, even though the Americas advocate to Amnesty International, Charanya Krishnaswami, said that Venezuela exemplified what the TPS system was designed for. Multiple people, including Senators in a joint letter, called Trump a hypocrite because of the announcement. Geoff Ramsey from the Washington Office on Latin America said that the wrong message is being sent to Venezuela and Latin America in trying to encourage US support, because refusing TPS whilst decrying the humanitarian situation shows that the "administration's concern for Venezuelans ends the instant they leave their country".

Political commentators believe that introducing the bill will give Trump support in his 2020 re-election campaign from the Venezuelan and Cuban population in the battleground state of Florida.

== Voting history ==
On July 25, 2019, the bill passed in the House of Representatives. All Democratic members voted in favor, and were joined by 39 Republican members. The Miami Herald had originally suggested it would need the support of 55 House Republicans, but that this number could be reasonably higher or lower depending on how many members were present. A fast-track vote on the Senate bill was introduced five days later, just before the summer recess, in order to quickly align with the House by bypassing procedure, which can be achieved with votes of unanimous consent. However, such votes fail if only one member opposes; Utah Republican Mike Lee opposed the bill and so it will have to be voted on in full after the recess.

Three votes were held in the House for the bill: to pass with amendments via suspension of rules and majority vote on July 23, which failed 268–145; to add amendments on July 25, which failed 215-217 shortly before the third vote; to pass the text as submitted on July 25, which passed 272–158.

On September 25, 2019, Florida Republican Senator Rick Scott proposed an amendment to the Temporary protected status designation through an amendment to the 2019 Venezuela Act; he offered to push the bill through the Senate immediately in exchange for holding regular reviews of countries awarded TPS, an overhaul of the renewable nature of the system.

On September 16, 2020, Senate Republicans blocked a proposal to fast-track the bill. On September 30, Republicans senators blocked once again the legislation, being the fifth time in the last 18 months. Shortly before ending his tenure, on January 20, 2021, Donald Trump approved Deferred Enforced Departure, protecting Venezuelans from deportation.

In March 2021, the Joe Biden administration granted the temporary protected status (TPS) to Venezuelan migrants living in the United States.

== See also ==
- Venezuelan refugee crisis
- Human rights in Venezuela
