= Dennis McDonald =

American politician

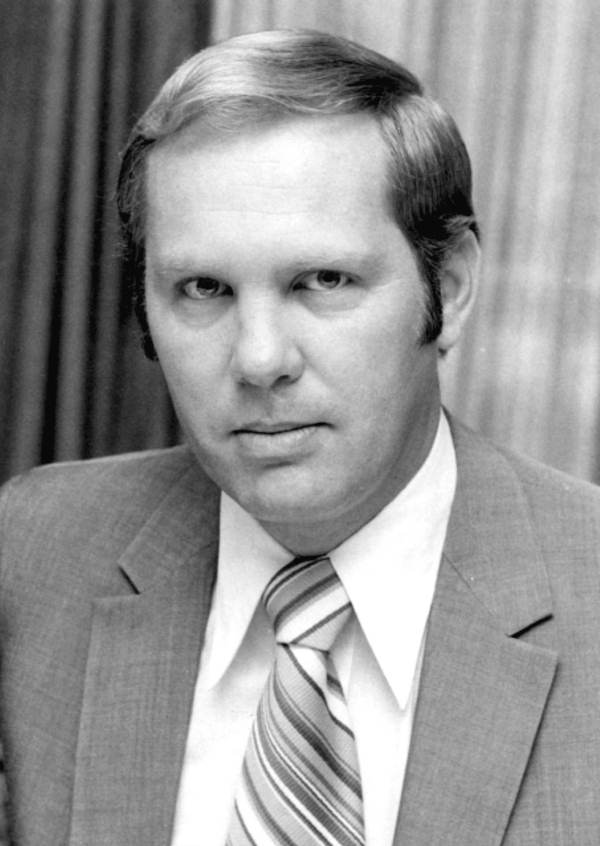

Member of the Florida House of Representatives for the 57th district
- In office 1973–1978

Member of the Florida House of Representatives from the 54th district
- In office 1970–1972

Personal details
- Born: July 14, 1938 (age 88) Brookfield, Illinois
- Party: Republican
- Occupation: Life insurance and mutual funds agent

Dennis McDonald (born July 14, 1938) was an American politician in the state of Florida.

McDonald was born in Brookfield, Illinois. He attended Jacksonville University and is a general agent of life insurance and mutual funds. He served as a Republican in the Florida House of Representatives from 1970 to 1972 representing the 5th district, and from 1973 to 1978, representing the 57th district.
