= 2018 United States House of Representatives elections in Florida =

- November 6, 2018

All 27 Florida seats to the United States House of Representatives
	Majority party	Minority party
Party	Republican	Democratic
Last election	16	11
Seats won	14	13
Seat change	▼2	▲2
Popular vote	3,675,417	3,307,228
Percentage	52.35%	47.10%
Swing	▼2.36%	▲1.89%

Republican
40–50%
50–60%
60–70%
70–80%
80–90%
Democratic
50–60%
60–70%
70–80%
90–100%

The 2018 United States House of Representatives elections in Florida were held on Tuesday, November 6, 2018, to elect the 27 U.S. representatives from the state of Florida, one from each of the state's 27 congressional districts. The elections coincided with the elections of other offices, including a gubernatorial election, other elections to the House of Representatives, elections to the United States Senate, and various state and local elections. The party primaries were held on August 28, 2018.

The state congressional delegation changed from a 16–11 Republican majority to a slim 14–13 Republican majority, one short from a Democratic flip. These were seen as the most seats Democrats had attained in Florida since 1982. As noted in the vote table below, Florida does not count votes in uncontested races, so the votes in the four uncontested seats held by Democratic members of the House are not counted in the totals or percentages on this page, and each under counts the votes for Democrats in Florida.

== Results summary ==
=== Statewide ===
Party	Candi- dates	Votes		Seats		
Party	Candi- dates	No.	%	No.	+/–	%
Republican	22	3,675,417	52.35%	14	▼2	51.85%
Democratic	27	3,307,228	47.10%	13	▲2	48.15%
Independent	6	38,550	0.55%	0	Steady	0.00%
Write-in	8	281	0.00%	0	Steady	0.00%
Total	63	7,021,476	100.00%	27	Steady	100.00%

Popular vote
Republican	52.35%
Democratic	47.10%
Independent	0.55%
Write-in	0.00%

House seats
Republican	51.85%
Democratic	48.15%

=== District ===
Results of the 2018 United States House of Representatives elections in Florida by district:

District	Republican		Democratic		Others		Total		Result
District	Votes	%	Votes	%	Votes	%	Votes	%	Result
District 1	216,189	67.06%	106,199	32.94%	0	0.00%	322,388	100.00%	Republican hold
District 2	199,335	67.44%	96,233	32.56%	0	0.00%	295,568	100.00%	Republican hold
District 3	176,616	57.62%	129,880	42.38%	0	0.00%	306,496	100.00%	Republican hold
District 4	248,420	65.16%	123,351	32.35%	9,478	2.49%	381,249	100.00%	Republican hold
District 5	89,799	33.22%	180,527	66.78%	0	0.00	270,326	100.00%	Democratic hold
District 6	187,891	56.31%	145,758	43.69%	0	0.00%	333,649	100.00%	Republican hold
District 7	134,285	42.31%	183,113	57.69%	0	0.00%	317,398	100.00%	Democratic hold
District 8	218,112	60.50%	142,415	39.50%	0	0.00%	360,527	100.00%	Republican hold
District 9	124,565	41.98%	172,172	58.02%	0	0.00%	296,737	100.00%	Democratic hold
District 10	–	–	–	–	–	–	–	–	Democratic hold
District 11	239,395	65.14%	128,053	34.84%	58	0.02%	367,506	100.00%	Republican hold
District 12	194,564	58.09%	132,844	39.66%	7,510	2.24%	334,918	100.00%	Republican hold
District 13	134,254	42.36%	182,717	57.64%	0	0.00%	316,971	100.00%	Democratic hold
District 14	–	–	–	–	–	–	–	–	Democratic hold
District 15	151,380	53.02%	134,132	46.98%	20	0.01%	285,532	100.00%	Republican hold
District 16	197,483	54.56%	164,463	45.44%	0	0.00%	361,946	100.00%	Republican hold
District 17	193,326	62.26%	117,194	37.74%	0	0.00%	310,520	100.00%	Republican hold
District 18	185,905	54.30%	156,454	45.70%	0	0.00%	342,359	100.00%	Republican hold
District 19	211,465	62.27%	128,106	37.72%	36	0.01%	339,607	100.00%	Republican hold
District 20	0	0.00%	202,659	99.92%	165	0.08%	202,824	100.00%	Democratic hold
District 21	–	–	–	–	–	–	–	–	Democratic hold
District 22	113,049	37.98%	184,634	62.02%	0	0.00%	297,683	100.00%	Democratic hold
District 23	99,446	35.98%	161,611	58.48%	15,309	5.54%	276,366	100.00%	Democratic hold
District 24	–	–	–	–	–	–	–	–	Democratic hold
District 25	128,672	60.45%	84,173	39.55%	0	0.00%	212,845	100.00%	Republican hold
District 26	115,678	49.13%	119,797	50.87%	0	0.00%	235,475	100.00%	Democratic gain
District 27	115,588	45.76%	130,743	51.76%	6,255	2.48%	252,586	100.00%	Democratic gain
Total	3,675,417	52.35%	3,307,228	47.10%	38,831	0.55%	7,021,476	100.00%	

== District 1 ==
2018 Florida's 1st congressional district election
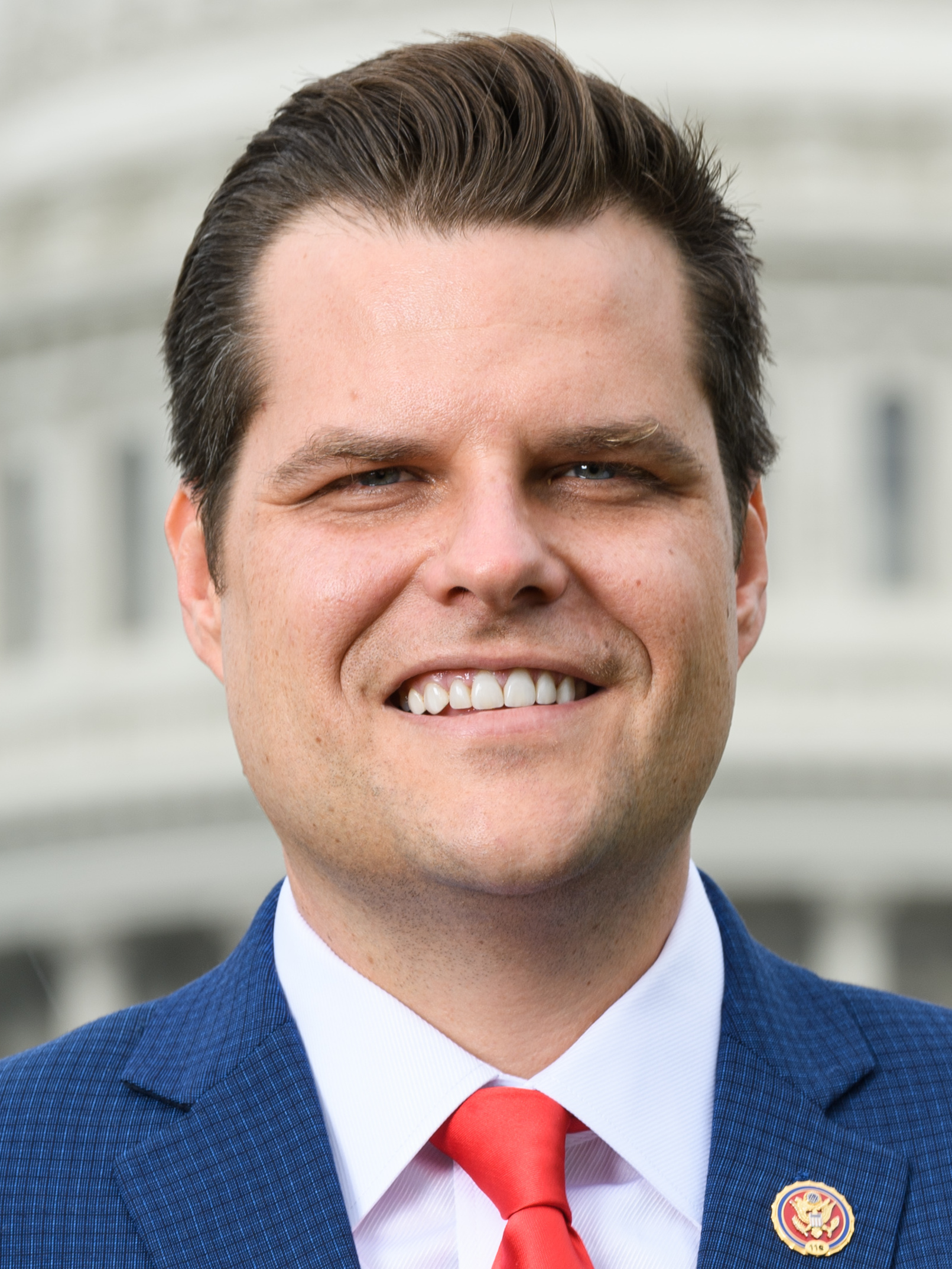

	Majority party	Minority party
Candidate	Matt Gaetz	Jennifer Zimmerman
Party	Republican	Democratic
Popular vote	216,189	106,199
Percentage	67.1%	32.9%
- Gaetz: 50–60% 60–70% 70–80% 80–90% <90% Zimmerman: 50–60% 60–70% 70–80% 80–90% <90%
U.S. Representative before election
Matt Gaetz
Republican
Elected U.S. Representative
Matt Gaetz
Republican

The 1st district stretches along the Emerald Coast and is located in the western Panhandle anchored by Pensacola, it also includes Fort Walton Beach, Navarre, and Wright. Incumbent Republican Matt Gaetz, who had represented the district since 2017, ran for re-election. He was elected with 69% of the vote in 2016. The district had a PVI of R+22.

=== Republican primary ===
==== Candidates ====
===== Nominee =====
- Matt Gaetz, incumbent U.S. Representative

===== Eliminated in primary =====
- Cris Dosev, businessman and candidate for this district in 2016
- John Mills, retired U.S. Navy pilot

==== Endorsements ====
Matt Gaetz

U.S. executive branch officials

- Donald Trump, President of the United States

Statewide officials

- Mike Huckabee, former Governor of Arkansas (1996–2007) and candidate for President of the United States in 2008 and 2016

Organizations

- Humane Society Legislative Fund
- NRA Political Victory Fund

==== Primary results ====
Republican primary results, Florida 2018
Party	Candidate	Votes	%
Republican	Matt Gaetz (incumbent)	65,203	64.8
Republican	Cris Dosev	30,433	30.2
Republican	John Mills	4,992	5.0
Total votes		100,628	100.0

=== Democratic primary ===
==== Candidates ====
===== Nominee =====
- Jennifer M. Zimmerman, pediatrician

===== Eliminated in primary =====
- Phil Ehr, U.S. Navy commander

==== Primary results ====
Democratic primary results, Florida 2018
Party	Candidate	Votes	%
Democratic	Jennifer M. Zimmerman	22,422	60.5
Democratic	Phil Ehr	14,650	39.5
Total votes		37,072	100.0

=== General election ===
==== Predictions ====
Source	Ranking	As of
The Cook Political Report	Safe R	November 5, 2018
Inside Elections	Safe R	November 5, 2018
Sabato's Crystal Ball	Safe R	November 5, 2018
RCP	Safe R	November 5, 2018
Daily Kos	Safe R	November 5, 2018
538	Safe R	November 7, 2018
CNN	Safe R	October 31, 2018
Politico	Safe R	November 4, 2018

==== Results ====
Florida's 1st congressional district, 2018
Party	Candidate	Votes	%
Republican	Matt Gaetz (incumbent)	216,189	67.1
Democratic	Jennifer M. Zimmerman	106,199	32.9
Total votes		322,388	100.0
Republican hold			

== District 2 ==
2018 Florida's 2nd congressional district election
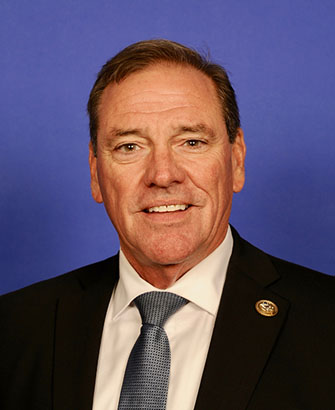

	Majority party	Minority party
Candidate	Neal Dunn	Bob Rackleff
Party	Republican	Democratic
Popular vote	199,335	96,233
Percentage	67.4%	32.6%
- Dunn: 50–60% 60–70% 70–80% 80–90% >90% Rackleff: 50–60% 60–70% 70–80% 80–90% >90%
U.S. Representative before election
Neal Dunn
Republican
Elected U.S. Representative
Neal Dunn
Republican

The 2nd district is located in the Big Bend region and is anchored by Panama City, and includes the suburbs of Tallahassee. Incumbent Republican Neal Dunn, who had represented the district since 2017, ran for re-election. He was elected with 67% of the vote in 2016. The district had a PVI of R+18.

=== Republican primary ===
==== Candidates ====
===== Nominee =====
- Neal Dunn, incumbent U.S. Representative

=== Democratic primary ===
==== Candidates ====
===== Nominee =====
- Bob Rackleff, former Leon County Commissioner

===== Eliminated in primary =====
- Brandon Peters, lawyer

==== Polling ====
Poll source	Date(s) administered	Sample size	Margin of error	Brandon Peters	Bob Rackleff	Undecided
Bold Blue Campaigns (D-Peters)	August 21–23, 2018	407	–	47%	36%	17%

==== Primary results ====
Democratic primary results, Florida 2018
Party	Candidate	Votes	%
Democratic	Bob Rackleff	29,395	50.8
Democratic	Brandon Peters	28,483	49.2
Total votes		57,878	100.0

=== General election ===
==== Predictions ====
Source	Ranking	As of
The Cook Political Report	Safe R	November 5, 2018
Inside Elections	Safe R	November 5, 2018
Sabato's Crystal Ball	Safe R	November 5, 2018
RCP	Safe R	November 5, 2018
Daily Kos	Safe R	November 5, 2018
538	Safe R	November 7, 2018
CNN	Safe R	October 31, 2018
Politico	Safe R	November 4, 2018

==== Results ====
Florida's 2nd congressional district, 2018
Party	Candidate	Votes	%
Republican	Neal Dunn (incumbent)	199,335	67.4
Democratic	Bob Rackleff	96,233	32.6
Total votes		295,568	100.0
Republican hold			

== District 3 ==
2018 Florida's 3rd congressional district election
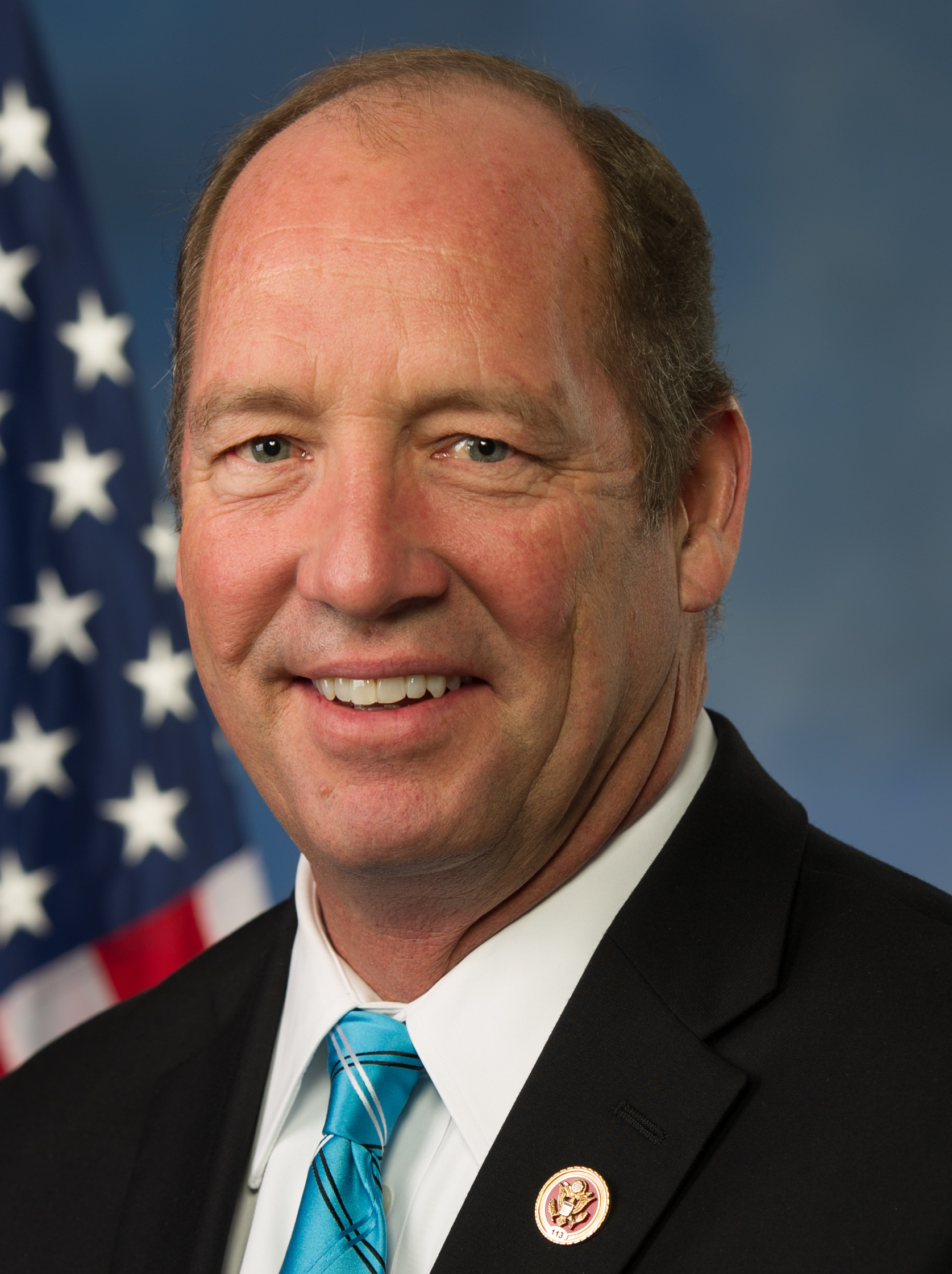

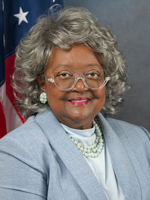
	Majority party	Minority party
Candidate	Ted Yoho	Yvonne Hayes Hinson
Party	Republican	Democratic
Popular vote	176,616	129,880
Percentage	57.6%	42.4%
- County results Yoho: 60–70% 70–80% 80–90% Hinson: 60–70%
U.S. Representative before election
Ted Yoho
Republican
Elected U.S. Representative
Ted Yoho
Republican

The 3rd district is located in North Central Florida and includes the cities of Gainesville, Palatka, and Ocala. Incumbent Republican Ted Yoho, who had represented the district since 2013, ran for re-election. He was elected to a third term with 57% of the vote in 2016. The district had a PVI of R+9.

=== Republican primary ===
==== Candidates ====
===== Nominee =====
- Ted Yoho, incumbent U.S. Representative

===== Eliminated in primary =====
- Judson Sapp, businessman

==== Endorsements ====
Judson Sapp

State legislators

- Jim Horne, former state senator

Local officials

- Rick Beseler, former Clay County sheriff
- Van Royal, Green Cove Springs city council member

==== Primary results ====
Republican primary results, Florida 2018
Party	Candidate	Votes	%
Republican	Ted Yoho (incumbent)	54,848	76.3
Republican	Judson Sapp	17,068	23.7
Total votes		71,916	100.0

=== Democratic primary ===
==== Candidates ====
===== Nominee =====
- Yvonne Hayes Hinson, former Gainesville City Commissioner

===== Eliminated in primary =====
- Dushyant Gosai, educator
- Tom Wells, businessman

==== Primary results ====
Democratic primary results, Florida 2018
Party	Candidate	Votes	%
Democratic	Yvonne Hayes Hinson	31,655	59.5
Democratic	Tom Wells	17,663	33.2
Democratic	Dushyant Gosai	3,883	7.3
Total votes		53,201	100.0

=== General election ===
==== Predictions ====
Source	Ranking	As of
The Cook Political Report	Safe R	November 5, 2018
Inside Elections	Safe R	November 5, 2018
Sabato's Crystal Ball	Safe R	November 5, 2018
RCP	Safe R	November 5, 2018
Daily Kos	Safe R	November 5, 2018
538	Safe R	November 7, 2018
CNN	Safe R	October 31, 2018
Politico	Safe R	November 4, 2018

==== Endorsements ====
Yvonne Hayes Hinson (D)

Labor unions

- International Brotherhood of Boilermakers

==== Results ====
Florida's 3rd congressional district, 2018
Party	Candidate	Votes	%
Republican	Ted Yoho (incumbent)	176,616	57.6
Democratic	Yvonne Hayes Hinson	129,880	42.4
Total votes		306,496	100.0
Republican hold			

== District 4 ==
2018 Florida's 4th congressional district election
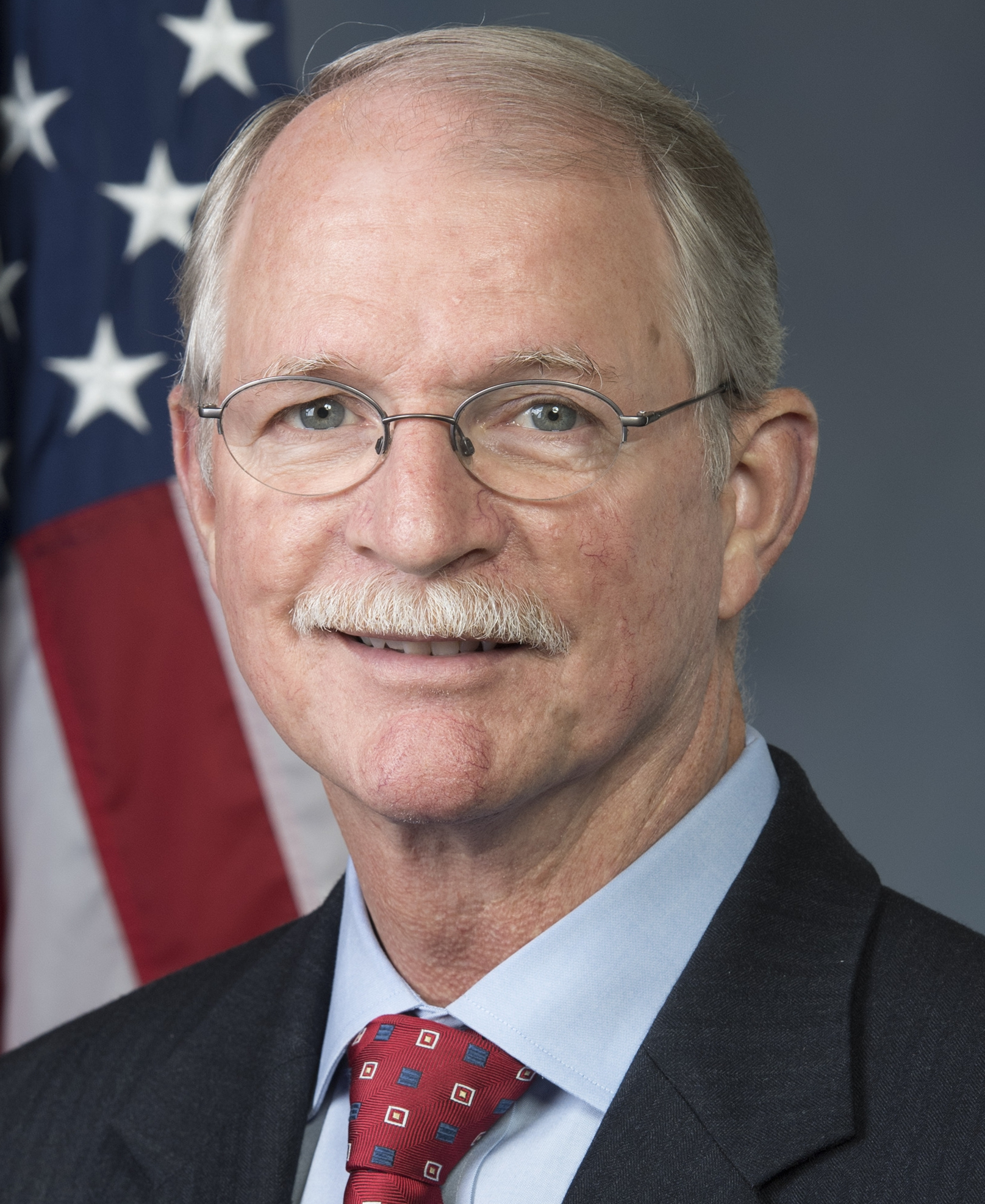

	Majority party	Minority party
Candidate	John Rutherford	Ges Selmont
Party	Republican	Democratic
Popular vote	248,420	123,351
Percentage	65.2%	32.4%
- County results Rutherford: 60–70% 70–80%
U.S. Representative before election
John Rutherford
Republican
Elected U.S. Representative
John Rutherford
Republican

The 4th district is located in the First Coast region and is made up of the Jacksonville metropolitan area including Jacksonville Beach and St. Augustine. Incumbent Republican John Rutherford, who had represented the district since 2017, ran for re-election. He was elected with 70% of the vote in 2016. The district had a PVI of R+17.

=== Republican primary ===
==== Candidates ====
===== Nominee =====
- John Rutherford, incumbent U.S. Representative

===== Withdrawn =====
- Rob Ficker

=== Democratic primary ===
==== Candidates ====
===== Nominee =====
- Ges Selmont, attorney

=== General election ===
==== Predictions ====
Source	Ranking	As of
The Cook Political Report	Safe R	November 5, 2018
Inside Elections	Safe R	November 5, 2018
Sabato's Crystal Ball	Safe R	November 5, 2018
RCP	Safe R	November 5, 2018
Daily Kos	Safe R	November 5, 2018
538	Safe R	November 7, 2018
CNN	Safe R	October 31, 2018
Politico	Safe R	November 4, 2018

==== Endorsements ====
Ges Selmont (D)

Labor unions

- International Brotherhood of Boilermakers

==== Results ====
Florida's 4th congressional district, 2018
Party	Candidate	Votes	%
Republican	John Rutherford (incumbent)	248,420	65.2
Democratic	Ges Selmont	123,351	32.4
Independent	Joceline Berrios	7,155	1.9
Independent	Jason Bulger	2,321	0.6
Write-in		2	0.0
Total votes		381,249	100.0
Republican hold			

== District 5 ==
2018 Florida's 5th congressional district election
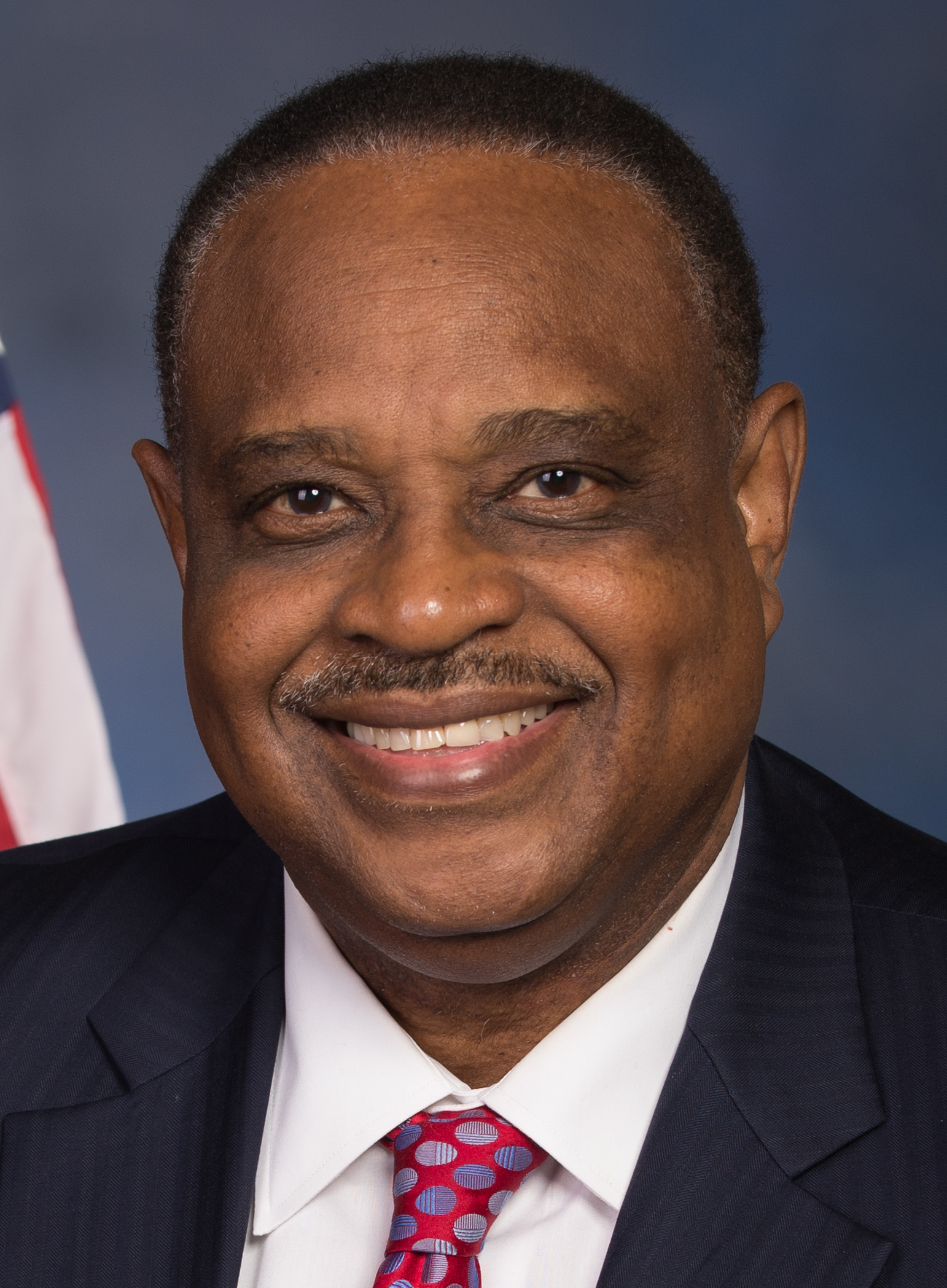

	Majority party	Minority party
Candidate	Al Lawson	Virginia Fuller
Party	Democratic	Republican
Popular vote	180,527	89,799
Percentage	66.8%	33.2%
- County results Lawson: 50–60% 60–70% 70–80% Fuller 50–60% 60–70% 80–90%
U.S. Representative before election
Al Lawson
Democratic
Elected U.S. Representative
Al Lawson
Democratic

The 5th district stretches along the northern border of Florida from the state capital, Tallahassee, to Jacksonville. Incumbent Democrat Al Lawson, who had represented the district since 2017, ran for re-election. He was elected with 64% of the vote in 2016. The district had a PVI of D+12.

=== Democratic primary ===
==== Candidates ====
===== Nominee =====
- Al Lawson, incumbent U.S. Representative

===== Eliminated in primary =====
- Alvin Brown, former mayor of Jacksonville

==== Polling ====
Poll source	Date(s) administered	Sample size	Margin of error	Alvin Brown	Al Lawson	Undecided
University of North Florida	August 17–19, 2018	402	–	29%	48%	23%
St. Pete Polls	August 11–12, 2018	445	± 4.6%	27%	50%	23%

==== Primary results ====
Democratic primary results, Florida 2018
Party	Candidate	Votes	%
Democratic	Al Lawson (incumbent)	53,990	60.3
Democratic	Alvin Brown	35,584	39.7
Total votes		89,574	100.0

=== Republican primary ===
==== Candidates ====
===== Nominee =====
- Virginia Fuller, nurse and perennial candidate

=== General election ===
==== Predictions ====
Source	Ranking	As of
The Cook Political Report	Safe D	November 5, 2018
Inside Elections	Safe D	November 5, 2018
Sabato's Crystal Ball	Safe D	November 5, 2018
RCP	Safe D	November 5, 2018
Daily Kos	Safe D	November 5, 2018
538	Safe D	November 7, 2018
CNN	Safe D	October 31, 2018
Politico	Safe D	November 4, 2018

==== Endorsements ====
Al Lawson (D)

Labor unions

- International Brotherhood of Boilermakers

Organizations

- End Citizens United

==== Results ====
Florida's 5th congressional district, 2018
Party	Candidate	Votes	%
Democratic	Al Lawson (incumbent)	180,527	66.8
Republican	Virginia Fuller	89,799	33.2
Total votes		270,326	100.0
Democratic hold			

== District 6 ==
2018 Florida's 6th congressional district election
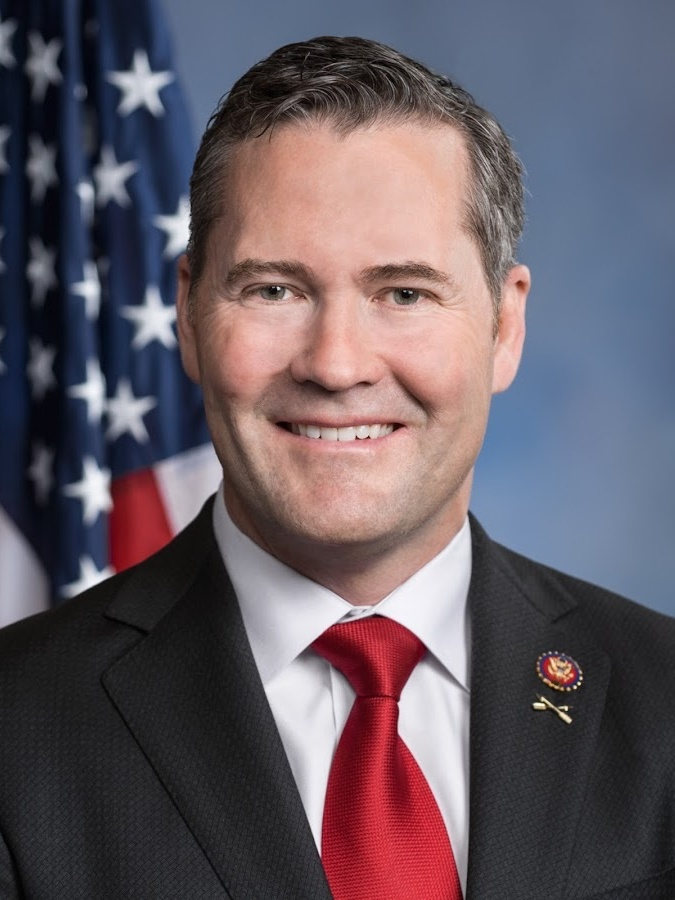

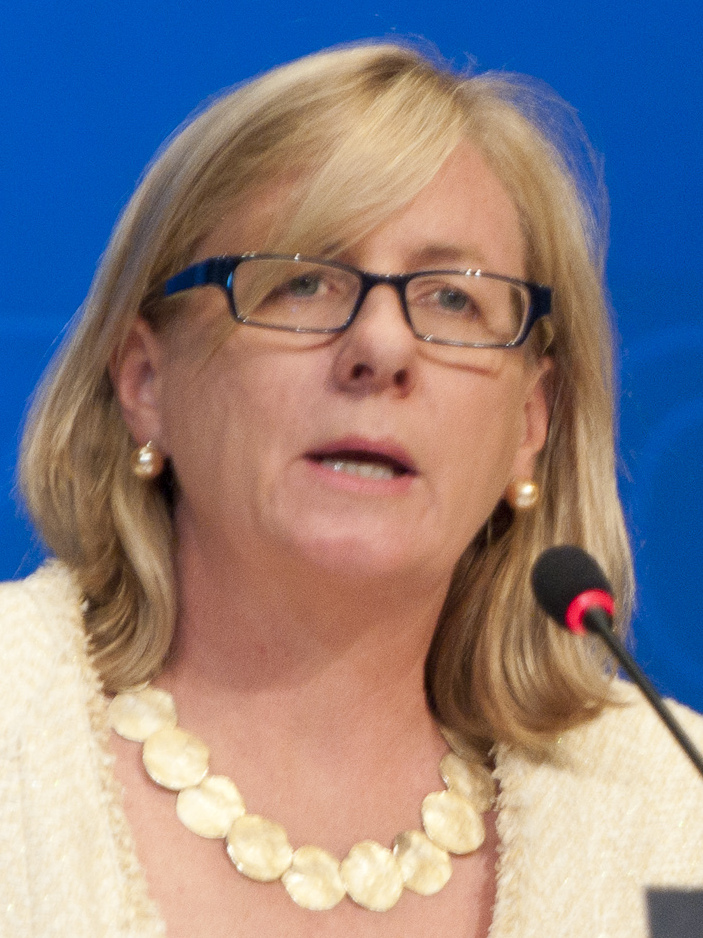
	Majority party	Minority party
Candidate	Mike Waltz	Nancy Soderberg
Party	Republican	Democratic
Popular vote	187,891	145,758
Percentage	56.3%	43.7%
- County results Waltz: 50–60% 60–70%
U.S. Representative before election
Ron DeSantis
Republican
Elected U.S. Representative
Mike Waltz
Republican

The 6th district is located in the Surf Coast region and includes the cities of Daytona Beach, Deltona, and Palm Coast. Incumbent Republican Ron DeSantis, who had represented the district since 2013, was re-elected to a third term with 59% of the vote in 2016. He did not run for re-election in 2018, rather opting to run for governor of Florida. The district had a PVI of R+7.

=== Republican primary ===
==== Candidates ====
===== Nominee =====
- Mike Waltz, former Green Beret

===== Eliminated in primary =====
- Fred Costello, former state representative
- John Ward, businessman

===== Withdrawn =====
- Jimmy Johns, St. Johns County commissioner

==== Endorsements ====
Fred Costello

Statewide officials

- Pam Bondi, Florida Attorney General

State legislators

- Richard Corcoran, speaker of the house of representatives
- José R. Oliva, state representative

Organizations

- ~~NRA Political Victory Fund~~
Mike Waltz

U.S. representatives

- John Rutherford, U.S. Representative for Florida's 4th congressional district

Local officials

- Craig Capri, Daytona Beach police chief
- Lenny Curry, Jacksonville mayor
- Deborah Denys, Volusia County commission vice chair
- David Shoar, St. Johns County sheriff
- Mike Williams, Jacksonville sheriff

==== Polling ====
Poll source	Date(s) administered	Sample size	Margin of error	Fred Costello	Mike Waltz	John Ward	Undecided
St. Pete Polls	August 10, 2018	528	± 4.3%	16%	40%	21%	23%
St. Pete Polls	July 18, 2018	477	± 4.5%	21%	20%	21%	38%

==== Primary results ====
Republican primary results, Florida 2018
Party	Candidate	Votes	%
Republican	Mike Waltz	32,916	42.4
Republican	John Ward	23,593	30.4
Republican	Fred Costello	21,074	27.2
Total votes		77,583	100.0

=== Democratic primary ===
Florida's 6th district is one of the 20 Republican held seats included in the second round of seats targeted by the Democratic Congressional Campaign Committee in 2018.

==== Candidates ====
===== Nominee =====
- Nancy Soderberg, former representative at the United Nations and former deputy national security advisor

===== Eliminated in primary =====
- Stephen Sevigny, radiologist
- John Upchurch, attorney

===== Withdrawn =====
- Robert Coffman, commercial pilot

==== Endorsements ====
Stephen Sevigny

Labor unions

- International Brotherhood of Electrical Workers Local 756
Nancy Soderberg

U.S. executive branch officials

- Joe Biden, 47th Vice President of the United States (2009–2017)

U.S. representatives

- Charlie Crist, U.S. Representative from Florida's 13th congressional district
- Val Demings, U.S. Representative from Florida's 10th congressional district
- Ted Deutch, U.S. Representative from Florida's 22nd congressional district
- Lois Frankel, U.S. Representative from Florida's 21st congressional district
- Darren Soto, U.S. Representative from Florida's 9th congressional district

Labor unions

- AFSCME Florida

Organizations

- Indivisible United Florida 6th district

==== Polling ====
Poll source	Date(s) administered	Sample size	Margin of error	Stephen Sevigny	Nancy Soderberg	John Upchurch	Undecided
St. Pete Polls	August 17, 2018	407	± 4.9%	19%	50%	12%	20%
St. Pete Polls	July 18, 2018	420	± 4.8%	10%	30%	13%	46%

==== Debate ====
2018 Florida's 6th congressional district democratic primary debate
No.	Date	Host	Moderator	Link	Democratic	Democratic	Democratic
Key: P Participant A Absent N Not invited I Invited W Withdrawn							
Key: P Participant A Absent N Not invited I Invited W Withdrawn					Stephen Sevigny	Nancy Soderberg	John Upchurch
1	Aug. 2, 2018	The Daytona Beach News-Journal			P	P	P

==== Primary results ====
Democratic primary results, Florida 2018
Party	Candidate	Votes	%
Democratic	Nancy Soderberg	32,174	55.6
Democratic	John Upchurch	13,088	22.6
Democratic	Stephen Sevigny	12,633	21.8
Total votes		57,895	100.0

=== General election ===
==== Endorsements ====
Mike Waltz (R)

U.S. executive branch officials

- Donald Trump, President of the United States

U.S. representatives

- John Rutherford, U.S. Representative for Florida's 4th congressional district

Organizations

- With Honor Fund

Local officials

- Craig Capri, Daytona Beach police chief
- Lenny Curry, Mayor of Jacksonville
- Deborah Denys, Volusia County commission vice chair
- David Shoar, St. Johns County sheriff
- Mike Williams, Jacksonville sheriff
Nancy Soderberg (D)

U.S. executive branch officials

- Joe Biden, 47th Vice President of the United States (2009–2017)

U.S. representatives

- Charlie Crist, U.S. Representative from Florida's 13th congressional district
- Val Demings, U.S. Representative from Florida's 10th congressional district
- Ted Deutch, U.S. Representative from Florida's 22nd congressional district
- Lois Frankel, U.S. Representative from Florida's 21st congressional district
- Darren Soto, U.S. Representative from Florida's 9th congressional district

Labor unions

- American Federation of State, County and Municipal Employees
- International Brotherhood of Boilermakers

Organizations

- Democratic Congressional Campaign Committee "Red to Blue" Program
- EMILY's List
- End Citizens United
- Indivisible United Florida 6th district
- MoveOn

==== Polling ====
Poll source	Date(s) administered	Sample size	Margin of error	Mike Waltz (R)	Nancy Soderberg (D)	Undecided
GQR Research (D)	October 1–4, 2018	400	± 4.9%	45%	45%	9%
St. Pete Polls	September 19, 2018	730	± 3.6%	47%	43%	10%
GQR Research (D)	September 4–6, 2018	400	± 4.9%	47%	46%	–

==== Debate ====
A debate was scheduled for September 25, but it was cancelled.

2018 Florida's 6th congressional district debate
No.	Date	Host	Moderator	Link	Republican	Democratic
Key: P Participant A Absent N Not invited I Invited W Withdrawn						
Key: P Participant A Absent N Not invited I Invited W Withdrawn					Mike Waltz	Nancy Soderberg
1	Oct. 2, 2018	WESH	Greg Fox		P	P

==== Predictions ====
Source	Ranking	As of
The Cook Political Report	Lean R	November 5, 2018
Inside Elections	Lean R	November 5, 2018
Sabato's Crystal Ball	Lean R	November 5, 2018
RCP	Likely R	November 5, 2018
Daily Kos	Lean R	November 5, 2018
538	Lean R	November 7, 2018
CNN	Likely R	October 31, 2018
Politico	Lean R	November 4, 2018

==== Results ====
Florida's 6th congressional district, 2018
Party	Candidate	Votes	%
Republican	Mike Waltz	187,891	56.3
Democratic	Nancy Soderberg	145,758	43.7
Total votes		333,649	100.0
Republican hold			

== District 7 ==
2018 Florida's 7th congressional district election
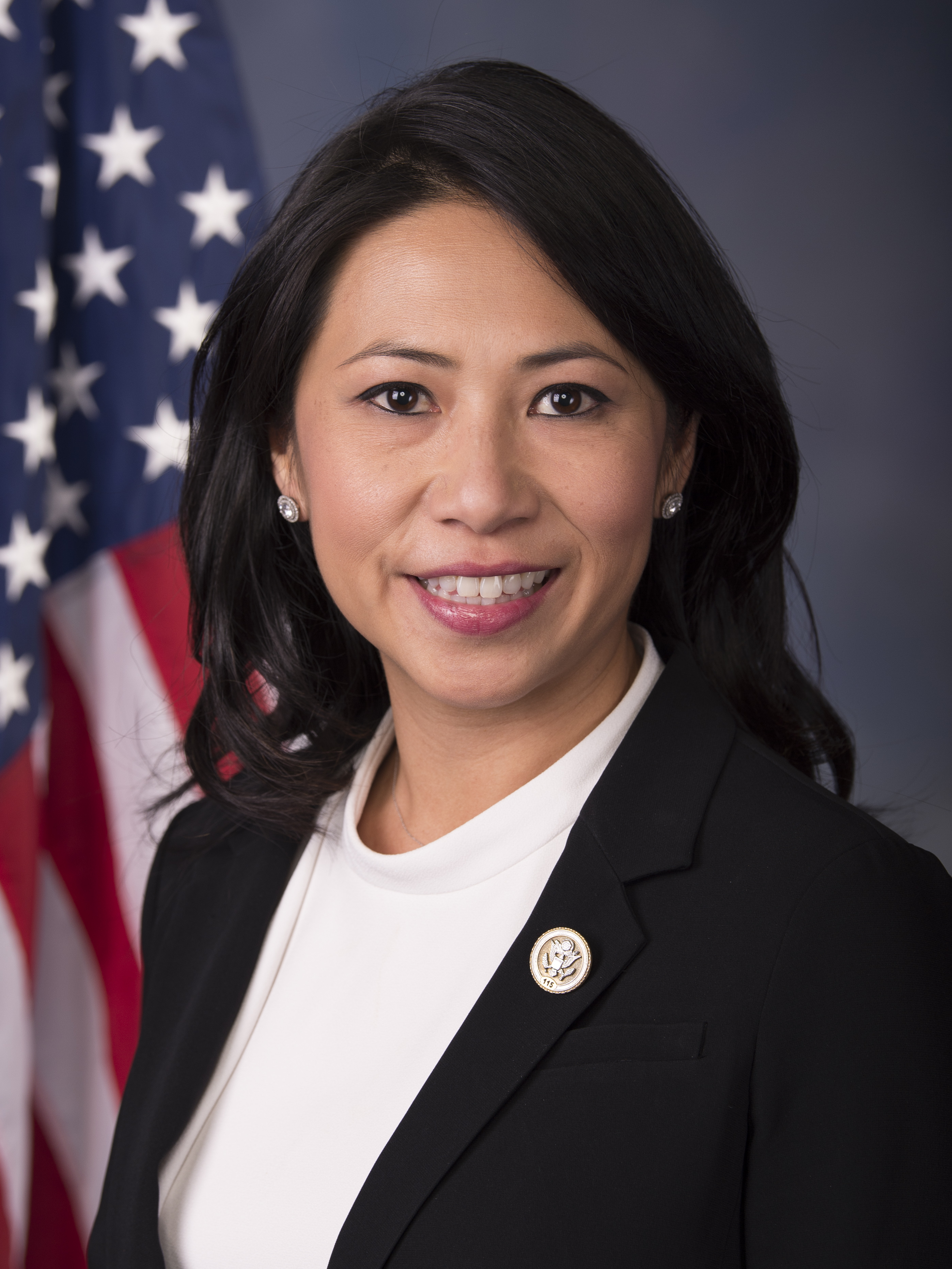

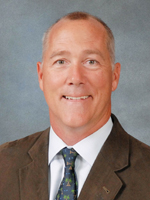
	Majority party	Minority party
Candidate	Stephanie Murphy	Mike Miller
Party	Democratic	Republican
Popular vote	183,113	134,285
Percentage	57.7%	42.3%
- County results Murphy: 50–60% 60–70%
U.S. Representative before election
Stephanie Murphy
Democratic
Elected U.S. Representative
Stephanie Murphy
Democratic

The 7th district is centered around downtown Orlando and the northern Orlando suburbs such as Sanford and Winter Park. Incumbent Democrat Stephanie Murphy, who had represented the district since 2017, ran for re-election. She was elected with 51% of the vote in 2016. The district had a PVI of Even.

=== Democratic primary ===
==== Candidates ====
===== Nominee =====
- Stephanie Murphy, incumbent U.S. Representative

===== Eliminated in primary =====
- Chardo Richardson, former president of the ACLU

==== Endorsements ====
Stephanie Murphy

U.S. executive branch officials

- Joe Biden, 47th Vice President of the United States 2009–2017; U.S. Senator from Delaware 1973–2009; candidate for President in 1988 and in 2008

Labor unions

- AFL–CIO
- Central Florida AFL–CIO
- Florida Education Association

Organizations

- League of Conservation Voters Action Fund
- NARAL Pro-Choice America
Chardo Richardson

Organizations

- Justice Democrats

Individuals

- Alexandria Ocasio-Cortez, educator, community organizer, political activist and nominee for NY-14 in 2018

==== Primary results ====
Democratic primary results, Florida 2018
Party	Candidate	Votes	%
Democratic	Stephanie Murphy (incumbent)	49,060	86.2
Democratic	Chardo Richardson	7,846	13.2
Total votes		56,906	100.0

=== Republican primary ===
==== Candidates ====
===== Nominee =====
- Mike Miller, state representative

===== Eliminated in primary =====
- Vennia Francois, policy advisor
- Scott Sturgill, former Seminole County Soil & Water Conservation District Supervisor and state house candidate in 2014

===== Declined =====
- Bob Cortes, state representative
- Joel Greenberg, Seminole County Tax Collector
- David Simmons, state senator

==== Endorsements ====
Mike Miller

U.S. senators

- Marco Rubio, U.S. Senator (FL)

State legislators

- Jason Brodeur, state representative
- Joe Gruters, state representative
- Rene Plasencia, state representative

Local officials

- Bob Dallari, Seminole County commissioner
- Carlton Henley, Seminole County commissioner
- John Horan, Seminole County commission chairman
Scott Sturgill

U.S. representatives

- Sandy Adams, former U.S. Representative from Florida's 24th congressional district
- John Boehner, former Speaker of the United States House of Representatives (2011–2015), former U.S. representative from Ohio's 8th congressional district (1991–2015)

Statewide officials

- Carlos López-Cantera, Lieutenant Governor of Florida

Local officials

- All five members of the Longwood city commission
- Kevin Beary, former Orange County Sheriff
- Dennis Lemma, Seminole County Sheriff

==== Polling ====
Poll source	Date(s) administered	Sample size	Margin of error	Vennia Francois	Mike Miller	Scott Sturgill	Undecided
St. Pete Polls	August 20, 2018	321	± 5.5%	8%	42%	26%	24%

==== Primary results ====
Republican primary results, Florida 2018
Party	Candidate	Votes	%
Republican	Mike Miller	30,629	53.9
Republican	Scott Sturgill	17,253	30.4
Republican	Vennia Francois	8,950	15.8
Total votes		56,832	100.0

=== General election ===
==== Endorsements ====
Stephanie Murphy (D)

U.S. executive branch officials

- Joe Biden, 47th Vice President of the United States 2009–2017; U.S. Senator from Delaware 1973–2009; candidate for President in 1988 and in 2008

Labor unions

- AFL–CIO
- Central Florida AFL–CIO
- Florida Education Association
- International Brotherhood of Boilermakers

Organizations

- Blue Dog Coalition
- Democratic Congressional Campaign Committee "Frontline" Program
- EMILY's List
- End Citizens United
- League of Conservation Voters Action Fund
- NARAL Pro-Choice America

Individuals

- Mark Kelly, retired astronaut, engineer, and U.S. Navy Captain
Mike Miller (R)

U.S. senators

- Marco Rubio, U.S. Senator (FL)

State legislators

- Jason Brodeur, state representative
- Joe Gruters, state representative
- Rene Plasencia, state representative

Organizations

- National Republican Congressional Committee "Young Guns" Program

Local officials

- Bob Dallari, Seminole County commissioner
- Carlton Henley, Seminole County commissioner
- John Horan, Seminole County commission chair

==== Polling ====
Poll source	Date(s) administered	Sample size	Margin of error	Stephanie Murphy (D)	Mike Miller (R)	Undecided
St. Pete Polls	August 30, 2018	435	± 4.7%	47%	46%	7%

==== Predictions ====
Source	Ranking	As of
The Cook Political Report	Likely D	November 5, 2018
Inside Elections	Likely D	November 5, 2018
Sabato's Crystal Ball	Likely D	November 5, 2018
RCP	Lean D	November 5, 2018
Daily Kos	Likely D	November 5, 2018
538	Likely D	November 7, 2018
CNN	Safe D	October 31, 2018
Politico	Likely D	November 2, 2018

==== Results ====
Florida's 7th congressional district, 2018
Party	Candidate	Votes	%
Democratic	Stephanie Murphy (incumbent)	183,113	57.7
Republican	Mike Miller	134,285	42.3
Total votes		317,398	100.0
Democratic hold			

== District 8 ==
2018 Florida's 8th congressional district election
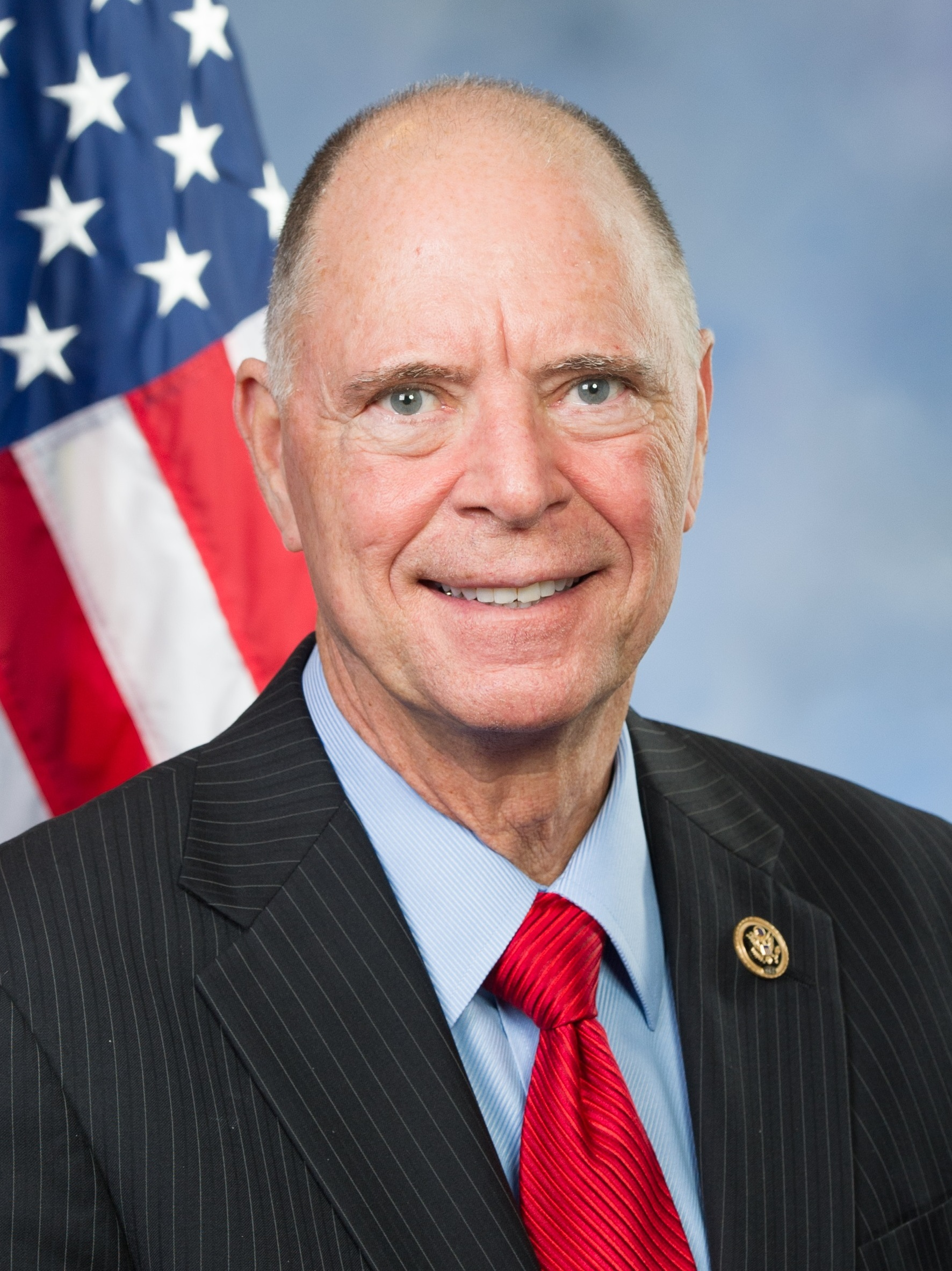

	Majority party	Minority party
Candidate	Bill Posey	Sanjay Patel
Party	Republican	Democratic
Popular vote	218,112	142,415
Percentage	60.5%	39.5%
- County results Posey: 50–60% 60–70%
U.S. Representative before election
Bill Posey
Republican
Elected U.S. Representative
Bill Posey
Republican

The 8th district includes the Space Coast region and the cities of Melbourne, Palm Bay, and Vero Beach. Incumbent Republican Bill Posey, who had represented the district since 2013 and previously represented the 15th district from 2009 to 2013, ran for re-election. He was re-elected to a fifth term with 63% of the vote in 2016. The district had a PVI of R+11.

=== Republican primary ===
==== Candidates ====
===== Nominee =====
- Bill Posey, incumbent U.S. Representative

=== Democratic primary ===
==== Candidates ====
===== Nominee =====
- Sanjay Patel, management consultant

=== General election ===
==== Endorsements ====
Sanjay Patel (D)

Labor unions

- International Brotherhood of Boilermakers

Organizations

- Justice Democrats
- Our Revolution

==== Predictions ====
Source	Ranking	As of
The Cook Political Report	Safe R	November 5, 2018
Inside Elections	Safe R	November 5, 2018
Sabato's Crystal Ball	Safe R	November 5, 2018
RCP	Safe R	November 5, 2018
Daily Kos	Safe R	November 5, 2018
538	Safe R	November 7, 2018
CNN	Safe R	October 31, 2018
Politico	Safe R	November 4, 2018

Florida's 8th congressional district, 2018
Party	Candidate	Votes	%
Republican	Bill Posey (incumbent)	218,112	60.5
Democratic	Sanjay Patel	142,415	39.5
Total votes		360,527	100.0
Republican hold			

== District 9 ==
2018 Florida's 9th congressional district election
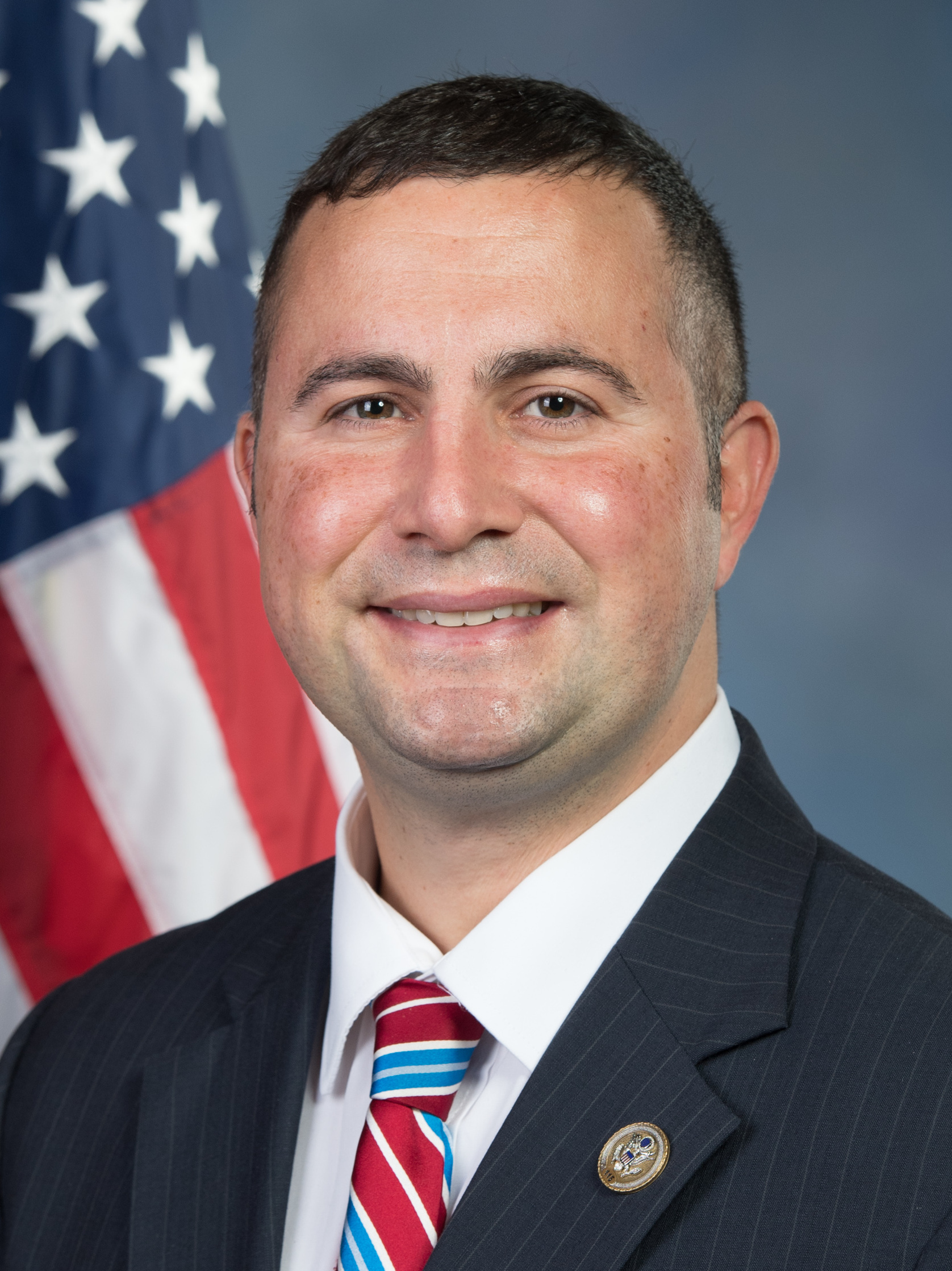

	Majority party	Minority party
Candidate	Darren Soto	Wayne Liebnitzky
Party	Democratic	Republican
Popular vote	172,172	124,565
Percentage	58.0%	42.0%
- County results Soto: 60–70% Liebnitzky: 50–60%
U.S. Representative before election
Darren Soto
Democratic
Elected U.S. Representative
Darren Soto
Democratic

The 9th district is located in inland Central Florida including Kissimmee, St. Cloud, and Winter Haven. Incumbent Democrat Darren Soto, who had represented the district since 2017, ran for re-election. He was elected with 57% of the vote in 2016. The district had a PVI of D+5.

=== Democratic primary ===
==== Candidates ====
===== Nominee =====
- Darren Soto, incumbent U.S. Representative

===== Eliminated in primary =====
- Alan Grayson, former U.S. Representative

==== Endorsements ====
Darren Soto

Organizations

- Congressional Progressive Caucus PAC

==== Polling ====
Poll source	Date(s) administered	Sample size	Margin of error	Alan Grayson	Darren Soto	Undecided
SurveyUSA	August 2–6, 2018	512	± 5.4%	38%	45%	17%

==== Primary results ====
Democratic primary results, Florida 2018
Party	Candidate	Votes	%
Democratic	Darren Soto (incumbent)	36,586	66.4
Democratic	Alan Grayson	18,528	33.6
Total votes		55,114	100.0

=== Republican primary ===
==== Candidates ====
===== Nominee =====
- Wayne Liebnitzky, engineer and nominee for this seat in 2016

=== General election ===
==== Predictions ====
Source	Ranking	As of
The Cook Political Report	Safe D	November 5, 2018
Inside Elections	Safe D	November 5, 2018
Sabato's Crystal Ball	Safe D	November 5, 2018
RCP	Safe D	November 5, 2018
Daily Kos	Safe D	November 5, 2018
538	Safe D	November 7, 2018
CNN	Safe D	October 31, 2018
Politico	Safe D	November 4, 2018

==== Debate ====
2018 Florida's 9th congressional district debate
No.	Date	Host	Moderator	Link	Democratic	Republican
Key: P Participant A Absent N Not invited I Invited W Withdrawn						
Key: P Participant A Absent N Not invited I Invited W Withdrawn					Darren Soto	Wayne Liebnitzky
1	Oct. 21, 2018	WESH	Greg Fox	YouTube	P	P

==== Endorsements ====
Darren Soto (D)

Labor unions

- International Brotherhood of Boilermakers

Organizations

- Congressional Progressive Caucus
- End Citizens United

==== Polling ====
Poll source	Date(s) administered	Sample size	Margin of error	Darren Soto (D)	Wayne Liebnitzky (R)	Undecided
SurveyUSA	October 2–7, 2018	535	± 6.4%	48%	40%	11%

==== Results ====
Florida's 9th congressional district, 2018
Party	Candidate	Votes	%
Democratic	Darren Soto (incumbent)	172,172	58.0
Republican	Wayne Liebnitzky	124,565	42.0
Total votes		296,737	100.0
Democratic hold			

== District 10 ==
2018 Florida's 10th congressional district election
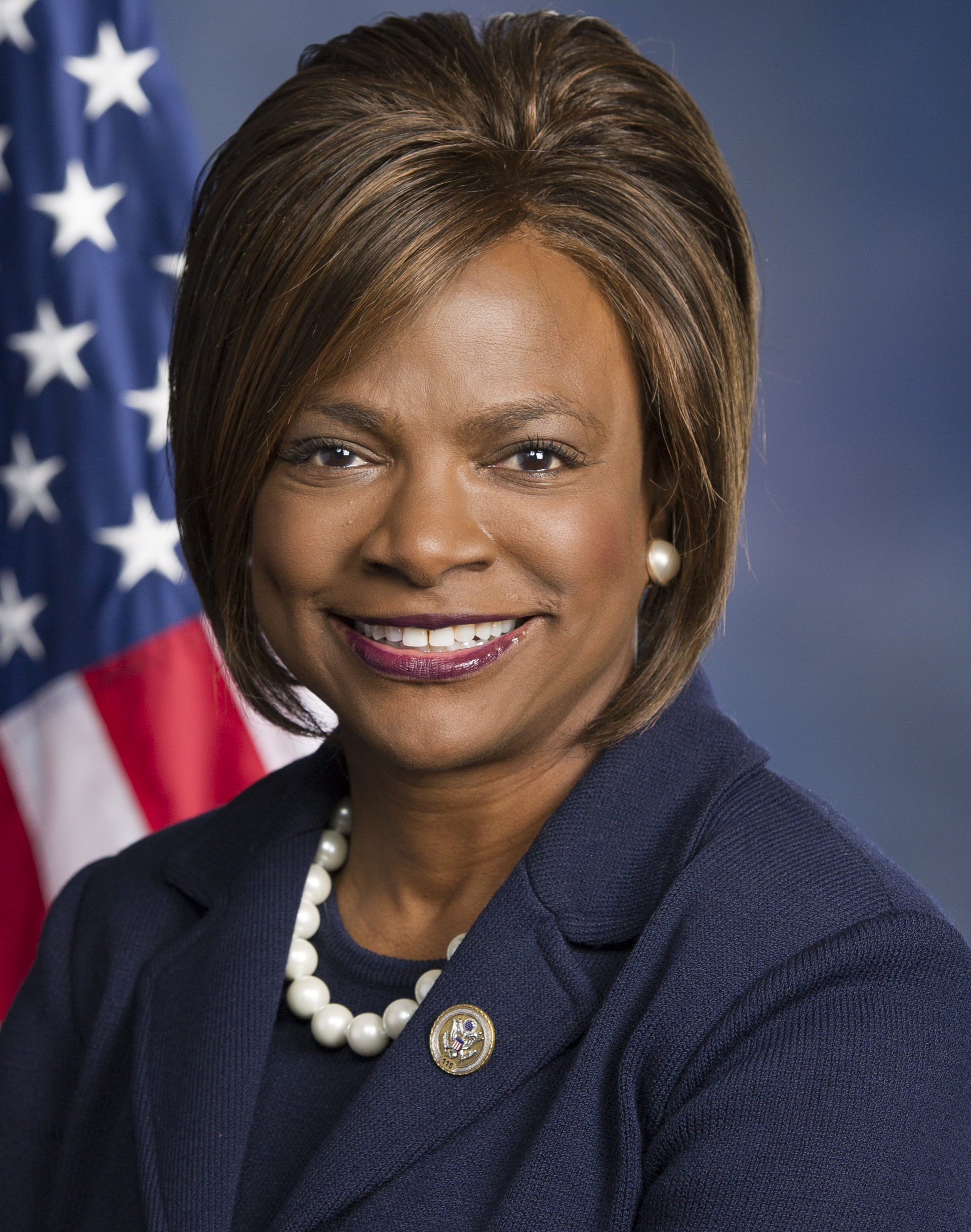
	Majority party
Candidate	Val Demings
Party	Democratic
Popular vote	Unopposed
Percentage	N/a
U.S. Representative before election
Val Demings
Democratic
Elected U.S. Representative
Val Demings
Democratic

The 10th district is centered around Orlando and the surrounding suburbs such as Lockhart, Oak Ridge, and Zellwood. Incumbent Democrat Val Demings, who had represented the district since 2017, ran for re-election. She was elected with 65% of the vote in 2016. The district had a PVI of D+11.

=== Democratic primary ===
Because no write-in candidates or candidates of other parties filed to run in this district, the Democratic primary was open to all voters.

==== Candidates ====
===== Nominee =====
- Val Demings, incumbent U.S. Representative

===== Eliminated in primary =====
- Wade Darius, businessman

==== Primary results ====
Democratic primary results
Party	Candidate	Votes	%
Democratic	Val Demings (incumbent)	73,601	75.0
Democratic	Wade Darius	24,534	25.0
Total votes		98,135	100.0

=== Republican primary ===
No Republicans filed.

=== General election ===
==== Predictions ====
Source	Ranking	As of
The Cook Political Report	Safe D	November 5, 2018
Inside Elections	Safe D	November 5, 2018
Sabato's Crystal Ball	Safe D	November 5, 2018
RCP	Safe D	November 5, 2018
Daily Kos	Safe D	November 5, 2018
538	Safe D	November 7, 2018
CNN	Safe D	October 31, 2018
Politico	Safe D	November 4, 2018

Incumbent Val Demings ran unopposed in the general election. As such, no election for the position was held, and Demings was declared the winner automatically by the Board of Elections for the State of Florida.

==== Endorsements ====
Val Demings (D)

Labor unions

- International Brotherhood of Boilermakers

Organizations

- Congressional Progressive Caucus
- End Citizens United

==== Results ====
Florida's 10th congressional district, 2018
Party	Candidate	Votes	%
Democratic	Val Demings (incumbent)	Unopposed	N/a
Total votes			N/a
Democratic hold			

== District 11 ==
2018 Florida's 11th congressional district election
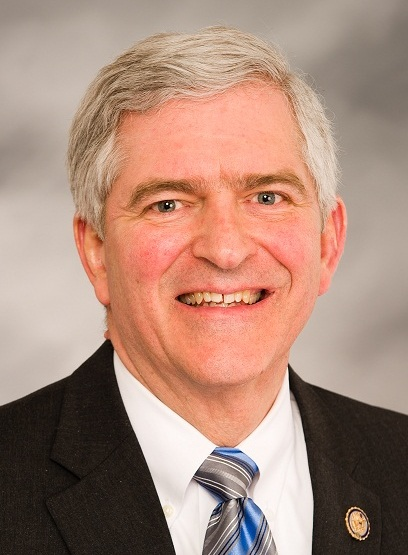

	Majority party	Minority party
Candidate	Daniel Webster	Dana Cottrell
Party	Republican	Democratic
Popular vote	239,395	128,053
Percentage	65.2%	34.8%
- County results Webster: 60–70%
U.S. Representative before election
Daniel Webster
Republican
Elected U.S. Representative
Daniel Webster
Republican

The 11th district is located in Central Florida and includes the southern suburbs of Ocala and Spring Hill, this district also includes the retirement community known as The Villages. Incumbent Republican Daniel Webster, who had represented the district since 2017 and previously represented the 8th district from 2011 to 2013 and the 10th district from 2013 to 2017, ran for re-election. He was re-elected to a fourth term with 65% of the vote in 2016. The district had a PVI of R+15.

=== Republican primary ===
==== Candidates ====
===== Nominee =====
- Daniel Webster, incumbent U.S. Representative

=== Democratic primary ===
==== Candidates ====
===== Nominee =====
- Dana Cottrell, teacher

=== General election ===
==== Predictions ====
Source	Ranking	As of
The Cook Political Report	Safe R	November 5, 2018
Inside Elections	Safe R	November 5, 2018
Sabato's Crystal Ball	Safe R	November 5, 2018
RCP	Safe R	November 5, 2018
Daily Kos	Safe R	November 5, 2018
538	Safe R	November 7, 2018
CNN	Safe R	October 31, 2018
Politico	Safe R	November 4, 2018

==== Results ====
Florida's 11th congressional district, 2018
Party	Candidate	Votes	%
Republican	Daniel Webster (incumbent)	239,395	65.2
Democratic	Dana Cottrell	128,053	34.8
Independent	Luis Saldana (write-in)	58	0.0
Total votes		367,506	100.0
Republican hold			

== District 12 ==
2018 Florida's 12th congressional district election
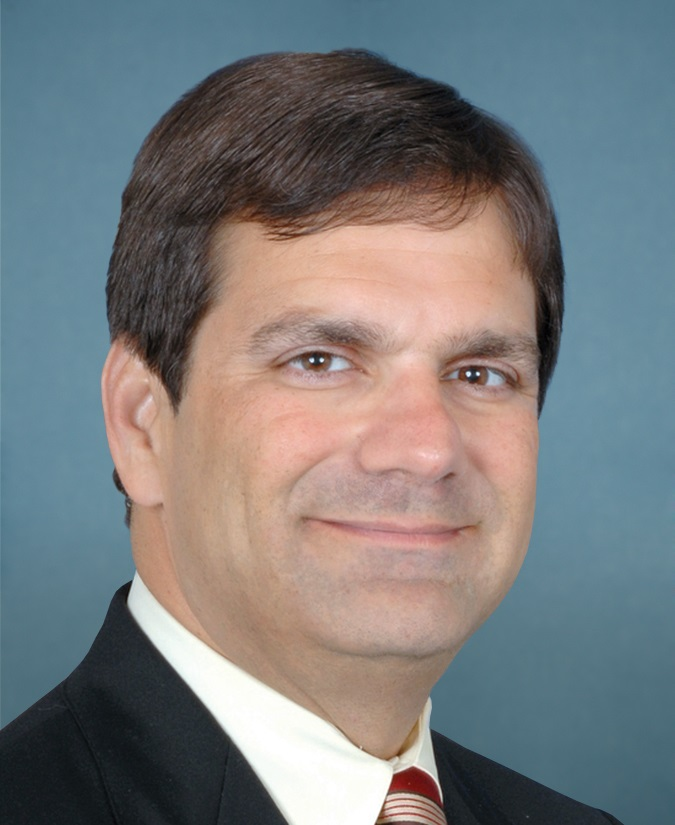

	Majority party	Minority party
Candidate	Gus Bilirakis	Chris Hunter
Party	Republican	Democratic
Popular vote	194,564	132,844
Percentage	58.1%	39.7%
- County results Bilirakis: 50–60% 60–70%
U.S. Representative before election
Gus Bilirakis
Republican
Elected U.S. Representative
Gus Bilirakis
Republican

The 12th district is located in the Tampa Bay Area and includes Dade City, New Port Richey, and Palm Harbor. Incumbent Republican Gus Bilirakis, who had represented the district since 2013 and previously represented the 9th district from 2007 to 2013, was re-elected to a sixth term with 69% of the vote in 2016. The district had a PVI of R+8.

=== Republican primary ===
==== Candidates ====
===== Nominee =====
- Gus Bilirakis, incumbent U.S. Representative

=== Democratic primary ===
==== Candidates ====
===== Nominee =====
- Chris Hunter, former federal prosecutor

===== Eliminated in primary =====
- Stephen Perenich, tax preparer
- Robert Tager, attorney and nominee for this seat in 2016

==== Primary results ====
Democratic primary results
Party	Candidate	Votes	%
Democratic	Chris Hunter	31,761	65.3
Democratic	Stephen Perenich	9,303	19.1
Democratic	Robert Tager	7,597	15.6
Total votes		48,661	100.0

=== General election ===
==== Predictions ====
Source	Ranking	As of
The Cook Political Report	Safe R	November 5, 2018
Inside Elections	Safe R	November 5, 2018
Sabato's Crystal Ball	Safe R	November 5, 2018
RCP	Safe R	November 5, 2018
Daily Kos	Safe R	November 5, 2018
538	Safe R	November 7, 2018
CNN	Safe R	October 31, 2018
Politico	Safe R	November 4, 2018

==== Endorsements ====
Chris Hunter (D)

Organizations

- Blue Dog Coalition

==== Polling ====
Poll source	Date(s) administered	Sample size	Margin of error	Gus Bilirakis (R)	Christopher Hunter (D)	Undecided
St. Pete Polls	July 28, 2018	615	± 4.0%	49%	30%	21%

==== Results ====
Florida's 12th congressional district, 2018
Party	Candidate	Votes	%
Republican	Gus Bilirakis (incumbent)	194,564	58.1
Democratic	Chris Hunter	132,844	39.7
Independent	Angelika Purkis	7,510	2.2
Total votes		334,918	100.0
Republican hold			

== District 13 ==
2018 Florida's 13th congressional district election
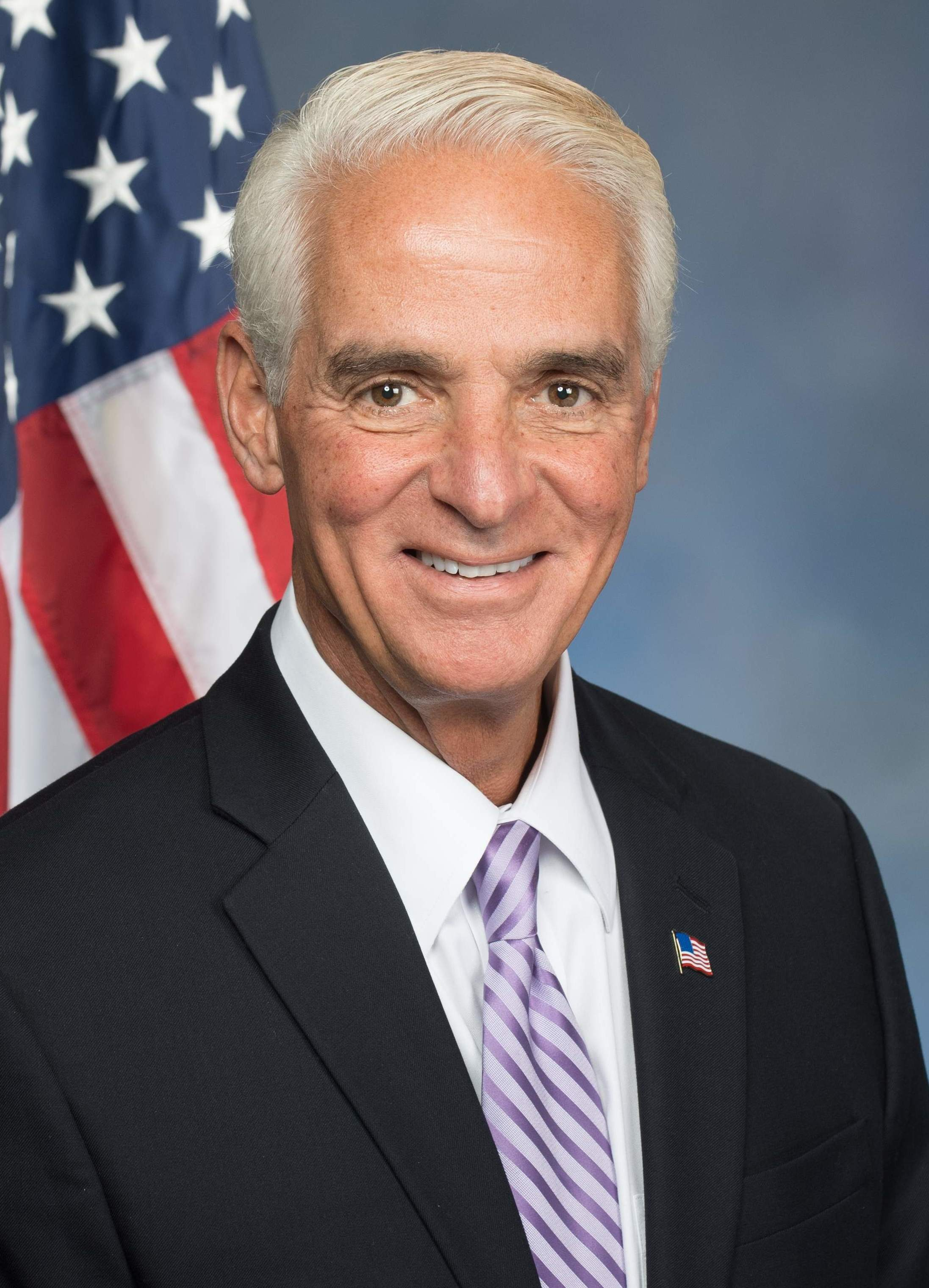

	Majority party	Minority party
Candidate	Charlie Crist	George Buck
Party	Democratic	Republican
Popular vote	182,717	134,254
Percentage	57.6%	42.4%
- Precinct results Crist: 50–60% 60–70% 70–80% 80–90% >90% Buck: 50–60% 60–70% >90% Tie: 50%
U.S. Representative before election
Charlie Crist
Democratic
Elected U.S. Representative
Charlie Crist
Democratic

The 13th district is located in the Tampa Bay Area and includes Clearwater, Largo and Saint Petersburg. Incumbent Democrat Charlie Crist, who had represented the district since 2017, ran for re-election. He was elected with 52% of the vote in 2016. The district had a PVI of D+2.

=== Democratic primary ===
==== Candidates ====
===== Nominee =====
- Charlie Crist, incumbent U.S. Representative

=== Republican primary ===
==== Candidates ====
===== Nominee =====
- George Buck, educator

===== Eliminated in primary =====
- Brad Sostack, navy veteran

==== Primary results ====
Republican primary results
Party	Candidate	Votes	%
Republican	George Buck	30,560	56.0
Republican	Brad Sostack	24,013	44.0
Total votes		54,573	100.0

=== General election ===
==== Endorsements ====
Charlie Crist (D)

Labor unions

- International Brotherhood of Boilermakers

Organizations

- Blue Dog Coalition
- Democratic Congressional Campaign Committee "Frontline" Program
- End Citizens United

==== Predictions ====
Source	Ranking	As of
The Cook Political Report	Safe D	November 5, 2018
Inside Elections	Safe D	November 5, 2018
Sabato's Crystal Ball	Safe D	November 5, 2018
RCP	Likely D	November 5, 2018
Daily Kos	Safe D	November 5, 2018
538	Safe D	November 7, 2018
CNN	Safe D	October 31, 2018
Politico	Likely D	November 2, 2018

==== Results ====
Florida's 13th congressional district, 2018
Party	Candidate	Votes	%
Democratic	Charlie Crist (incumbent)	182,717	57.6
Republican	George Buck	134,254	42.4
Total votes		316,971	100.0
Democratic hold			

== District 14 ==
2018 Florida's 14th congressional district election
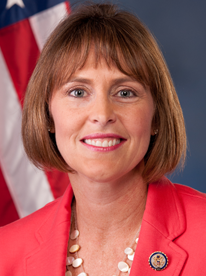
	Majority party
Candidate	Kathy Castor
Party	Democratic
Popular vote	Unopposed
Percentage	N/a
U.S. Representative before election
Kathy Castor
Democratic
Elected U.S. Representative
Kathy Castor
Democratic

The 14th district is centred around the city of Tampa and the immediate surrounding suburbs such as Lutz and Temple Terrace. Incumbent Democrat Kathy Castor, who had represented the district since 2013 and previously represented the 11th district from 2007 to 2013, ran for re-election. She was re-elected to a sixth term with 62% of the vote in 2016. The district had a PVI of D+7.

Castor was the only candidate in 2018, and so was unopposed in the Democratic primary and general election.

=== Democratic primary ===
==== Candidates ====
===== Nominee =====
- Kathy Castor, incumbent U.S. Representative

=== Republican primary ===
No Republicans filed.

=== General election ===
==== Predictions ====
Source	Ranking	As of
The Cook Political Report	Safe D	November 5, 2018
Inside Elections	Safe D	November 5, 2018
Sabato's Crystal Ball	Safe D	November 5, 2018
RCP	Safe D	November 5, 2018
Daily Kos	Safe D	November 5, 2018
538	Safe D	November 7, 2018
CNN	Safe D	October 31, 2018
Politico	Safe D	November 4, 2018

Incumbent Kathy Castor ran unopposed in the general election. As such, no election for the position was held, and Castor was declared the winner automatically by the Board of Elections for the State of Florida.

==== Endorsements ====
Kathy Castor (D)

Labor unions

- International Brotherhood of Boilermakers

==== Results ====
Florida's 14th congressional district, 2018
Party	Candidate	Votes	%
Democratic	Kathy Castor (incumbent)	Unopposed	N/a
Total votes			N/a
Democratic hold			

== District 15 ==
2018 Florida's 15th congressional district election
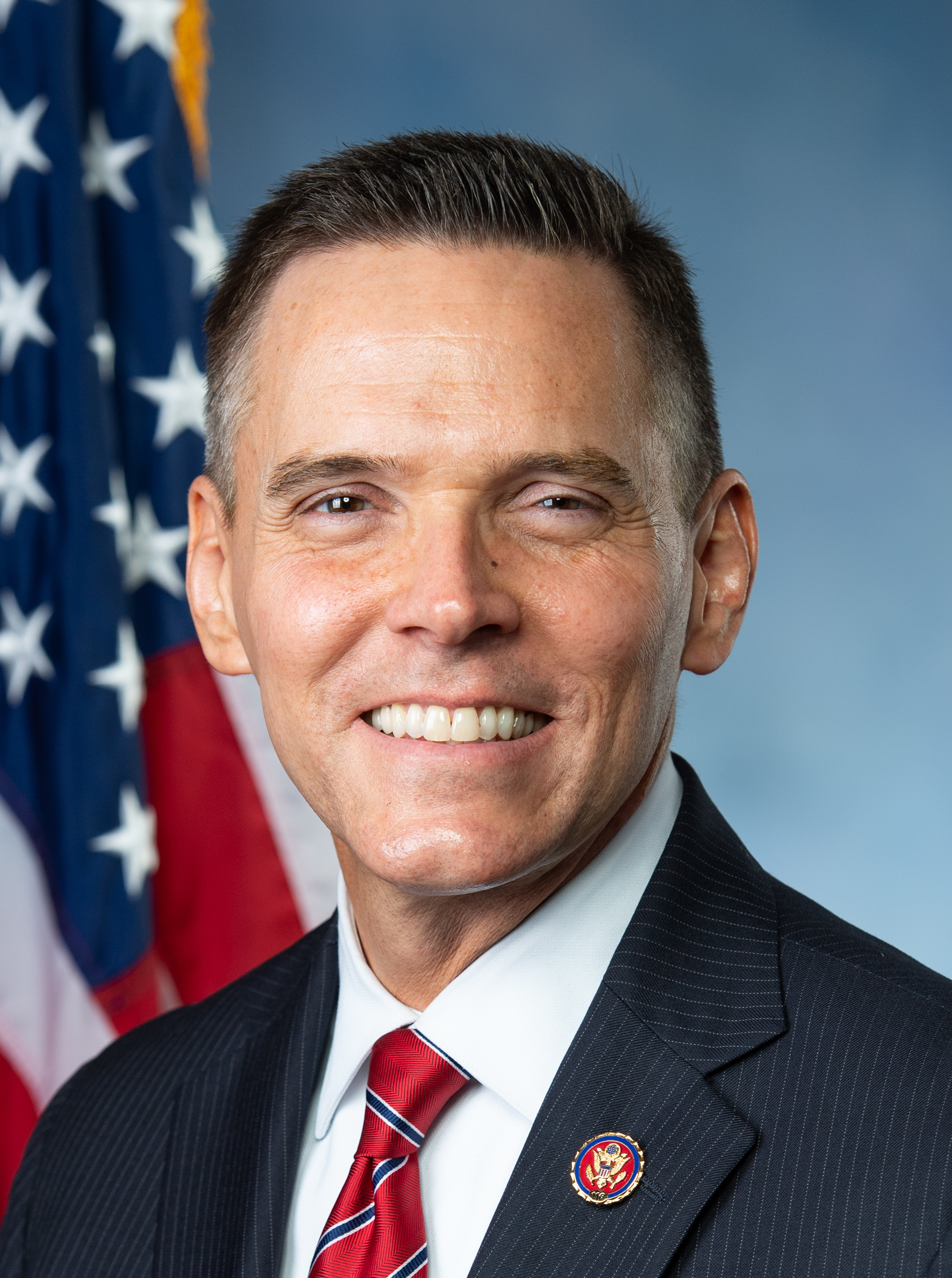

	Majority party	Minority party
Candidate	Ross Spano	Kristen Carlson
Party	Republican	Democratic
Popular vote	151,380	134,132
Percentage	53.0%	47.0%
- County results Spano: 50–60%
U.S. Representative before election
Dennis Ross
Republican
Elected U.S. Representative
Ross Spano
Republican

The 15th district is located in inland Central Florida and is anchored by Lakeland. The district also includes the eastern suburbs of Tampa such as Brandon and Riverview. Incumbent Republican Dennis Ross, who had represented the district since 2013 and previously represented the 12th district from 2011 to 2013, was retiring.

=== Republican primary ===
==== Nominee ====
- Ross Spano, state representative for the 59th District

==== Eliminated in primary ====
- Neil Combee, former state representative for the 39th District
- Sean Harper, contractor
- Danny Kushmer, non-profit executive
- Ed Shoemaker, conservative activist

==== Withdrew ====
- Loretta "Leah Lax" Miller, former IDF officer
- Curt Rogers
- Dennis Ross, incumbent U.S. Representative

==== Declined ====
- Ben Albritton, state representative for the 56th district
- Scott Franklin, Lakeland City Commissioner
- Grady Judd, Sheriff of Polk County
- Tom Lee, state senator for the 20th district, former president of the State Senate and nominee for chief financial officer in 2006
- Seth McKeel, former state representative for the 40th district
- Kelli Stargel, state senator for the 22nd district

==== Endorsements ====
Neil Combee

State legislators

- Ben Albritton, State Representative from Florida (District 56) 2010–present
- J. D. Alexander, State Senator from Florida (District 17) 2002–2012
- Mike La Rosa, State Representative from Florida (District 42) 2012–present
- John Wood, State Representative from Florida (District 41) 2008–present

Newspapers

- Tampa Bay Times (primary only)
Declined to endorse

U.S. representatives

- Dennis Ross, incumbent U.S. Representative from FL-15 2011–present (endorsed Spano in general election)

Sheriffs

- Grady Judd, Sheriff of Polk County 2005–present (endorsed Spano in general election)

==== Polling ====
Poll source	Date(s) administered	Sample size	Margin of error	Neil Combee	Sean Harper	Danny Kushmer	Ed Shoemaker	Ross Spano	Other	Undecided
St. Pete Polls	August 24, 2018	404	± 4.9%	32%	6%	5%	8%	30%	–	20%
St. Pete Polls	August 11–12, 2018	360	± 5.2%	36%	4%	4%	5%	30%	–	22%
Strategic Government Consulting	August 7–8, 2018	508	± 4.3%	31%	4%	3%	4%	17%	–	40%
SurveyUSA	July 25–30, 2018	524	± 6.0%	20%	6%	7%	7%	26%	–	34%
St. Pete Polls	July 8, 2018	532	± 4.2%	20%	3%	2%	4%	32%	2%	37%
St. Pete Polls	May 25–27, 2018	494	± 4.4%	23%	4%	4%	4%	29%	2%	34%

==== Primary results ====
Republican primary results
Party	Candidate	Votes	%
Republican	Ross Spano	26,868	44.1
Republican	Neil Combee	20,577	33.8
Republican	Sean Harper	6,013	9.9
Republican	Danny Kushmer	4,061	6.7
Republican	Ed Shoemaker	3,377	5.5
Total votes		60,896	100.0

=== Democratic primary ===
==== Candidates ====
===== Nominee =====
- Kristen Carlson, attorney

===== Eliminated in primary =====
- Andrew Learned, naval reserve officer
- Ray Pena, retired police officer

==== Polling ====
Poll source	Date(s) administered	Sample size	Margin of error	Kristen Carlson	Andrew Learned	Ray Peña	Other	Undecided
SurveyUSA	July 25–30, 2018	535	± 6.1%	31%	12%	12%	–	46%
GQR Research (D-Carlson)	June 14–17, 2018	401	± 4.9%	25%	14%	10%	6%	45%

==== Primary results ====
Democratic primary results
Party	Candidate	Votes	%
Democratic	Kristen Carlson	24,470	53.4
Democratic	Andrew P. Learned	14,488	31.6
Democratic	Raymond "Ray" Peña	6,895	15.0
Total votes		45,853	100.0

=== General election ===
==== Endorsements ====
Ross Spano (R)

U.S. senators

- Marco Rubio, U.S. Senator from Florida 2011–present; candidate for president in 2016

U.S. representatives

- Dennis Ross, incumbent U.S. Representative from FL-15 2011–present

Statewide officials

- Pam Bondi, Attorney General of Florida 2011–present

State legislators

- Jake Raburn, State Representative from Florida (District 57) 2012–present

Sheriffs

- Grady Judd, Sheriff of Polk County 2005–present
Kristen Carlson (D)

Labor unions

- International Brotherhood of Boilermakers

Organizations

- Democratic Congressional Campaign Committee "Red to Blue" Program
- EMILY's List
- End Citizens United

==== Fundraising ====
Campaign finance reports as of Oct 17, 2018
Candidate (party)	Total receipts	Total disbursements	Cash on hand
Kristen Carlson (D)	$1,306,227	$1,065,973	$240,254
Ross Spano (R)	$587,719	$519,283	$68,435
Source: Federal Election Commission

==== Polling ====
Poll source	Date(s) administered	Sample size	Margin of error	Ross Spano (R)	Kristen Carlson (D)	Other	Undecided
St. Pete Polls	November 5, 2018	1,194	± 2.8%	46%	44%	–	9%
NYT Upshot/Siena College	October 16–19, 2018	499	± 4.7%	43%	43%	–	14%
Remington (R)	October 17–18, 2018	1,369	± 2.64%	47%	41%	–	12%
GQR Research (D-Carlson)	October 16–18, 2018	400	± 4.9%	47%	47%	–	6%
SurveyUSA	October 9–14, 2018	591	± 4.6%	45%	45%	3% (Note: "Another candidate with 3%)	7%
WPA Intelligence (R)	October 3–4, 2018	418	± 4.9%	46%	39%	–	15%
Bold Blue Campaigns (D)	September 22–27, 2018	500	± 4.5%	49%	46%	–	5%
GQR Research (D-Carlson)	September 4–8, 2018	400	± 4.9%	47%	48%	–	–

==== Predictions ====
Source	Ranking	As of
The Cook Political Report	Tossup	November 5, 2018
Inside Elections	Tilt R	November 5, 2018
Sabato's Crystal Ball	Lean R	November 5, 2018
RCP	Tossup	November 5, 2018
Daily Kos	Lean R	November 5, 2018
538	Tossup	November 7, 2018
CNN	Tossup	October 31, 2018
Politico	Lean R	November 2, 2018

==== Results ====
Florida's 15th congressional district, 2018
Party	Candidate	Votes	%
Republican	Ross Spano	151,380	53.0
Democratic	Kristen Carlson	134,132	47.0
Independent	Dave Johnson (write-in)	15	0.0
Independent	Jeffrey G. Rabinowitz (write-in)	3	0.0
Independent	Alek Bynzar (write-in)	2	0.0
Total votes		285,532	100.0
Republican hold			

== District 16 ==
2018 Florida's 16th congressional district election
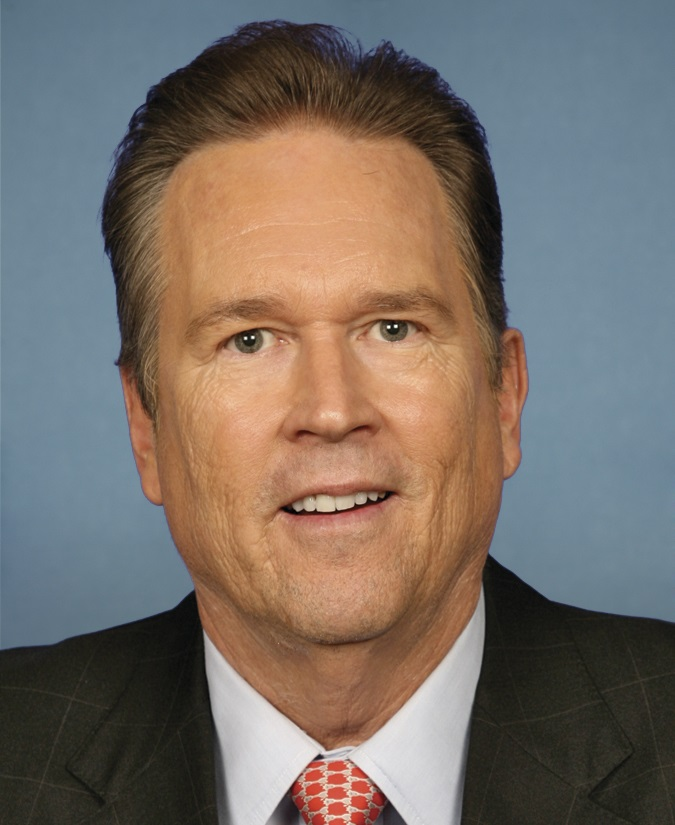

	Majority party	Minority party
Candidate	Vern Buchanan	David Shapiro
Party	Republican	Democratic
Popular vote	197,483	164,463
Percentage	54.6%	45.4%
- County results Buchanan: 50–60%
U.S. Representative before election
Vern Buchanan
Republican
Elected U.S. Representative
Vern Buchanan
Republican

The 16th district is located in the Suncoast region and includes Bradenton, Sarasota, and some Tampa suburbs such as FishHawk. Incumbent Republican Vern Buchanan, who had represented the district since 2013 and previously represented the 13th district from 2007 to 2013, ran for re-election. He was re-elected to a sixth term with 60% of the vote in 2016. The district had a PVI of R+7.

=== Republican primary ===
==== Candidates ====
===== Nominee =====
- Vern Buchanan, incumbent U.S. Representative

=== Democratic primary ===
Florida's 16th district is one of the 20 Republican held seats included in the second round of seats targeted by the Democratic Congressional Campaign Committee in 2018.

==== Candidates ====
===== Nominee =====
- David Shapiro, attorney

===== Eliminated in primary =====
- Jan Schneider, attorney

==== Primary results ====
Democratic primary results
Party	Candidate	Votes	%
Democratic	David Shapiro	34,787	54.7
Democratic	Jan Schneider	28,811	45.3
Total votes		63,598	100.0

=== General election ===
==== Debate ====
2018 Florida's 26th congressional district debate
No.	Date	Host	Moderator	Link	Republican	Democratic
Key: P Participant A Absent N Not invited I Invited W Withdrawn						
Key: P Participant A Absent N Not invited I Invited W Withdrawn					Vern Buchanan	David Shapiro
1	Oct. 23, 2018	WWSB-TV	Alan Cohn		P	P

==== Endorsements ====
David Shapiro (D)

Labor unions

- International Brotherhood of Boilermakers

Organizations

- Democratic Congressional Campaign Committee "Red to Blue" Program
- End Citizens United

==== Polling ====
Poll source	Date(s) administered	Sample size	Margin of error	Vern Buchanan (R)	David Shapiro (D)	Undecided
Public Opinion Strategies (R)	October 4–7, 2018	400	± 4.9%	52%	42%	5%
University of North Florida	September 30 – October 2, 2018	499	–	49%	40%	11%
St. Pete Polls	October 1, 2018	1,248	± 2.8%	50%	43%	6%
ALG Research (D-Shapiro)	August 22–26, 2018	400	± 4.9%	48%	44%	–
St. Pete Polls	July 28, 2018	681	± 3.8%	44%	35%	22%
Public Policy Polling (D)	April 16–17, 2018	655	± 3.8%	49%	37%	14%

==== Predictions ====
Source	Ranking	As of
The Cook Political Report	Lean R	November 5, 2018
Inside Elections	Likely R	November 5, 2018
Sabato's Crystal Ball	Likely R	November 5, 2018
RCP	Lean R	November 5, 2018
Daily Kos	Likely R	November 5, 2018
538	Likely R	November 7, 2018
CNN	Likely R	October 31, 2018
Politico	Lean R	November 2, 2018

==== Results ====
Florida's 16th congressional district, 2018
Party	Candidate	Votes	%
Republican	Vern Buchanan (incumbent)	197,483	54.6
Democratic	David Shapiro	164,463	45.4
Total votes		361,946	100.0
Republican hold			

== District 17 ==
2018 Florida's 17th congressional district election
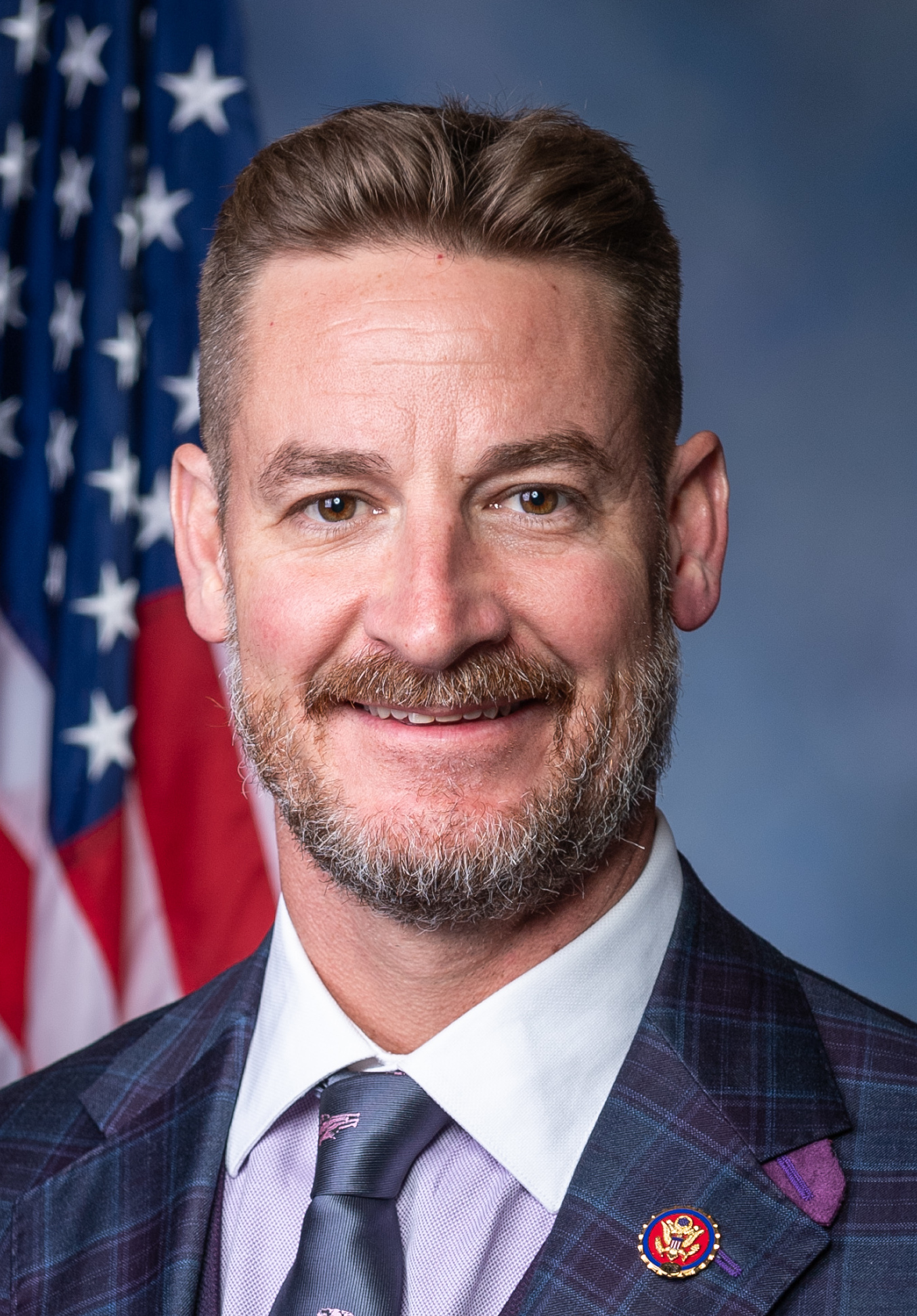

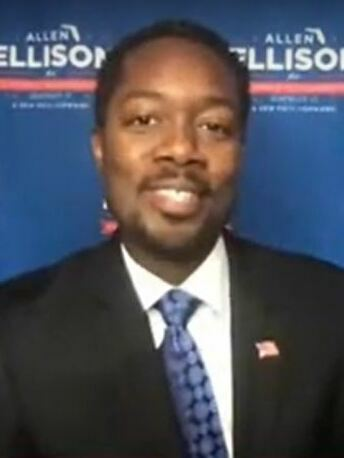
	Majority party	Minority party
Candidate	Greg Steube	Allen Ellison
Party	Republican	Democratic
Popular vote	193,326	117,194
Percentage	62.3%	37.7%
- County results Steube: 50–60% 60–70%
U.S. Representative before election
Tom Rooney
Republican
Elected U.S. Representative
Greg Steube
Republican

The 17th district comprises most of the Florida Heartland, including the cities of Sebring and Okeechobee, as well as parts of the Suncoast, such as North Port and Port Charlotte. Incumbent Republican Tom Rooney, who had represented the district since 2013 and previously represented the 16th district from 2009 to 2013, retired. He was re-elected to a fifth term with 62% of the vote in 2016. The district had a PVI of R+13.

=== Republican primary ===
Rooney announced on February 19, 2018, that he will retire from Congress and not seek re-election in 2018.

==== Candidates ====
===== Nominee =====
- Greg Steube, state senator for the 23rd district

===== Eliminated in primary =====
- Bill Akins, veteran
- Julio Gonzalez, state representative

==== Endorsements ====
Greg Steube

Organizations

- Club for Growth

==== Polling ====
Poll source	Date(s) administered	Sample size	Margin of error	Bill Akins	Julio Gonzalez	Greg Steube	Undecided
WPA Intelligence (R-CFG)	August 8–9, 2018	300	± 5.7%	5%	16%	39%	40%

==== Primary results ====
Republican primary results
Party	Candidate	Votes	%
Republican	Greg Steube	48,963	62.4
Republican	Bill Akins	15,133	19.3
Republican	Julio Gonzalez	14,402	18.3
Total votes		78,498	100.0

=== Democratic primary ===
==== Candidates ====
===== Nominee =====
- April Freeman, businesswoman, nominee for the 19th district in 2014 and for this seat in 2016

===== Eliminated in primary =====
- Bill Pollard, respiratory therapist

==== Primary results ====
Democratic primary results
Party	Candidate	Votes	%
Democratic	April Freeman	33,376	77.0
Democratic	Bill Pollard	9,976	23.0
Total votes		43,352	100.0

=== General election ===
==== Predictions ====
Source	Ranking	As of
The Cook Political Report	Safe R	November 5, 2018
Inside Elections	Safe R	November 5, 2018
Sabato's Crystal Ball	Safe R	November 5, 2018
RCP	Safe R	November 5, 2018
Daily Kos	Safe R	November 5, 2018
538	Safe R	November 7, 2018
CNN	Safe R	October 31, 2018
Politico	Safe R	November 4, 2018

==== Campaign ====
The Democratic nominee April Freeman died on September 24, 2018, six weeks before the election. Allen Ellison was chosen to be the Democratic nominee.

==== Endorsements ====
Greg Steube (R)

Organizations

- House Freedom Caucus
- With Honor Fund

==== Results ====
Florida's 17th congressional district, 2018
Party	Candidate	Votes	%
Republican	Greg Steube	193,326	62.3
Democratic	Allen Ellison	117,194	37.7
Total votes		310,520	100.0
Republican hold			

== District 18 ==
2018 Florida's 18th congressional district election
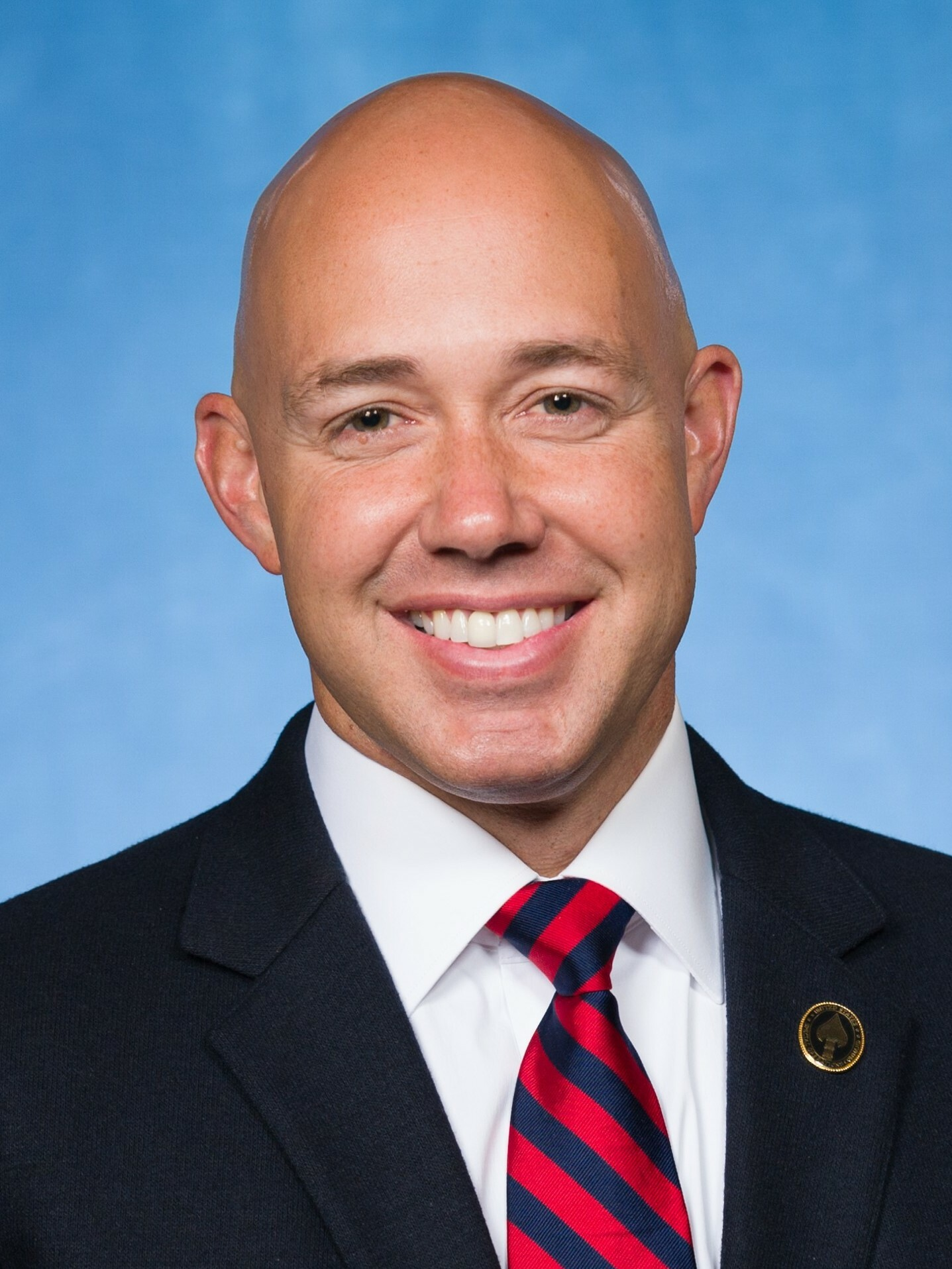

	Majority party	Minority party
Candidate	Brian Mast	Lauren Baer
Party	Republican	Democratic
Popular vote	185,905	156,454
Percentage	54.3%	45.7%
- County results Mast: 50–60% 60–70% Baer: 50–60%
U.S. Representative before election
Brian Mast
Republican
Elected U.S. Representative
Brian Mast
Republican

The 18th district is located in the Treasure Coast region and includes Stuart, Port St. Lucie, and the northern Palm Beach suburbs such as Jupiter and Palm Beach Gardens. Incumbent Republican Brian Mast, who had represented the district since 2017, was elected with 54% of the vote in 2016. The district had a PVI of R+5.

=== Republican primary ===
==== Candidates ====
===== Nominee =====
- Brian Mast, incumbent U.S. Representative

===== Eliminated in primary =====
- Dave Cummings, educator
- Mark Freeman, businessman

==== Debate ====
2018 Florida's 18th congressional district republican primary debate
No.	Date	Host	Moderator	Link	Republican	Republican	Republican
Key: P Participant A Absent N Not invited I Invited W Withdrawn							
Key: P Participant A Absent N Not invited I Invited W Withdrawn					Dave Cummings	Mark Freeman	Brian Mast
1	Aug. 3, 2018	WPTV-TV	Michael Williams	YouTube (Part 1); YouTube (Part 2)	P	P	P

==== Primary results ====
Republican primary results
Party	Candidate	Votes	%
Republican	Brian Mast (incumbent)	55,427	77.7
Republican	Mark Freeman	8,081	11.3
Republican	Dave Cummings	7,871	11.0
Total votes		71,379	100.0

=== Democratic primary ===
Florida's 18th district was included on the initial list of Republican held seats being targeted by the Democratic Congressional Campaign Committee in 2018.

==== Candidates ====
===== Nominee =====
- Lauren Baer, attorney and former U.S. State Department official

===== Eliminated in primary =====
- Pam Keith, attorney and candidate for U.S. Senate in 2016

===== Declined =====
- Dave Aronberg, Palm Beach County State Attorney and former state senator (endorsed Baer)
- Jonathan Chane, attorney and candidate for this seat in 2016 (endorsed Baer)
- Corinna Robinson, retired Army major and nominee for South Dakota's at-large congressional district in 2014

==== Endorsements ====
Lauren Baer

U.S. representatives

- Ted Deutch, U.S. representative from Florida's 22nd congressional district (Note: Numbered as the 19th from 2010 to 2013 and the 21st from 2013 to 2017)
- Patrick Murphy, former U.S. representative from this district (2013–2017)

State legislators

- Kevin Rader, state senator
- Matt Willhite, state representative

Local officials

- Jeri Muoio, mayor of West Palm Beach

Individuals

- Rosie O'Donnell, actress

Organizations

- LGBTQ Victory Fund
- NARAL Pro-Choice America

Labor unions

- AFL-CIO Florida chapter
- American Federation of Government Employees
- American Federation of State, County and Municipal Employees
- American Postal Workers Union
- Amalgamated Transit Union
- International Alliance of Theatrical Stage Employees
- International Brotherhood of Electrical Workers
- Service Employees International Union
Pam Keith

Organizations

- Florida NOW
- Justice Democrats
- VoteVets

==== Debate ====
2018 Florida's 18th congressional district democratic primary debate
No.	Date	Host	Moderator	Link	Democratic	Democratic
Key: P Participant A Absent N Not invited I Invited W Withdrawn						
Key: P Participant A Absent N Not invited I Invited W Withdrawn					Lauren Baer	Pam Keith
1	Aug. 3, 2018	WPTV-TV	Michael Williams	YouTube (Part 1); YouTube (Part 2)	P	P

==== Primary results ====
Democratic primary results
Party	Candidate	Votes	%
Democratic	Lauren Baer	34,922	60.3
Democratic	Pam Keith	23,007	39.7
Total votes		57,929	100.0

=== General election ===
==== Endorsements ====
Brian Mast (R)

Organizations

- National Republican Congressional Committee "Patriot" Program
- With Honor Fund
Lauren Baer (D)

Federal executive branch officials

- Joe Biden, former Vice President of the United States
- John Kerry, former Secretary of State of the United States

Labor unions

- International Brotherhood of Boilermakers

Organizations

- Democratic Congressional Campaign Committee "Red to Blue" Program
- EMILY's List
- End Citizens United
- MoveOn

==== Debate ====
2018 Florida's 18th congressional district debate
No.	Date	Host	Moderator	Link	Republican	Democratic
Key: P Participant A Absent N Not invited I Invited W Withdrawn						
Key: P Participant A Absent N Not invited I Invited W Withdrawn					Brian Mast	Lauren Baer
1	October 15, 2018	WPTV-TV	Michael Williams		P	P

==== Polling ====
Poll source	Date(s) administered	Sample size	Margin of error	Brian Mast (R)	Lauren Baer (D)	Undecided
Change Research (D)	October 27–29, 2018	475	–	53%	44%	–
Global Strategy Group (D)	September 26–30, 2018	600	± 4.9%	48%	45%	–
Public Policy Polling (D)	September 17–19, 2018	533	–	46%	43%	10%

Hypothetical polling

Poll source	Date(s) administered	Sample size	Margin of error	Brian Mast (R)	Democratic challenger (D)	Other	Undecided
IMGE Insights (R)	July 9–12, 2018	400	–	50%	40%	–	10%

==== Predictions ====
Source	Ranking	As of
The Cook Political Report	Lean R	November 5, 2018
Inside Elections	Likely R	November 5, 2018
Sabato's Crystal Ball	Lean R	November 5, 2018
RCP	Lean R	November 5, 2018
Daily Kos	Lean R	November 5, 2018
538	Likely R	November 7, 2018
CNN	Lean R	October 31, 2018
Politico	Lean R	November 2, 2018

==== Results ====
Florida's 18th congressional district, 2018
Party	Candidate	Votes	%
Republican	Brian Mast (incumbent)	185,905	54.3
Democratic	Lauren Baer	156,454	45.7
Total votes		342,359	100.0
Republican hold			

== District 19 ==
2018 Florida's 19th congressional district election
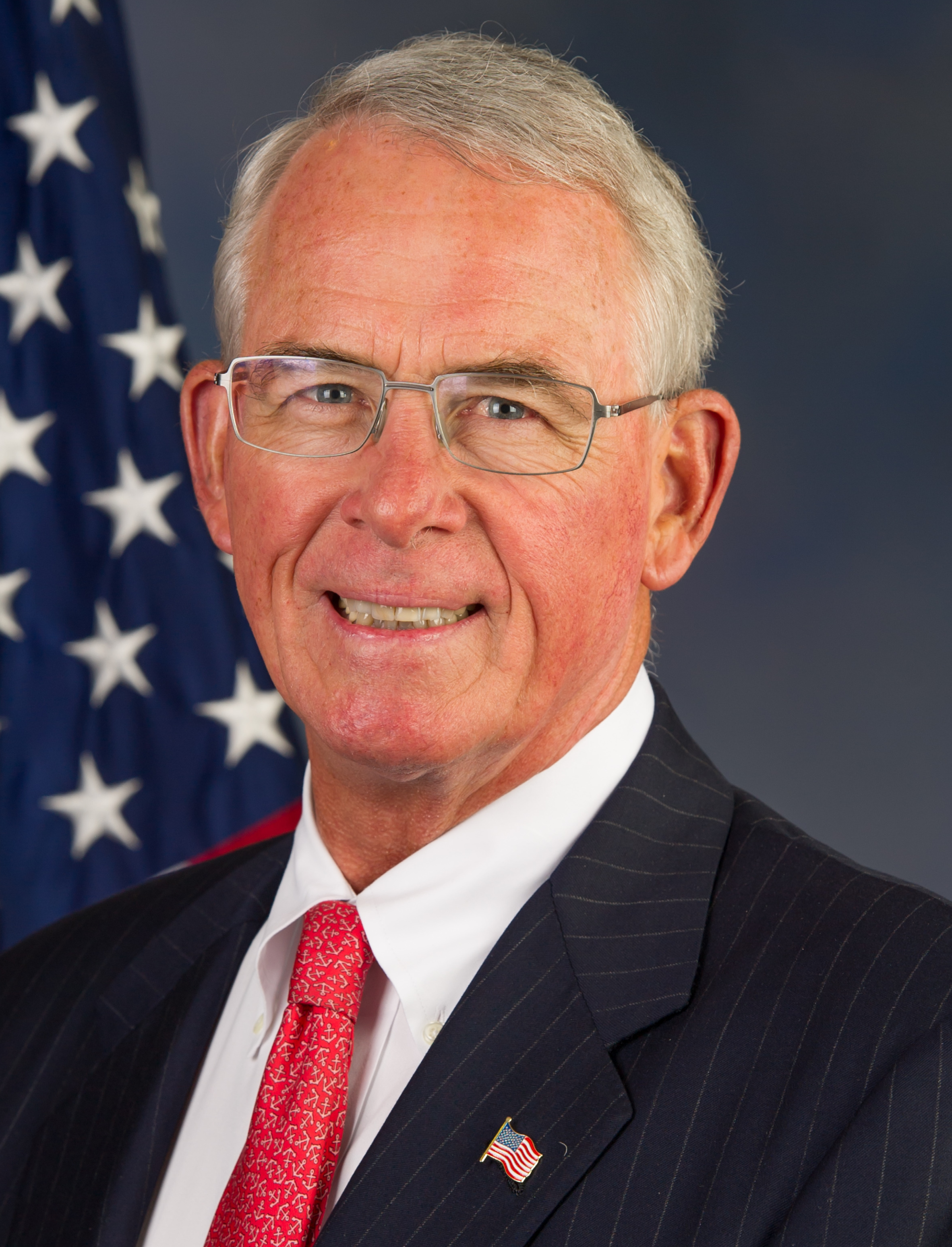

	Majority party	Minority party
Candidate	Francis Rooney	David Holden
Party	Republican	Democratic
Popular vote	211,465	128,106
Percentage	62.3%	37.7%
- County results Rooney: 60–70%
U.S. Representative before election
Francis Rooney
Republican
Elected U.S. Representative
Francis Rooney
Republican

The 19th district is located in Southwestern Florida and includes Bonita Springs, Cape Coral, and Naples. Incumbent Republican Francis Rooney, who had represented the district since 2017, ran for re-election. He was elected with 66% of the vote in 2016. The district had a PVI of R+13.

=== Republican primary ===
==== Candidates ====
===== Nominee =====
- Francis Rooney, incumbent U.S. Representative

=== Democratic primary ===
==== Candidates ====
===== Nominee =====
- David Holden, financial adviser

===== Eliminated in primary =====
- Todd James Truax, healthcare administrator

==== Primary results ====
Democratic primary results
Party	Candidate	Votes	%
Democratic	David Holden	24,390	67.9
Democratic	Todd James Truax	11,513	32.1
Total votes		35,903	100.0

=== General election ===
==== Predictions ====
Source	Ranking	As of
The Cook Political Report	Safe R	November 5, 2018
Inside Elections	Safe R	November 5, 2018
Sabato's Crystal Ball	Safe R	November 5, 2018
RCP	Safe R	November 5, 2018
Daily Kos	Safe R	November 5, 2018
538	Safe R	November 7, 2018
CNN	Safe R	October 31, 2018
Politico	Safe R	November 4, 2018

==== Endorsements ====
David Holden (D)

Labor unions

- International Brotherhood of Boilermakers

Organizations

- Indivisible

==== Polling ====
Poll source	Date(s) administered	Sample size	Margin of error	Francis Rooney (R)	David Holden (D)	Undecided
Change Research (D-Holden)	September 10–12, 2018	468	± 4.0%	51%	42%	7%

==== Results ====
Florida's 19th congressional district, 2018
Party	Candidate	Votes	%
Republican	Francis Rooney (incumbent)	211,465	62.3
Democratic	David Holden	128,106	37.7
Independent	Pete Pollard (write-in)	36	0.0
Total votes		339,607	100.0
Republican hold			

== District 20 ==
2018 Florida's 20th congressional district election
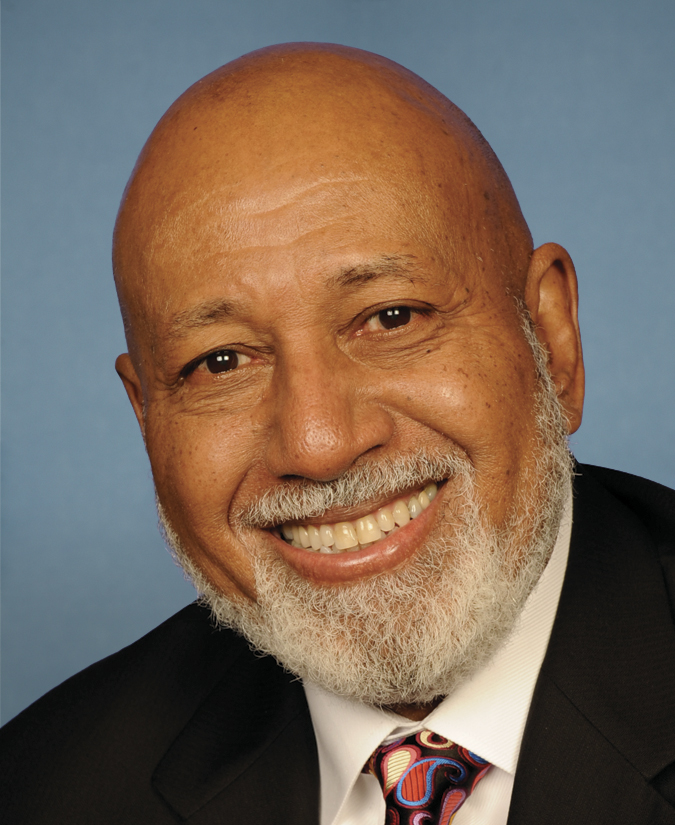
	Majority party
Candidate	Alcee Hastings
Party	Democratic
Popular vote	202,659
Percentage	99.9%
- County results Hastings: 90–100%
U.S. Representative before election
Alcee Hastings
Democratic
Elected U.S. Representative
Alcee Hastings
Democratic

The 20th district stretches from inland South Florida with many protected areas of the Everglades and Belle Glade to the Miami metro area and includes parts of West Palm Beach & Fort Lauderdale, and Miramar. Incumbent Democrat Alcee Hastings, who had represented the district since 2013 and previously represented the 23rd district from 1993 to 2013, ran for re-election. He was re-elected to a thirteenth term with 80% of the vote in 2016. The district had a PVI of D+31.

=== Democratic primary ===
==== Candidates ====
===== Nominee =====
- Alcee Hastings, incumbent U.S. Representative

===== Eliminated in primary =====
- Sheila Cherfilus-McCormick, healthcare executive

==== Primary results ====
Democratic primary results
Party	Candidate	Votes	%
Democratic	Alcee Hastings (incumbent)	50,315	73.6
Democratic	Sheila Cherfilus-McCormick	18,031	26.4
Total votes		68,346	100.0

=== General election ===
==== Predictions ====
Source	Ranking	As of
The Cook Political Report	Safe D	November 5, 2018
Inside Elections	Safe D	November 5, 2018
Sabato's Crystal Ball	Safe D	November 5, 2018
RCP	Safe D	November 5, 2018
Daily Kos	Safe D	November 5, 2018
538	Safe D	November 7, 2018
CNN	Safe D	October 31, 2018
Politico	Safe D	November 4, 2018

==== Endorsements ====
Alcee Hastings (D)

Labor unions

- International Brotherhood of Boilermakers

==== Results ====
Florida's 20th congressional district, 2018
Party	Candidate	Votes	%
Democratic	Alcee Hastings (incumbent)	202,659	99.9
Independent	Jay Bonner (write-in)	165	0.1
Total votes		202,824	100.0
Democratic hold			

== District 21 ==
2018 Florida's 21st congressional district election
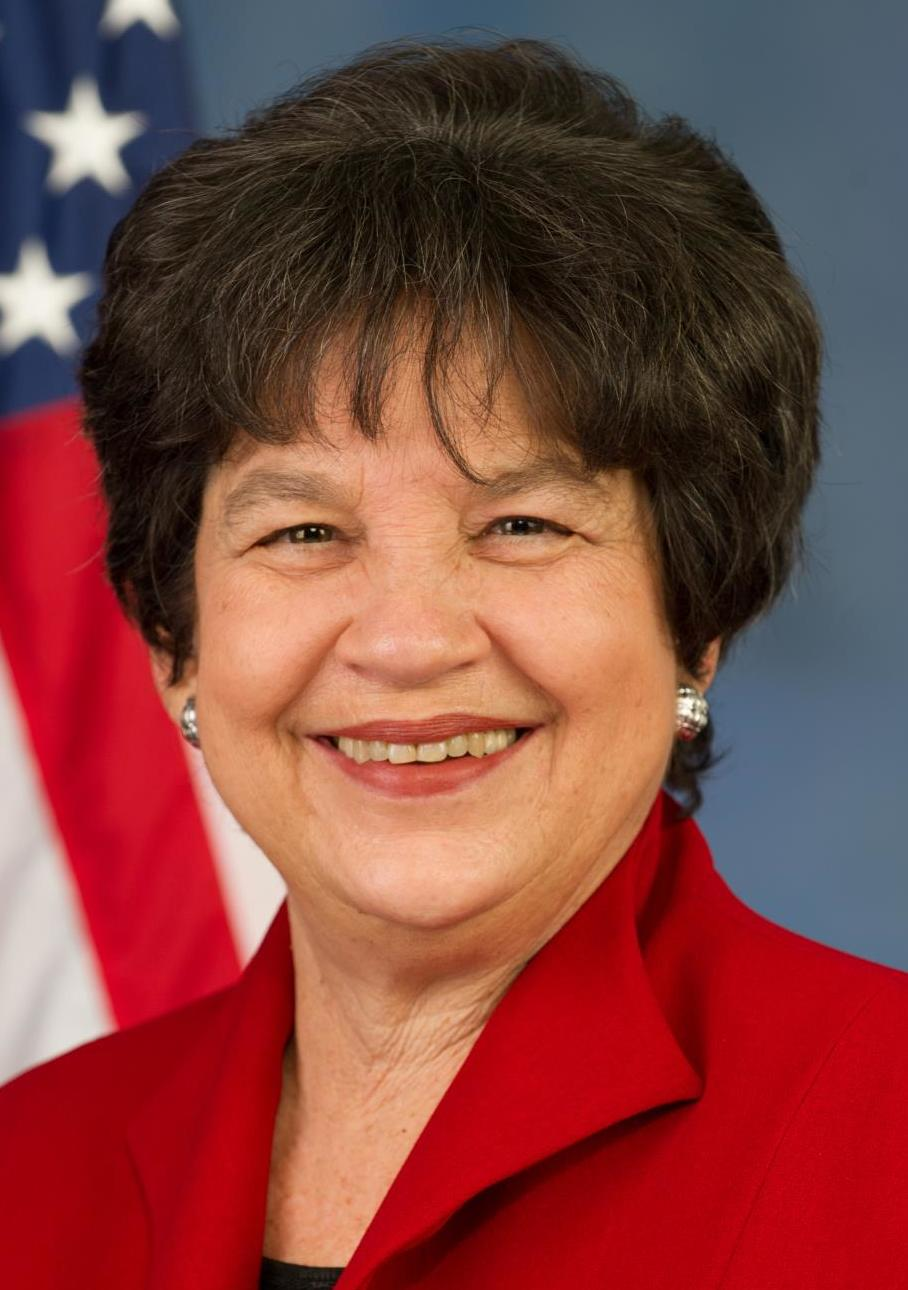
	Majority party
Candidate	Lois Frankel
Party	Democratic
Popular vote	Unopposed
Percentage	N/a
U.S. Representative before election
Lois Frankel
Democratic
Elected U.S. Representative
Lois Frankel
Democratic

The 21st district is located in the Miami metro area and includes the West Palm Beach suburbs, such as Greenacres and Wellington, as well as Boynton Beach and Delray Beach. Incumbent Democrat Lois Frankel, who had represented the district since 2017 and previously represented the 22nd district from 2013 to 2017, ran for re-election. She was re-elected to a third term with 63% of the vote in 2016. The district had a PVI of D+9.

=== Democratic primary ===
==== Candidates ====
===== Nominee =====
- Lois Frankel, incumbent U.S. Representative

=== General election ===
Incumbent Lois Frankel ran unopposed in the general election. As such, no election for the position was held, and Frankel was declared the winner automatically by the Board of Elections for the State of Florida.

==== Predictions ====
Source	Ranking	As of
The Cook Political Report	Safe D	November 5, 2018
Inside Elections	Safe D	November 5, 2018
Sabato's Crystal Ball	Safe D	November 5, 2018
RCP	Safe D	November 5, 2018
Daily Kos	Safe D	November 5, 2018
538	Safe D	November 7, 2018
CNN	Safe D	October 31, 2018
Politico	Safe D	November 4, 2018

==== Endorsements ====
Lois Frankel (D)

Labor unions

- International Brotherhood of Boilermakers

Organizations

- Congressional Progressive Caucus
- End Citizens United

==== Results ====
Florida's 21st congressional district, 2018
Party	Candidate	Votes	%
Democratic	Lois Frankel (incumbent)	Unopposed	N/a
Total votes			N/a
Democratic hold			

== District 22 ==
2018 Florida's 22nd congressional district election
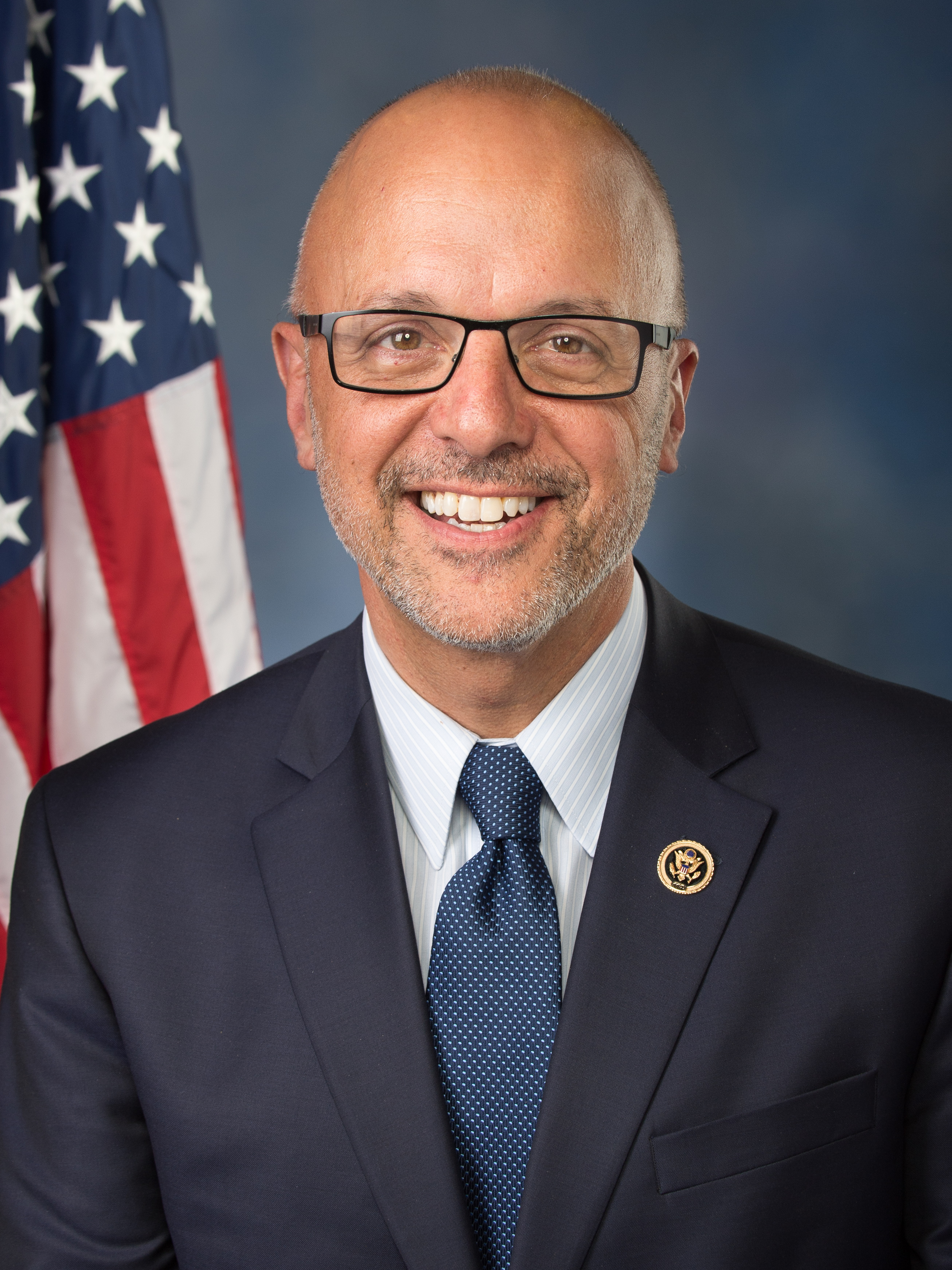

	Majority party	Minority party
Candidate	Ted Deutch	Nicolas Kimaz
Party	Democratic	Republican
Popular vote	184,634	113,049
Percentage	62.0%	38.0%
- County results Deutch: 50–60% 60–70%
U.S. Representative before election
Ted Deutch
Democratic
Elected U.S. Representative
Ted Deutch
Democratic

The 22nd district is located in the Miami metro area and includes Boca Raton and Parkland, the site of the Stoneman Douglas High School shooting. Also, this district includes significant portions of Fort Lauderdale and Pompano Beach. Incumbent Democrat Ted Deutch, who had represented the district since 2017 and previously represented the 19th district from 2010 to 2013 and the 21st district from 2013 to 2017, ran for re-election. He was re-elected to a fourth term with 59% of the vote in 2016. The district had a PVI of D+6.

=== Democratic primary ===
==== Candidates ====
===== Nominee =====
- Ted Deutch, incumbent U.S. Representative

===== Eliminated in primary =====
- Jeff Fandl, businessman

==== Primary results ====
Democratic primary results
Party	Candidate	Votes	%
Democratic	Ted Deutch (incumbent)	52,628	86.5
Democratic	Jeff Fandl	8,207	13.5
Total votes		60,835	100.0

=== Republican primary ===
==== Candidates ====
===== Nominee =====
- Nicolas Kimaz, businessman

===== Eliminated in primary =====
- Javier Manjarres, blogger
- Eddison Walters, real estate investor

==== Primary results ====
Republican primary results
Party	Candidate	Votes	%
Republican	Nicolas Kimaz	13,939	41.0
Republican	Javier Manjarres	11,552	33.9
Republican	Eddison Walters	8,545	25.1
Total votes		34,036	100.0

=== General election ===
==== Predictions ====
Source	Ranking	As of
The Cook Political Report	Safe D	November 5, 2018
Inside Elections	Safe D	November 5, 2018
Sabato's Crystal Ball	Safe D	November 5, 2018
RCP	Safe D	November 5, 2018
Daily Kos	Safe D	November 5, 2018
538	Safe D	November 7, 2018
CNN	Safe D	October 31, 2018
Politico	Safe D	November 4, 2018

==== Endorsements ====
Ted Deutch (D)

Labor unions

- International Brotherhood of Boilermakers

Organizations

- End Citizens United

==== Results ====
Florida's 22nd congressional district, 2018
Party	Candidate	Votes	%
Democratic	Ted Deutch (incumbent)	184,634	62.0
Republican	Nicolas Kimaz	113,049	38.0
Total votes		297,683	100.0
Democratic hold			

== District 23 ==
2018 Florida's 23rd congressional district election
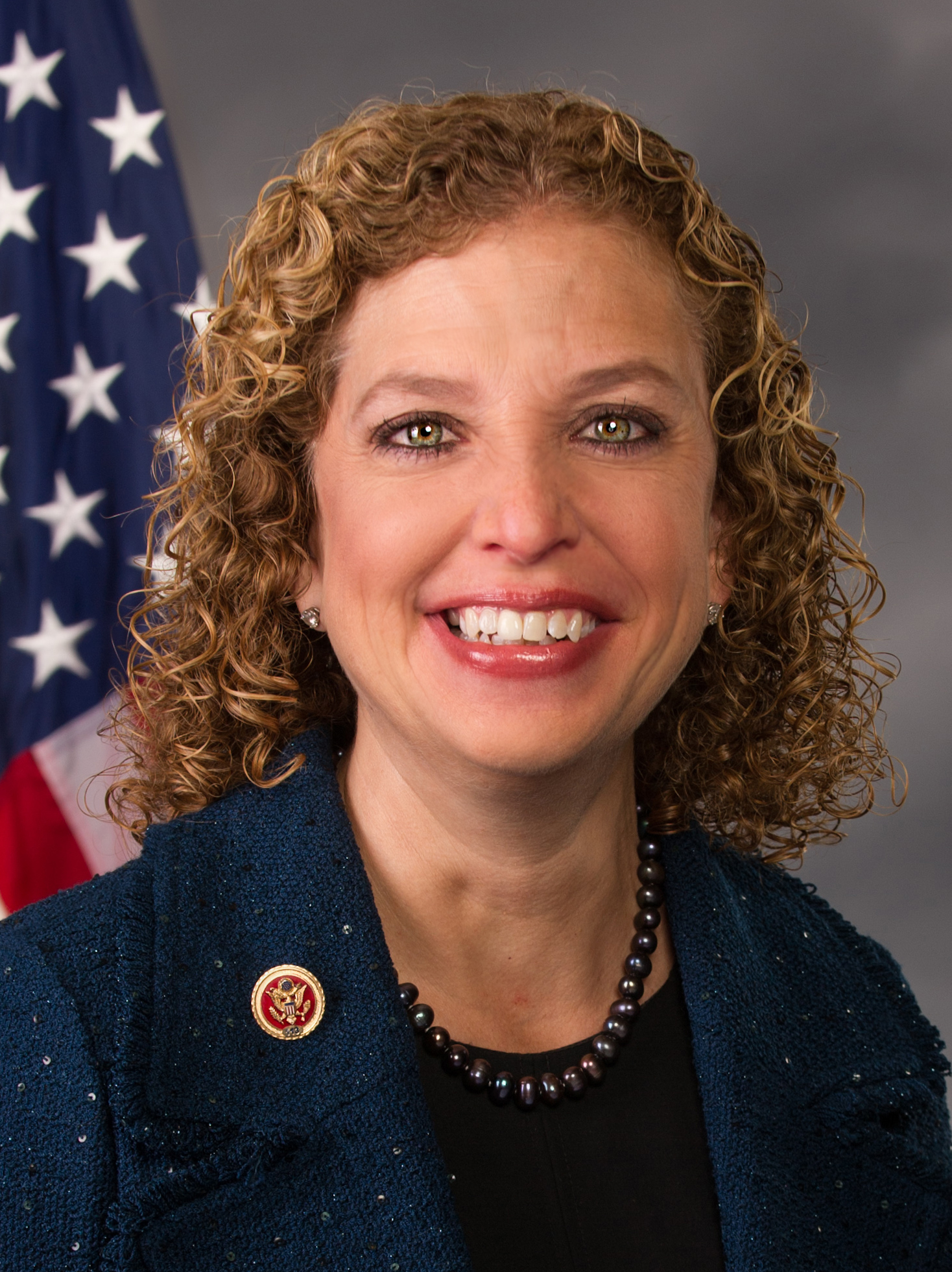

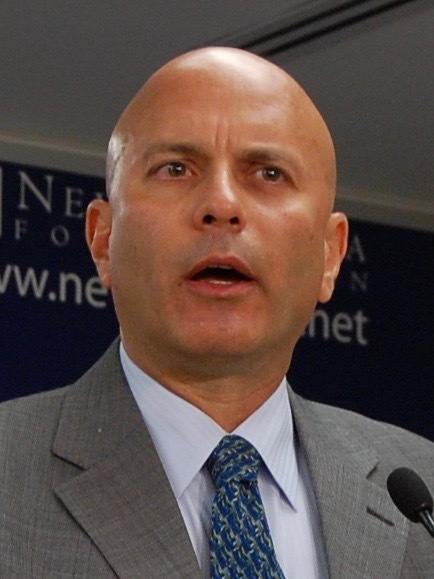
Nominee	Debbie Wasserman Schultz	Joe Kaufman	Tim Canova
Party	Democratic	Republican	Independent
Popular vote	161,611	99,446	13,697
Percentage	58.5%	30.6%	5.0%
- County results Schultz: 50–60%
U.S. Representative before election
Debbie Wasserman Schultz
Democratic
Elected U.S. Representative
Debbie Wasserman Schultz
Democratic

The 23rd district is located in the Miami metro area, including Plantation, Sunrise, and Weston. Incumbent Democrat Debbie Wasserman Schultz, who had represented the district since 2013 and previously represented the 20th district from 2005 to 2013, ran for re-election. She was re-elected to a seventh term with 57% of the vote in 2016. The district had a PVI of D+11.

=== Democratic primary ===
==== Candidates ====
===== Nominee =====
- Debbie Wasserman Schultz, incumbent U.S. Representative

=== Republican primary ===
==== Candidates ====
===== Nominee =====
- Joe Kaufman, counter-terrorism researcher, founder of Americans Against Hate, candidate for this seat 2012 and nominee in 2014 & 2016

===== Eliminated in primary =====
- Carlos Reyes, lawyer
- Carla Spalding, navy veteran, nurse and Independent candidate for the 18th district in 2016

==== Endorsements ====
Carlos Reyes

Newspapers

- Miami Herald

==== Primary results ====
Republican primary results
Party	Candidate	Votes	%
Republican	Joe Kaufman	11,304	44.7
Republican	Carlos Reyes	8,508	33.7
Republican	Carla Spalding	5,453	21.6
Total votes		25,265	100.0

=== Independents ===
Tim Canova, who lost in the 2016 primary to Wasserman Schultz by a 57% to 43% margin, ran as an independent in the 2018 general election. Don Endriss also ran as an independent candidate.

=== General election ===
==== Predictions ====
Source	Ranking	As of
The Cook Political Report	Safe D	November 5, 2018
Inside Elections	Safe D	November 5, 2018
Sabato's Crystal Ball	Safe D	November 5, 2018
RCP	Safe D	November 5, 2018
Daily Kos	Safe D	November 5, 2018
538	Safe D	November 7, 2018
CNN	Safe D	October 31, 2018
Politico	Safe D	November 4, 2018

==== Endorsements ====
Debbie Wasserman Schultz (D)

Labor unions

- International Brotherhood of Boilermakers

==== Results ====
Florida's 23rd congressional district, 2018
Party	Candidate	Votes	%
Democratic	Debbie Wasserman Schultz (incumbent)	161,611	58.5
Republican	Joe Kaufman	99,446	36.0
Independent	Tim Canova	13,697	5.0
Independent	Don Endriss	1,612	0.6
Total votes		276,366	100.0
Democratic hold			

== District 24 ==
2018 Florida's 24th congressional district election
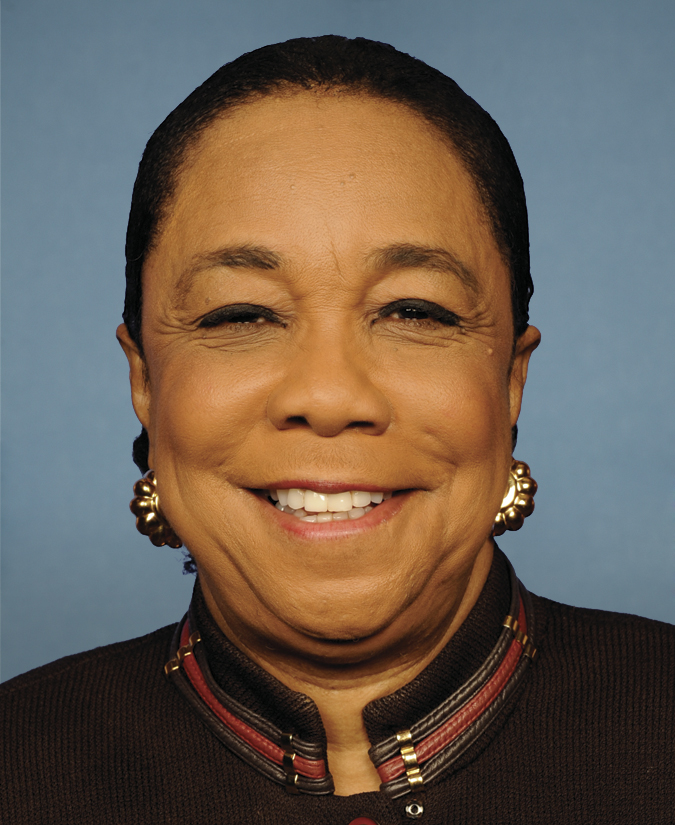
	Majority party
Candidate	Frederica Wilson
Party	Democratic
Popular vote	Unopposed
Percentage	N/a
U.S. Representative before election
Frederica Wilson
Democratic
Elected U.S. Representative
Frederica Wilson
Democratic

The 24th district includes parts of Miami and its northern suburbs such as North Miami Beach and Miami Gardens. Democrat Frederica Wilson, who had represented the district since 2013 and previously represented the 17th district from 2011 to 2013, was re-elected to a fourth term unopposed in 2016. The district had a PVI of D+34.

=== Democratic primary ===
Because no write-in candidates or candidates of other parties filed to run in this district, the Democratic primary was open to all voters.

==== Candidates ====
===== Nominee =====
- Frederica Wilson, incumbent U.S. Representative

===== Eliminated in primary =====
- Ricardo de la Fuente, entrepreneur

==== Primary results ====
Democratic primary results
Party	Candidate	Votes	%
Democratic	Frederica Wilson (incumbent)	65,894	83.7
Democratic	Ricardo de la Fuente	12,833	16.3
Total votes		78,727	100.0

=== Republican primary ===
==== Candidates ====
===== Withdrawn =====
- Louis E. Sola, U.S. Army veteran

=== General election ===
Both candidates were removed from the ballot which was cited for the recount in the Florida gubernatorial and United States Senate elections.

==== Predictions ====
Source	Ranking	As of
The Cook Political Report	Safe D	November 5, 2018
Inside Elections	Safe D	November 5, 2018
Sabato's Crystal Ball	Safe D	November 5, 2018
RCP	Safe D	November 5, 2018
Daily Kos	Safe D	November 5, 2018
538	Safe D	November 7, 2018
CNN	Safe D	October 31, 2018
Politico	Safe D	November 4, 2018

==== Results ====
Incumbent Frederica Wilson won unopposed in the general election

==== Endorsements ====
Frederica Wilson (D)

Labor unions

- Communications Workers of America
- International Brotherhood of Boilermakers

Florida's 24th congressional district, 2018
Party	Candidate	Votes	%
Democratic	Frederica Wilson (incumbent)	Unopposed	N/a
Total votes			N/a
Democratic hold			

== District 25 ==
2018 Florida's 25th congressional district election
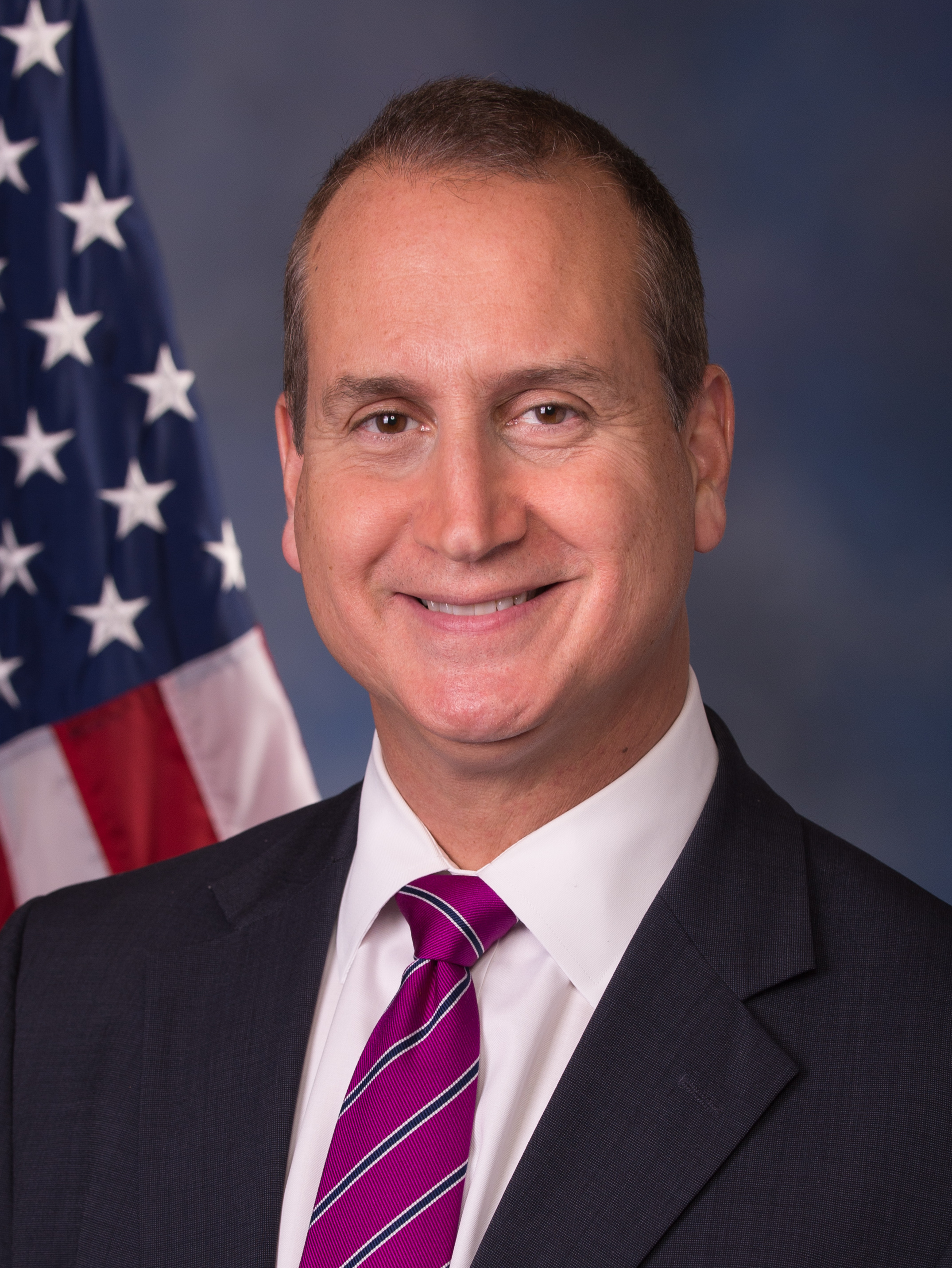

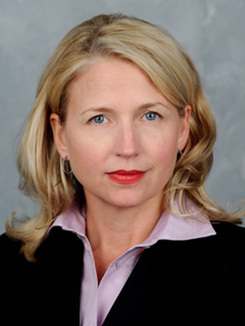
	Majority party	Minority party
Candidate	Mario Diaz-Balart	Mary Barzee Flores
Party	Republican	Democratic
Popular vote	128,672	84,173
Percentage	60.5%	39.5%
- County results Diaz-Balart: 50–60% 60–70%
U.S. Representative before election
Mario Diaz-Balart
Republican
Elected U.S. Representative
Mario Diaz-Balart
Republican

The 25th district includes the western Miami suburbs, such as Hialeah and Miami Lakes, and goes across the northern border of the Everglades to eastern Naples suburbs of Golden Gate and Immokalee. The district also extends upward into the Florida Heartland including Clewiston and LaBelle. Incumbent Republican Mario Díaz-Balart, who had represented the district since 2013 and previously represented the 21st district from 2011 to 2013 as well as a different version of the 25th from 2003 to 2011, ran for re-election. He was re-elected to an eighth term with 62% of the vote in 2016. The district had a PVI of R+4.

=== Republican primary ===
==== Candidates ====
===== Nominee =====
- Mario Díaz-Balart, incumbent U.S. Representative

=== Democratic primary ===
Florida's 25th district has been included on the initial list of Republican-held seats being targeted by the Democratic Congressional Campaign Committee in 2018.

==== Candidates ====
===== Nominee =====
- Mary Barzee Flores, attorney and former Eleventh Judicial Circuit Court of Florida Judge

===== Withdrawn =====
- Annisa Karim, Lee County Department of Parks & Recreation manager (endorsed Flores)
- Alina Valdes, doctor and nominee for this seat in 2016 (endorsed Flores)

==== Endorsements ====
Mary Barzee Flores

Organizations

- EMILY's List
- League of Conservation Voters
- Progressive Democrats of America

=== General election ===
==== Endorsements ====
Mario Díaz-Balart (R)

Labor unions

- International Brotherhood of Boilermakers
Mary Barzee Flores (D)

Organizations

- Democratic Congressional Campaign Committee "Red to Blue" Program
- EMILY's List
- End Citizens United
- MoveOn

==== Polling ====
Poll source	Date(s) administered	Sample size	Margin of error	Mario Díaz-Balart (R)	Mary Barzee-Flores (D)	Undecided
Public Policy Polling (D)	September 17–19, 2018	541	–	41%	36%	22%
Public Policy Polling (D)	May 21–23, 2018	670	–	46%	39%	15%

==== Predictions ====
Source	Ranking	As of
The Cook Political Report	Lean R	November 5, 2018
Inside Elections	Safe R	November 5, 2018
Sabato's Crystal Ball	Likely R	November 5, 2018
RCP	Likely R	November 5, 2018
Daily Kos	Likely R	November 5, 2018
538	Lean R	November 7, 2018
CNN	Likely R	October 31, 2018
Politico	Likely R	November 2, 2018

==== Results ====
Florida's 25th congressional district, 2018
Party	Candidate	Votes	%
Republican	Mario Díaz-Balart (incumbent)	128,672	60.4
Democratic	Mary Barzee Flores	84,173	39.6
Total votes		212,845	100.0
Republican hold			

== District 26 ==
2018 Florida's 26th congressional district election
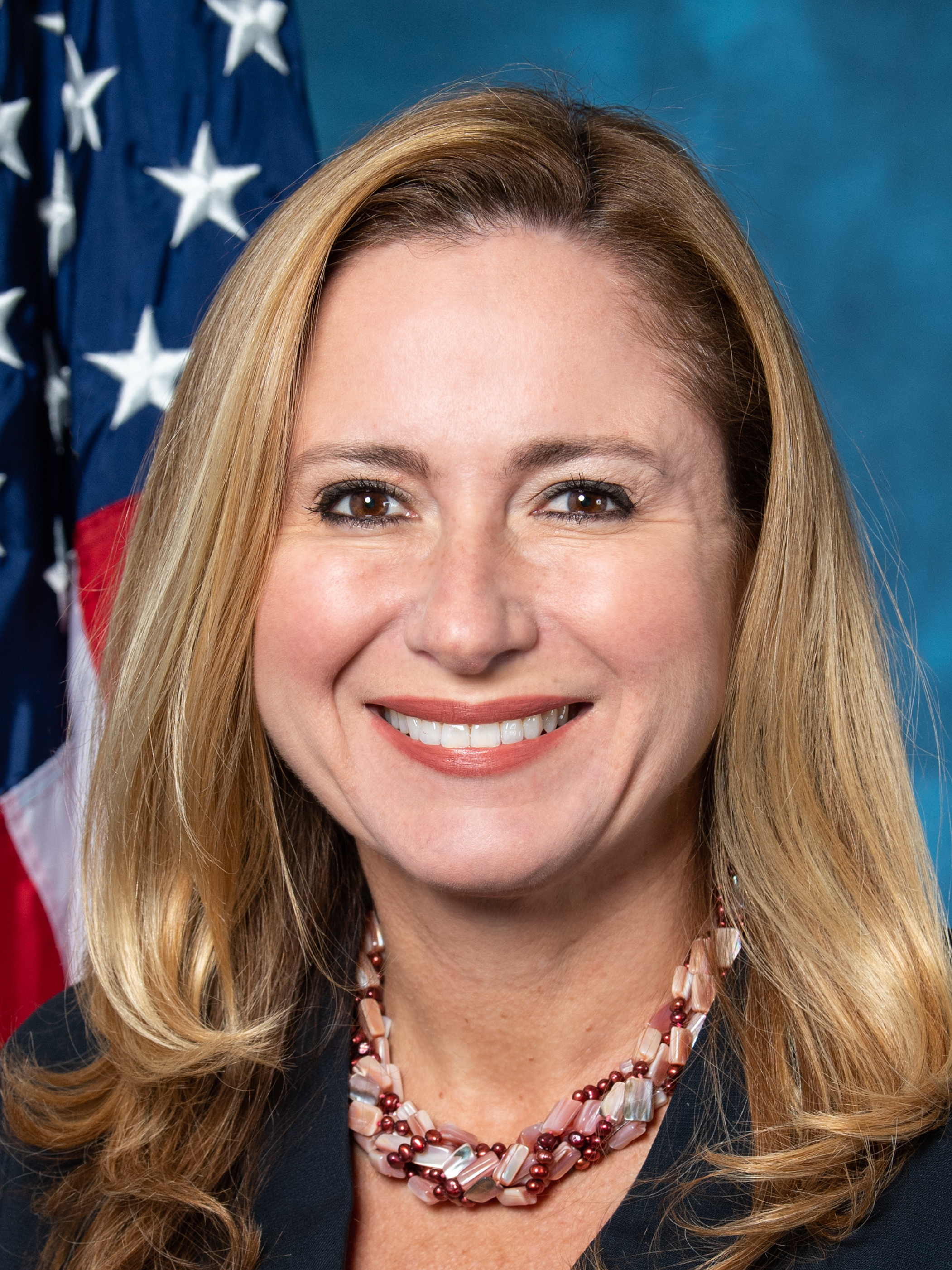

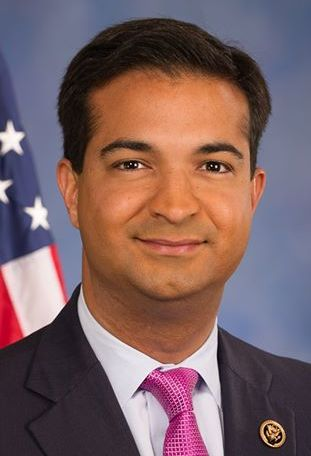
Nominee	Debbie Mucarsel-Powell	Carlos Curbelo
Party	Democratic	Republican
Popular vote	119,797	115,678
Percentage	50.9%	49.1%
- Mucarsel-Powell: 50–60% Curbelo: 50–60%
U.S. Representative before election
Carlos Curbelo
Republican
Elected U.S. Representative
Debbie Mucarsel-Powell
Democratic

The 26th district is centered on the Miami suburb of Homestead, includes most of the Everglades National Park, and extends downward into the Florida Keys, including Key West and Marathon. Incumbent Republican Carlos Curbelo, who had represented the district since 2015, ran for re-election. He was re-elected to a second term with 53% of the vote in 2016. The district had a PVI of D+6.

=== Republican primary ===
==== Candidates ====
===== Nominee =====
- Carlos Curbelo, incumbent U.S. Representative

===== Eliminated in primary =====
- Souraya Faas, television personality

==== Endorsements ====
Carlos Curbelo

Organizations

- Humane Society Legislative Fund

Newspapers

- Miami Herald

==== Primary results ====
Republican primary results
Party	Candidate	Votes	%
Republican	Carlos Curbelo (incumbent)	29,506	84.0
Republican	Souraya Faas	5,629	16.0
Total votes		35,135	100.0

=== Democratic primary ===
Florida's 26th district was included on the initial list of Republican-held seats being targeted by the Democratic Congressional Campaign Committee in 2018.

==== Candidates ====
===== Nominee =====
- Debbie Mucarsel-Powell, businesswoman and nominee for the 23rd Senate district in 2016

===== Eliminated in primary =====
- Demetries Grimes, U.S. Navy veteran

===== Declined =====
- Steve Smith, businessman

==== Primary results ====
Democratic primary results
Party	Candidate	Votes	%
Democratic	Debbie Mucarsel-Powell	20,997	63.5
Democratic	Demetries Grimes	12,095	36.5
Total votes		33,092	100.0

=== General election ===
==== Debate ====
2018 Florida's 26th congressional district debate
No.	Date	Host	Moderator	Link	Republican	Democratic
Key: P Participant A Absent N Not invited I Invited W Withdrawn						
Key: P Participant A Absent N Not invited I Invited W Withdrawn					Carlos Curbelo	Debbie Mucarsel-Powell
1	Oct. 21, 2018	WPLG-TV			P	P

==== Endorsements ====
Carlos Curbelo (R)

Organizations

- National Republican Congressional Committee "Patriot" Program
Debbie Mucarsel-Powell (D)

Labor unions

- International Brotherhood of Boilermakers

Organizations

- Congressional Progressive Caucus
- Democratic Congressional Campaign Committee "Red to Blue" Program
- EMILY's List
- End Citizens United
- MoveOn

==== Polling ====
Poll source	Date(s) administered	Sample size	Margin of error	Carlos Curbelo (R)	Debbie Mucarsel- Powell (D)	Undecided
NYT Upshot/Siena College	October 19–24, 2018	499	± 4.9%	44%	45%	11%
Mason-Dixon	October 3–9, 2018	625	± 4.0%	46%	45%	9%
GBA Strategies (D)	September 27 – October 1, 2018	500	± 4.4%	48%	50%	–
GQR Research (D-Mucarsel-Powell)	September 23–27, 2018	511	± 4.9%	48%	49%	–
Public Policy Polling (D)	September 17–19, 2018	511	–	44%	45%	11%
NYT Upshot/Siena College	September 13–17, 2018	509	± 5.0%	47%	44%	9%
GBA Strategies (D)	July 16–22, 2018	500	± 4.4%	48%	41%	–
DCCC (D)	March 17–22, 2018	418	± 4.9%	45%	40%	–

Hypothetical polling

Poll source	Date(s) administered	Sample size	Margin of error	Carlos Curbelo (R)	Democratic opponent (D)	Undecided
Public Policy Polling (D)	November 8–9, 2017	522	± 4.3%	39%	53%	8%

==== Predictions ====
Source	Ranking	As of
The Cook Political Report	Tossup	November 5, 2018
Inside Elections	Tossup	November 5, 2018
Sabato's Crystal Ball	Lean R	November 5, 2018
RCP	Tossup	November 5, 2018
Daily Kos	Tossup	November 5, 2018
538	Tossup	November 7, 2018
CNN	Tossup	October 31, 2018
Politico	Tossup	November 2, 2018

==== Results ====
Mucarsel-Powell defeated Curbelo, becoming the first Ecuadorian American and first South American-born immigrant to serve as a member of the U.S. Congress.

Florida's 26th congressional district, 2018
Party	Candidate	Votes	%
Democratic	Debbie Mucarsel-Powell	119,797	50.9
Republican	Carlos Curbelo (incumbent)	115,678	49.1
Total votes		235,475	100.0
Democratic gain from Republican			

== District 27 ==
2018 Florida's 27th congressional district election
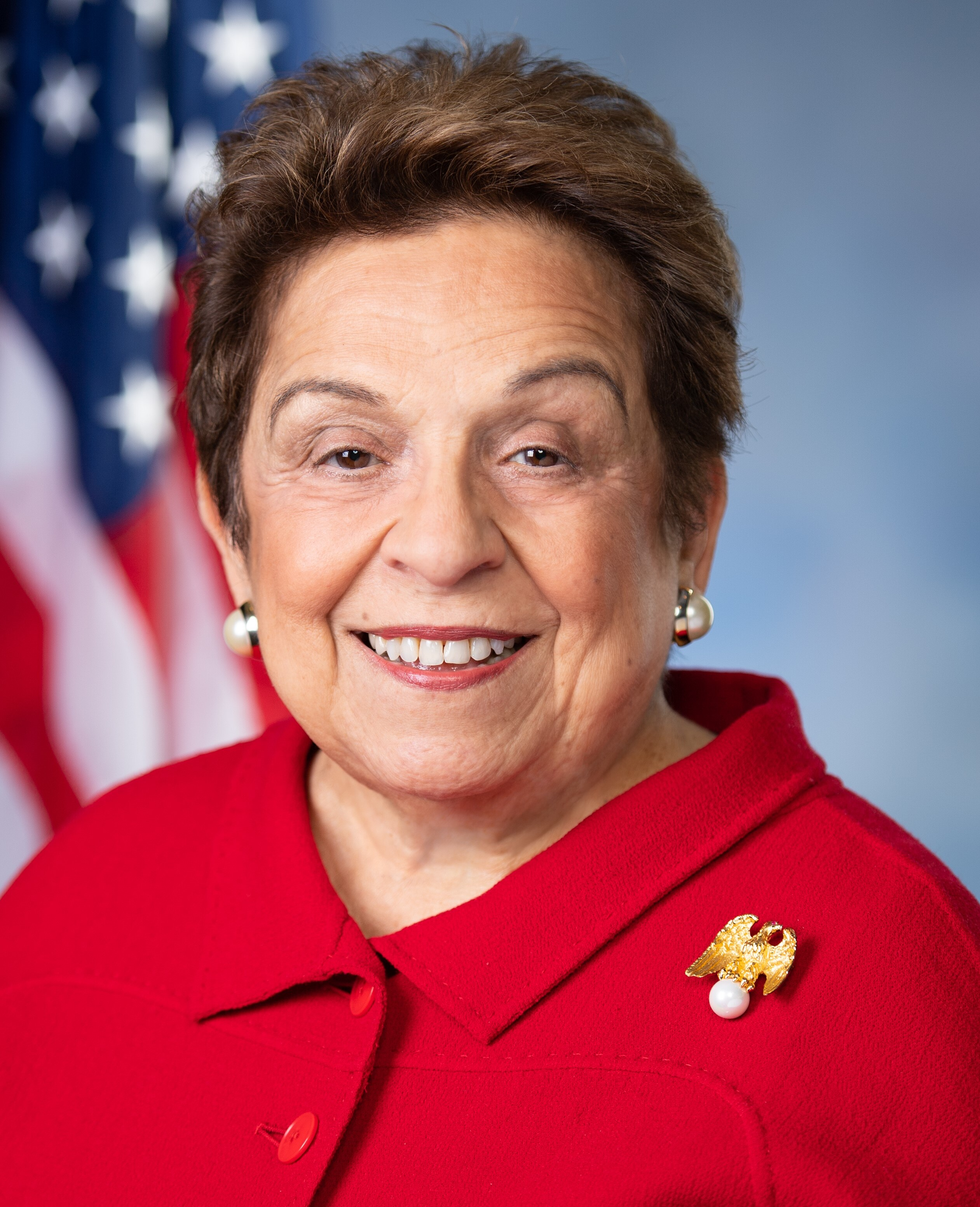

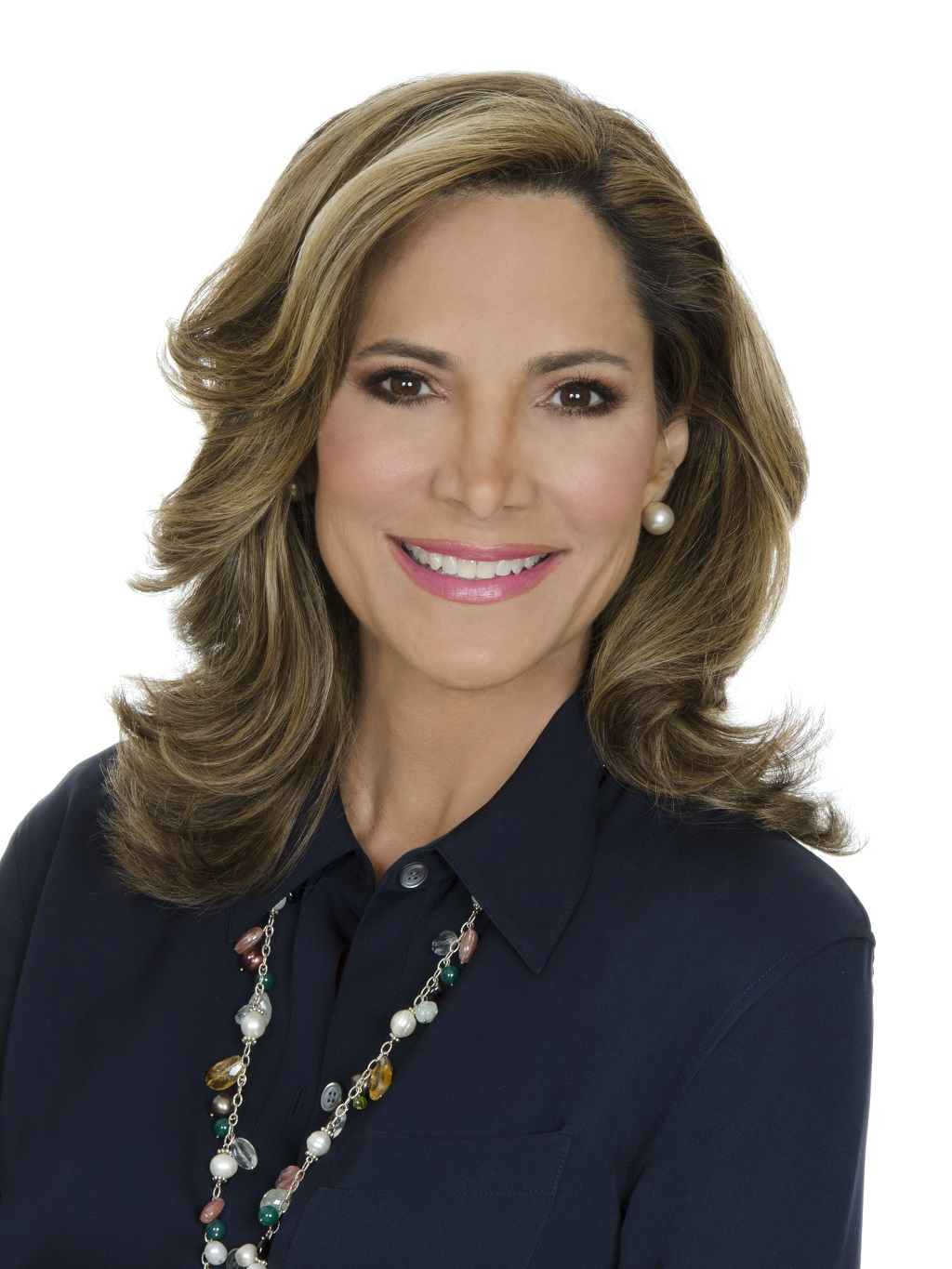
Nominee	Donna Shalala	María Elvira Salazar
Party	Democratic	Republican
Popular vote	130,743	115,588
Percentage	51.8%	45.8%
- County results Shalala: 50–60%
U.S. Representative before election
Ileana Ros-Lehtinen
Republican
Elected U.S. Representative
Donna Shalala
Democratic

The 27th district is located in the Miami metro area, including Coral Gables, Kendall, Miami Beach, and portions of Miami. Incumbent Republican Ileana Ros-Lehtinen, who had represented the district since 2013 and previously represented the 18th district from 1989 to 2013, retired from office in 2018. She was re-elected with 54.9% of the vote in 2016. The district had a PVI of D+5.

=== Republican primary ===
==== Candidates ====
===== Nominee =====
- Maria Elvira Salazar, journalist

===== Eliminated in primary =====
- Elizabeth Adadi, U.S. Army veteran
- Bruno Barreiro, Miami-Dade County Commissioner
- Angie Chirino, songwriter (daughter of Cuban-American musician Willy Chirino)
- Mike Ohevzion, businessman
- Maria Peiro, educator and candidate for this district in 2016
- Bettina Rodriguez-Aguilera, former Doral City Councilwoman
- Gina Sosa, filmmaker

===== Withdrawn =====
- Stephen Marks, political consultant (endorsed Donna Shalala, remained on ballot)
- Raquel Regalado, former Miami-Dade School Board member and candidate for Mayor of Miami-Dade County in 2016

===== Declined =====
- Jeb Bush Jr., son of former governor Jeb Bush
- Carlos Curbelo, incumbent U.S. Representative for the 26th district
- Miguel Díaz de la Portilla, former state senator
- José Félix Díaz, state representative
- Art Estopinan, former chief of staff to U.S. Representative Ileana Ros-Lehtinen
- Anitere Flores, state senator
- René García, state senator
- Carlos López-Cantera, Lieutenant Governor of Florida and candidate for U.S. Senate in 2016
- Ed MacDougall, former mayor of Cutler Bay and candidate for this seat in 2014
- Jeanette Núñez, state representative
- Juan C. Zapata, former Miami-Dade County Commissioner

==== Endorsements ====
Bettina Rodriguez Aguilera

Newspapers

- Miami Herald

==== Polling ====
Poll source	Date(s) administered	Sample size	Margin of error	Bruno Barreiro	Maria Elvira Salazar	Other	Undecided
McLaughlin & Associates (R-Salazar)	August 14–16, 2018	300	± 5.7%	16%	40%	17%	27%
Big Data Poll (Chirino)	June 22–25, 2018	531	± 4.0%	17%	27%	31%	25%
McLaughlin & Associates (R-Salazar)	June 11–14, 2018	400	± 4.9%	16%	38%	10%	36%
Magellan Strategies (R-Barreiro)	June 11–12, 2018	401	± 4.9%	10%	24%	0%	67%

==== Primary results ====
Republican primary results
Party	Candidate	Votes	%
Republican	Maria Elvira Salazar	15,812	40.5
Republican	Bruno Barreiro	10,026	25.7
Republican	Maria Peiro	3,120	8.0
Republican	Stephen Marks	2,733	7.0
Republican	Angie Chirino	2,677	6.9
Republican	Bettina Rodriguez-Aguilera	1,684	4.3
Republican	Mike Ohevzion	1,467	3.8
Republican	Elizabeth Adadi	775	2.0
Republican	Gina Sosa	760	1.9
Total votes		39,054	100.0

=== Democratic primary ===
Florida's 27th district has been included on the initial list of Republican-held seats being targeted by the Democratic Congressional Campaign Committee in 2018.

==== Candidates ====
===== Nominee =====
- Donna Shalala, former U.S. Secretary of Health and Human Services and former president of the University of Miami

===== Eliminated in primary =====
- Matt Haggman, Miami program director of the Knight Foundation and former Miami Herald reporter
- Michael Hepburn, University of Miami academic adviser and candidate for state house in 2010 and 2014
- David Richardson, state representative
- Kristen Rosen Gonzalez, Miami Beach city commissioner

===== Withdrawn =====
- Mary Barzee Flores, attorney and former Eleventh Judicial Circuit Court of Florida judge (running for FL-25)
- Scott Fuhrman, businessman and candidate for Congress in 2016
- José Javier Rodríguez, state senator
- Ken Russell, Miami City Commissioner

===== Declined =====
- Alberto Carvalho, Miami-Dade County Public Schools Superintendent
- Francisco Cerezo, attorney
- Manny Diaz, former mayor of Miami
- Cindy Lerner, former mayor of Pinecrest and former state representative
- Philip Levine, Mayor of Miami Beach
- Daniella Levine Cava, Miami-Dade County Commissioner
- Jimmy Morales, Miami Beach City Manager
- Mark Person
- Marc Sarnoff, former Miami City Commissioner

==== Endorsements ====
David Richardson

Organizations

- LGBTQ Victory Fund
- SAVE Dade

Individuals

- Scott Fuhrman, businessman and nominee for this seat in 2016
Michael Hepburn

Organizations

- Brand New Congress
- Justice Democrats

Individuals

- Alexandria Ocasio-Cortez, educator, community organizer, and political activist of Puerto Rican ancestry; nominee for NY-14 in 2018

==== Polling ====
Poll source	Date(s) administered	Sample size	Margin of error	Matt Haggman	Michael Hepburn	David Richardson	Kristen Rosen-Gonzalez	Donna Shalala	Undecided
Bendixen & Amandi Research (D-Shalala)	August 10–16, 2018	600	± 4.0%	10%	2%	18%	9%	36%	25%
Frederick Polls (D-Richardson)	August 6–7, 2018	300	± 5.6%	9%	4%	20%	7%	32%	28%
RABA Research (D-Haggman)	August 2–5, 2018	433	± 4.7%	16%	4%	15%	11%	26%	27%
Bendixen & Amandi Research (D-Shalala)	June 2–8, 2018	600	± 4.0%	5%	2%	16%	8%	43%	26%

==== Primary results ====
Democratic primary results
Party	Candidate	Votes	%
Democratic	Donna Shalala	14,153	31.9
Democratic	David Richardson	12,191	27.5
Democratic	Kristen Rosen-Gonzalez	7,783	17.5
Democratic	Matt Haggman	7,510	16.9
Democratic	Michael Hepburn	2,723	6.1
Total votes		44,360	100.0

=== Independent campaign of Mayra Joli ===
Mayra Joli, a Dominican-American immigration attorney and former beauty pageant contestant, ran as a pro-Donald Trump independent candidate.

Joli later, in 2020, would attract brief national attention in 2020 after sitting in the crowd behind Trump and showing animated enthusiasm during a 2020 presidential election town hall event on NBC, at which attendees were advertised to be undecided voters. She attempted to run for mayor of Miami in 2021, but was disqualified due to her primary residence being located outside of the city.

=== General election ===
==== Endorsements ====
Maria Elvira Salazar (R)

Organizations

- BIPAC
- National Republican Congressional Committee "Young Guns" Program
Donna Shalala (D)

Labor unions

- International Brotherhood of Boilermakers

Organizations

- EMILY's List
- MoveOn

==== Polling ====
Poll source	Date(s) administered	Sample size	Margin of error	Maria Elvira Salazar (R)	Donna Shalala (D)	Mayra Joli (I)	Undecided
ALG Research (D)	October 25–28, 2018	500	± 4.4%	44%	49%	–	–
NYT Upshot/Siena College	October 15–19, 2018	542	± 5.0%	37%	44%	4%	15%
ALG Research (D-Shalala)	October 11–14, 2018	500	± 4.4%	39%	44%	–	10%
McLaughlin & Associates (R-Salazar)	October 11–14, 2018	400	–	50%	41%	–	–
Mason-Dixon	October 1–6, 2018	625	± 4.0%	44%	42%	1%	13%
McLaughlin & Associates (R-Salazar)	September 10–13, 2018	400	± 4.9%	51%	42%	–	7%
Bendixen & Amandi Research (D-Shalala)	August 29 – September 2, 2018	600	± 4.0%	42%	46%	8%	4%

Hypothetical polling

Poll source	Date(s) administered	Sample size	Margin of error	Generic Republican	Generic Democrat	Other	Undecided
Public Policy Polling (D)	February 12–14, 2018	620	± 3.9%	39%	54%	–	7%

==== Predictions ====
Source	Ranking	As of
The Cook Political Report	Lean D (flip)	November 5, 2018
Inside Elections	Lean D (flip)	November 5, 2018
Sabato's Crystal Ball	Lean D (flip)	November 5, 2018
RCP	Tossup	November 5, 2018
Daily Kos	Lean D (flip)	November 5, 2018
538	Likely D (flip)	November 7, 2018
CNN	Tossup	October 31, 2018
Politico	Tossup	November 2, 2018

==== Results ====
Florida's 27th congressional district, 2018
Party	Candidate	Votes	%
Democratic	Donna Shalala	130,743	51.8
Republican	Maria Elvira Salazar	115,588	45.8
Independent	Mayra Joli	6,255	2.5
Total votes		252,586	100.0
Democratic gain from Republican			

== See also ==
- 2018 United States House of Representatives elections
- 2018 United States elections

== Notes ==
Official campaign websites
- District 1
  - Matt Gaetz (R) for Congress
  - Jennifer Zimmerman (D) for Congress
- District 2
  - Neal Dunn (R) for Congress
  - Bob Rackleff (D) for Congress
- District 3
  - Yvonne Hayes Hinson (D) for Congress
  - Ted Yoho (R) for Congress Archived 2018-07-24 at the Wayback Machine
- District 4
  - Joceline Berrios (I) for Congress
  - Jason Bulger (I) for Congress
  - John Rutherford (R) for Congress
  - Ges Selmont (D) for Congress Archived 2018-07-24 at the Wayback Machine
- District 5
  - Virginia Fuller (R) for Congress
  - Al Lawson (D) for Congress
- District 6
  - Nancy Soderberg (D) for Congress Archived 2017-08-24 at the Wayback Machine
  - Michael Waltz (R) for Congress Archived 2018-07-13 at the Wayback Machine
- District 7
  - Mike Miller (R) for Congress
  - Stephanie Murphy (D) for Congress
- District 8
  - Sanjay Patel (D) for Congress
  - Bill Posey (R) for Congress
- District 9
  - Wayne Liebnitzky (R) for Congress
  - Darren Soto (D) for Congress
- District 10
  - Val Demings (D) for Congress
- District 11
  - Dana Cottrell (D) for Congress
  - Daniel Webster (R) for Congress
- District 12
  - Gus Bilirakis (R) for Congress
  - Chris Hunter (D) for Congress
  - Angelika Purkis (I) for Congress
- District 13
  - George Buck (R) for Congress
  - Charlie Crist (D) for Congress Archived 2023-03-11 at the Wayback Machine
- District 14
  - Kathy Castor (D) for Congress
- District 15
  - Kristen Carlson (D) for Congress
  - Ross Spano (R) for Congress
- District 16
  - Vern Buchanan (R) for Congress
  - David Shapiro (D) for Congress
- District 17
  - Allen Ellison (D) for Congress
  - Greg Steube (R) for Congress
- District 18
  - Lauren Baer (D) for Congress
  - Brian Mast (R) for Congress
- District 19
  - David Holden (D) for Congress
  - Francis Rooney (R) for Congress
- District 20
  - Alcee Hastings (D) for Congress
- District 21
  - Lois Frankel (D) for Congress
- District 22
  - Ted Deutch (D) for Congress Archived 2020-07-11 at the Wayback Machine
  - Nicolas Kimaz (R) for Congress
- District 23
  - Tim Canova (I) for Congress Archived 2017-08-24 at the Wayback Machine
  - Don Endriss (I) for Congress
  - Joe Kaufman (R) for Congress
  - Debbie Wasserman Schultz (D) for Congress
- District 24
  - Frederica Wilson (D) for Congress
- District 25
  - Mario Díaz-Balart (R) for Congress
  - Mary Barzee Flores (D) for Congress
- District 26
  - Carlos Curbelo (R) for Congress
  - Debbie Mucarsel-Powell (D) for Congress
- District 27
  - María Elvira Salazar (R) for Congress
  - Donna Shalala (D) for Congress
