= NXT Arrival =

2014 WWE Network event

- Promotional poster featuring Adrian Neville and Bo Dallas
- Promotion: WWE
- Brand: NXT
- Date: February 27, 2014
- City: Winter Park, Florida
- Venue: Full Sail University
- Attendance: 400+

WWE event chronology
← Previous; Elimination Chamber	Next → WrestleMania XXX

NXT major events chronology
← Previous; First	Next → TakeOver

NXT Arrival (stylized as NXT ArRIVAL) was a professional wrestling livestreaming event produced by WWE, held exclusively for wrestlers from the promotion's developmental territory, NXT. It took place on Thursday, February 27, 2014, at NXT's home venue at the time, Full Sail University in Winter Park, Florida. The event was broadcast exclusively on the WWE Network and was WWE's first professional wrestling event to be livestreamed on the platform, which launched just three days prior. This was also NXT's first major event, which was succeeded by the NXT TakeOver series.

Six professional wrestling matches were contested during the event. In the main event, Adrian Neville defeated Bo Dallas in a ladder match to win the NXT Championship. The card also featured Paige defeating Emma to retain the NXT Women's Championship and Cesaro defeating Sami Zayn in the opening bout. The event was praised by critics, but some experienced technical issues viewing the livestream, which WWE later acknowledged.

== Production ==
=== Background ===
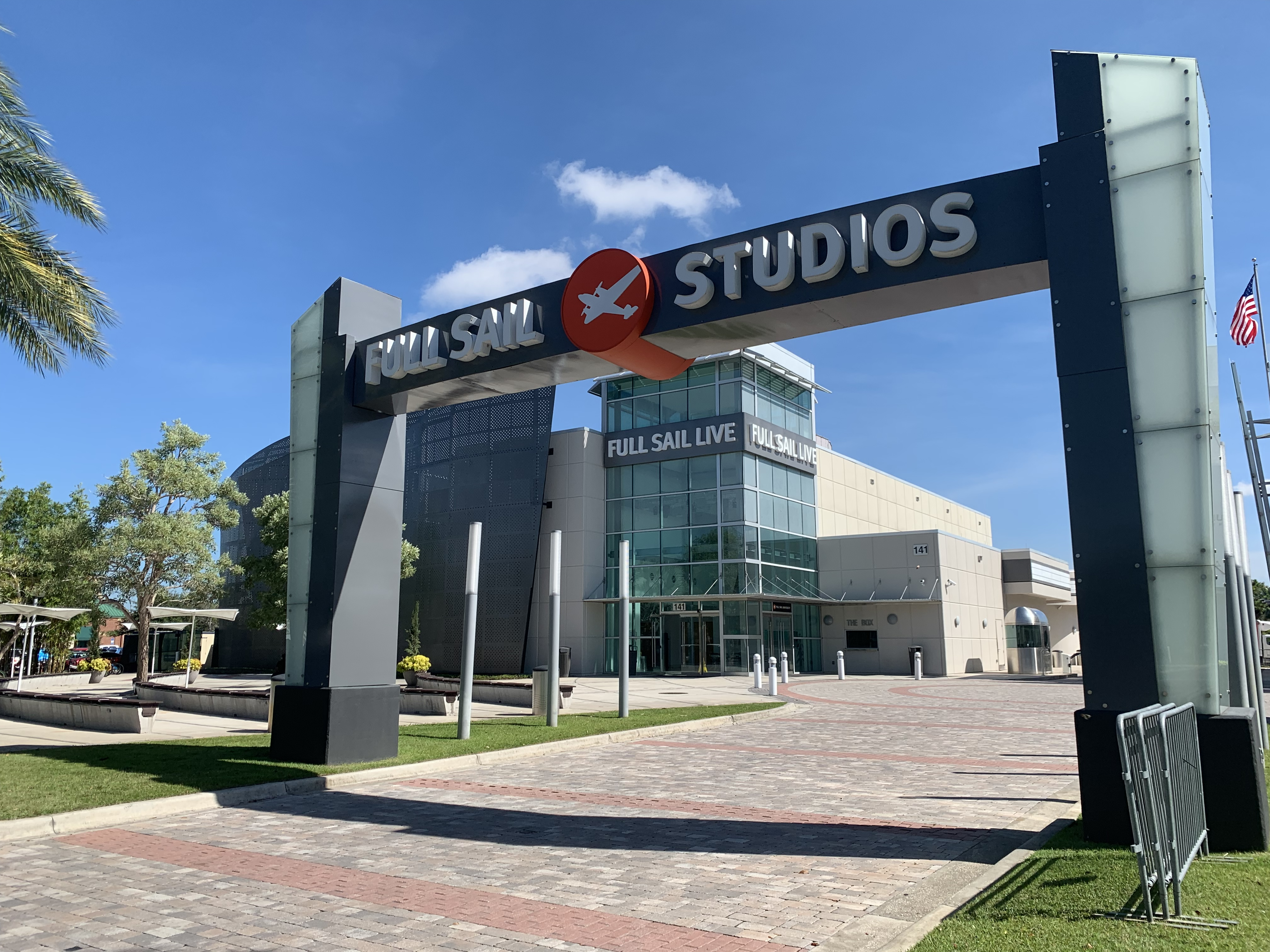
The event was held at NXT's home venue at the time, Full Sail University in Winter Park, Florida.

In 2012, the professional wrestling company WWE restructured its NXT brand from being a reality-based competition television show to a developmental territory for their main roster. In 2014, the promotion scheduled its first livestreaming special for NXT titled Arrival (stylized ArRIVAL). The event was scheduled to be held on Thursday, February 27, 2014, at the brand's home venue at the time, Full Sail University in Winter Park, Florida. The event aired exclusively on the WWE Network, and was WWE's first live event to be broadcast on the platform, which launched three days prior to the event.

=== Storylines ===
The card comprised six matches that resulted from scripted storylines. Results were predetermined by WWE's writers on the NXT brand, while storylines were produced on WWE's weekly television program, NXT.

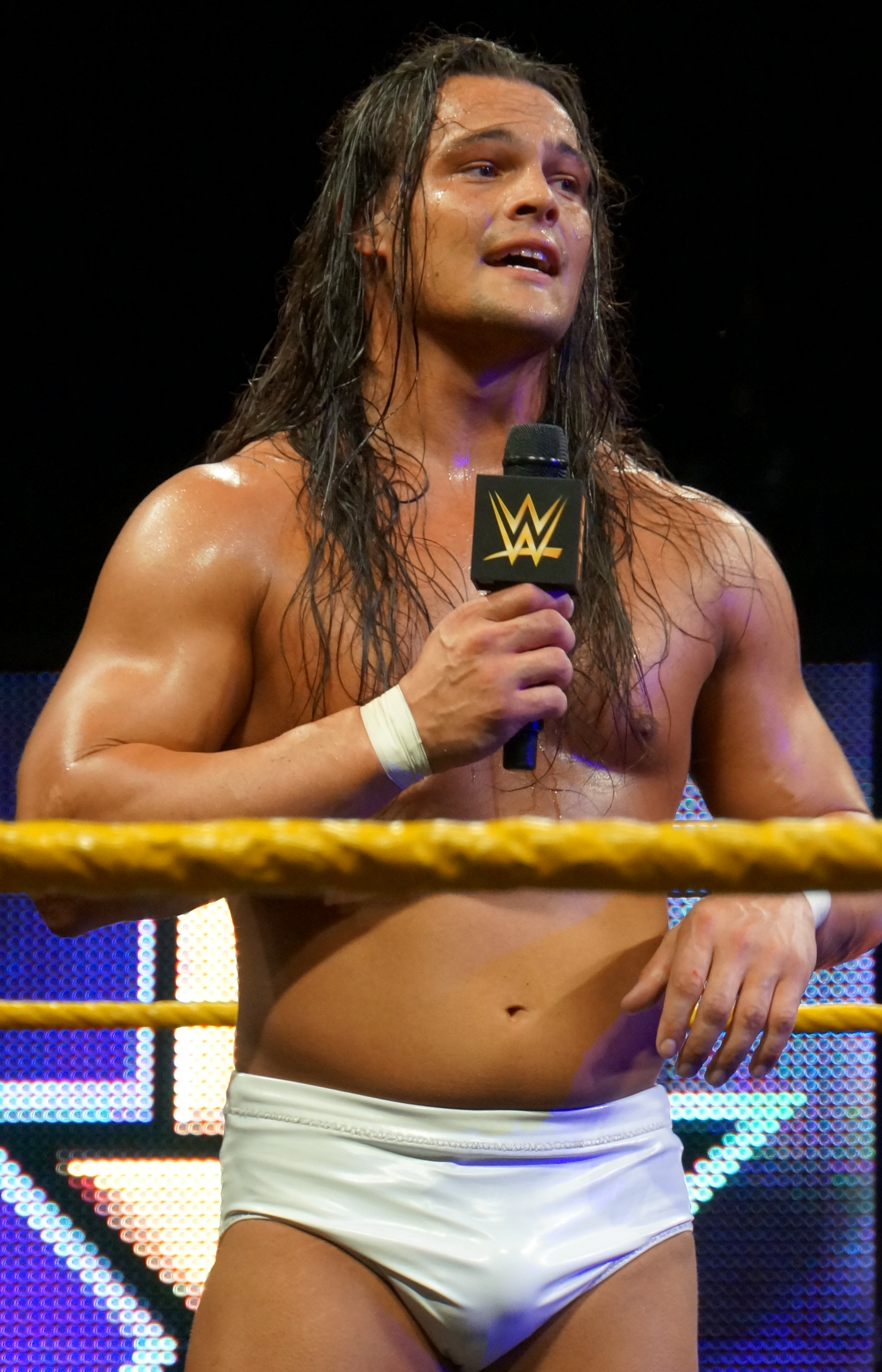
Bo Dallas, the defending NXT Champion heading into Arrival.

Three matches were promoted for the event. The main event featured Bo Dallas defending the NXT Championship against Adrian Neville in a ladder match. Neville first won a number one contender match (against Sami Zayn) for Dallas' title on the November 27, 2013, episode of NXT. Neville faced Dallas for the title on the next episode and won by count-out, which meant that the title did not change hands. Two episodes later, Neville faced Dallas again for the title in a lumberjack match, but lost when lumberjack Tyler Breeze interfered. Neville once again became number one contender after Dallas failed to defeat Neville in a beat-the-clock challenge match on the January 22 episode of NXT that arose due to Dallas' boasting. On the February 5 episode of NXT, Triple H announced that the championship match would be a ladder match at NXT Arrival.

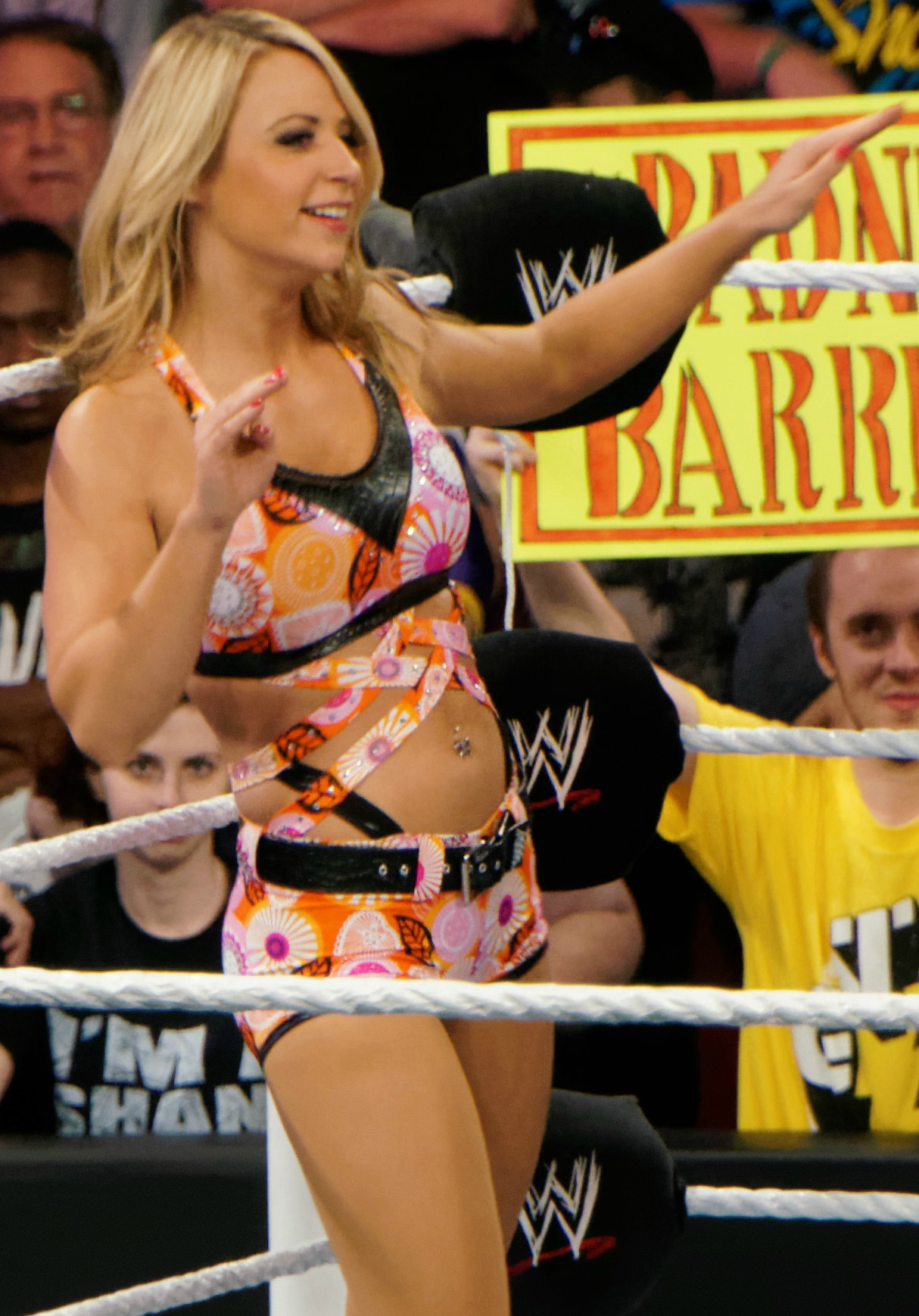
Emma, the challenger for the NXT Women's Championship at Arrival.

The NXT Women's Championship was defended at NXT Arrival by Paige against Emma. Back on the July 24, 2013 episode of NXT, Paige defeated Emma in the finals of the tournament to crown the inaugural NXT Women's Champion. Emma earned number one contendership status to Paige's title on the August 7 episode of NXT by winning a dance-off. Emma later successfully defended her number one contender status against Natalya on the January 1, 2014 NXT. It was announced on the February 12 episode of NXT that Emma would receive her championship match at NXT Arrival.

Cesaro and Sami Zayn's rivalry started on the May 22, 2013 episode of NXT where Zayn made his NXT television debut and scored an upset win over Cesaro, which was the second match he won on that episode. Cesaro then won the second and third matches of their series, the latter being a two-out-of-three falls match in August 2013. On the January 22, 2014 episode of NXT, Zayn revealed that he had been obsessing about his last match with Cesaro, because "they called [it] the best match all year" but Zayn had lost that match. Thus, he challenged Cesaro to another rematch, who declined. On the February 12 episode of NXT, Cesaro denied Zayn's challenge again, but Triple H instead made the rematch official for NXT Arrival.

== Event ==
The event started with NXT's head of creative Triple H proclaiming that "NXT is the next generation, and the next generation has arrived". The commentators for the event were Tom Phillips, William Regal, and Byron Saxton. The pre-show panel consisted of Bret Hart, Kevin Nash, Paul Heyman, and Renee Young. It was shown at different times during the event that Orange County Mayor Teresa Jacobs, Full Sail University President Garry Jones, as well as Ric Flair, Pat Patterson, Dusty Rhodes, and John Cena were in attendance at ringside.

=== Preliminary matches ===
In the first match, Cesaro defeated Sami Zayn. In the first half of the match, Zayn dove through the ropes looking for a tornado DDT, only for Cesaro to intercept with a European uppercut. Cesaro went on to target Zayn's left knee. In the second half of the match, Cesaro attempted to superplex Zayn from the apron into the ring, but Zayn countered and tried to perform a frankensteiner to Cesaro. Cesaro countered to try a superbomb, but Zayn reversed to successfully perform the frankensteiner. Zayn then hit his signature "Helluva Kick" to Cesaro, but Cesaro kicked out of the resulting pin. Cesaro then repeatedly implored Zayn to stay down, but Zayn kept getting up to receive more European uppercuts. Cesaro attempted his signature "Neutralizer", but Zayn countered and went on to hit a sunset flip powerbomb, but it was not enough to win the match. Cesaro then hit a European uppercut after throwing Zayn into the air, but Zayn kicked out of a pin at one. Cesaro hit a discus European uppercut and then performed the "Neutralizer" on Zayn for the victory. After the match, Cesaro hugged Zayn.

Mojo Rawley defeated CJ Parker in the show's second match. Rawley picked up the win with two stinger splashes, a hip attack and the "Hyper Driver".

In the show's third match, The Ascension (Konnor and Viktor) successfully defended their NXT Tag Team Championship against mystery opponents Too Cool (Scotty 2 Hotty and Grandmaster Sexay). Near the end of the match, Viktor countered Scotty's signature "Worm" maneuver, leading to the Ascension hitting their double-team "Fall of Man" maneuver for the victory.

The fourth match (which received a pre-match endorsement from Stephanie McMahon) featured Paige retaining her NXT Women's Championship over Emma. Paige managed to prevent Emma from applying her "Emma Lock" submission hold during the match and also withstood several other holds applied by Emma. When Paige attempted a superplex, Emma countered with a sitout powerbomb on Paige, but it was not enough to secure a win. A frustrated Emma slapped Paige, who retaliated with her signature "Paige Turner". Yet, Emma became the first person to kick out of the "Paige Turner". Paige responded by applying the "Paige Tapout" submission hold, which was enough for the victory when Emma submitted. Paige embraced Emma after the match.

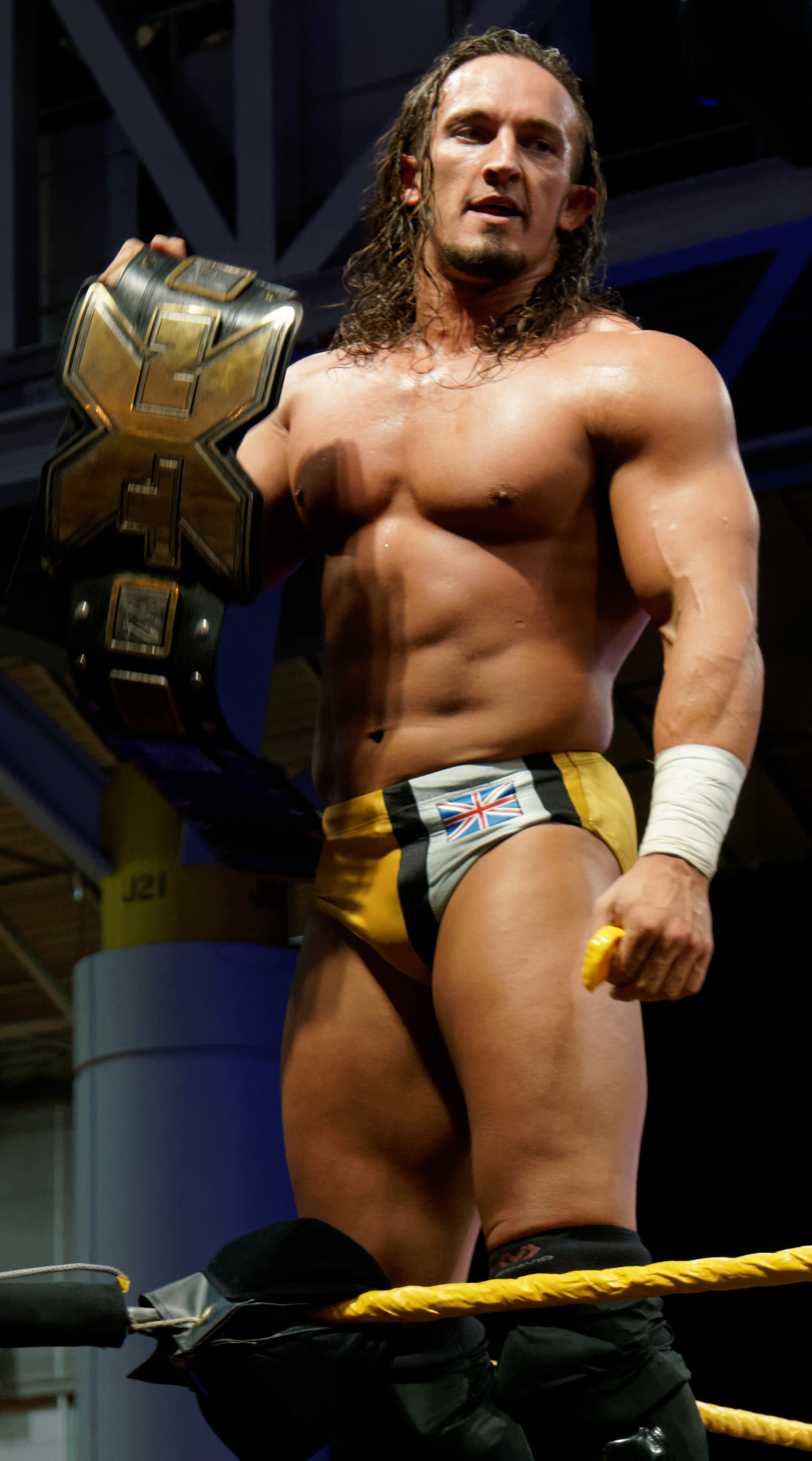
Adrian Neville captured the NXT Championship in the main event.

The next match saw Tyler Breeze taking on Xavier Woods. As the match started, they were interrupted by Alexander Rusev and Lana. Rusev caused a no contest when he attacked both Breeze and Woods; Breeze received a Samoan drop and Woods was placed in "The Accolade" submission hold.

=== Main event ===
The main event match (which received a pre-match endorsement from Shawn Michaels) saw Adrian Neville challenging Bo Dallas in NXT's first-ever ladder match for the NXT Championship. In the first half of the match, Dallas attempted to climb a ladder while he pinned Neville under the ladder, but Neville used his legs to push the ladder over. Near the end of the match, Neville attempted his signature "Red Arrow", but Dallas pushed him off the ropes to the apron and the floor. Neville recovered and used the ropes to springboard over a climbing Dallas and leapfrog him on the ladder. In response, Dallas powerbombed Neville onto a ladder in the corner of the ring. Dallas then charged while holding a ladder, but Neville kicked the ladder into Dallas' face and slammed Dallas onto the ladder. Neville climbed to the top rope and dove off with his "Red Arrow" while Dallas was on the ladder. This incapacitated Dallas long enough for Neville to set up and climb the ladder to retrieve the NXT Championship hanging above the ring. The show ended with Neville celebrating with his new championship.

== Reception ==
The Wrestling Observer Newsletter reported that about 200 ticket holders who had purchased tickets were not allowed in because Full Sail University had oversold the 400-seat theater. The newsletter also received a lot of feedback on people unable to watch the show. "Some had the Roku box problems that have plagued the network from the start", but most said their feed cut out at the Breeze-Woods match. WWE later revealed that the initial number of WWE Network subscribers by April 1 was 495,000, which would be the maximum number of people who could have watched the show.

NXT Arrival was well received by critics. Aaron Oster of the Baltimore Sun described the event as fantastic, but "marred by technical issues". He streamed the show live and the stream cut out from Breeze-Woods, which caused him to miss that match and half of the main event. Technical issues aside, Oster felt that Arrival "was a phenomenal show that gave the WWE a chance to show off the NXT roster". He also stated that all three promoted matches met or exceeded his expectations. Cesaro and Zayn's match "wasn't the same as their previous encounters, and they actually built on it" and that "they actually told the story that they knew each other well in the ring, and used it to put on a fantastic 20-minute match". Oster gave high praise to the women's match, he thought it "was better than nearly all of the Divas matches on the main roster for the past few years, featuring some strong chain wrestling and submission moves." He also noted that Emma's sitout powerbomb sparked the crowd to chant "Better than Batista". For the main event, Oster felt that there were "some interesting spots with some good storytelling, even if there weren't the typical brutal spots associated with a ladder match", so it was not "overly special" but still "pretty good". Lastly, Oster praised the announcers, who "worked perfectly together in a traditional sports style, which truly added to the broadcast. WWE should really consider going back to this format for the main shows".

Justin James of the Professional Wrestling Torch Newsletter praised the event, stating "I would gladly have paid PPV money for this" and "if Raw had this kind of quality, I would gladly sign up for a three-hour show." He also pointed out that there were no commercial breaks or dead time, making the event "mighty close in total content to a three-hour Raw". James wrote that the "announcing team was perfect tonight, no bickering, no fake feuds, no 'storytelling' for things outside the ring", especially "in the opening match, where it was clear that they were completely invested in the match". He also wrote that Cesaro-Zayn was "match of the year by a country mile", describing it as "better, more emotionally intense, and more exciting than anything WWE has put on since their previous encounter". "Some of the sequences in here had 5+ counters strung together" and there was "hard hitting action".

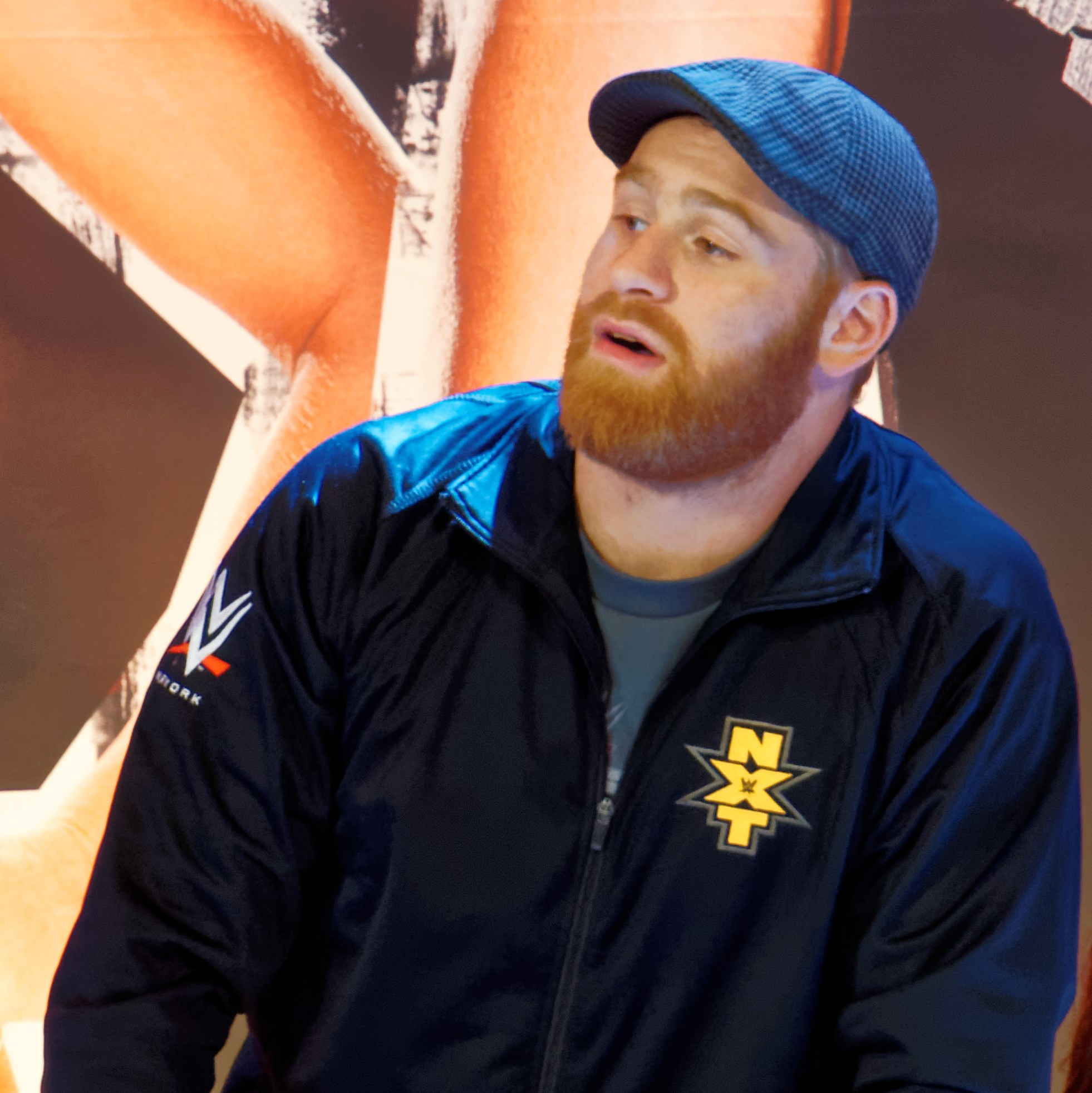
Sami Zayn's match received high praise from critics.

James felt that the Ascension's title match was bland, but he liked that their characters had gone from cheesy to serious. James said that the women's match was fantastic and he "loved the small touches", while praising Paige's new look, saying that it "just exudes danger". For the main event, James said that "this didn't feel like a ladder match. Dallas simply did not take the risks needed to show that he really wanted to retain his title". However, he was not disappointed because he did not "expect too much from a Bo Dallas match". James felt that it was a problem to close the show with Dallas-Neville because "the show could only go down" from Cesaro-Zayn. Lastly, James had some technical issues viewing the live stream of the event, where the video paused during the Cesaro-Zayn match, and the feed cut out during Rusev's appearance, but returned before the main event match started.

Sky Sports summed up the event that "WWE's stars of tomorrow showed they are ready for the limelight now by engaging in some brilliant bouts" and "some quite spectacular wrestling". The Dallas-Neville main event was described as "high-octane", while the Cesaro-Zayn match being a "near 23-minute epic" that "also lived up to the hype" and "earned the fans' seal of approval once more".

The Canadian Online Explorer's Nolan Howell gave a positive review, awarding the entire event 4 stars out of 5. He went on to rate each match of NXT Arrival out of 5 stars (*****). The Cesaro-Zayn match was the highest rated at a full *****. The Rawley-Parker match was rated *3/4 and the Ascension-Too Cool title match **1/4. Howell rated the Paige-Emma title match ***3/4 stars and did not rate the Breeze-Woods match. Finally, Howell rated the main event Dallas-Neville match ***1/4.

== Aftermath ==
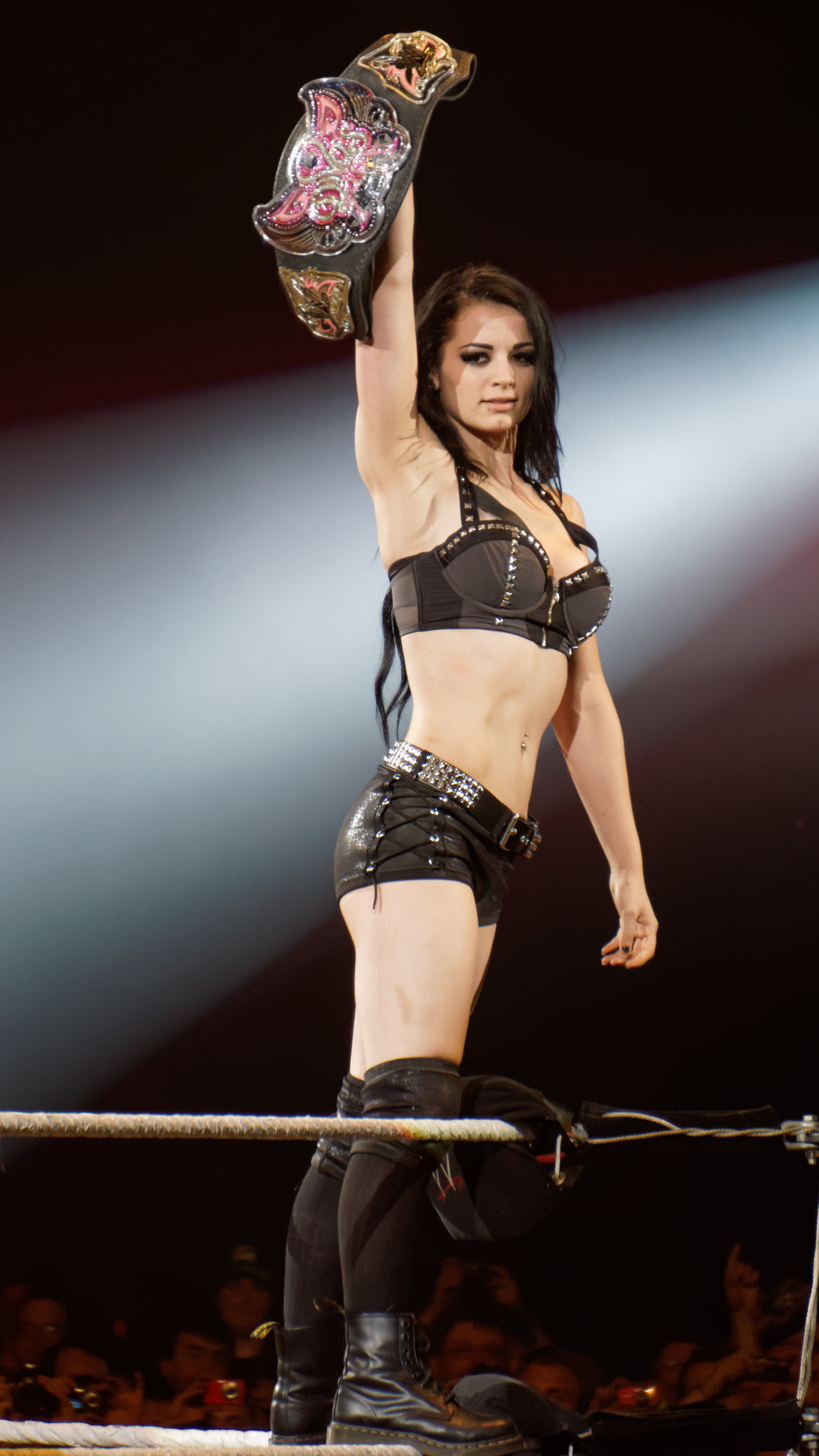
Paige debuted on the main roster less than two months after NXT Arrival and immediately won the WWE Divas Championship.

In response to viewers who had technical issues watching the show, WWE released the following statement.

During tonight's live NXT Arrival special, we unfortunately experienced technical difficulties, which are to be expected when launching a new digital network. We will work aggressively to solve these glitches and deliver quality service. The complete event will be available on-demand [on the WWE Network] overnight.

After NXT Arrival, new NXT Champion Adrian Neville continued to feud with former champion Bo Dallas, who received a rematch for the title on the March 27 episode of NXT; Neville defeated Dallas to retain his title and end the feud. Meanwhile, Sami Zayn moved on to feud with Corey Graves, who had criticized Zayn for not winning a match for some time.

Less than two months later at WrestleMania XXX on April 6, Cesaro had a big moment at WrestleMania; in a scene reminiscent of Hulk Hogan's momentous body slam of André the Giant, with only Cesaro (who had also wrestled on the pre-show) and Big Show remaining in the battle royal held as a memorial to André, Cesaro body-slammed Big Show over the top rope to win the match.

A day later on the post-WrestleMania Raw on April 7, Paige made an unannounced main roster debut and was immediately challenged to a title match by WWE Divas Champion AJ Lee; Paige won that match to capture the WWE Divas Championship and become a double champion. Also on the post-WrestleMania Raw, Alexander Rusev won his first singles match on the main roster, and introductory videos for Bo Dallas started airing. On the April 24 episode of NXT, due to her elevation to the WWE main roster and win of the WWE Divas Championship, Paige was forced to relinquish her NXT Women's Championship.

The second live special for NXT was called NXT TakeOver and was held on May 29, during which Charlotte won the vacant NXT Women's Championship. The third live special episode was called NXT TakeOver: Fatal 4-Way was held on September 11; during which the Ascension's reign as NXT Tag Team Champions ended at the hands of The Lucha Dragons (Kalisto and Sin Cara). At the fourth live special episode, NXT TakeOver: R Evolution on December 11, 2014, Adrian Neville lost the NXT Championship to Sami Zayn. The "TakeOver" would continue as brand name for NXT's live shows up until late 2021.

Bo Dallas returned to the main roster on the May 23 episode of SmackDown. The Ascension were promoted to the main roster on the December 29 episode of Raw. Neville was promoted to the main roster on the post-WrestleMania Raw on March 30, 2015. CJ Parker left WWE in April 2015.

== Results ==
No.	Results	Stipulations	Times
1^{D}	Mason Ryan defeated Sylvester Lefort by pinfall	Singles match	—
2	Cesaro defeated Sami Zayn by pinfall	Singles match	22:55
3	Mojo Rawley defeated CJ Parker by pinfall	Singles match	3:25
4	The Ascension (Konnor and Viktor) (c) defeated Too Cool (Grand Master Sexay and Scotty 2 Hotty) by pinfall	Tag team match for the NXT Tag Team Championship	6:40
5	Paige (c) defeated Emma by submission	Singles match for the NXT Women's Championship	12:54
6	Tyler Breeze vs. Xavier Woods ended in a no contest	Singles match	0:35
7	Adrian Neville defeated Bo Dallas (c)	Ladder match for the NXT Championship	16:04
(c) / – the champion(s) heading into the match; D / – this was a dark match
