= 2014 Orange County, Florida mayoral election =

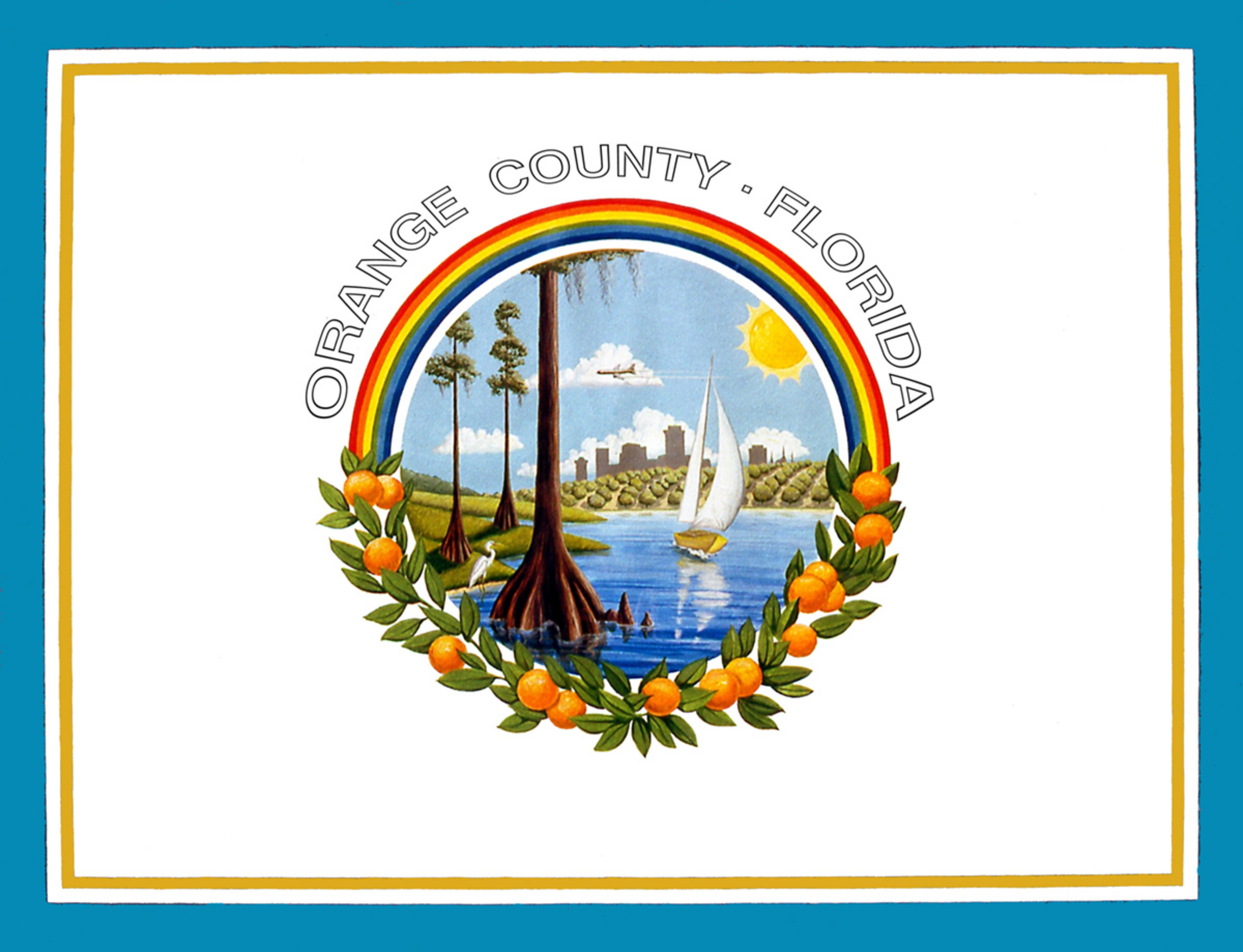
- August 26, 2014
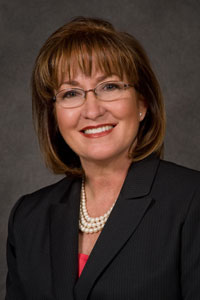
Candidate	Teresa Jacobs
Party	Nonpartisan
Popular vote	Unopposed
Percentage	100.00%
Mayor before election
Teresa Jacobs
Nonpartisan
Elected mayor
Teresa Jacobs
Nonpartisan

The 2014 Orange County, Florida mayoral election was held on August 26, 2014, to select the Mayor of Orange County, Florida. Incumbent Mayor Teresa Jacobs ran for re-election to a second term. Though she was originally set to face former Orlando Police Department Police Chief Val Demings, Demings dropped out of the race, and Jacobs was elected unopposed.

== General election ==
=== Candidates ===
- Teresa Jacobs, incumbent County Mayor

==== Dropped out ====
- Val Demings, former Chief of the Orlando Police Department, 2012 Democratic nominee for Congress
- Jeffrey Clyde Tepper (write-in)

==== Disqualified ====
- Dunel A. Cadely, private driver, nonprofit executive

=== Campaign ===
Jacobs was elected in 2010 in a landslide, but anticipated a difficult campaign for re-election against Demings. In Jacobs' first term, she weathered controversy over "textgate," a scandal in which Jacobs and members of the County Commission deleted text message exchanges with lobbyists while considering a proposed sick leave proposal. State Attorney Jeff Ashton requested that the Florida Department of Law Enforcement investigate whether members of the County Commission violated the state's public records laws. On August 28, 2013, Ashton announced that Jacobs and four county commissioners illegally deleted text messages, which resulted the imposition of $500 fines against Jacobs and the county commissioners, and a $90,000 settlement to a voter group advocating for sick leave.

Despite the scandal, as Jacobs began her re-election campaign, she remained popular with county voters.

After months of speculation as to whether Demigns would run, she announced her candidacy on January 9, 2014. Demings argued that her experience as Chief of Police, in which she "manage[d] over 1,000 law-enforcement employees and cut crime and corruption," would help her "make Orange County . . . the place every single one of us envisions and can be proud of." Demings was endorsed by EMILY's List and prominent local Democrats, but entered the race after Jacobs had raised several hundred thousand dollars and struggled to raise money.

Though the race was formally nonpartisan, both candidates faced opposition from within their own parties. Former Orange County Chairman Linda Chapin, a Democrat, endorsed Jacobs for re-election and hosted a fundraiser for her, while former Republican State Representative Chris Dorworth sought to recruit a Republican opponent to Jacobs.

Demings unexpectedly announced on May 20, that she was exiting the race, leaving Jacobs as the favorite for re-election. After Demings' exit, Dunel A. Cadely, a vehicle for hire driver and nonprofit executive, and write-in candidate Jeffrey Clyde Tepper filed to run against Jacobs. But Cadely was disqualified when the check he used to pay his filing fee bounced, leaving Tepper as Jacobs's only challenger. In July, Tepper dropped out of the race, leaving Jacobs unopposed and removing the race from the ballot.

=== Polling ===
Poll source	Date(s) administered	Sample size (Note: Key: A – all adults RV – registered voters LV – likely voters CV – certain voters V – unclear)	Margin of error	Teresa Jacobs	Val Demings	Other / Undecided
SGS	February/March 2014	400 (LV)	± 4.9%	48%	33%	19%

=== Results ===
Jacobs was re-elected unopposed, and the race did not appear on the ballot.
