= Linda Stewart =

American politician

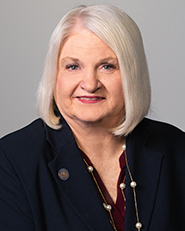

Member of the Florida Commission on Ethics
- Incumbent
- Assumed office November 9, 2024
- Nominated by: President of the Florida Senate Kathleen Passidomo

Member of the Florida Senate
- In office November 8, 2016 – November 8, 2024
- Preceded by: Andy Gardiner
- Succeeded by: Carlos Smith
- Constituency: 13th district (2016–2022); 17th district (2022–2024)

Member of the Florida House of Representatives from the 47th district
- In office November 6, 2012 – November 8, 2016
- Preceded by: Scott Randolph (redistricting)
- Succeeded by: Mike Miller

Member of the Orange County Commission
- In office November 3, 2002 – November 8, 2010
- Preceded by: Clarence Hoenstine
- Succeeded by: Jennifer Thompson
- Constituency: 3rd District

Personal details
- Born: November 23, 1948 (age 77) Johnstown, Pennsylvania, U.S.
- Party: Democratic
- Spouse: Jerry B. Stewart
- Children: Sam, Amanda, Courtney
- Education: Valencia Community College (AA)

Linda T. Stewart (born November 23, 1948) is a Democratic politician who served as a member of the Florida Senate from 2016 through 2024, representing Orange County. She previously served two terms in the Florida House of Representatives, representing central Orange County from 2012 to 2016. Since november 9, 2024, she has served as a member of the Florida Commission on Ethics.

== History ==
Stewart was born in Johnstown, Pennsylvania, and moved to Florida in 1950. She attended Valencia Community College and later pursued European independent studies abroad. In 1998, Stewart unsuccessfully ran for the Orange County Commission against incumbent Commissioner Clarence Hoenstine and Mary Wilson, Juan R. Bruno, and Anthony Rizzuto, receiving 21% of the vote. Stewart ran against Hoenstine again in 2002, and defeated him in a one-on-one contest with 51% of the vote. She was elected to a second and final term on the Commission against Jennifer Thompson, JP Quinones, and Martin Collins in 2006, again receiving 51% of the vote. Following Rich Crotty's inability to run for another term as Mayor of Orange County, Stewart ran to succeed him in 2010. In a crowded four candidate race that included Matthew Falconer and fellow Commissioners Teresa Jacobs and Bill Segal, Stewart placed third with 19% of the vote, losing to Jacobs and Segal and failing to qualify for the runoff election, which Jacobs would later win in a landslide.

== Florida House of Representatives ==
When Florida House of Representatives districts were reconfigured in 2012 and incumbent State Representative Scott Randolph decided to seek the Chairmanship of the Florida Democratic Party rather than seek re-election, Stewart ran to succeed him. She was unopposed in the Democratic primary, and faced former State Representative Bob Brooks, the Republican nominee, in the general election. A contentious general election ensued, with Stewart attacking "Brooks' support for school vouchers and his conservative social politics, saying he's too far right for a district trending Democratic." The Orlando Sentinel endorsed Stewart over Brooks, praising her for the fact that she "distinguished herself for her leadership on two critical issues for Central Florida, growth management and diversifying the region's economy." Ultimately, Stewart narrowly defeated Brooks, winning with 52% of the vote, and was sworn in later that year to her first term.

== Florida Senate ==
Stewart ran for the Florida Senate in 2016 after court-ordered redistricting made the 13th district more Democratic-leaning. She defeated former state representative Mike Clelland in the Democratic primary and Republican Dean Asher in the general election, 58 to 42%. In 2022, Stewart stated that the repeal effort of Reedy Creek Improvement Act doesn't make sense and predicted that it is an issue that won't be "very successful".
