= Mike Miller (Florida politician) =

American politician (born 1968)

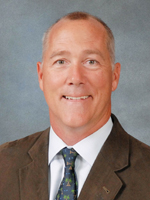
- Official portrait, 2014

Member of the Florida House of Representatives from the 47th district
- In office November 4, 2014 – November 6, 2018
- Preceded by: Linda Stewart
- Succeeded by: Anna Eskamani

Personal details
- Born: May 18, 1968 (age 58) Washington, D.C., U.S.
- Party: Republican
- Spouse: Nora
- Children: 2
- Education: University of Florida (BA); Rollins College (MBA)

Michael Joseph Miller (born May 18, 1968) is an American Republican politician from Florida. He served two terms in the Florida House of Representatives, representing the 47th District, which includes Belle Isle, Edgewood, Orlando, and Winter Park in central Orange County, from 2014 to 2018.

He was the Republican nominee for Florida's 7th congressional district in the 2018 election, and lost to incumbent Democrat Stephanie Murphy.

== Early life and career ==
Miller was born in Washington, D.C., and later moved to Florida, attending the University of Florida on a baseball scholarship. After graduating from college, he worked for Senator Connie Mack III and Representative Ric Keller. He worked on Bill McCollum's 2004 United States Senate campaign, which was ultimately unsuccessful, as his finance director. After leaving the McCollum campaign, Miller worked as a consultant in business development. While working as a consultant, he attended Rollins College, receiving his Master of Business Administration in 2008. After completing his final term in the Florida House, Mike became the Chief of External Affairs for the Florida Virtual School. Currently, Mike is the Vice President of External Affairs at Space Florida.

== Florida House of Representatives ==
In 2014, Miller announced his intention to challenge the incumbent HD47 State Representative Linda Stewart, a heavily favored Democrat. Facing environmental consultant Mo Pearson in the Republican primary, Miller prevailed with 74% of the vote and went on to beat Democrat Linda Stewart. During his first term in the Florida House of Representatives Miller worked across the aisle to pass bills to combat veteran homelessness and cosponsored legislation to address the human trafficking crisis. In 2015, Miller was assigned to the House Ways and Means committee.

In 2016 Miller was not challenged by a primary opponent and faced Democrat Beth Turra in the general election. In a district that Hillary Clinton won by 12 percent, Miller was able to retain his seat.

== Electoral history ==
Florida's 7th Congressional District Election (2018)
Party	Candidate	Votes	%
Democratic	Stephanie Murphy (Incumbent)	183,113	57.7
Republican	Mike Miller	134,285	42.3
Total votes		317,398	100.00

2016 General Election for Florida's 47th District House of Representatives
Party	Candidate	Votes	%
Republican	Mike Miller	45,639	52.94
Democratic	Beth Tuura	40,573	47.06
Total votes		86,212	100

2014 General Election for Florida's 47th District House of Representatives
Party	Candidate	Votes	%
Republican	Mike Miller	30,303	51.94
Democratic	Linda Stewart	28,039	48.06
Total votes		58,342	100
