= Anthony Suarez =

Anthony or Tony Suarez may refer to:

- Anthony R. Suarez, New Jersey Superior Court Judge, former Mayor of Ridgefield, New Jersey
- Anthony Suarez (Florida politician), former member of the Florida House of Representatives
- Tony Suarez, former soccer player
