= Jim Kallinger =

American politician (born 1960)

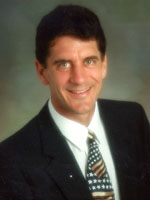

Member of the Florida House of Representatives from the 35th district
- In office November 7, 2000 – November 2, 2004
- Preceded by: Anthony Suarez
- Succeeded by: Dean Cannon

Personal details
- Born: January 15, 1960 (age 66) Evanston, Illinois
- Party: Republican
- Spouse: Dana Chilton
- Children: 3
- Education: University of Vienna; Lake Forest College (B.A.)
- Occupation: General contractor

Jim Kallinger (born January 15, 1960) is a Republican politician from Florida who served as a member of the Florida House of Representatives from 2000 to 2004.

== Early life ==
Kallinger was born in Evanston, Illinois, in 1960. He graduated from Lake Forest College with his bachelor's degree in international relations in 1983, and moved to Florida in 1984, where owned and operated his own contracting business.

== Florida House of Representatives ==
In 2000, Democratic State Representative Anthony Suarez declined to seek a full term in the State House, and Kallinger ran to succeed him in the 35th district, which included most of eastern Orange County and a small portion of Seminole County. He faced Richard Krob in the Republican primary, and defeated him by a wide margin, winning 79 percent of the vote to his 21 percent. In the general election, he faced Democrat Jimmy Auffant, an attorney and former Valencia Community College trustee. Kallinger ultimately defeated Auffant, winning 55 percent of the vote to his 45 percent, and flipped control of the seat.

Kallinger ran for re-election in 2002 and was challenged by Democrat Marni Berger, a corporate executive. He defeated Berger in a landslide, winning 63 percent of the vote to her 37 percent.

== 2004 Orange County Commission campaign ==
In 2004, rather than seek re-election to the State House, Kallinger opted to run for the Orange County Commission from the 5th district, which stretched from eastern Orange County to Winter Park. In the nonpartisan primary, he ran against developer Bill Segal, attorney David Bundy, and Bob Carr Jr., the son of former mayor Bob Carr. Segal narrowly placed first in the primary, winning 37 percent of the vote, and proceeded to the general election with Kallinger, who placed second with 34 percent. In the general election, Segal narrowly defeated Kallinger, winning 53–47 percent.

== 2020 State House campaign ==
In 2020, Kallinger, who relocated to Tallahassee after leaving the legislature, ran for the State House from the 9th district. He won the Republican nomination unopposed and faced Allison Tant, the former chair of the Florida Democratic Party, in the general election. He lost to Sant in a landslide, receiving 42 percent of the vote to her 58 percent.
