= Robert Schenck =

Robert Schenck may refer to:

- Robert C. Schenck (1809–1890), American Civil War general and politician
- Robert C. Schenck (politician) (born 1975), Republican member of the Florida House of Representatives
- Rob Schenck (Robert Leonard Schenck, born 1958), American pastor and former anti-abortion activist
