= Jeff Stabins =

American politician (1959–2020)

Member of the Florida House of Representatives from the 44th district
- In office November 3, 1992 – November 3, 1998
- Preceded by: Joe Viscusi
- Succeeded by: Dave Russell

Personal details
- Born: December 16, 1959 Watertown, New York
- Died: March 15, 2020 (aged 60) Spring Hill, Florida
- Party: Republican

Louis Jeffrey Stabins (December 16, 1959 – March 15, 2020) was an American politician who served in the Florida House of Representatives from the 44th district from 1992 to 1998.

He died on March 15, 2020, in Spring Hill, Florida at age 60.
