= Dean Cannon =

American politician

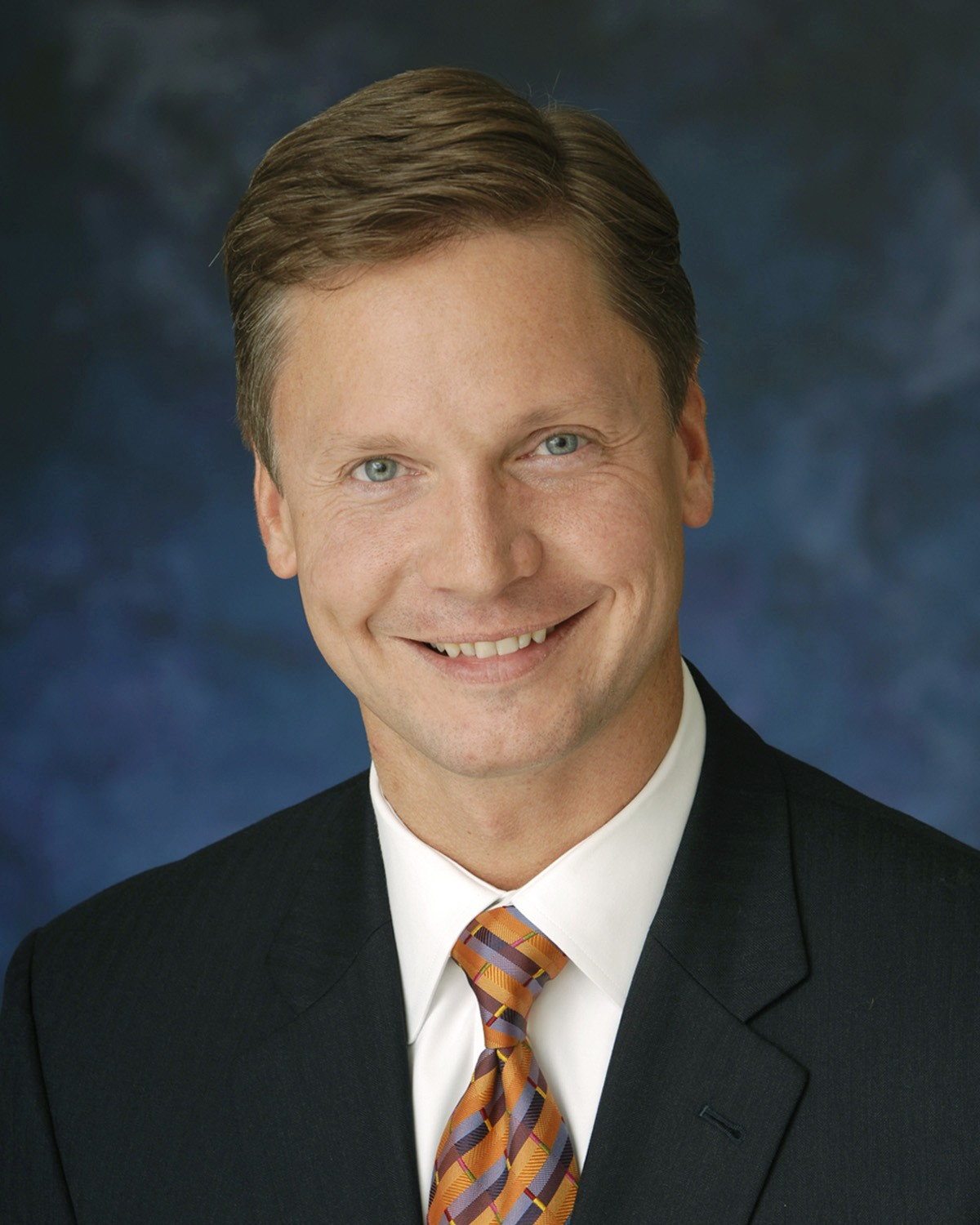
- Official portrait, 2007

97th Speaker of the Florida House of Representatives
- In office November 16, 2010 – November 20, 2012
- Preceded by: Larry Cretul
- Succeeded by: Will Weatherford

Member of the Florida House of Representatives from the 35th district
- In office November 2, 2004 – November 7, 2012
- Preceded by: Jim Kallinger
- Succeeded by: Robert C. Schenck

Personal details
- Born: August 2, 1968 (age 58) Bitburg Air Base, Germany
- Party: Republican
- Spouse: Ellen Friedley
- Profession: Attorney

Dean Cannon (born August 2, 1968) is an attorney and government affairs consultant. Cannon served in the House of Representatives of the Florida Legislature from 2004 to 2012, serving as Speaker of the House from 2010 to 2012. Cannon currently serves as president and chief executive officer of 250+ attorney/consultant legal and lobbying firm, GrayRobinson, P.A.

Cannon received both his bachelor's degree and Juris Doctor from the University of Florida. While there, Cannon served as student body president and vice president of Florida Blue Key. A fifth-generation Floridian, Cannon began his career as a lawyer in Orlando, practicing state and local government law beginning in 1995.

During his eight-year tenure at the Florida House of Representatives, Cannon addressed property tax reform, growth management reform, health care and Medicaid reform, and transportation infrastructure policy initiatives. He was selected by his peers to become Speaker of the House for the 2010 to 2012 term.

Following his time in office, Cannon opened lobbying firm Capitol Insight, which then merged with GrayRobinson in 2016.

In addition to serving as president and managing director of GrayRobinson, Cannon serves on the board of directors for the Orlando Economic Partnership, Enterprise Florida, and Space Florida.

Cannon currently resides in Tallahassee, Florida, with his family.

Florida House of Representatives
Preceded by Jim Kallinger	Member of the Florida House of Representatives from the 35th district 2004–2012	Succeeded by Robert C. Schenck
Political offices
Preceded by Larry Cretul	Speaker of the Florida House of Representatives; 2010–2012	Succeeded by Will Weatherford
