= Bob Brooks (Florida politician) =

American politician (born 1953)

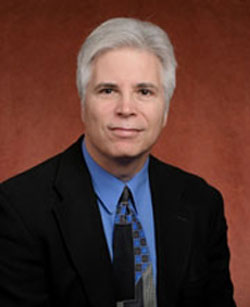

Member of the Florida House of Representatives from the 35th district
- In office November 8, 1994 – January 15, 1999
- Preceded by: Tom Feeney
- Succeeded by: Anthony Suarez

Personal details
- Born: November 8, 1953 (age 72) Detroit, Michigan
- Party: Republican
- Children: 3
- Education: Wayne State University (B.A., M.D.); Harvard School of Public Health (M.P.H.); Auburn University (M.B.A.); Reformed Theological Seminary (M.A.)
- Occupation: Physician

Robert Brooks (born November 8, 1953) is a physician and Republican politician from Florida who served as a member of the Florida House of Representatives from the 35th district from 1994 to 1999. He subsequently served as the Secretary of the Florida Department of Health from 1999 to 2001 and an administrator at the Florida State University College of Medicine and the University of South Florida.

== Early life ==
Brooks was born in Detroit in 1953, and attended Wayne State University, graduating with his bachelor's degree in 1975 and his medical degree in 1979. He completed his residency at Hutzel Women's Hospital and Sinai Hospital in Detroit from 1979 to 1982, and then a fellowship in infectious diseases at Stanford from 1982 to 1984. Brooks moved to Florida in 1984 and settled in Longwood, where he practiced medicine at the Orlando Regional Medical Center and served as the chief of infectious diseases.

== Florida House of Representatives ==
State Representative Tom Feeney opted to run for Lieutenant Governor in 1994 on a ticket with Jeb Bush rather than seek re-election, and Brooks ran to succeed him in the Orange County-based 35th district. In the Republican primary, he faced insurance agent Rick Patterson and financial planner Frank Arnall, the brother of State Representative Joe Arnall. Brooks won the primary by a wide margin, receiving 57 percent of the vote to Arnall's 22 percent and Patterson's 20 percent. In the general election, Brooks was opposed by Democrat Susan Pickman, the owner of a travel agency. He ultimately defeated Pickman, winning 54 percent of the vote to her 46 percent.

During his first term in the legislature, Brooks authored a letter to the Walt Disney Company, which several other legislators joined, criticizing Disney's decision to provide health benefits to gay and lesbian employees' domestic partners. The letter described Disney's policy as supporting "a lifestyle that is unhealthy, unnatural and unworthy of special treatment." The Florida Commission on Ethics dismissed a complaint that was filed against Brooks and the other legislators, concluding that legislators were permitted "to solicit public support for matters which the official feels to be in the public interest."

Brooks ran for re-election in 1996, and was challenged by Democrat Kent Cooper, a businessman who criticized Brooks's authorship of the letter. The Orlando Sentinel praised Cooper's potential, but ultimately endorsed Brooks, despite criticizing his "social-agenda preoccupation." Brooks defeated Cooper by a wide margin, winning his second term with 60 percent of the vote. He was unopposed for re-election in 1998.

== Post-legislative career ==
Shortly after Brooks was re-elected in 1998, Governor-elect Jeb Bush announced that he would appoint him to be Secretary of the Florida Department of Health, and Brooks resigned from the legislature. He served until 2001, when he resigned to join the faculty of the Florida State University College of Medicine as associate dean for health affairs. Brooks moved to the University of South Florida in 2009, where he was named the associate vice president for health leadership at USF Health.

In 2012, following redistricting, Brooks announced that he would run for the Florida House of Representatives from the newly created 47th district, which included much of the territory he had previously represented. He won the Republican nomination unopposed and faced former Orange County Commissioner Linda Stewart in the general election. Stewart narrowly defeated Brooks, winning the election with 52 percent of the vote to his 48 percent.
