= Dave Russell (Florida politician) =

American politician (born 1955)

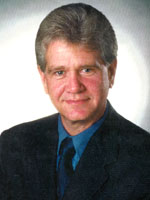

Member of the Florida House of Representatives from the 44th district
- In office November 3, 1998 – November 7, 2006
- Preceded by: Jeff Stabins
- Succeeded by: Rob Schenck

Personal details
- Born: June 18, 1955 (age 71) Birmingham, Alabama
- Party: Republican
- Spouse: Michele Marie Vann
- Children: 2
- Occupation: Swimming pool contractor

David D. Russell Jr. (born June 18, 1955) is a Republican politician from Florida who served as a member of the Florida House of Representatives from the 44th district from 1998 to 2006 and on the Hernando County Commission from 2006 to 2014.

== Early life ==
Russell was born in Birmingham, Alabama, in 1955, and moved to Florida in 1971. He originally lived in Jacksonville and moved to Spring Hill in 1982. His father, David Russell Sr., served as a member of the Hernando County Commission from 1986 to 1988. Russell owned and operated Russell's Pool Center, a pool service company, and served as chairman of the Hernando Aviation Authority.

== Florida House of Representatives ==
In 1998, Russell ran for the Florida House of Representatives from the 44th district, challenging incumbent Representative Jeff Stabins in the Republican primary. Russell campaigned on his background as a businessman, and argued that Stabins had been ineffective in the state legislature. Russell narrowly defeated Stabins, winning 52 percent of the vote to his 48 percent. He was unopposed in the general election.

Russell ran for re-election in 2000, and was challenged in the Republican primary by attorney Sabato DeVito and engineer Nick Nicholson. DeVito argued that the legislative session had gone poorly, and attacked Russell for sponsoring legislation allowing motorcyclists to ride motorcycles without a helmet if they had an insurance policy of at least $10,000. Russell won renomination by a wide margin, receiving 60 percent of the vote to Nicholson's 24 percent and DeVito's 16 percent. In the general election, Russell faced Democratic nominee Gregory Williams, a correctional officer. Russell defeated Williams to win a second term, receiving 55 percent of the vote to Williams's 45 percent.

In 2002, Russell sought a third term, and was challenged by Williams again, as well as Libertarian Edward Pittman. He defeated both by a wider margin than two years prior, winning 58 percent of the vote to Williams's 39 percent and Pittman's 3 percent.

Russell ran for a fourth term in 2004, and was challenged by veterinarian Jim Hughes, the Democratic nominee. Though Hughes argued that Russell was "controlled by special interests," he faced controversy for accusations of domestic violence and a past criminal conviction. Russell won re-election in a landslide, receiving 60 percent of the vote to Hughes's 40 percent.

== Hernando County Commission ==
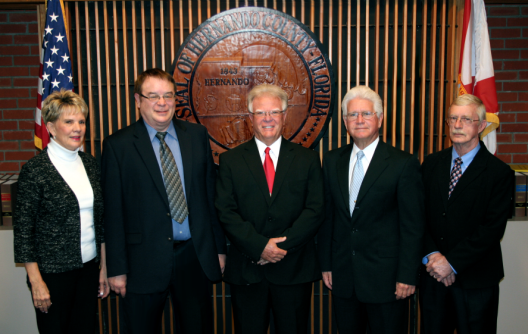
Russell (second from right) in 2014 with other members of the Hernando County Commission

In 2006, because of term limits, Russell was unable to seek re-election to a fifth term. Instead, he ran for a seat on the Hernando County Commission from the 4th district, seeking to succeed Commissioner Rob Schenck, who was running for Russell's seat in the State House. He won the Republican nomination unopposed and faced Democrat Jamie Wrye in the general election. Russell defeated Wrye in the general election.

Russell was re-elected unopposed in 2010, and declined to run for re-election in 2014.

In 2016, Russell announced that he would seek another term on the County Commission, and ran to succeed Commissioner Jim Adkins in the 5th district. He faced businessman Steve Champion in the Republican primary, who attacked Russell for living outside of the district. Russell ultimately lost to Champion, receiving 46 percent of the vote to his 54 percent.
