= Robert C. Schenck (politician) =

American politician

Robert C. "Rob" Schenck
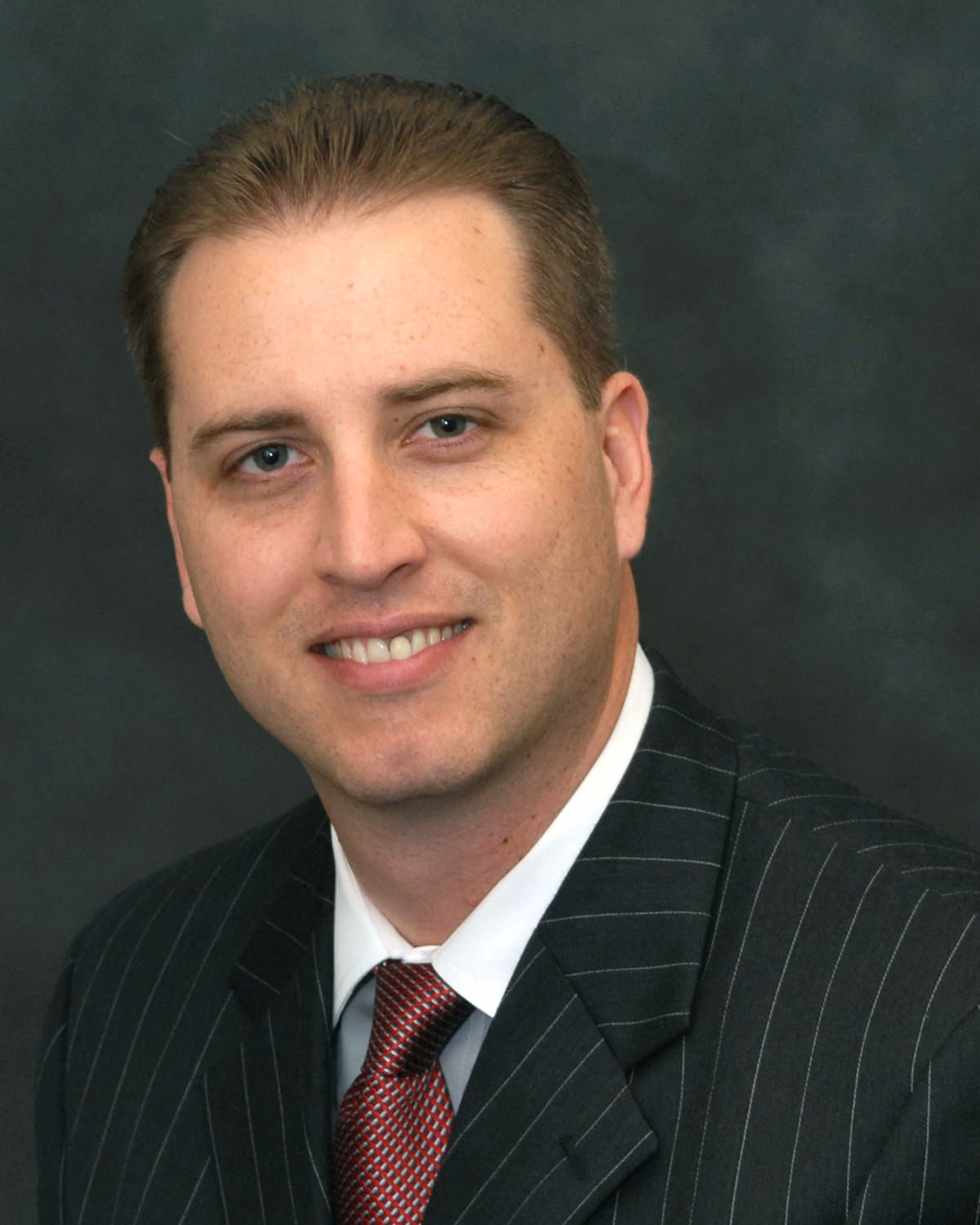

Member of the Florida House of Representatives from the 35th district
- In office November 20, 2012 – November 18, 2014
- Preceded by: Dean Cannon
- Succeeded by: Blaise Ingoglia

Member of the Florida House of Representatives from the 44th district
- In office November 21, 2006 – November 20, 2012
- Preceded by: Dave Russell
- Succeeded by: Steve Precourt

Personal details
- Born: July 8, 1975 (age 51) Somerville, New Jersey
- Party: Republican
- Education: Pasco-Hernando Community College (A.A.); University of Central Florida (B.S.)
- Profession: Teacher

Rob Schenck (born July 8, 1975) is a Republican member of the Florida House of Representatives from 2006 to 2014, representing the 44th District from 2006 to 2012 and the 35th District, which included Spring Hill and Brooksville in Hernando County, from 2012 to 2014.

== History ==
Schenck was born in Somerville, New Jersey, and moved to the state of Florida in 1980, where he attended Central High School. He graduated from Pasco-Hernando Community College, now known as Pasco-Hernando State College in 1995 and from the University of Central Florida in 1998. Following graduation, Schenck returned to Central High School, where he taught social studies before running for the Hernando County Commission in 2002, defeating incumbent Commissioner Chris Kinglsey. Schenck resigned from the Commission in July 2006 so that he could focus on his campaign for the State House of Representatives.

In September 2014, Representative Schenck was cited for his involvement in an automobile accident, however adjudication was withheld at trial.

== Florida House of Representatives ==
When incumbent State Representative Dave Russell was unable to seek another term in the legislature in 2006, Schenck ran to succeed him and resigned his position as County Commissioner. In the Republican primary, he defeated Joseph Mattingly by a comfortable margin, winning with 58% of the vote. In the general election, he faced Glenn Claytor, the Democratic nominee and a retired developer. Claytor, who was forty years older than Schenck, attacked him for his youth and inexperience, noting that, "It isn't just the age disparity. It's life experience," which Schenck responded by observing that he had held elected office previously while Claytor had not. Owing to the contentious nature of the campaign, Schenck eked out a narrow win over Clayor, defeating him with 51% of the vote and by about a thousand votes. In 2008, Schenck was initially going to face Joseph Puglia, the highly touted Democratic nominee, but Puglia withdrew from the race in September, citing his wife's deteriorating health. Puglia was quickly replaced by Jason Melton, the President of the Hernando County Bar Association, though Puglia's name remained on the ballot. Schenck managed to with re-election comfortably over Melton and Green Party candidate Sarah Roman, winning 53% of the vote to Melton's 41% and Roman's 6%. During his campaign for a third term in the legislature, he faced former Hernando County Commissioner Diane Rowden, whom he attacked for living outside the district, though she purchased a house in the district during the campaign, and for "raising our taxes and over-regulating our small businesses." Schenck defeated Rowden in the general election, winning more than 60% of the vote.

When the legislative districts were redrawn in 2012, Schenck was moved to the 35th District, which contained most of the territory that he had previously represented in the 44th District. He was challenged in the general election by another former County Commissioner, Rose Rocco, who was endorsed by the Tampa Bay Times, but ultimately turned her challenge away, winning election to his final term in the legislature with 56% of the vote. As his fourth term drew to a close, Schenck, though he was mentioned as a potential candidate to replace retiring County Commissioner Dave Russell, exited elected politics.
