= 2010 Orange County, Florida mayoral election =

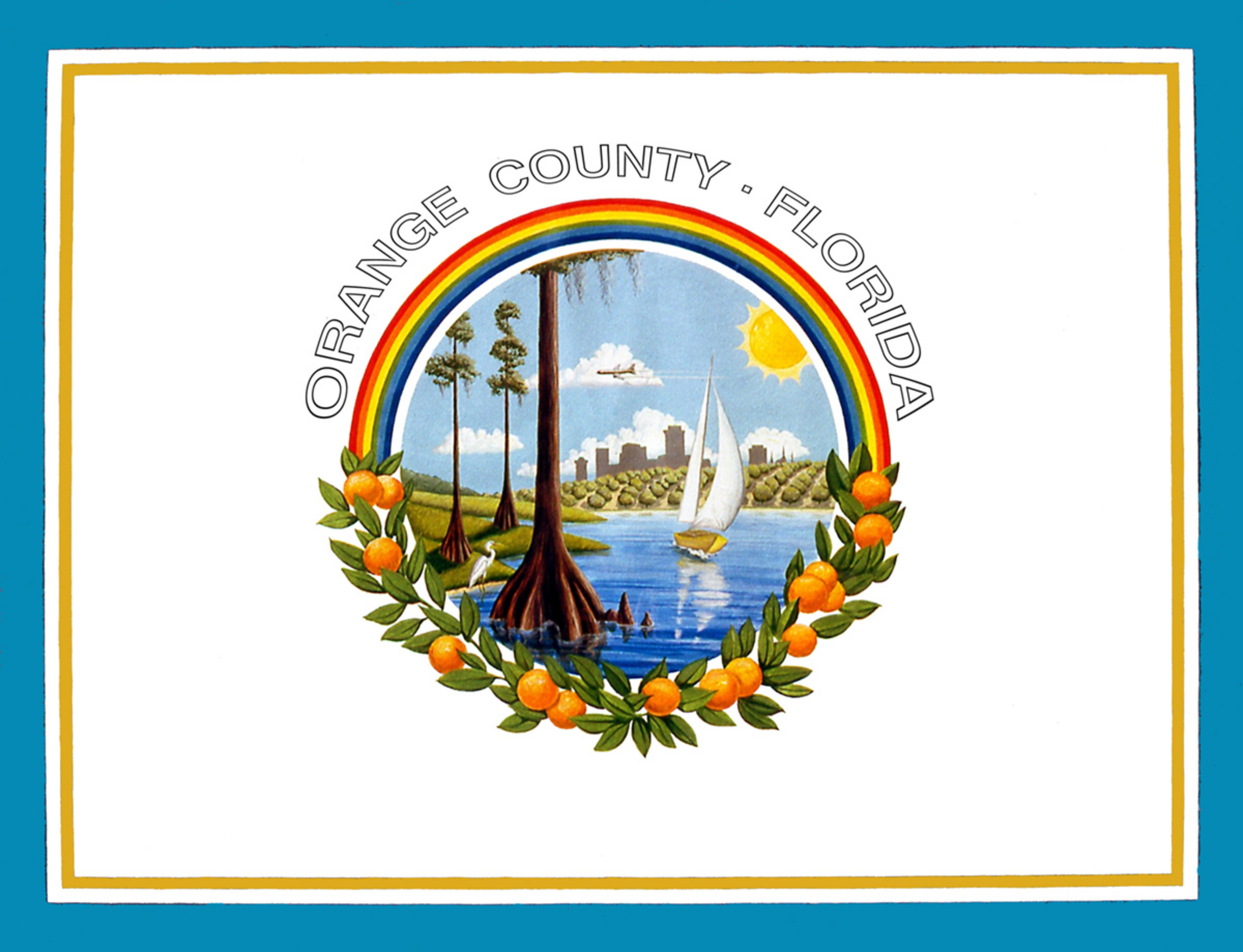
- August 24, 2010; November 2, 2010
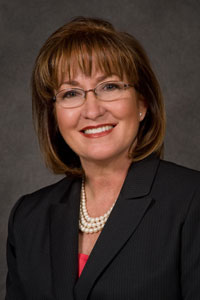

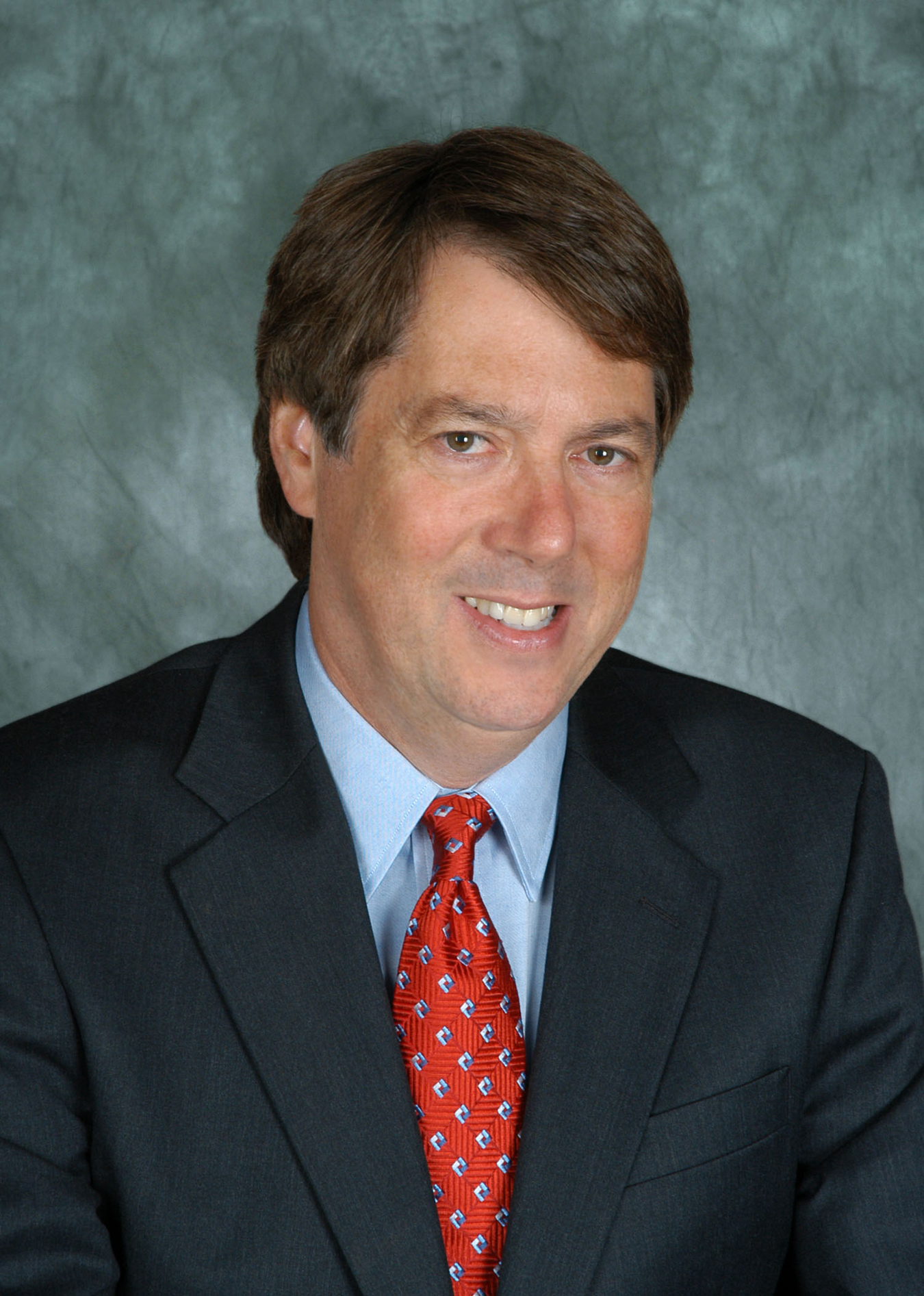

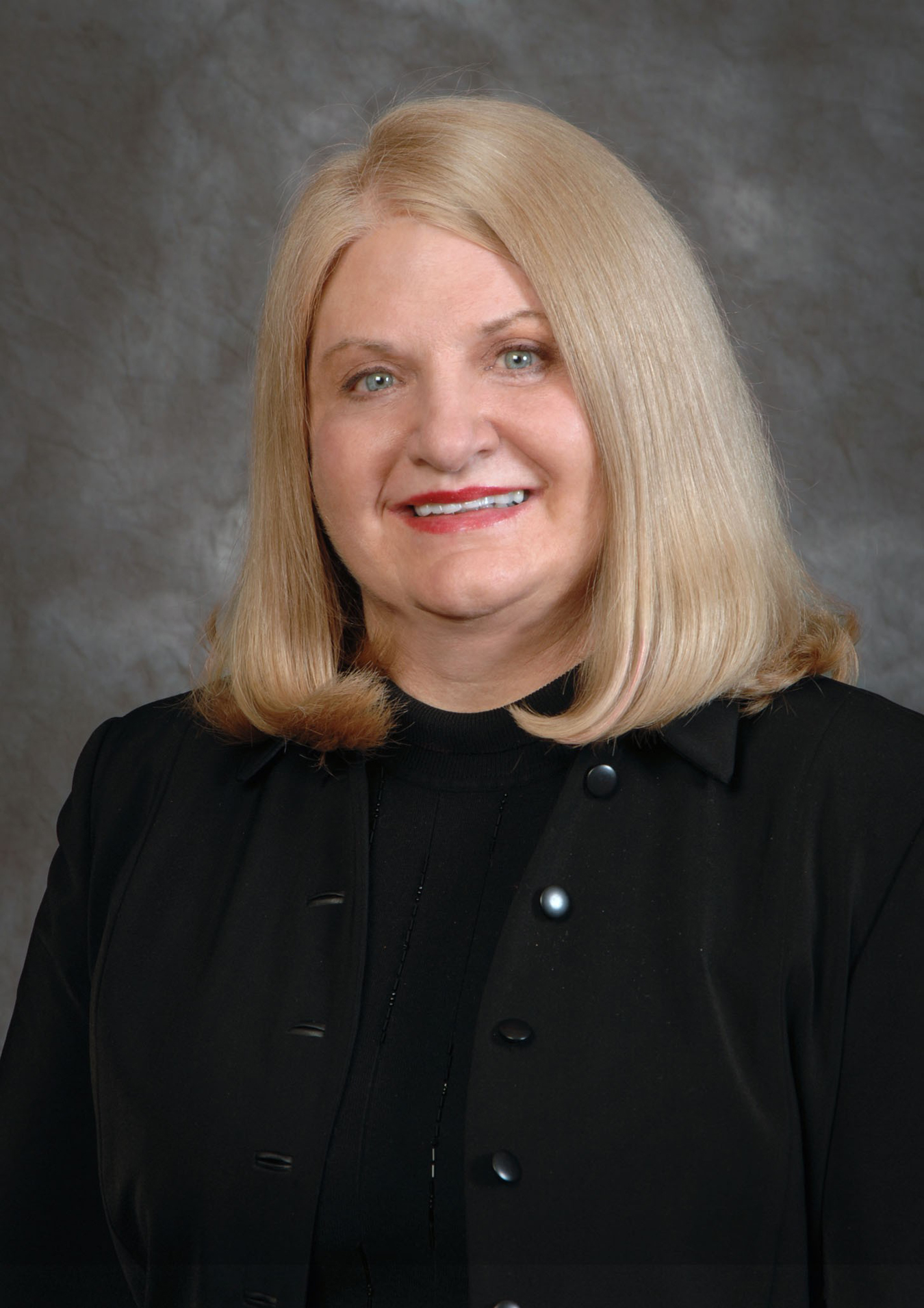

| Candidate | Teresa Jacobs | Bill Segal |
| First round | 53,073; 42.30% | 28,765; 22.92% |
| Runoff | 164,480; 67.66% | 78,611; 32.34% |
| Candidate | Linda Stewart | Matthew Falconer |
| First round | 24,091; 19.20% | 18,802; 14.98% |
| Runoff | Eliminated | Eliminated |
Mayor before election
Rich Crotty
Nonpartisan
Elected mayor
Teresa Jacobs
Nonpartisan

The 2010 Orange County, Florida, mayoral election took place on November 2, 2010. Incumbent Republican mayor Richard Crotty was unable to seek re-election due to term limits, and four candidates ran to replace him. A nonpartisan primary election was held on August 24, 2010, but because no candidate won a majority of the vote, former county commissioner Teresa Jacobs, a Republican, advanced to a runoff election against fellow county commissioner Bill Segal, a Democrat. Following a contentious general election, Jacobs was elected mayor over Segal in a landslide, winning her first term 68–32.

== Primary election ==
=== Candidates ===
- Teresa Jacobs, former County Commissioner (Republican)
- Bill Segal, County Commissioner (Democratic)
- Linda Stewart, County Commissioner (Democratic)
- Matthew Falconer, businessman (Republican)

==== Dropped out ====
- Mildred Fernández, County Commissioner

=== Campaign ===
The race to succeed term-limited mayor Richard Crotty, a Republican, initially included incumbent county commissioners Mildred Fernández, Bill Segal, and Linda Stewart, former county commissioner Teresa Jacobs, and businessman Matthew Falconer. Though officially nonpartisan, Segal and Stewart were Democrats, while Falconer, Fernández, and Jacobs were Republicans.

Segal started off as the frontrunner, raising vastly more money than his opponents combined, benefiting from independent expenditures from a business-affiliated campaign group, and winning support from much of the county's political establishment. He emphasized his business experience and campaigned on a plan to create jobs by providing employment incentives to businesses. Segal was criticized by his opponents, however, for his pro-development policies. He also came under scrutiny for attending private, men-only meetings with lobbyists and developers, and for voting for county projects that benefited his business partner financially. Segal, however, compared the meetings to other routine events that he regularly attended, and said that he "never made a dime" on his votes.

Though Stewart raised little money, she launched an "aggressive" and "progressive campaign," focusing on her support for environmental causes, improving public transportation, LGBT rights, and ethics reform. She campaigned on her strong support for SunRail and other transportation projects, which she would've funded through a rental car surcharge and a half-cent sales tax increase, though she called for rolling back a 25-cent toll increase. Stewart was criticized for supporting tax increases and her inability to run the county, with Segal arguing that she didn't have the "savvy," "worldliness," or the "management ability" to lead the county.

Falconer, meanwhile, positioned himself as the Tea Party candidate, and campaigned on his support for slashing the size of county government and his opposition to infrastructure projects like SunRail.

Fernández campaigned on a fiscally conservative platform, arguing for tax cuts, a reduction in the size of government, and strong ethics reform. However, on April 27, 2010, following an undercover sting she was arrested on charges of "bribery, grand theft, and accepting illegal campaign contributions." Segal's campaign manager, Eric Foglesong, had spoken with State Attorney Lawson Lamar's office about Fernández, and was listed as a "confidential source" in court records. Fernández claimed that "special interests" had conspired to launch a "brutal character assassination" against her, and her lawyer accused Segal of coordinating the arrest. Fernández dropped out of the race and was suspended as county commissioner by then-governor Charlie Crist, and she would later resign on November 15, 2011, as part of a plea deal.

Finally, Jacobs focused on ending the "good ol' boy network" that she said had long run Orange County and scared off businesses looking to relocate to the region. She emphasized her support for ethics reform and said that she would build the Wekiva Parkway by "renegotiat[ing] bond deals, reprioritiz[ing] current road projects, and look[ing] for private partners to complete the project."

Though it did not make an endorsement in the race, the Florida Democratic Party campaigned against Jacobs, attacking her for being a "lobbyist" and for "spen[ding] her career working against us for special interests" and linked her to former president George W. Bush and former Alaska Governor Sarah Palin. Jacobs argued that the Party repeated Segal's "false accusations," and that she had "never been a lobbyist."

The Orlando Sentinel endorsed Jacobs, praising her as "[c]reative and courageous, with a budget director's mind and an environmentalist's heart." The Sentinel criticized Segal for his disregard for unbridled development and lack of transparency, and noted that if he won, Falconer would be a "detriment to the county and the region" and would make Orange County "a bleak place." Though it praised Stewart's positions, the Sentinel argued that "Jacobs would champion them more forcefully," and that Stewart was "more advocate than administrator."

=== Endorsements ===
Teresa Jacobs

Newspapers

- Orlando Sentinel
Bill Segal

State legislators

- Gary Siplin, state senator (D-Orlando)
- Geraldine Thompson, state representative (D-Orlando)

Mayors and other municipal leaders

- Ken Bradley, Mayor of Winter Park
- Bill Brooks, Mayor of Belle Isle
- Buddy Dyer, Mayor of Orlando
- Samuel Ings, Orlando city commissioner
- Daisy Lynum, Orlando city commissioner
- Bruce Mount, Mayor of Eatonville

Organizations

- Central Florida Police Benevolent Association
- Orange County Professional Firefighters
Linda Stewart

Other individuals

- Doug Head, former chairman of the Orange County Democratic Party

Organizations

- Fraternal Order of Police, Lodge 86

=== Results ===
2010 Orange County, Florida, mayoral primary election
| Party | Candidate | Votes | % |
|---|---|---|---|
| Nonpartisan | Teresa Jacobs | 53,073 | 42.30% |
| Nonpartisan | Bill Segal | 28,765 | 22.92% |
| Nonpartisan | Linda Stewart | 24,091 | 19.20% |
| Nonpartisan | Matthew Falconer | 18,802 | 14.98% |
| Write-in | | 749 | 0.60% |
| Total votes | | 125,480 | 100.00% |

== General election ==
=== Campaign ===
Despite Bill Segal's frontrunner status and expectations that he would finish first in the primary, he finished a distant second, only narrowly edging out Linda Stewart.

As Jacobs and Segal advanced to the general election, the rhetoric between both campaigns became heated. Segal attacked Jacobs on ethics, for not supporting gay rights, and for making it "more difficult for minority-owned businesses to get access to county contracts." Jacobs countered that she supported an effort to expand the county's human rights ordinance, and that Segal "fought and ignored" financial disclosure and conflict-of-interest rules as County Commissioner. On racial issues, Jacobs argued that Segal misrepresented her record and pointed to her work improving quality of life in Tildenville, a small African-American community.

And despite Segal's earlier fundraising advantage over Jacobs, as the general election approached, Jacobs took a fundraising lead over Segal, and released polls showing that she maintained a sizable edge over him.

Meanwhile, Stewart refused to endorse Segal, a fellow Democrat, over Jacobs, a Republican, criticizing their "stark differences on the environment and growth policies." Stewart attacked Segal's environmental record, his pushes to "put urban development into rural settlements," and his "extremely poor judgment in attending lavish 'men-only' cocktail parties funded by lobbyists." However, she declined to endorse Jacobs, either, noting that she had "areas of disagreement" with her.

=== Results ===
2010 Orange County, Florida, mayoral general election
| Party | Candidate | Votes | % |
|---|---|---|---|
| Nonpartisan | Teresa Jacobs | 164,480 | 67.66% |
| Nonpartisan | Bill Segal | 78,611 | 32.34% |
| Total votes | | 243,091 | 100.00% |
