= Orange County Board of County Commissioners =

Governing body of Florida country

Orange County Commission
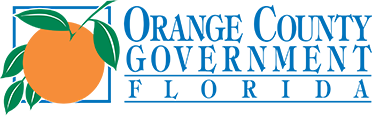

Type
- Type: County Commission
- Term limits: None

Leadership
- Chair: Mayor Jerry Demings (D) since December 4, 2018
- Vice Chair: Vice Mayor Mike Scott (D) since January 2025

Structure
- Seats: 6
- Political groups: Officially nonpartisan: Democratic (5); Republican (1)
- Length of term: 4 years

Elections
- Voting system: Two-round system
- Last election: November 5, 2024
- Next election: November 3, 2026

The Board of County Commissioners (BCC) is the county commission of Orange County, Florida. The board has seven seats: six seats for the county commissioners for each of six districts and one seat for the mayor of Orange County.

== Current board ==
=== Mayor ===
| Portrait | Name | Party | Position | Term end | Citations |
|---|---|---|---|---|---|
| | Jerry Demings | Democratic | Mayor | 2026 | |

=== County commissioners ===
| Portrait | Name | Party | District | Term end | Citations |
|---|---|---|---|---|---|
| | Nicole Wilson | Democratic | District 1 | 2028 | |
| | Christine Moore | Republican | District 2 | April 27, 2026 (Resigned) | |
| | Mayra Uribe | Democratic | District 3 | 2028 | |
| | Maribel Gomez Cordero | Democratic | District 4 | 2026 | |
| | Kelly Semrad | Democratic | District 5 | 2028 | |
| | Michael Scott | Democratic | District 6 | 2026 | |

== 2006 board election ==
The mayor and commissioners each hold four-year terms, and are limited to two full terms each. The mayor and the commissioners of the even-numbered districts are up for election during mid-term election cycles, while the commissioners of the odd-numbered districts are up for election during presidential election cycles. Elections are non-partisan, but partisan politics do tend to play a role in the elections. The elections are contested during the primary election. If a single candidate fails to get a simple majority of votes for their seat, then the top two candidates will face each other in a run-off election during the general election.

An election was held on September 5, 2006. Richard Crotty took over the position of mayor of Orange County during Mel Martinez's 1998 term (Martinez was selected as George W. Bush's secretary of housing and urban development), so he is still eligible for re-election in 2006. Both Bob Sindler and Homer Hartage were term-limited out, with Hartage running for Democratic nomination to Florida's 8th congressional district, which he lost to Charlie Stuart. Sindler, also a Democrat, was running for the 38th District of the Florida House of Representatives, but was disqualified from campaigning for the seat due to failure to adhere to resign to run rules. Not coincidentally, the man that won District 2 in the primary, Fred Brummer, a Republican, was term-limited out of the same seat Sindler considered running for, and so essentially ran as an incumbent.

Richard Crotty won the election for mayor of Orange County, with 69.69% of the vote. Sally Baptiste was his only opponent.

Fred Brummer, previously representing the overlapping 38th District in the Florida House of Representatives, won District 2 with 53.61% of the vote. Lawrence Kolin was second, with 20.23% of the vote. Two others ran for the seat.

Linda Stewart successfully defended her seat, winning a second term for District 4 with 51.46% of the vote. Jennifer Thompson was second, with 31.45% of the vote. Two others ran for the seat.

The race for District 6 was hotly contested, and ended in a virtual dead heat in the primary, with Tiffany Moore and Bruce Antone getting 37.92% and 37.46% of the vote, respectively. E.Juan Lynum, the son of Orlando city commissioner Daisy Lynum, was third in a field of five. Tiffany Moore ultimately won the election at the general election, defeating Bruce Antone by a 53%-47% margin.

== 2008 board elections ==
In District 1, where Teresa Jacobs could not run again due to term limits, S. Scott Boyd and Sharon Gravitte finished in a near dead heat, 35.31% to 33.81% respectively, in the 2008-08-26, primary election. In a runoff held during the general election on November 4, Boyd won the election with 55% of the vote.

In District 3, Mildred Fernandez successfully defended her seat in a one-on-one election between her and challenger John Kelly Harris in the general election on November 4. She received 56.75% of the vote.

In District 5, Bill Segal ran unopposed, and retained his seat

== 2014 board elections ==
In District 2, incumbent commissioner Fred Brummer of Apopka was term-limited out of office. State representative Bryan Nelson came with one percent of the vote to avoid a November runoff election as he finished first in the six-way primary with 49% of the vote. Eatonville vice-mayor finished in second place and advanced to the runoff with 18% of the vote, finishing a few hundred votes ahead of corrections officer Patricia Rumph, who finished third. Two other candidates, Prince Brown and Greg Jackson finished with a combined 15% of the vote.

In District 4, incumbent Jennifer Thompson ran for re-election with opposition from union representative Euri Cerrud and homemaker Maribel Cordero. She easily beat out both, winning outright with 65% of the vote.

In District 6, incumbent commissioner Tiffany Moore Russell was term-limited and entered the race for the Orange County clerk of courts. Businessman Derrick "Shine" Wallace and lawyer and husband of Gary Siplin, Victoria Siplin emerged from the primary with 21% and 28% of the vote respectively. They will both take part in the November runoff. Other candidates receiving votes were former Moore Russell aide Roberta Walton, Virginia Whittington, former Orange County commissioner Homer Hartage and community activist Luwanna Gelzer.

== 2024 board elections ==
=== District 1 ===
Nicole Wilson was re-elected to Orange County Board of County Commissioners, defeating businessman Austin Arthur.

2024 Orange County Board of County Commissioners District 1 election
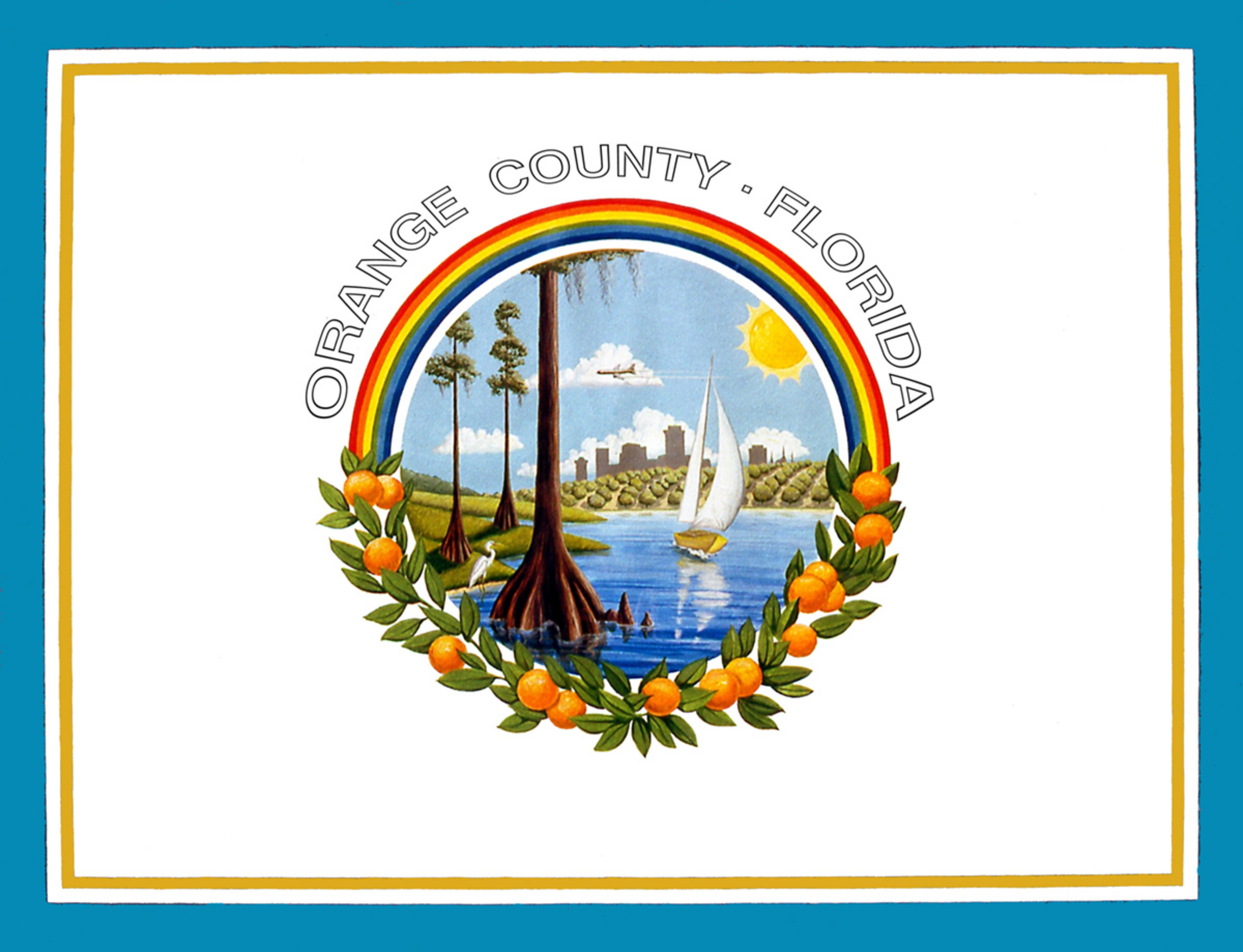
- August 20, 2024 (first round); November 5, 2024 (runoff); Officially nonpartisan

| Nominee | Nicole Wilson | Austin Arthur | Stephen Davis |
| Party | Democratic | Republican | Write-in |
| First round | 14,062; 49.98% | 14,060; 49.97% | 15; 0.05% |
| Runoff | 56,139; 52.69% | 50,398; 47.31% | Eliminated |
- First round precinct results Wilson: 50–55% 55–60% >60% Arthur: 50–55% 55–60% >60%
County commissioner before election
Nicole Wilson
Democratic
Elected county commissioner
Nicole Wilson
Democratic

=== District 3 ===
Mayra Uribe was re-elected to the Orange County Board of County Commissioners, defeating former state senator Linda Stewart.

2024 Orange County Board of County Commissioners District 3 election
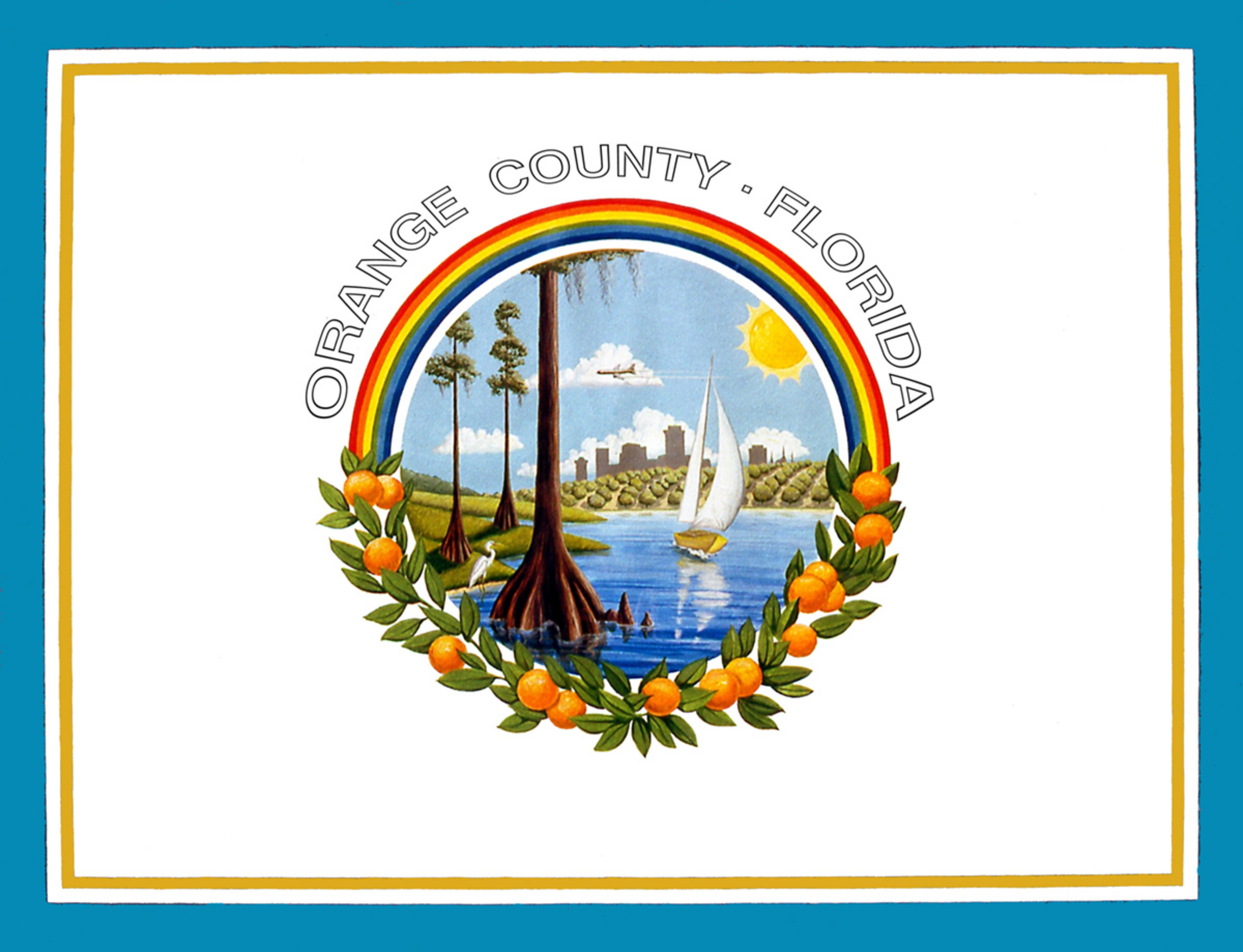
- August 20, 2024 (first round); November 5, 2024 (runoff); Officially nonpartisan

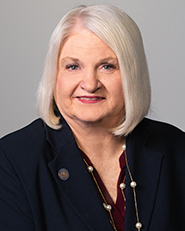

| Nominee | Mayra Uribe | Linda Stewart | Gus Martinez |
| Party | Democratic | Democratic | Republican |
| First round | 9,861; 44.7% | 7,655; 34.7% | 4,548; 20.6% |
| Runoff | 41,881; 52.8% | 37,735; 47.2% | Eliminated |
- First round precinct results Uribe: 30–40% 40–50% 50–60% Stewart: 30–40% 40–50% Martinez: 30–40%
County commissioner before election
Mayra Uribe
Democratic
Elected county commissioner
Mayra Uribe
Democratic

=== District 5 ===
Kelly Semrad was elected to the Orange County Board of County Commissioners, defeating former Winter Park mayor Steve Leary.

2024 Orange County Board of County Commissioners District 5 election
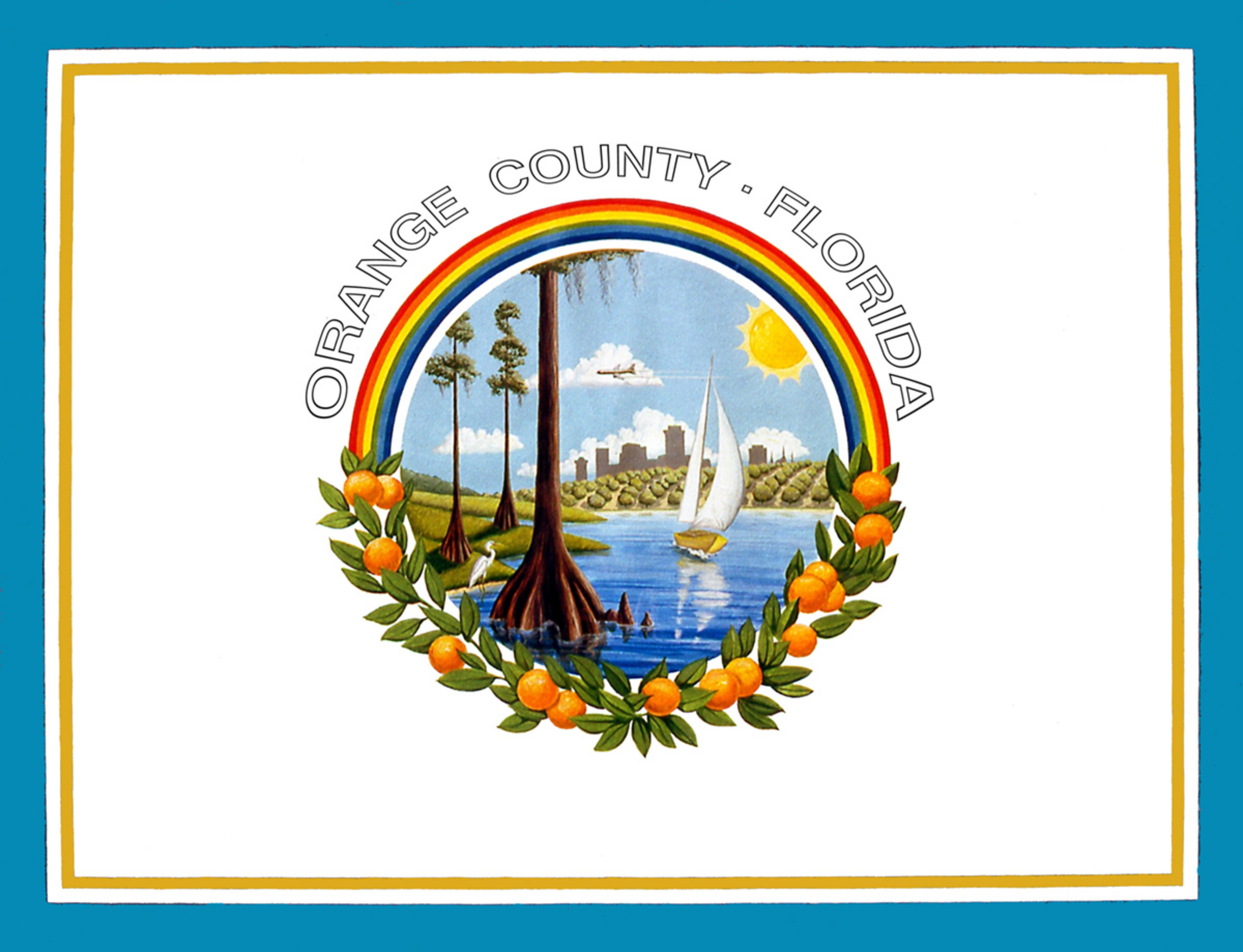
- August 20, 2024 (first round); November 5, 2024 (runoff); Officially nonpartisan

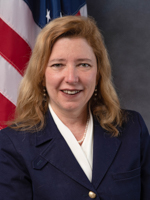

| Nominee | Kelly Semrad | Steve Leary | Joy Goff-Marcil |
| Party | Democratic | Republican | Democratic |
| First round | 12,168; 41.1% | 9,366; 31.6% | 4,596; 15.5% |
| Runoff | 53,560; 57.01% | 40,387; 42.99% | Eliminated |
| Nominee | Joel Montilla |
| Party | Republican |
| Runoff | Eliminated |
- First round precinct results Semrad: 30–40% 40–50% 50–60% 60–70% Leary: 30–40% 40–50% Semrad/Leary Tie
County commissioner before election
Emily Bonilla
Democratic
Elected county commissioner
Kelly Semrad
Democratic

== See also ==
- Teresa Jacobs
- Mayor of Orange County
- Orange County, Florida
