= Mayor of Orange County =

Political office in the United States

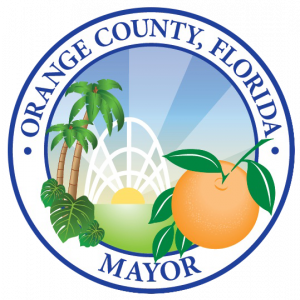
- Seal of the mayor of Orange County

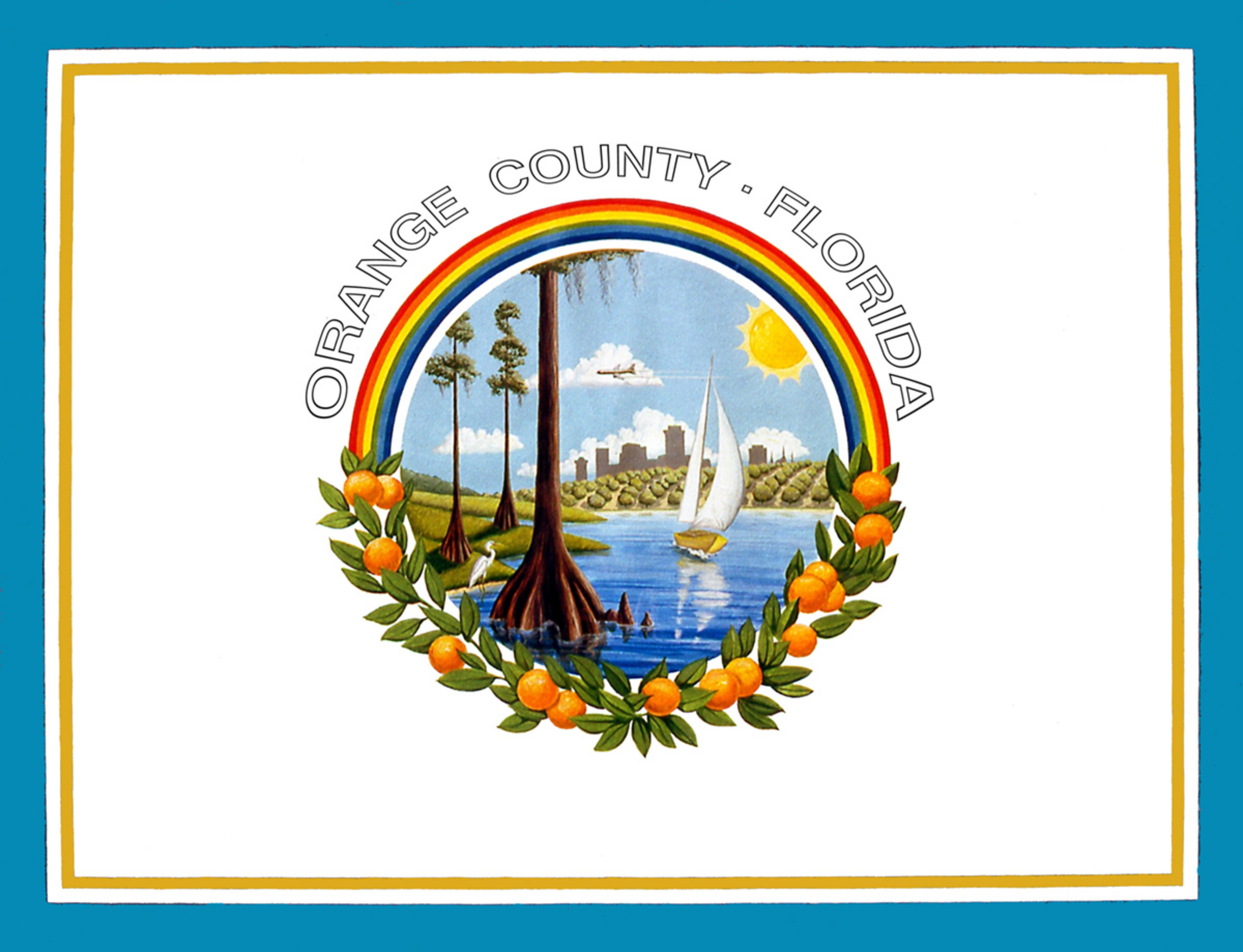
- Flag of Orange County, Florida

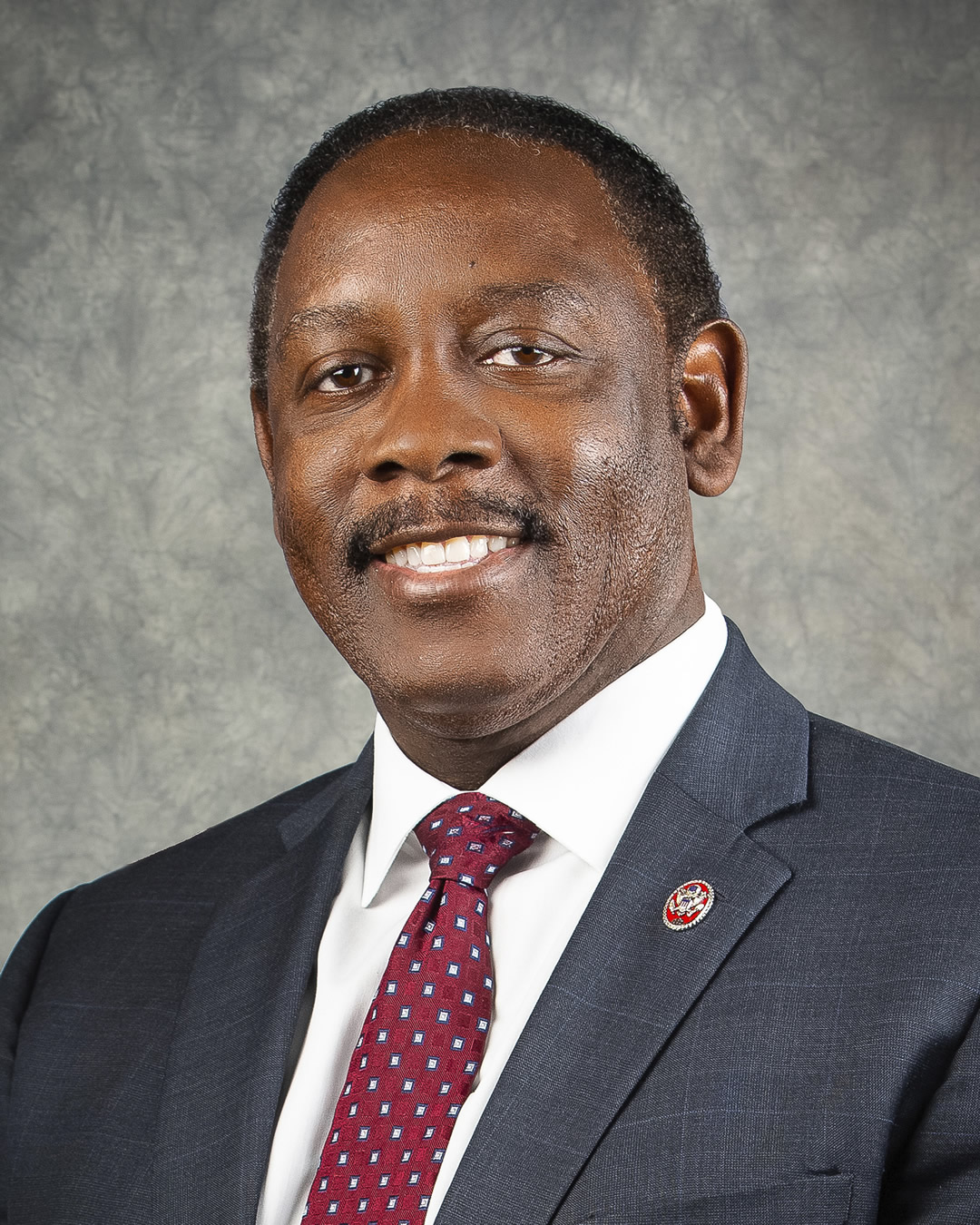
- Incumbent; Jerry Demings since December 4, 2018
- Type: Mayor
- Reports to: Board of County Commissioners
- Term length: 4 years
- Precursor: Orange County Chair
- Formation: 1990
- First holder: Linda Chapin
- Deputy: Vice Mayor

The mayor of Orange County is the county executive and chairman of the Board of County Commissioners of Orange County, Florida. The mayor is independently elected countywide.

== Duties and powers ==
The mayor is responsible for the day-to-day operations of the county government of Orange County, overseeing over 8,000 employees with a budget of over $7.2 billion, as of 2025. The mayor and county commission have municipal-equivalent authority over unincorporated areas and census-designated places within Orange County.

== History of the mayor's office ==
On April 14, 1986, the Orange County Commission formed the Orange County Citizens Charter Government Study Committee to advise on whether a home rule charter should be drafted for the county. The Committee presented its finding to the Commission in July, and on September 22, the Commission adopted the charter and submitted it to voters for their approval. Voters approved the charter on November 4, 1986. After the election, however, a voter challenged the legality of the charter's adoption, arguing that it ran afoul of a state law that required a minimum of 45 days between the adoption of a proposed charter by a county commission and its ratification by voters. The circuit court upheld the ratification of the charter, but on appeal, the Fifth District Court of Appeal reversed, holding that the charter had been unlawfully ratified.

Several weeks later, the Florida Legislature adopted legislation that retroactively modified the submission deadline for county charters, effectively nullifying the court's decision. On reconsideration, the court withdrew its ruling, but then ultimately reinstated the original ruling. The county subsequently appealed to the Supreme Court of Florida.

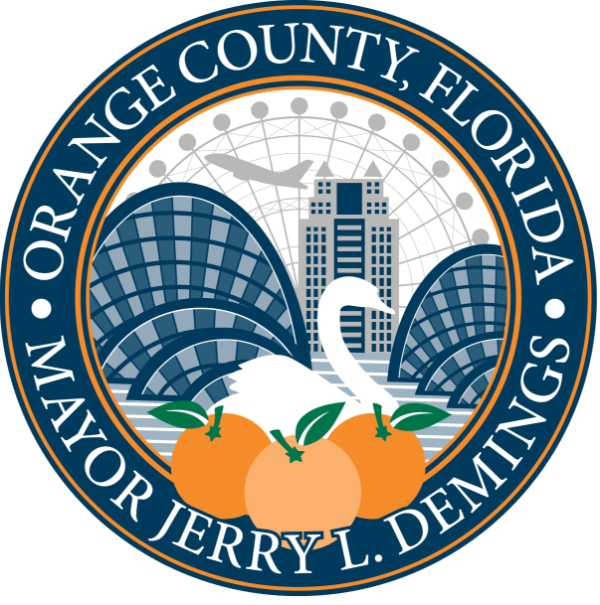
Demings' mayoral seal

As the appeal took place, county voters were presented with amendment to the 1986 charter that proposed the creation of an elected county executive, originally called the "County Chairman," which they ultimately approved. The Supreme Court ultimately upheld the validity of the 1986 charter, queueing up a 1990 election for the newly created office.

At the first election for County Chairman in 1990, County Commissioner Linda Chapin was elected. She was re-elected in 1994. Chapin was term-limited in 1998, and Mel Martínez was ultimately elected as her successor. Martínez resigned as County Chairman upon his confirmation as United States Secretary of Housing and Urban Development in 2001, and Governor Jeb Bush appointed County Property Appraiser Rich Crotty as his successor. Crotty was re-elected in 2002 and 2006. In 2004, voters approved a charter amendment that renamed the position from "Chairman" to Mayor." County Commissioner Teresa Jacobs was elected in 2010 and re-elected unopposed in 2014. In 2018, County Sheriff Jerry Demings was elected, and he was re-elected in 2022.

== List of mayors of Orange County, Florida ==
No.	Image	Mayor	Term start	Term end	Party
1		Linda Chapin	November 21, 1990	November 17, 1998	Democratic
2		Mel Martínez	November 17, 1998	January 24, 2001	Republican
3		Rich Crotty	January 24, 2001	January 4, 2011	Republican
4		Teresa Jacobs	January 4, 2011	December 4, 2018	Republican
5		Jerry Demings	December 4, 2018	Incumbent	Democratic

== See also ==
- Board of County Commissioners
- 2010 Orange County, Florida mayoral election
- 2022 Orange County, Florida mayoral election
