= Anthony Suarez (Florida politician) =

American politician

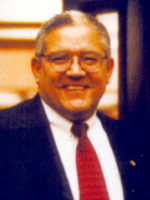

Member of the Florida House of Representatives from District 35
- In office March 9, 1999 – November 7, 2000
- Preceded by: Bob Brooks
- Succeeded by: Jim Kallinger

Personal details
- Born: October 16, 1953 (age 72) New York City, U.S.
- Party: Republican (2002–present); Democratic (before 2002)
- Children: Anthony Jr., Christian
- Education: Fordham University (B.A.); St. John's University School of Law (J.D.)
- Occupation: Attorney

Anthony "Tony" Suarez (born October 16, 1953) is a Republican politician and lawyer who served as a member of the Florida House of Representatives from 1999 to 2000.

== Education and career ==
Suarez was born in New York City and attended Fordham University, graduating with his bachelor's degree in 1974, and the St. John's University School of Law, receiving his Juris Doctor in 1977. He worked as an assistant district attorney in Bronx County after graduation, and established a law firm with Peter M. Rivera. In 1988, Suarez was appointed to the New York Judicial Commission on Minorities.

Suarez relocated to Florida in the early 1990s, and was elected the Chairman of the Seminole County Democratic Party in 1994. He was appointed by Governor Lawton Chiles to serve as a member of the Eighteenth Judicial Circuit Nominating Commission, and served as a delegate to the Guatemala peace accords.

== Florida House of Representatives ==
In 1999, Republican State Representative Bob Brooks resigned from the Florida House to serve as Secretary of the Florida Department of Health, and Governor Jeb Bush called a special election for March 9, 1999, to serve out his term. Suarez announced that he would run, and won the Democratic nomination unopposed. In the general election, Suarez faced Republican nominee Jerry Creel, the pastor of the Brush Arbor Baptist Church, who defeated former State Representative Tom Drage in the Republican primary, and Libertarian nominee Janet Hawkins.

Suarez won the general election by a narrow margin, receiving 51 percent of the vote to Creel's 46 percent and Hawkins's 3 percent, becoming the first Hispanic state legislator from Orange County.

While serving in the legislature, Suarez was the only Democrat to support Governor Bush's "One Florida" plan to end affirmative action.

== Post-legislative career ==
In 2000, rather than seek re-election to a second term, Suarez opted to run for an open seat on the Ninth Judicial Circuit, which included Orange and Osceola counties. He faced Gail Adams, a worker's compensation judge, in the nonpartisan primary election on September 5, 2000. The Orlando Sentinel endorsed Suarez, praising both candidates as "very qualified," but noting that "Suarez's broad legal experience and tireless community service give him the narrow edge." Adams ultimately defeated Suarez in a landslide, receiving 66 percent of the vote to Suarez's 34 percent.

Suarez switched to the Republican Party in 2002 as he launched a campaign for the State Senate to succeed outgoing State Senator Buddy Dyer. He faced Democratic State Representative Gary Siplin and independent Beulah Farquharson in the general election. The Sentinel endorsed Suarez over Spline, criticizing Siplin's time in the state legislature as "unimpressive" and noting that "his failure to pay longstanding personal and business debts raises troubling questions regarding his credibility and responsibility," while praising Suarez as "an independent thinker who was not afraid to break step with party bosses and vote with his conscience." Siplin narrowly defeated Suarez, winning 51 percent of the vote to Suarez's 47 percent and Farquharson's 2 percent.

In 2007, Republican State Representative John Quiñones resigned from the State House to run for a seat on the Osceola County Commission, and Suarez ran to succeed him. He won the Republican nomination unopposed and faced attorney Darren Soto, the Democratic nominee, in the April 24, 2007, general election. Soto narrowly defeated Suarez, winning 52 percent of the vote to Suarez's 48 percent.
