= Belle Isle, Florida =

City in Florida, US

- City
- City of Belle Isle
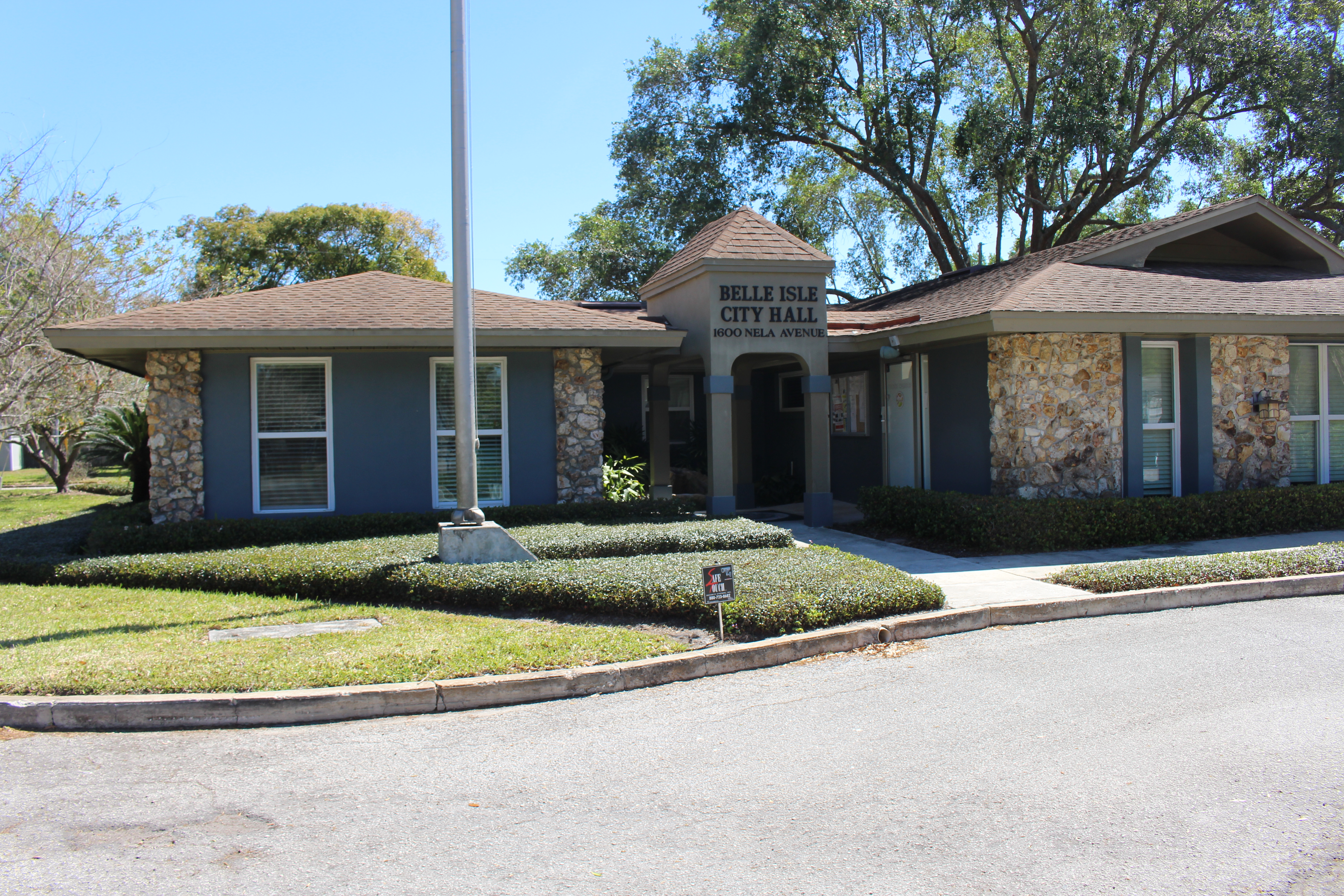
- Belle Isle City Hall

- Seal

- Location in Orange County and the state of Florida
- Coordinates: 28°28′20″N 81°20′57″W
- Country: United States
- State: Florida
- County: Orange
- Incorporated (Town): October 21, 1924
- Disnincorporated: 1928
- Reincorporated (City): 1954

Government
  - Type: Council–Manager

Area
  - Total: 5.18 sq mi (13.42 km^{2})
  - Land: 2.40 sq mi (6.22 km^{2})
  - Water: 2.78 sq mi (7.21 km^{2})
- Elevation: 85 ft (26 m)

Population (2020)
  - Total: 7,032
  - Density: 2,930.3/sq mi (1,131.41/km^{2})
- Time zone: UTC-5 (Eastern (EST))
  - Summer (DST): UTC-4 (EDT)
- ZIP codes: 32809, 32812
- Area codes: 407, 689
- FIPS code: 12-05300
- GNIS feature ID: 2403838
- Website: www.belleislefl.gov

Belle Isle is a city in Orange County, Florida, United States. The population was 7,032 at the 2020 census. It is part of the Orlando–Kissimmee–Sanford Metropolitan Statistical Area.

== History ==
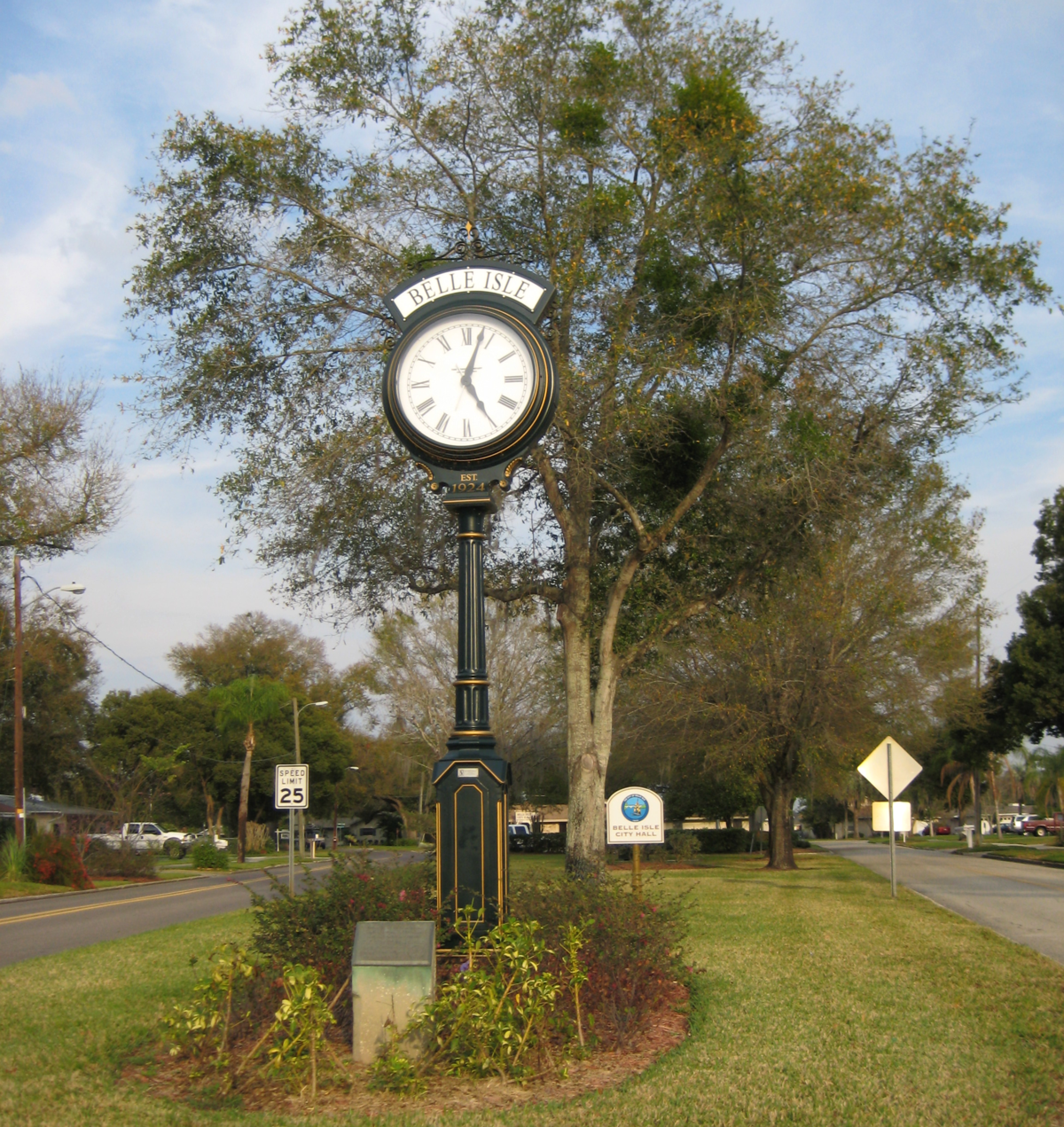
Belle Isle Clock near city hall

The Belle Isle area was first inhabited by the Timucua people circa the 9th century. The first organized government of Belle Isle was established in 1924, with C. H. Hoffner as the community's first mayor. This government lasted until 1928, when it was deactivated. Belle Isle was re-established in 1954, and has been running continuously since.

Since 2003, Belle Isle has run under a council-manager government, with the mayor being a strictly ceremonial position. Seven commissioners are elected to represent their respective districts on the city council. All elected officials serve three year terms without compensation.

In 2009, the City of Belle Isle established its own police department, which would take over the area's jurisdiction from the Orange County Sheriff. The incorporation of the department has almost doubled the total number of city employees, increasing the number from 11 to 20.

== Geography ==
According to the United States Census Bureau, the city has a total area of 5.1 square miles (13.2 km^{2}), of which 2.3 square miles (6.0 km^{2}) is land and 2.8 square miles (7.2 km^{2}) (54.42%) is water.

The city of Belle Isle is close to Orlando International Airport, being only three miles northwest of it; Orlando itself is only five miles north. Belle Isle is the location of Lake Conway, one of Greater Orlando's largest lakes. The southern portion of Little Lake Conway, another large lake, is also in Belle Isle.

== Demographics ==
Historical population
Census	Pop.	Note	%±
1930	160		—
1940	178		11.3%
1960	2,344		—
1970	2,705		15.4%
1980	2,848		5.3%
1990	5,272		85.1%
2000	5,531		4.9%
2010	5,988		8.3%
2020	7,032		17.4%
U.S. Decennial Census

=== Racial and ethnic composition ===
Belle Isle racial composition (Hispanics excluded from racial categories) (NH = Non-Hispanic)
Race	Pop 2010	Pop 2020	% 2010	% 2020
White (NH)	4,972	4,692	83.03%	66.72%
Black or African American (NH)	161	268	2.69%	3.81%
Native American or Alaska Native (NH)	10	3	0.17%	0.04%
Asian (NH)	94	240	1.57%	3.41%
Pacific Islander or Native Hawaiian (NH)	3	2	0.05%	0.03%
Some other race (NH)	18	25	0.30%	0.36%
Two or more races/Multiracial (NH)	67	263	1.12%	3.74%
Hispanic or Latino (any race)	663	1,539	11.07%	21.89%
Total	5,988	7,032	100.00%	100.00%

=== 2020 census ===
As of the 2020 census, Belle Isle had a population of 7,032. The median age was 44.9 years. 18.3% of residents were under the age of 18 and 18.7% of residents were 65 years of age or older. For every 100 females there were 99.9 males, and for every 100 females age 18 and over there were 101.1 males age 18 and over.

100.0% of residents lived in urban areas, while 0.0% lived in rural areas.

There were 2,746 households in Belle Isle, of which 32.1% had children under the age of 18 living in them. Of all households, 59.7% were married-couple households, 15.6% were households with a male householder and no spouse or partner present, and 18.2% were households with a female householder and no spouse or partner present. About 18.3% of all households were made up of individuals and 7.7% had someone living alone who was 65 years of age or older.

There were 2,893 housing units, of which 5.1% were vacant. The homeowner vacancy rate was 0.4% and the rental vacancy rate was 9.2%.

=== Demographic estimates ===
According to the 2020 ACS 5-year estimates, there were 2,075 families residing in the city.

=== 2010 census ===
As of the 2010 United States census, there were 5,988 people, 2,277 households, and 1,671 families residing in the city.

=== 2000 census ===
As of the census of 2000, there were 5,531 people, 2,199 households, and 1,618 families residing in the city. The population density was 2,873.2 inhabitants per square mile (1,109.3/km^{2}). There were 2,299 housing units at an average density of 1,194.3 per square mile (461.1/km^{2}). The racial makeup of the city was 91.88% White, 4.36% African American, 0.13% Native American, 1.25% Asian, 0.02% Pacific Islander, 1.32% from other races, and 1.05% from two or more races. Hispanic or Latino of any race were 5.98% of the population.

In 2000, there were 2,199 households, out of which 29.2% had children under the age of 18 living with them, 62.9% were married couples living together, 7.3% had a female householder with no husband present, and 26.4% were non-families. 20.2% of all households were made up of individuals, and 8.0% had someone living alone who was 65 years of age or older. The average household size was 2.52 and the average family size was 2.89.

In 2000, in the city, the population was spread out, with 22.7% under the age of 18, 4.7% from 18 to 24, 28.9% from 25 to 44, 27.0% from 45 to 64, and 16.7% who were 65 years of age or older. The median age was 42 years. For every 100 females, there were 100.4 males. For every 100 females age 18 and over, there were 99.3 males.

In 2000, the median income for a household in the city was $65,155, and the median income for a family was $68,571. Males had a median income of $47,394 versus $32,150 for females. The per capita income for the city was $29,087. About 1.9% of families and 2.9% of the population were below the poverty line, including 1.2% of those under age 18 and 4.2% of those age 65 or over.
