= Teresa Jacobs =

American politician

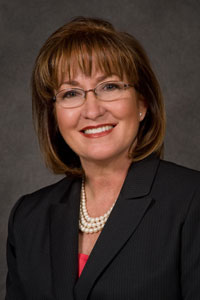

Chair of the Orange County Public School Board
- Incumbent
- Assumed office November 19, 2018
- Preceded by: Bill Sublette

4th Mayor of Orange County
- In office January 4, 2011 – November 19, 2018
- Preceded by: Richard Crotty
- Succeeded by: Jerry Demings

Member of the Orange County Commission from the 1st district
- In office January 3, 2001 – January 3, 2009
- Preceded by: Bob Freeman
- Succeeded by: Scott Boyd

Personal details
- Born: April 6, 1958 (age 68) Baltimore, Maryland, U.S.
- Party: Republican
- Spouse: Bruce Jacobs
- Education: Florida State University

Teresa Jacobs (born April 6, 1958, in Baltimore, Maryland) is an American politician serving since 2018 as the Chair of Orange County Public School Board. Jacobs previously served as Mayor of Orange County from 2011 until taking office as school board chair in November 2018, also having represented district 1 on the Orange County Board of County Commissioners from 2000 to 2008.

== Early life, education, and family ==
Jacobs was raised in Miami and Jupiter, Florida. She is a graduate of Florida State University, graduating cum laude with a degree in economics.

== Early business career ==
Jacobs moved to Atlanta, Georgia, in 1981. She was Assistant Vice President of National Bank of Georgia, Atlanta, from 1981 to 1989.

== Political career ==
Jacobs represented District 1 on the Board of County Commissioners, which encompasses southwest Orange County from Winter Garden to Hunter's Creek. She was elected in 2000, re-elected in 2004, and stepped down in 2008 due to term limits. Jacobs was credited with championing new ethics rules for county elected officials, and successfully strengthening local laws to prevent school overcrowding. She was elected President of the Florida Association of Counties in 2007.

=== 2010 Orange County mayoral campaign ===
Jacobs announced that she planned to run for Mayor of Orange County in 2010. She was the last candidate to enter the race. She was opposed by Bill Segal, Linda Stewart, and Matthew Falconer. On August 24, 2010, Stewart (19%) and Falconer (15%) were eliminated in the primary election. Jacobs (42%) and Segal (22%) both advanced to the general election in a run-off. In the general election on November 2, 2010, Jacobs resoundingly defeated Segal, 68%–32%, despite being out-fundraised 2–1.

=== 2014 Orange County mayoral campaign ===
Despite Val Demings having been in the race early on, she dropped out leaving Jacobs winning the election unopposed.

== Electoral history ==
Orange County Commission District 1 2000
Party	Candidate	Votes	%
Republican	Teresa Jacobs	11,554	68
Republican	Bob Freeman (incumbent)	4,610	27
Republican	Mike McEvers	826	4
Total votes		16,990	100

Orange County Commission District 1 2004
Party	Candidate	Votes	%
Republican	Teresa Jacobs (unopposed)	N/A	N/A

Orange County Mayor 2010
Party	Candidate	Votes	%
Republican	Teresa Jacobs	164,207	68
Democratic	Bill Segal	78,476	32
Total votes		243,683	100

Orange County Mayor 2014
Party	Candidate	Votes	%
Republican	Teresa Jacobs (unopposed)	N/A	N/A

== Current or previous state and regional board positions ==
- President, Florida Association of Counties (FAC)
- Chair, East Central Florida Regional Planning Council (ECFRPC)
- Member, Central Florida MPO Alliance, Member
- Chair, Central Florida Smart Growth Alliance (CFSGA)
- Member, MetroPlan Orlando Board
- Gubernatorial Appointee, Wekiva River Basin Commission
- Member, Myregion.org Executive Board of Directors
- Member, Florida Transportation Plan Steering Committee
- International Drive Master Transit and Improvement District Governing Board, Chair Person
- Lynx Board of Directors
- Orlando-Orange County Expressway Authority, Board of Directors
- Orlando-Orange County Expressway Authority, Finance Committee
- Greater Orlando Aviation Authority (GOAA), Board of Directors
- Central Florida Commuter Rail Commission (Sunrail), Vice Chairman
- Visit Orlando Board, Ex-Officio Director
- County Executives of America, Board of Directors
- Coalition for the Homeless of Central Florida
- Tourism Development Council (TDC), Chairman
- Central Florida Regional Commission on Homelessness, Co-Chair
- Congress of Regional Leaders, Member
- MyRegion.Org, Executive Board of Directors
- St. John's River Alliance

== See also ==
- Central Florida

Political offices
Preceded by Bill Sublette	Mayor of Orange County, Florida; 2011–2018	Succeeded by Jerry Demings
