= John Mina =

American law enforcement officer (born 1968)

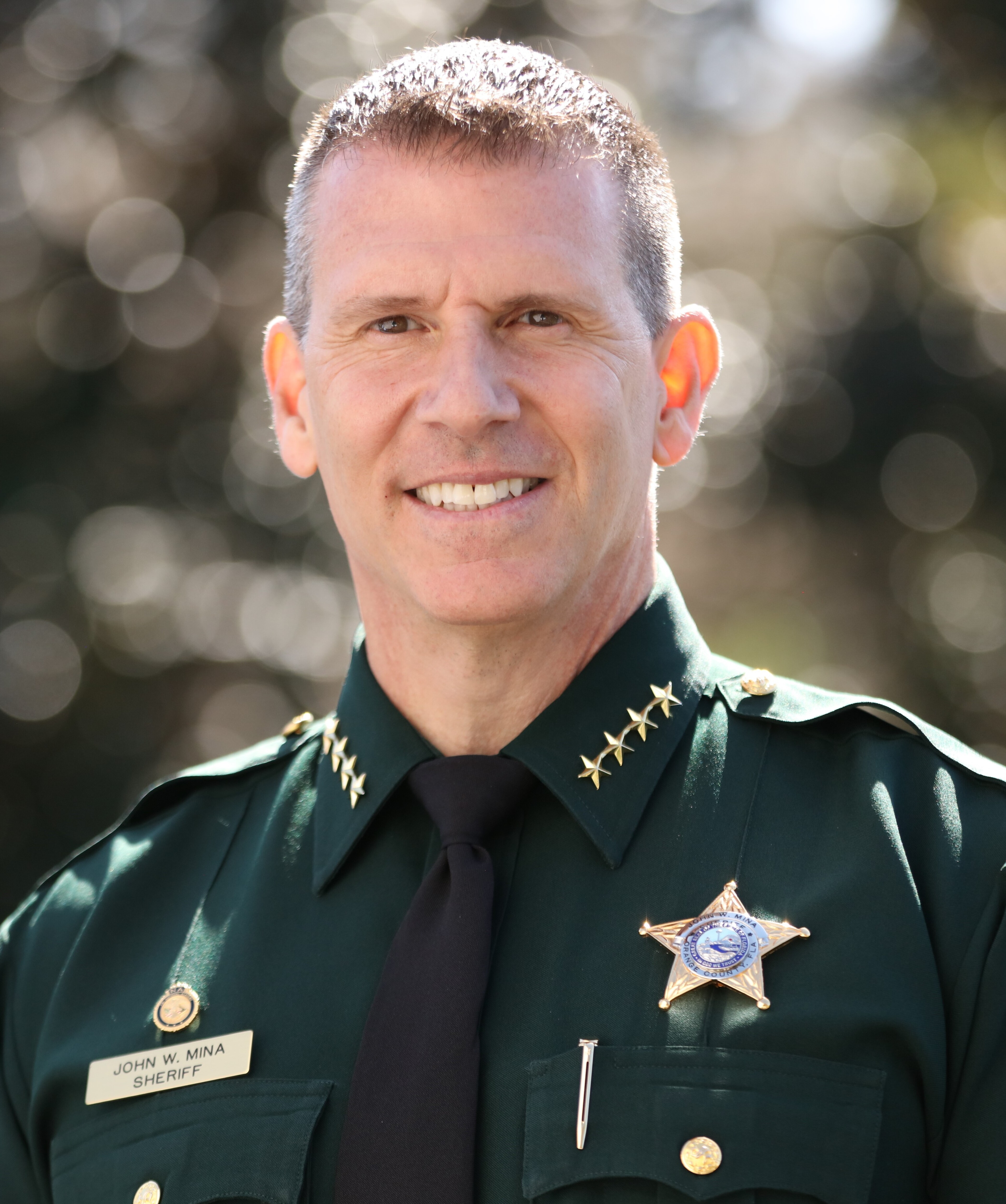
- Official portrait, 2025

29th Sheriff of Orange County
- Incumbent
- Assumed office December 4, 2018
- Preceded by: Jerry Demings

Chief of the Orlando Police Department
- In office February 24, 2014 – December 1, 2018
- Mayor: Buddy Dyer
- Preceded by: Paul Rooney
- Succeeded by: Orlando Rolón

Personal details
- Born: August 31, 1968 (age 58) New York City, New York, U.S.
- Party: Democratic (after 2020); Independent (before 2020)
- Spouse: Tracie Mina (m. 1992)
- Children: 2
- Education: Columbia College (BCJ); FBI National Academy
- Occupation: Law enforcement officer; politician; soldier

Military service
- Branch/service: United States Army
- Unit: 82nd Airborne Division; Military Police Corps
- Police career
- Allegiance: Orlando, Florida; Orange County
- Department: Orlando Police Department; Orange County Sheriff's Office
- Service years: 1991–2018; 2018–present
- Rank: Chief; Sheriff

John W. Mina (/minə/ MEENA; born August 31, 1968) is an American politician, law enforcement officer, and Army veteran who has served as the 29th sheriff of Orange County, Florida since 2018. A member of the Democratic Party, he previously served as chief of the Orlando Police Department from 2014 to 2018.

Mina served as chief of police during the 2016 Orlando nightclub massacre; the deadliest terrorist attack in the United States since the September 11 attacks and the deadliest mass shooting in U.S. history until the 2017 Las Vegas shooting.

== Early life and career ==
Mina was born on August 31, 1968. He received his bachelor's degree in criminal justice from Columbia College and graduated from the FBI National Academy. Mina is a veteran of the United States Army, having served in the 82nd Airborne Division and later the Military Police Corps.

Mina joined the Orlando Police Department in 1991. He worked in the Criminal Investigations Division and the Drug Enforcement Division while serving on the Orlando PD SWAT team for 17 years. While working an off-duty security job in December 1999, Mina shot and killed 17-year-old African American Joseph A. Dungee III during an armed robbery.

== Orlando Police chief (2014–2018) ==
In 2014, Paul Rooney announced his retirement as the 37th police chief; having succeeded Val Demings in 2011. After serving 23 years on the force, Mina was appointed as 38th chief of police by Orlando mayor Buddy Dyer and confirmed by the Orlando City Council on February 24, 2014.

Mina served as police chief during the Pulse nightclub shooting, which was then the deadliest mass shooting in U.S. history. When asked why the officers didn't proceed to the bathroom and engage Omar Mateen, Mina said it was because Mateen "went from an active shooter to a barricaded gunman" and had hostages. He also noted, "If he had continued shooting, our officers would have went in there." During the initial investigation, Mina said Mateen seemed organized and well-prepared.

At the request of Mina, the U.S. Department of Justice's Office of Community Oriented Policing Services (COPS) conducted a third-party "after-action assessment" of the Orlando Police Department's response to the shooting and its overall preparedness. COPS commissioned the Police Foundation to prepare the report, which was released in December 2017. The report concluded that the Orlando Police Department response "was appropriate and consistent with national guidelines and best practices" and saved lives. The report stated: "The initial tactical response was consistent with the OPD's active shooter training and recognized promising practices. However, as the incident became more complex and prolonged, transitioning from a barricaded suspect with hostages to an act of terrorism, the OPD's operational tactics and strategies were challenged by the increasing threat posed by the suspect's claim of improvised explosive devices inside the club and in vehicles surrounding the club." The report authors noted that they lacked access to FBI reports and other data about the crime scene and shooter, and did not have information about "potential law enforcement friendly fire."

Mina was chief of police during the Markeith Loyd manhunt. Mina expressed frustration over the fact that Loyd had not yet been captured, despite receiving more than 1,400 tips. Some of these tips led authorities to believe that Loyd had attempted to disguise himself by shaving his head. A digitally altered photo of Loyd without hair was released to aid in his identification.

In June 2018, Mina submitted his resignation; effective December 1. He was succeeded by Orlando Rolón as the 39th chief of the Orlando Police Department. Rolón assumed temporary police chief duties in October 2018.

== Sheriff of Orange County (2018–present) ==
Due to Florida's resign-to-run laws, incumbent sheriff Jerry Demings announced his retirement to run in the 2018 Orange County mayoral election, triggering a special election for the sheriff's office. In February 2018, Chief Mina announced his candidacy for the position. He ran as an independent against Florida Highway Patrol chief Joe Lopez, an independent, and Democratic nominee Darryl Sheppard. In November, Mina won the general election with 46% of the vote. On December 4, 2018, Mina was sworn in as the 29th elected sheriff of Orange County.

As sheriff, he was significantly involved in the COVID-19 pandemic response in Orange County; enforcing mandatory curfews and mask mandates. Mina also served during the George Floyd protests and marched with Black Lives Matter demonstrators against police brutality.

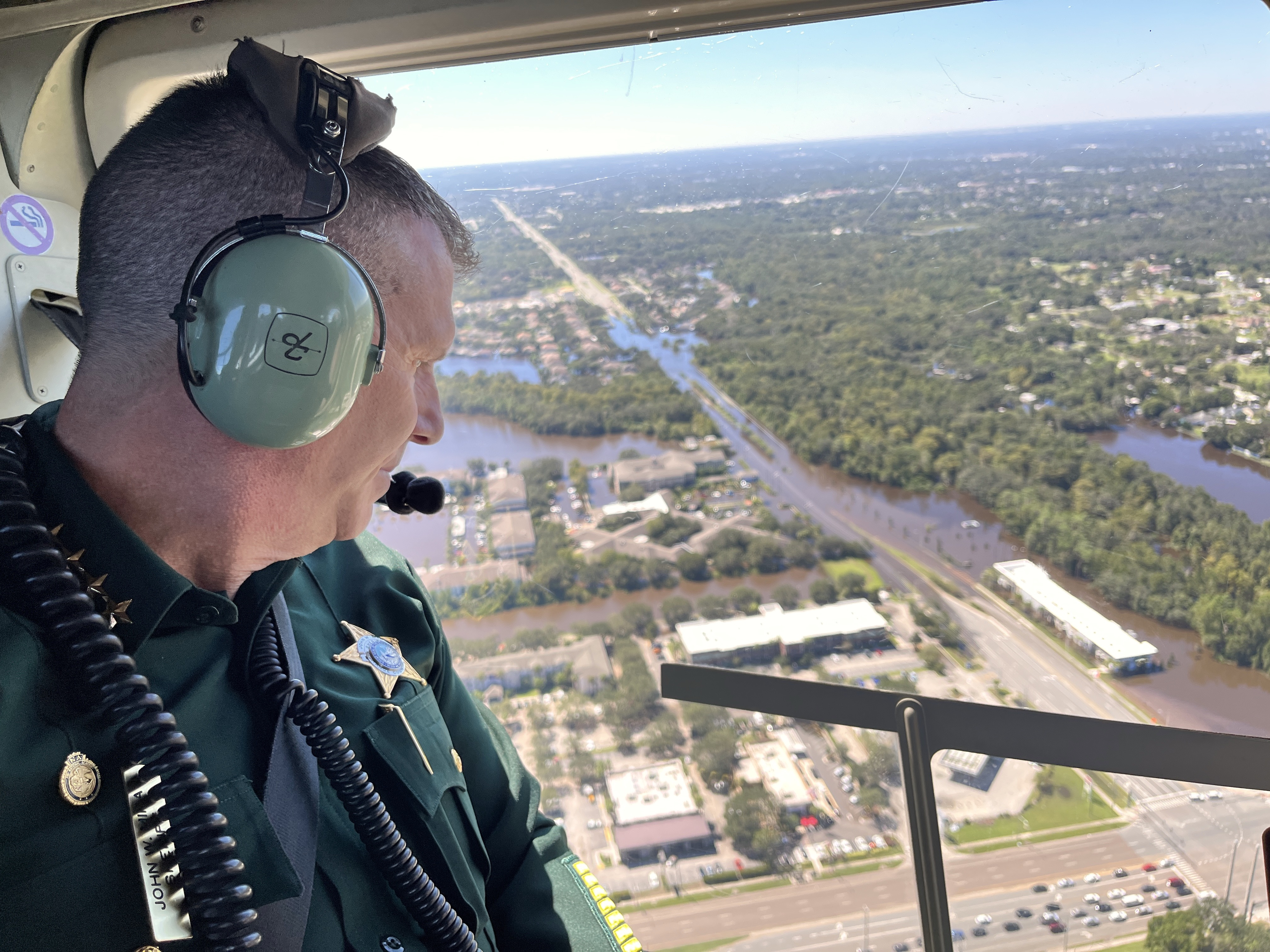
Mina surveying damage sustained from Hurricane Ian, September 2022

In 2020, Mina ran for re-election to a full term as sheriff as a member of the Democratic Party; winning the primary with 54% of the vote. He faced two minor write-in candidates in the general election, winning with over 95% of the vote. During his campaign, Mina was endorsed by Shaquille O'Neal, Stephanie Murphy, Darren Soto, and Jerry Demings.

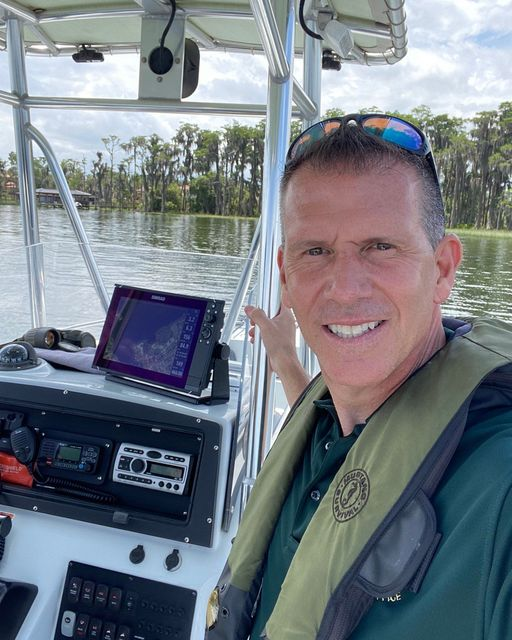
Mina with Marine Patrol on the Butler Chain of Lakes, March 2023

Following a series of shootings in Pine Hills, Mina became embroiled in a public "feud" with State Attorney Monique Worrell over solutions to address youth violence.

In 2024, Mina was re-elected unopposed to a third term as sheriff.

== Electoral history ==
2018 Orange County Sheriff special election
Party	Candidate	Votes	%
Independent	John Mina	205,949	45.5
Democratic	Darryl Sheppard	184,281	40.7
Independent	Joe Lopez	62,869	13.8
Total votes		453,099	100.00

2020 Orange County Sheriff Democratic primary election
Party	Candidate	Votes	%
Democratic	John Mina (inc.)	64,294	54.4
Democratic	Andrew Darling	17,824	15.1
Democratic	Jose Lopez	16,405	13.9
Democratic	Darryl Sheppard	10,399	8.8
Democratic	Eric McIntyre	9,368	7.9
Total votes		118,290	100.00

2020 Orange County Sheriff general election
Party	Candidate	Votes	%
Democratic	John Mina (inc.)	528,013	95.3
Independent	Winston Johnson	0	0
Independent	Tim Lucas Adams	0	0
Independent	Other/Write-in votes	26,053	4.7
Total votes		554,066	100.00
Democratic hold			

2024 Orange County Sheriff election
Party	Candidate	Votes	%	±%
Democratic	John Mina (inc.)	0	100%	
Republican	N/A	0	0%	
Democratic hold				

== Personal life ==
Mina is married to his wife, Tracie. They have two adult sons, Chase and Nicholas, and reside in Ocoee, Florida.

Political offices
Preceded by Jerry Demings	Sheriff of Orange County; 2018–present	Incumbent
Party political offices
Preceded by Darryl Sheppard	Democratic nominee for Sheriff of Orange County; 2020, 2024	Most recent
