= 2026 Orange County, Florida mayoral election =

American municipal election

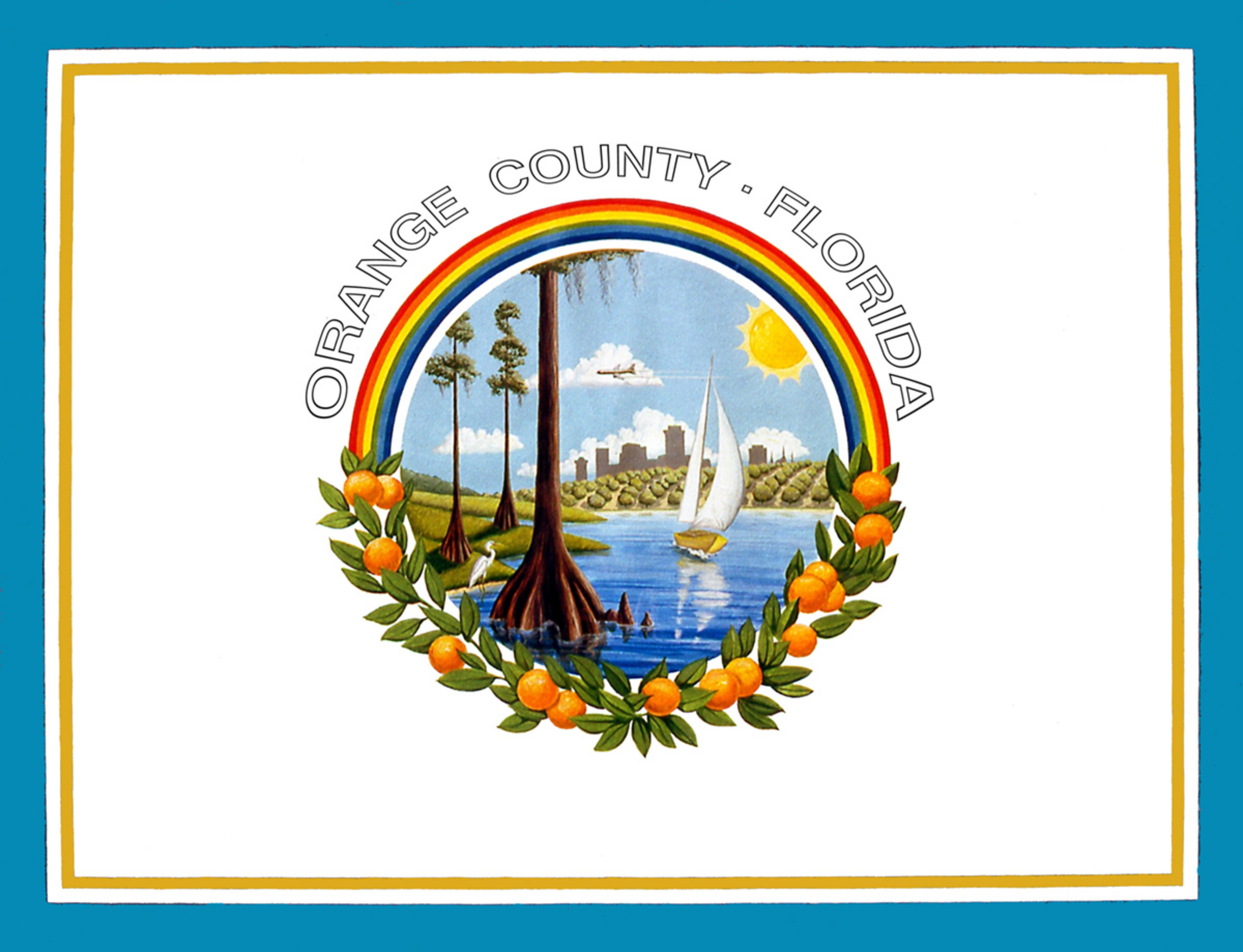
- August 18, 2026 (first round); November 3, 2026 (runoff)
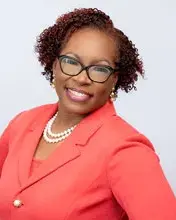

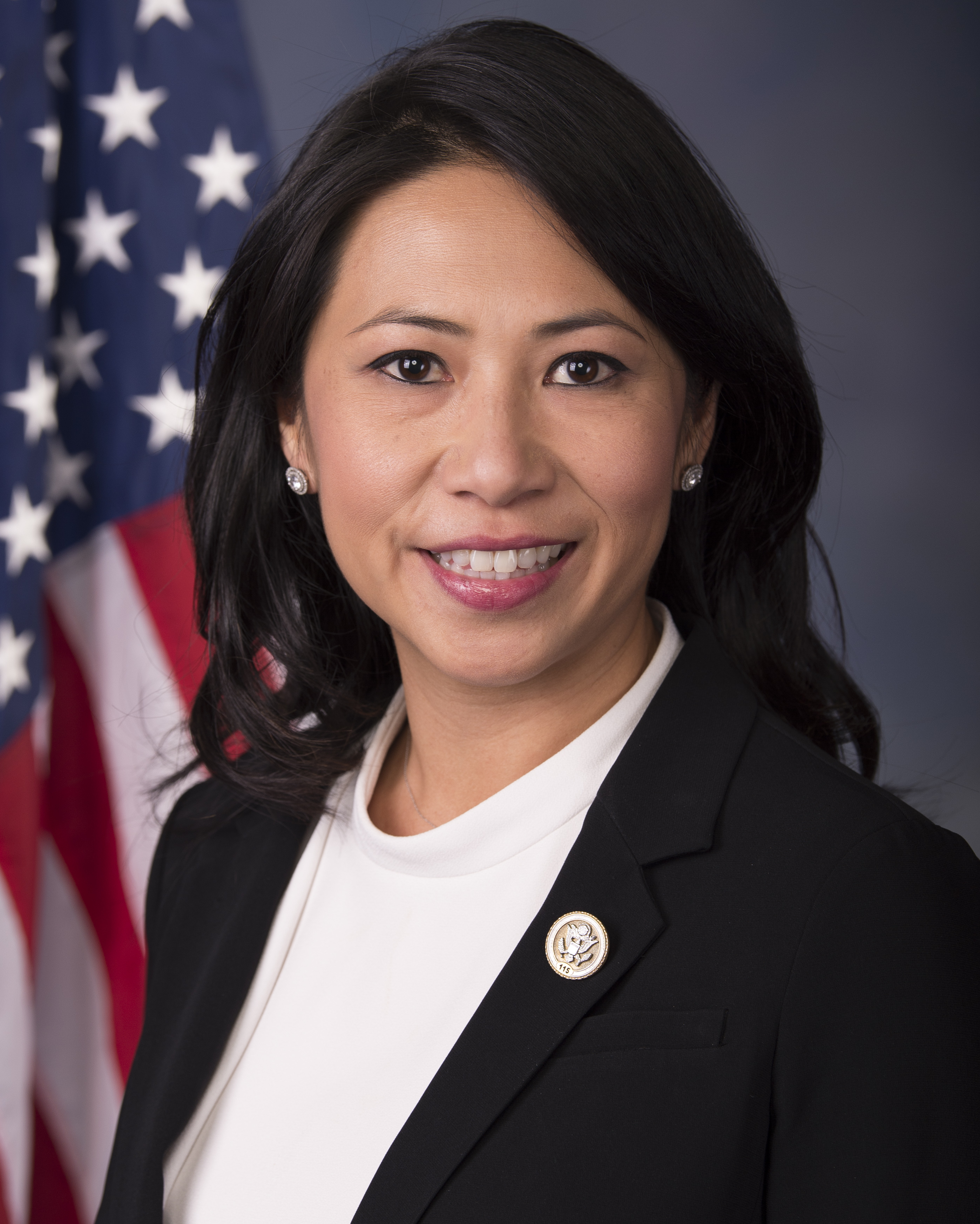

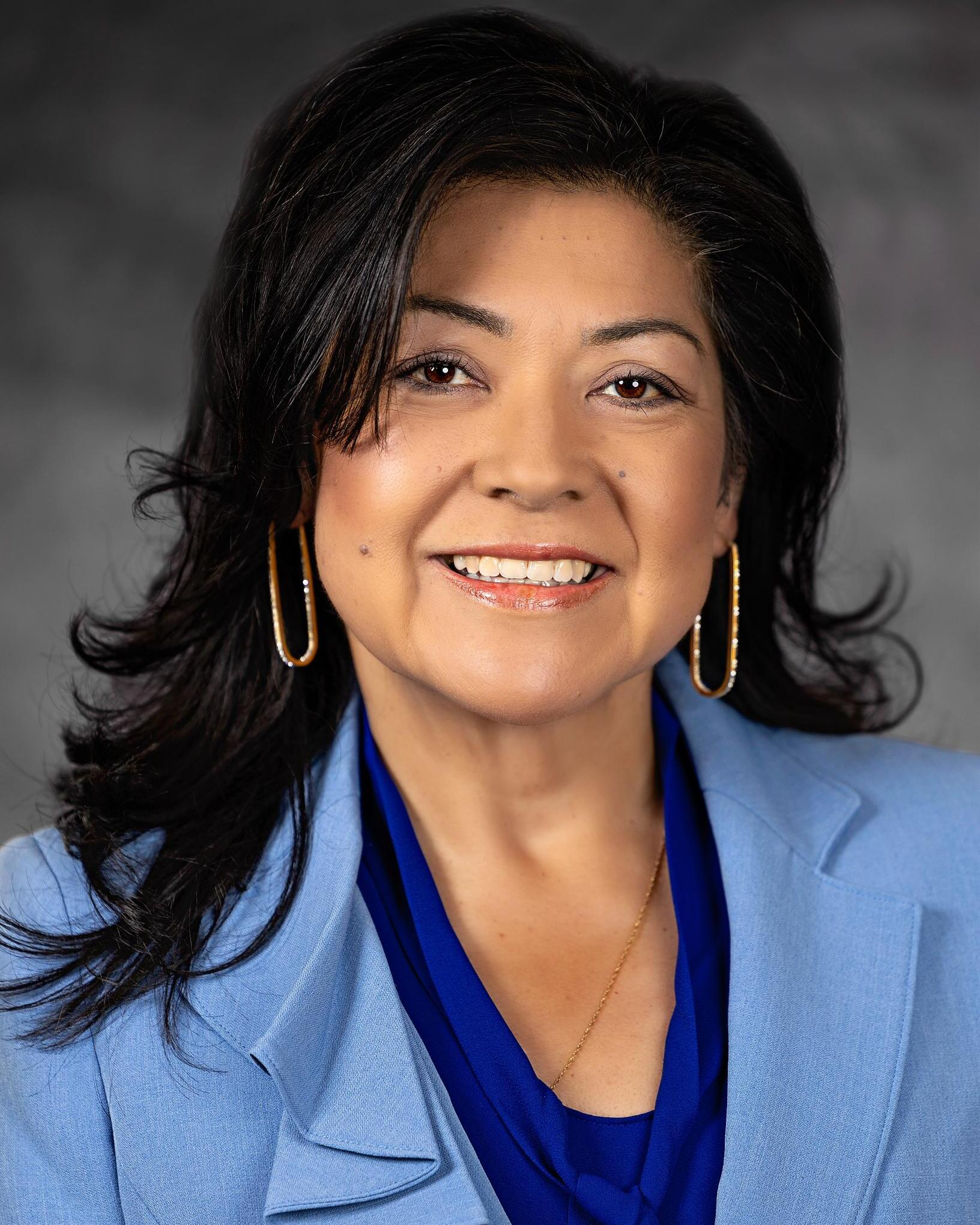
Candidate	Tiffany Moore Russell	Chris Messina
First round	56,041; 32.0%	47,432; 27.1%
Runoff	278,815; 58.76%	164,977; 34.77%
Candidate	Stephanie Murphy	Mayra Uribe
First round	45,796; 26.1%	25,642; 14.7%
Runoff	Eliminated	Eliminated
Mayor before election
Jerry Demings
Democratic
Elected mayor
Tiffany Moore Russell
Democratic

The 2026 Orange County mayoral election was held on November 3, 2026, to elect the mayor of Orange County, Florida. Incumbent mayor Jerry Demings is term-limited and cannot seek re-election to a third term in office. A nonpartisan primary election was held on August 18, 2026. The election will be officially nonpartisan.

== Candidates ==
=== Declared ===
- Chris Messina, tech entrepreneur and candidate for mayor in 2022 (Republican)
- Tiffany Moore Russell, Orange County clerk of the Circuit Court (Democratic)
- Stephanie Murphy, former U.S. representative from Florida's 7th congressional district (Democratic)
- Mayra Uribe, Orange County commissioner (Democratic)

=== Declined ===
- Val Demings, former U.S. representative, wife of incumbent Jerry Demings, and nominee for U.S. Senate in 2022 (Democratic)

== First round ==
=== Endorsements ===
Mayra Uribe

Labor unions

- Orange County Fraternal Order of Police

=== Debate ===
2026 Orange County mayoral election debate
No.	Date	Host	Nonpartisan	Nonpartisan	Nonpartisan	Nonpartisan
Key: P Participant A Absent N Not invited I Invited W Withdrawn						
Key: P Participant A Absent N Not invited I Invited W Withdrawn			Chris Messina	Tiffany Moore Russell	Stephanie Murphy	Mayra Uribe
1	Jul. 31, 2026	Orlando Regional Realtor Association; Tiger Bay Club of Central Florida	P	P	P	P

=== Results ===
2026 Orange County, Florida, mayoral primary election
Candidate	Votes	%
Tiffany Moore Russell	56,064	32.04%
Chris Messina	47,443	27.12%
Stephanie Murphy	45,809	26.18%
Mayra Uribe	25,650	14.66%
Total votes	174,966	100.00%

== Runoff ==
=== Endorsements ===
Tiffany Moore Russell

U.S. representatives

- Maxwell Frost, FL-10 (2023–present)

State legislators

- Anna Eskamani, state representative (2018–present)

Local officials

- Jerry Demings, incumbent mayor of Orange County (2018–present)
- Buddy Dyer, mayor of Orlando (2003–present)
- Glenda Hood, former mayor of Orlando (1992–2003) (Republican)

=== Results ===
2026 Orange County, Florida, mayoral runoff
Candidate	Votes	%
Chris Messina		
Tiffany Moore Russell		
Total votes		100.00%
