= BOLIVAR Act =

US legislative bill

Banning Operations and Leases with the Illegitimate Venezuelan Authoritarian Regime Act
- Acronyms (colloquial): BOLIVAR Act
- Announced in: the 117th United States Congress
- Number of co-sponsors: 16

Legislative history
- Introduced in the House as H.R. 621 by Michael Waltz (R–FL) on January 28, 2021; Committee consideration by Senate Homeland Security Permanent Subcommittee on Investigations

The Banning Operations and Leases with the Illegitimate Venezuelan Authoritarian Regime Act, known as the BOLIVAR Act for short, is a bill introduced by Congressman Michael Waltz and approved in the United States House of Representatives, and referred to the United States Senate. The proposal is aimed at ending government contracts with businesses working with the Nicolás Maduro administration in Venezuela. The acronym of the act is named after the Venezuelan independence leader Simón Bolívar.

== History ==
On 28 January 2021, Congressman Michael Waltz (R-FLA) introduced the “Banning Operations and Leases with the Illegitimate Venezuelan Authoritarian Regime (BOLIVAR) Act” with the goal to end government contracts with businesses working with the Nicolás Maduro administration in Venezuela and “prohibit the head of an executive agency from entering into a contract for the procurement of goods or services with any person that has business operations with the Maduro regime.” The proposal received support of several members of the Florida delegation, including Representatives Val Demings (D), Mario Diaz-Balart (R), Matt Gaetz (R), Carlos Giménez (R), Alcee Hastings (D), Stephanie Murphy (D), Bill Posey (R), María Elvira Salazar (R), Darren Soto (D) and Debbie Wasserman Schultz (D).

The bill was referred to the Senate Homeland Security and Governmental Affairs Committee, where by March it was supported by Senators Marco Rubio and Rick Scott. Scott brought the Senate version, noting that he signed a similar proposal into law when he was governor of Florida. Senators Rubio (R-FLA), Jacky Rosen (D-NEV), and Thom Tillis (R-NC) have co-sponsored the proposal. The bill was passed unanimously out of the committee on March 17.
