= Beary (disambiguation) =

The Beary or Byari are an ethnic group of South India.

Beary or Byari may also refer to:

- Beary language or Byari dialect, of the Malayalam language spoken by the Beary
- Byari (film), a 2011 Indian film
- Beary, a surname. Notable people with this name include:
  - Donald B. Beary (1888–1966), US Navy officer
  - Kevin Beary (born 1957), Sheriff of Orange County, Florida, US
  - Michael Beary (born 1956), Irish army officer

== See also ==
- The Beary Family, a cartoon series
- Bearys Institute of Technology, college in Mangalore, Karnataka, India
- USS Donald B. Beary (FF-1085), US Navy ship
