= John Mica =

American politician (born 1943)

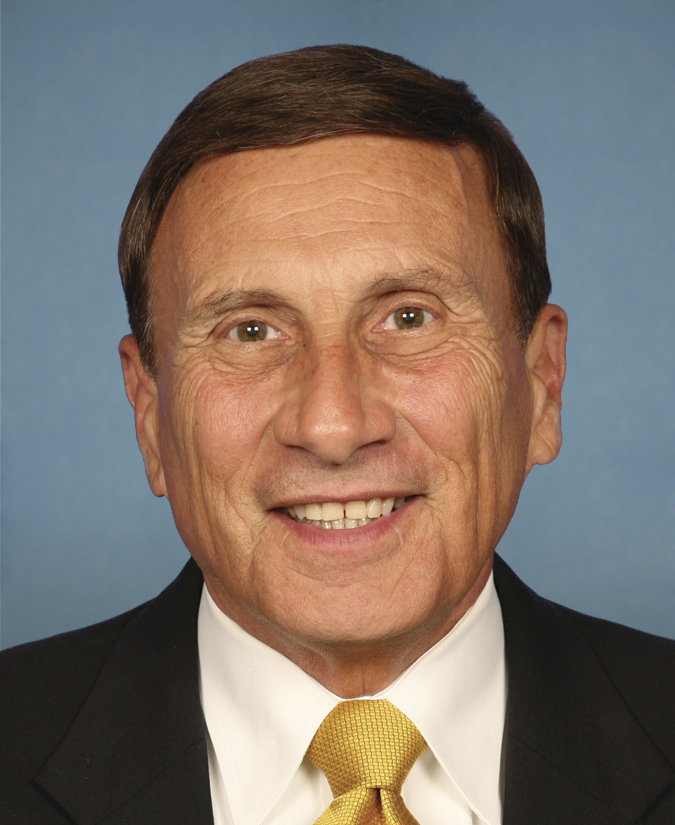

Chair of the House Transportation Committee
- In office January 3, 2011 – January 3, 2013
- Preceded by: Jim Oberstar
- Succeeded by: Bill Shuster

Ranking Member of the House Transportation Committee
- In office January 3, 2007 – January 3, 2011
- Preceded by: Jim Oberstar
- Succeeded by: Nick Rahall

Member of the U.S. House of Representatives from Florida's 7th district
- In office January 3, 1993 – January 3, 2017
- Preceded by: Sam Gibbons
- Succeeded by: Stephanie Murphy

Member of the Florida House of Representatives from the 39th district
- In office 1976–1980
- Preceded by: Harvey Matthews
- Succeeded by: Daniel Webster

Personal details
- Born: John Luigi Mica; January 27, 1943 (age 83) Binghamton, New York, U.S.
- Party: Republican
- Spouse: Patricia Mica
- Children: 2
- Relatives: Dan Mica (brother)
- Education: Miami Dade College; University of Florida (BA)
- Mica's voice Mica addressing reauthorization of the Federal Aviation Administration. Recorded May 21, 2009

John Luigi Mica (born January 27, 1943) is an American businessman, consultant and Republican politician who represented Florida's 7th congressional district in the U.S. House of Representatives from 1993 to 2017. He was defeated by Democrat Stephanie Murphy in the November 8, 2016, general election while serving his 12th term in office.

== Early life, education, and business career ==
Mica was born in Binghamton, New York, and grew up in Florida. He was educated at Miami Edison High School, Miami-Dade Community College and the University of Florida, where he received a degree in education and was a member of Delta Chi fraternity and Florida Blue Key. He has been a businessman serving in the real estate, telecommunications, government affairs and consulting fields.

== Early political career ==
Mica was a member of the Florida House of Representatives from 1976 to 1980 and served on several committees, including the Appropriations Committee. He was a staff member for Senator Paula F. Hawkins from 1981 to 1985 and became her chief of staff.

== U.S. House of Representatives ==
=== Elections ===
==== 1992 ====
In 1992, Mica ran for Congress in the 7th District, previously the 4th District represented by two-term Republican Craig T. James.

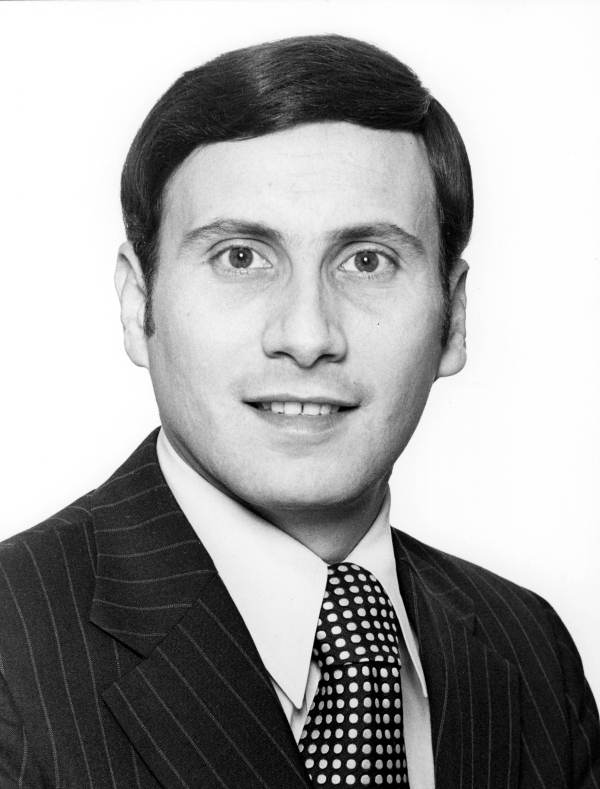
John Mica while a member of the Florida state legislature

Mica won the Republican primary with 53% of the vote, defeating State Representative Richard Graham (34%) and Vaughn Forrest (13%). In the general election, he defeated Democrat Dan Webster 56%–44%.

==== 1994–2004 ====
During this time period, he won re-election every two years with at least 60% of the vote.

==== 2006 ====
Mica defeated Jack Chagnon 63%–37%.

==== 2008 ====
Mica defeated Faye Armitage 62%–38%.

==== 2010 ====
Mica defeated Heather Beaven 69%–31%.

==== 2012 ====
For his first 10 terms, Mica represented a district that stretched from the Orlando suburbs through Daytona Beach all the way to St. Augustine.

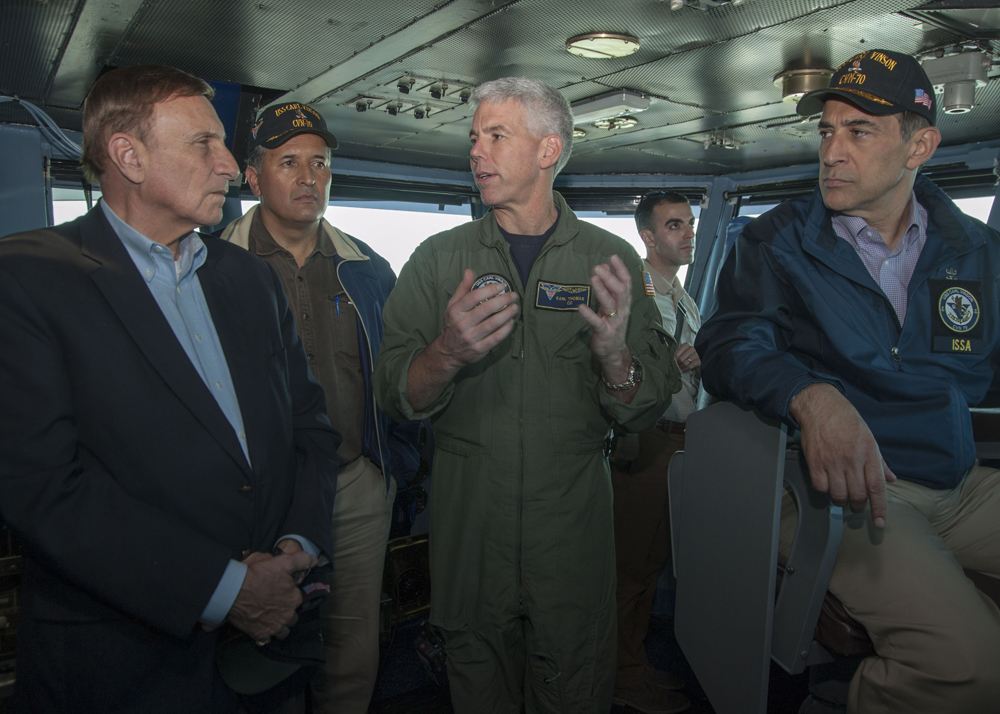
Mica with Congressman Darrell Issa on the Navigation bridge of the USS Carl Vinson in 2014.

After the 2010 Census, the bulk of Mica's territory became the 6th District. However, most of the Orange County portion, including Mica's home in Winter Park, was drawn into the new 7th District. That district had previously been the 24th District, represented by freshman Republican Sandy Adams. Although the new 7th was over 58 percent new to Mica, he defeated Adams in the Republican primary with 61 percent of the vote. In the general election, Mica defeated Jason Kendall 59%–41%.

==== 2014 ====
Mica defeated Wes Neuman 64%–32%.

==== 2016 ====
A court-ordered redistricting made the 7th slightly friendlier to Democrats. The new map cut out the district's share of Volusia County, while pushing it farther into Orlando.

The 7th had already been a marginal district, even though Mica had been elected twice from this district without serious difficulty. Mitt Romney narrowly won it over Barack Obama in 2012, with 51 percent of the vote. In contrast, had the redrawn 7th existed in 2012, Obama would have won it with 49.4 percent.

In the general election, Mica lost to Democrat Stephanie Murphy by a margin of 51%–49%.

=== Tenure ===
As the House Transportation GOP Leader, Mica served on all six Transportation and Infrastructure Subcommittees including Aviation; Coast Guard and Maritime Transportation; Economic Development, Public Buildings and Emergency Management; Highways and Transit; Railroads, Pipelines and Hazardous Materials; and Water Resources and Environment.

In November 1997, Mica was one of eighteen Republicans in the House to co-sponsor a resolution by Bob Barr that sought to launch an impeachment inquiry against President Bill Clinton. The resolution did not specify any charges or allegations. This was an early effort to impeach Clinton, predating the eruption of the Clinton–Lewinsky scandal. The eruption of that scandal would ultimately lead to a more serious effort to impeach Clinton in 1998. On October 8, 1998, Mica voted in favor of legislation that was passed to open an impeachment inquiry. On December 19, 1998, Mica voted in favor of all four proposed articles of impeachment against Clinton (only two of which received the needed majority of votes to be adopted).

As Chairman of the House Transportation and Infrastructure Committee from 2011 to 2013, Mica oversaw federal policy relating to aviation, highways, transit, rail transportation, pipelines, the Coast Guard, maritime transportation, and water infrastructure. Under his chairmanship, 55 bills were passed in the House, of which 30 were signed into law.<ref>{{cite web |title=Congressman John L. Mica |url=https://www.simulationinformation.com/hall-of-fame/members/john-l-mica/ |publisher=National Center for Simulation |access-date=2026-01-01}}</ref> From 2001 to 2006, Mica chaired the Subcommittee on Aviation. Following the September 11 attacks, he co-authored the Aviation and Transportation Security Law and worked to restore stability to the aviation industry.<ref>{{cite web |title=Rep. John L. Mica Official Biography |url=https://oversight.house.gov/rep-john-l-mica-biography/ |publisher=U.S. House Committee on Oversight and Government Reform |access-date=2026-01-01}}</ref>

== Policy positions ==
=== Abortion ===
Mica opposes abortion. Regarding taxpayer funding of abortion through Planned Parenthood, he has said "I think the majority of Americans would oppose public, federal dollars going into abortion."

=== Economic issues ===
Mica voted against the 2009 stimulus. He has brought federal money for Florida highways, SunRail, the Veterans Administration Medical Center, and the University of Central Florida.

=== Transportation ===
Mica supports Amtrak privatization.

Central Florida Infrastructure: Locally, Mica used his committee leverage to secure billions of federal dollars. He was the primary catalyst for launching SunRail (Central Florida's commuter rail line) and driving massive expansions at Orlando International Airport

The "Shovel" Legacy: Mica was so notoriously effective at routing federal construction funds back home that he joked about keeping an archive of 50 to 60 ceremonial groundbreaking shovels from major local projects

Mica has been opposed to the federal government contributing any additional funds towards repairing the Washington DC Metrorail system.

=== Marijuana ===
As chairman of the House Oversight Committee's subcommittee on government operations, Mica convened a hearing on marijuana legalization in 1999. It was the first such hearing since 1988. Mica opposes the legalization of recreational marijuana. Another such hearing was held by Mica in 2014 on the same subject, with multiple drug experts providing input.

== Electoral history ==
Florida's 7th congressional district election, 2006
Party	Candidate	Votes	%
Republican	John Mica (inc.)	149,656	63.08
Democratic	John F. Chagnon	87,584	36.92
Total votes		237,240	100.00
Republican hold			

Florida's 7th congressional district election, 2008
Party	Candidate	Votes	%
Republican	John Mica (incumbent)	238,721	62.0
Democratic	Faye Armitage	146,292	38.0
Total votes		385,013	100.00
Republican hold			

Florida's 7th congressional district election, 2010
Party	Candidate	Votes	%
Republican	John Mica (Incumbent)	184,868	69
Democratic	Heather Beaven	82,999	31
Total votes		267,867	100

Republican primary results
Party	Candidate	Votes	%
Republican	John Mica (incumbent)	32,119	61.2
Republican	Sandra Adams (incumbent)	20,404	38.8
Total votes		52,523	100.0

Florida's 7th congressional district, 2012
Party	Candidate	Votes	%
Republican	John Mica (incumbent)	185,518	58.7
Democratic	Jason H. Kenall	130,479	41.3
Independent	Fred Marra (write-in)	13	0.0
Total votes		316,010	100.0
Republican hold			

Republican primary results
Party	Candidate	Votes	%
Republican	John Mica (incumbent)	32,084	72.2
Republican	David Smith	8,316	18.7
Republican	Don Oehlrich	2,285	5.1
Republican	Kelly Shirley	1,786	4.0
Total votes		44,471	100.0

Florida's 7th congressional district, 2014
Party	Candidate	Votes	%
Republican	John Mica (incumbent)	144,474	63.6
Democratic	Wes Neuman	73,011	32.1
Independent	Al Krulick	9,679	4.3
Total votes		227,164	100.0
Republican hold			

Republican primary results
Party	Candidate	Votes	%
Republican	John Mica (incumbent)	38,528	77.2
Republican	Mark Busch	11,407	22.8
Total votes		49,935	100.0

Florida's 7th congressional district, 2016
Party	Candidate	Votes	%
Democratic	Stephanie Murphy	182,039	51.5
Republican	John Mica (incumbent)	171,583	48.5
Independent	Mike Plaskon (write-in)	33	0.0
Total votes		353,655	100.0
Democratic gain from Republican			

== Committee assignments ==
Mica was chairman of the House Transportation and Infrastructure Committee from January 3, 2011, to December 2012.

- Committee on Transportation and Infrastructure (former Chair)
- Committee on Oversight and Government Reform
  - Subcommittee on Information Policy, Census, and National Archives
  - Subcommittee on National Security and Foreign Affairs

== Personal life ==
Mica is married to Patricia, a schoolteacher, and has two grown children. He lives in Winter Park, Florida. He is the brother of former Representative Daniel A. Mica, while his other brother, David, is a former ranking staffer of Senator Lawton Chiles. He is a member of the Kennedy Center Board of Trustees and the Coast Guard Academy Board of Visitors. He is an Episcopalian.

U.S. House of Representatives
Preceded by Sam Gibbons	Member of the U.S. House of Representatives from Florida's 7th congressional district 1993–2017	Succeeded by Stephanie Murphy
Preceded by Jim Oberstar	Ranking Member of the House Transportation Committee; 2007–2011	Succeeded by Nick Rahall
Preceded by Jim Oberstar	Chair of the House Transportation Committee; 2011–2013	Succeeded by Bill Shuster
U.S. order of precedence (ceremonial)
Preceded by Spencer Bachus as Former U.S. Representative	Order of precedence of the United States as Former U.S. Representative	Succeeded by Ron Paul as Former U.S. Representative
