= 2018 Orange County, Florida mayoral election =

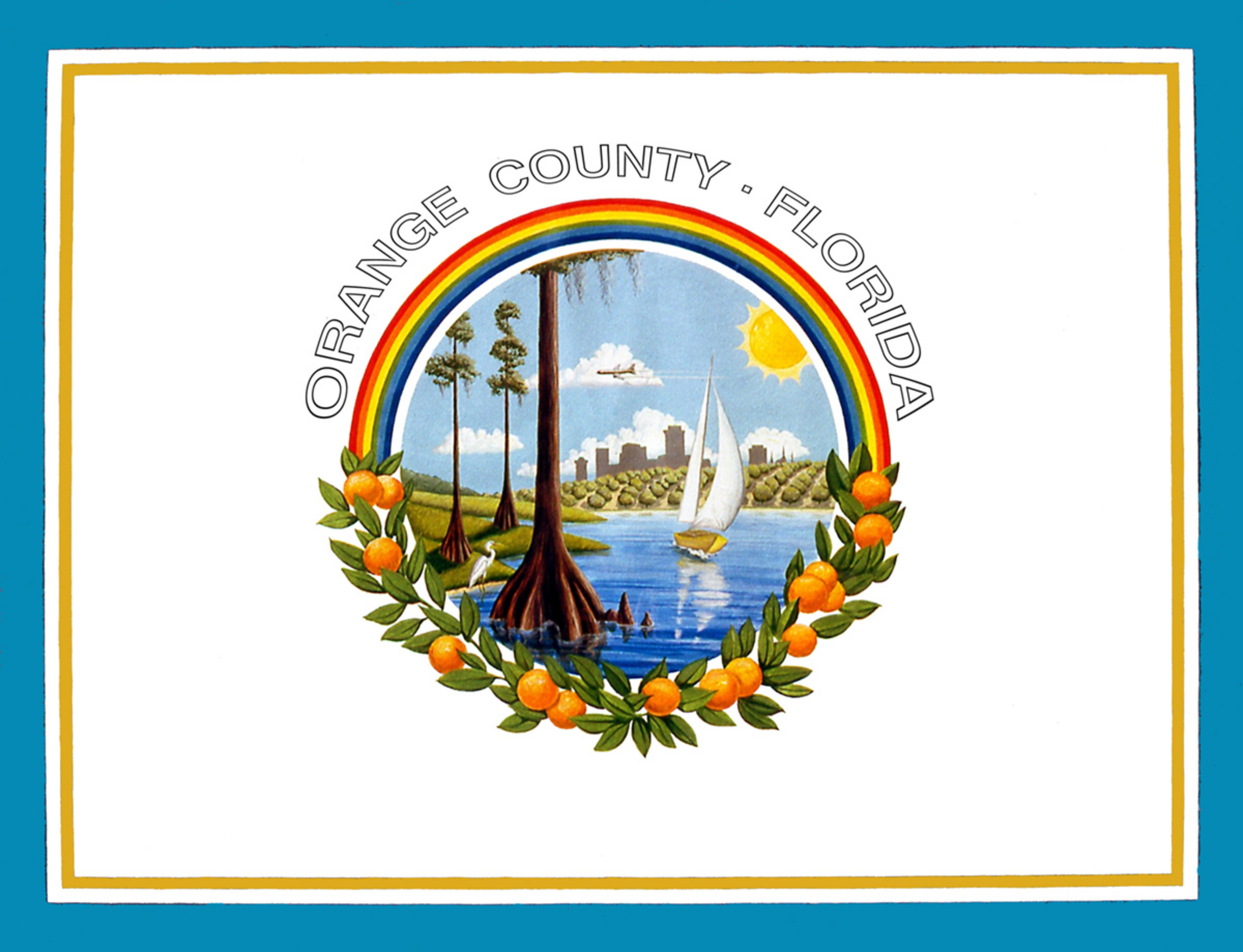
- August 28, 2018
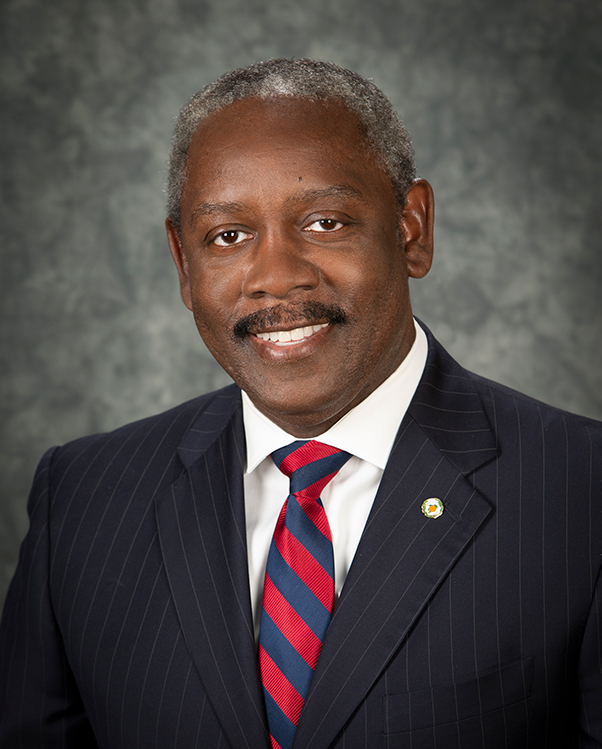

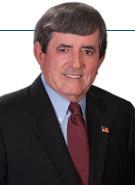

Candidate	Jerry Demings	Pete Clarke	Rob Panepinto
Party	Nonpartisan	Nonpartisan	Nonpartisan
Popular vote	114,579	40,906	30,453
Percentage	61.62%	22.00%	16.38%
Mayor before election
Teresa Jacobs
Nonpartisan
Elected mayor
Jerry Demings
Nonpartisan

The 2018 Orange County, Florida, mayoral election took place on August 28, 2018. Incumbent Mayor Teresa Jacobs was term-limited and could not run for a third consecutive term. Orange County Sheriff Jerry Demings, a Democrat, ran to succeed Jacobs. He faced two Republican opponents in the nonpartisan primary election: County Commissioner Pete Clarke and business consultant Rob Panepinto. Demings defeated both of them by a wide margin, winning 62 percent of the vote to Clarke's 22 percent and Panepinto's 16 percent, avoiding the need for a runoff election.

== Primary election ==
=== Candidates ===
- Jerry Demings, Orange County Sheriff (Democratic)
- Pete Clarke, Orange County Commissioner (Republican)
- Rob Panepinto, nonprofit and business consultant (Republican)

=== Results ===
2018 Orange County, Florida, mayoral election
Party	Candidate	Votes	%
Nonpartisan	Jerry Demings	114,579	61.62%
Nonpartisan	Pete Clarke	40,906	22.00%
Nonpartisan	Rob Panepinto	30,453	16.38%
Total votes		185,938	100.00%
