= Orlando Police Department =

Police department in Orlando, Florida

Coordinates: 28.541285°N 81.383455°W

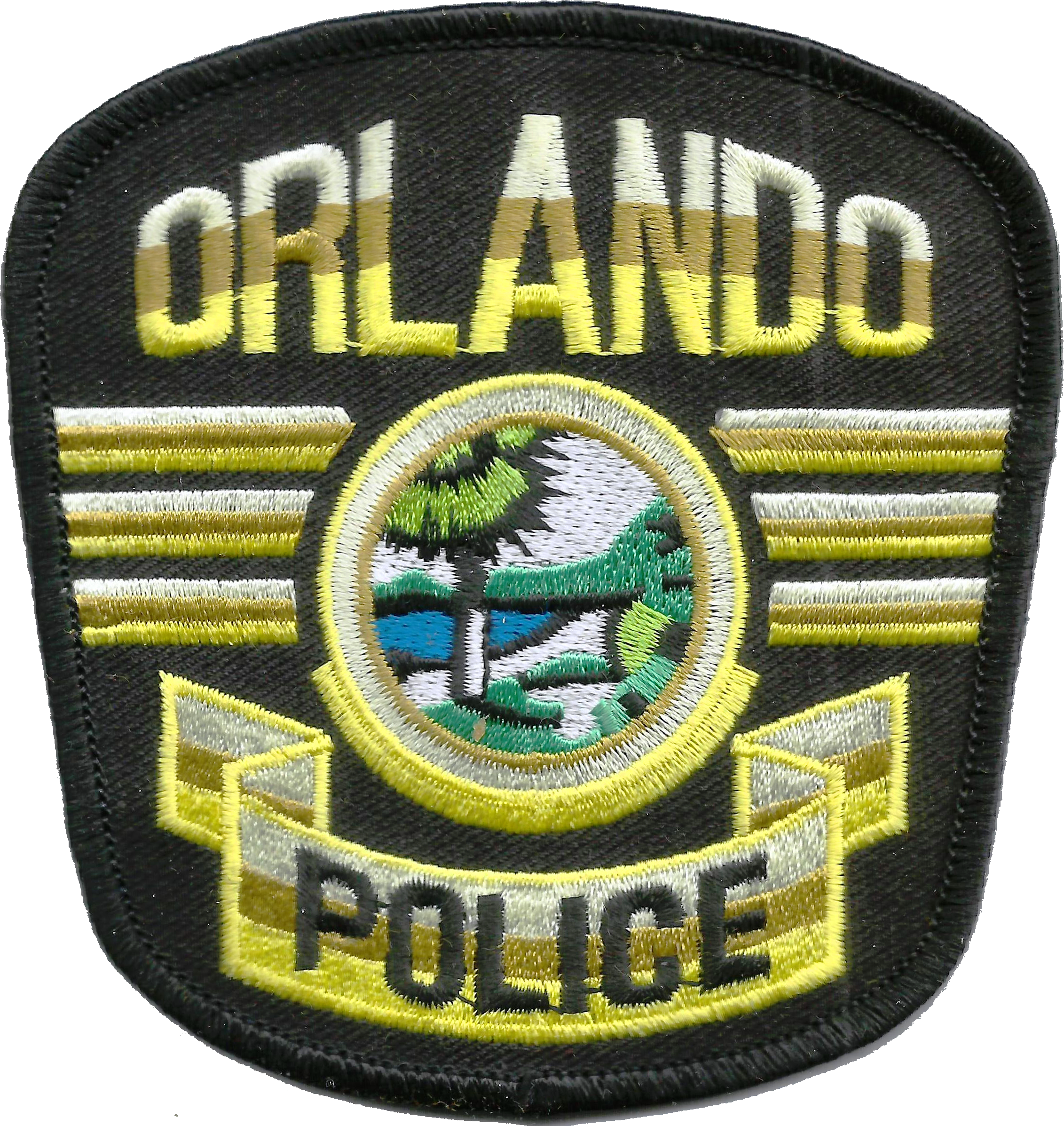
- Patch of the Orlando P.D.

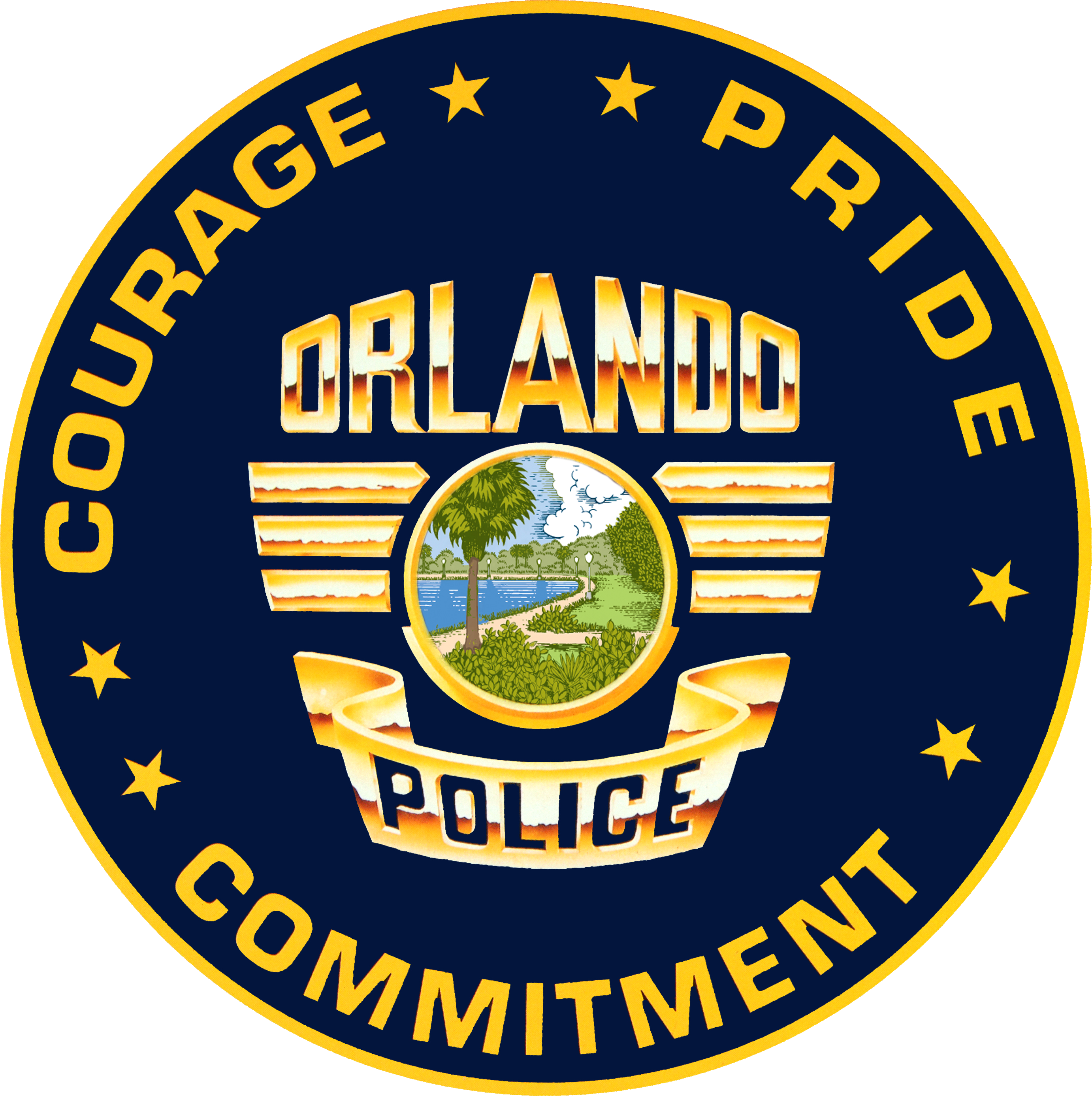
- Seal of the Orlando P.D.
- Abbreviation: OPD
- Motto: "Courage, Pride, Commitment"

Agency overview
- Formed: 1875

Jurisdictional structure
- Legal jurisdiction: City of Orlando

Operational structure
- Sworn members: 1023+
- Unsworn members: 150+
- Agency executive: Eric D. Smith, Chief of Police

Facilities
- Lockups: Orange County Corrections

Website
- Official website

The Orlando Police Department (OPD) is the municipal law enforcement responsible within the city limits of Orlando, Florida, United States. The OPD employs over 1023 sworn officers and over 150 civilian employees serving the citizens of Orlando through crime prevention, criminal investigations, and apprehension, neighbourhood policing, involvement through the schools with young people and overall delivery of police services.

The current Chief of Police is Eric Smith.

== History ==
In the 1960s, the OPD ran a firearm training program for women, in response to increased rates of rape.

Jerry Demings became the OPD's first African-American chief in 1998, and served until 2002.

The police department has managed, along with local radio program The Monsters in the Morning on WTKS-FM, a "no questions asked" gun exchange for gift cards or sports shoes. In August, 2007, a man turned in an item first identified as a rocket launcher resulting in international publicity. The item was later determined to be an empty carrying case for a TOW missile and its launcher.

Orlando's first female police chief, Val Demings, was appointed in 2007. Her husband, former police chief Jerry was elected Sheriff of Orange County in 2008: his opponent mentioned his wife's position as a potential conflict of interest. Violent crime in Orlando decreased drastically during her tenure as chief. Demings retired on June 1, 2011.

A 2008 Orlando Weekly exposé described the Orlando Police Department as "a place where rogue cops operate with impunity, and there's nothing anybody who finds himself at the wrong end of their short fuse can do about it." A 2015 article about Val Deming's congressional campaign in The Atlantic stated that the Orlando Police Department "has a long record of excessive-force allegations, and a lack of transparency on the subject, dating back at least as far as Demings's time as chief." Demings responded with an op-ed in the Orlando Sentinel, writing, "Looking for a negative story in a police department is like looking for a prayer at church", adding, "It won't take long to find one." In the same op-ed, she cast doubt on video evidence that conflicts with officers' statements in excessive force cases, writing, "a few seconds (even of video) rarely capture the entire set of circumstances."

In 2010, an Orlando police officer flipped 84-year-old World War II veteran Daniel Daley over his shoulder after the man became belligerent, throwing him to the ground and breaking a vertebra in his neck. Daley alleged excessive force and filed a lawsuit. The police department cleared the officer as "justified" in using a "hard take down" to arrest Daley, concluding he used the technique correctly even though he and the other officer made conflicting statements. Demings said "the officer performed the technique within department guidelines" but also that her department had "begun the process of reviewing the use of force policy and will make appropriate modifications." A federal jury ruled in Daley's favor and awarded him $880,000 in damages.

John Mina was chief of police from 2014 to 2018. The OPD together with the Orange County Sheriff's Office responded to the Orlando nightclub shooting in 2016. An OPD officer ultimately shot and killed shooter Omar Mateen after he fired on the responding officers.

In 2017, Master Sgt. Debra Clayton was shot and killed by a man who was wanted in the death of his pregnant ex-girlfriend. A deputy of the sheriff's office also died in the ensuing pursuit of the suspect.

In 2019, an Orlando Police officer arrested a 6-year-old girl after she kicked a school staff member during a tantrum, and a 6-year-old boy later that same day. The officer was terminated.

In 2022, the OPD was kicked out of the Active Bystandership for Law Enforcement (ABLE) training program after an instructor wrote to ABLE stating that officers were not taking the full eight hours of the class.

Since the establishment of the Orlando Police Department, 15 officers have died in the line of duty.

== Academy ==
Through a joint effort with other local agencies and Valencia College, uncertified newly hired officers attend a 22-week academy at the Criminal Justice Institute at VCC.

== Organization ==
=== Specialized units ===
OPD operates a wide range of specialized enforcement units including:

- Traffic Enforcement
- Mounted Patrol (Horses)
- Criminal Investigation Units
- Marine Patrol
- Airport Division (Orlando International Airport)
- Bike Unit
- K-9 Unit
- Gang Unit
- SWAT
- International Drive Team
- DUI Enforcement Team
- Illegal taxi operation crackdowns
- School Resource Officers

== Demographics ==
Over the years, the demographics of full-time sworn personnel were:

Year	Percentage of full-time sworn personnel							
Year	Female	Male	African American or Black	American Indian	Asian/Pacific Islander	Hispanic, any race	White, non-Hispanic	Other race
1993	14.6	85.4	17.3	0.4	1.1	6.9	74.4	—N/a
1997	18	82	21	0	2	11	67	—N/a
2000	20	80	21	0	2	13	63	0

== Controversies ==
=== Abuse of Power ===
On June 6, 2023, Alexander Shaouni (police officer) of Orlando Police Department was caught recklessly speeding, driving 80 mph in a 45 mph zone. The Seminole County deputy sheriff drove over 90 mph just to catch up to Shaouni. Shaouni can be seen and heard on the viral video with deputy sheriff saying, "What? I am going to work, my man. Why are you trying to pull me over as I am going to work?"

Orlando Officer Drive Off After Deputy Pulls Him Over For Speeding

== See also ==
- List of U.S. state and local law enforcement agencies
- List of law enforcement agencies in Florida
