= Orange County Sheriff's Office (Florida) =

Law enforcement agency in Florida, U.S.

Coordinates: 28.5517°N 81.4120°W

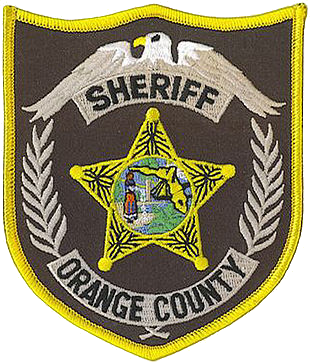

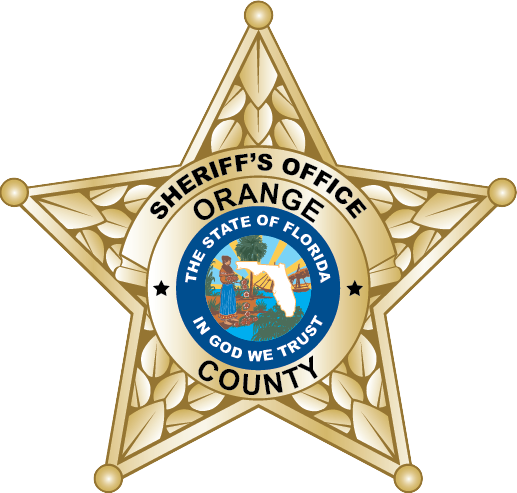

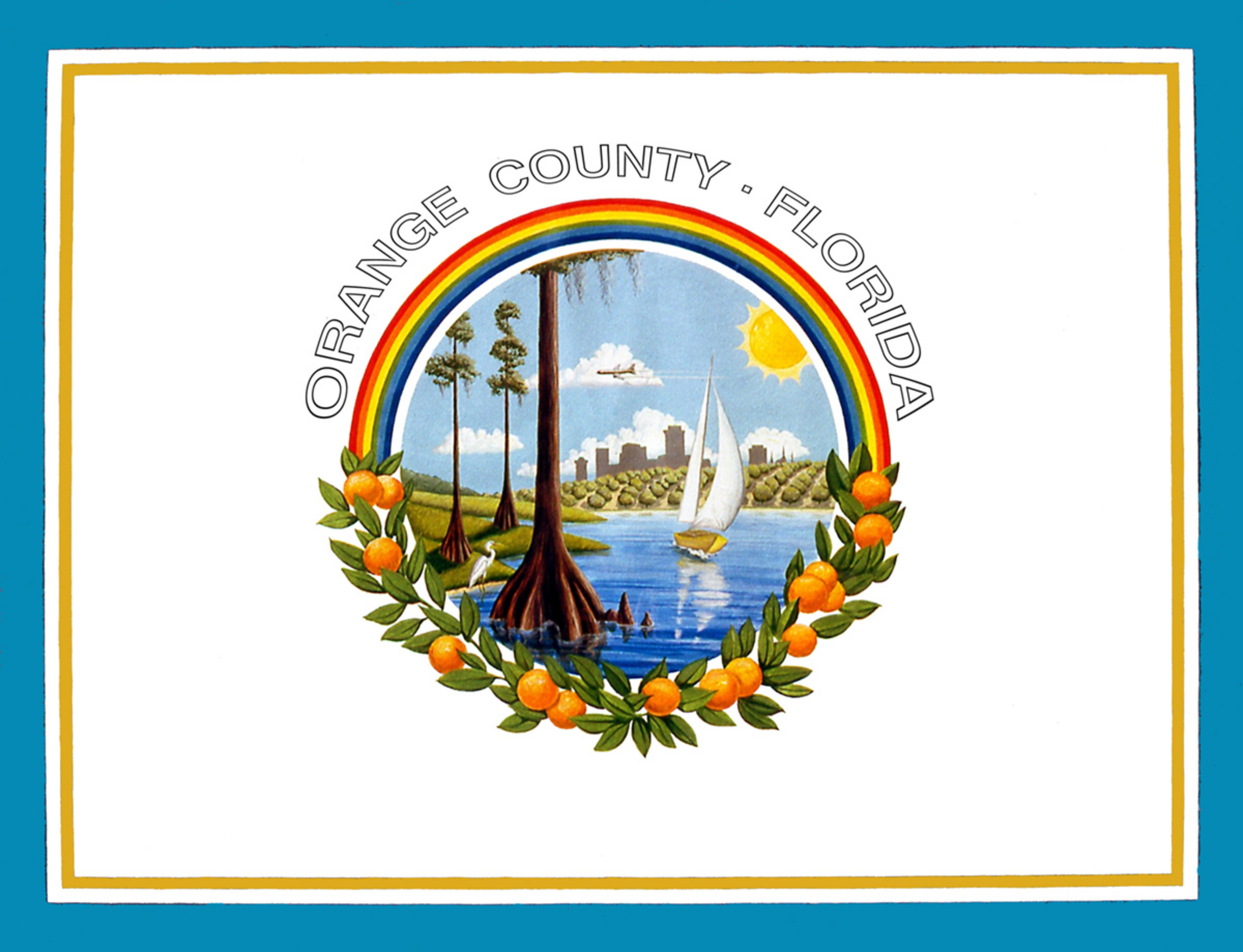
- Flag of Orange County
- Abbreviation: OCSO

Agency overview
- Formed: 1845

Jurisdictional structure
- Operations jurisdiction: USA
- Map of Orange County Sheriff's Office's jurisdiction
- Area: 1,004 square miles (2,600 km^{2})
- Population: 1,066,113
- General nature: Local civilian police

Operational structure
- Headquarters: Orlando, Florida
- Agency executive: John Mina, Sheriff

Website
- Official website

The Orange County Sheriff's Office is the chief law enforcement agency for Orange County, Florida. The office is large with a budget of more than $300 million and over 2,700 sworn and civilian employees. The current sheriff, John Mina, was elected in a 2018 special election, and is the chief law enforcement officer of Orange County responsible for the safety of over one million residents and the more than 72 million tourists that visit Orange County each year.

== History ==
The first sheriff of Orange County dates from the earliest days of Florida's statehood in 1845. On January 31, 1845, the area known as Mosquito County in territorial Florida was renamed Orange County, a name reflective of the spreading blanket of orange groves throughout the region. Less than six weeks later, on March 3, 1845, Florida's status as a territory was changed to that of statehood. The first statewide election was conducted on May 26, 1845. William Henry Williams was elected to serve as Orange County's first sheriff.

Since 1845, numerous prominent individuals have held the position of the Orange County sheriff, including David William Mizell. Mizell was the only sheriff killed in the line of duty. There have been numerous theories and tales regarding the story which led to his demise, ranging from the local tradition of the Barber–Mizell feud to Reconstruction politics to a lawman simply attempting to do his additional duty of levying fines and collecting taxes.

In 2000, during a hostage standoff in Orlando, a SWAT team sniper accidentally shot a hostage instead of the hostage-taker. The city and the OCSO settled with the hostage's family for $3.9 million dollars, with OCSO paying $1.9 million.

In 2004, state senator Gary Siplin stated that the OCSO routinely used deadly force against unarmed African Americans.

Together with the Orlando Police Department, the OCSO responded to the 2016 Orlando nightclub shooting.

== Notable people ==
- Sandy Adams, investigator, later member of the Florida House of Representatives (2002–2010) and US House (2011–2013)
- Kevin Beary, sheriff (1993–2009)
- Jerry Demings, sheriff (2009–2018)

== Rank structure ==
The order of rank for the agency is as follows:

Sworn ranks

- Sheriff
- Undersheriff
- Bureau chief deputy (bureau commander)
- Major (division commander)
- Captain (section/sector commander)
- Lieutenant
- Sergeant
- Corporal
- Deputy sheriff first class
  - Master deputy
  - Detective
  - Agent
- Deputy sheriff
  - Detective
  - Agent
  - Trainee
- Court security deputy
- Reserve deputy
- Auxiliary deputy

== List of sheriffs ==
Sheriff of Orange County
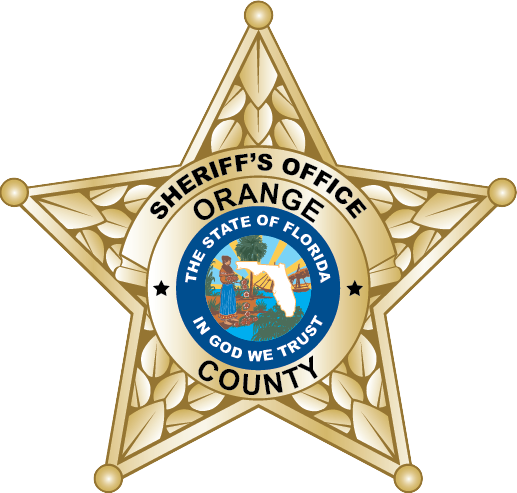
- Seal of the Orange County Sheriff

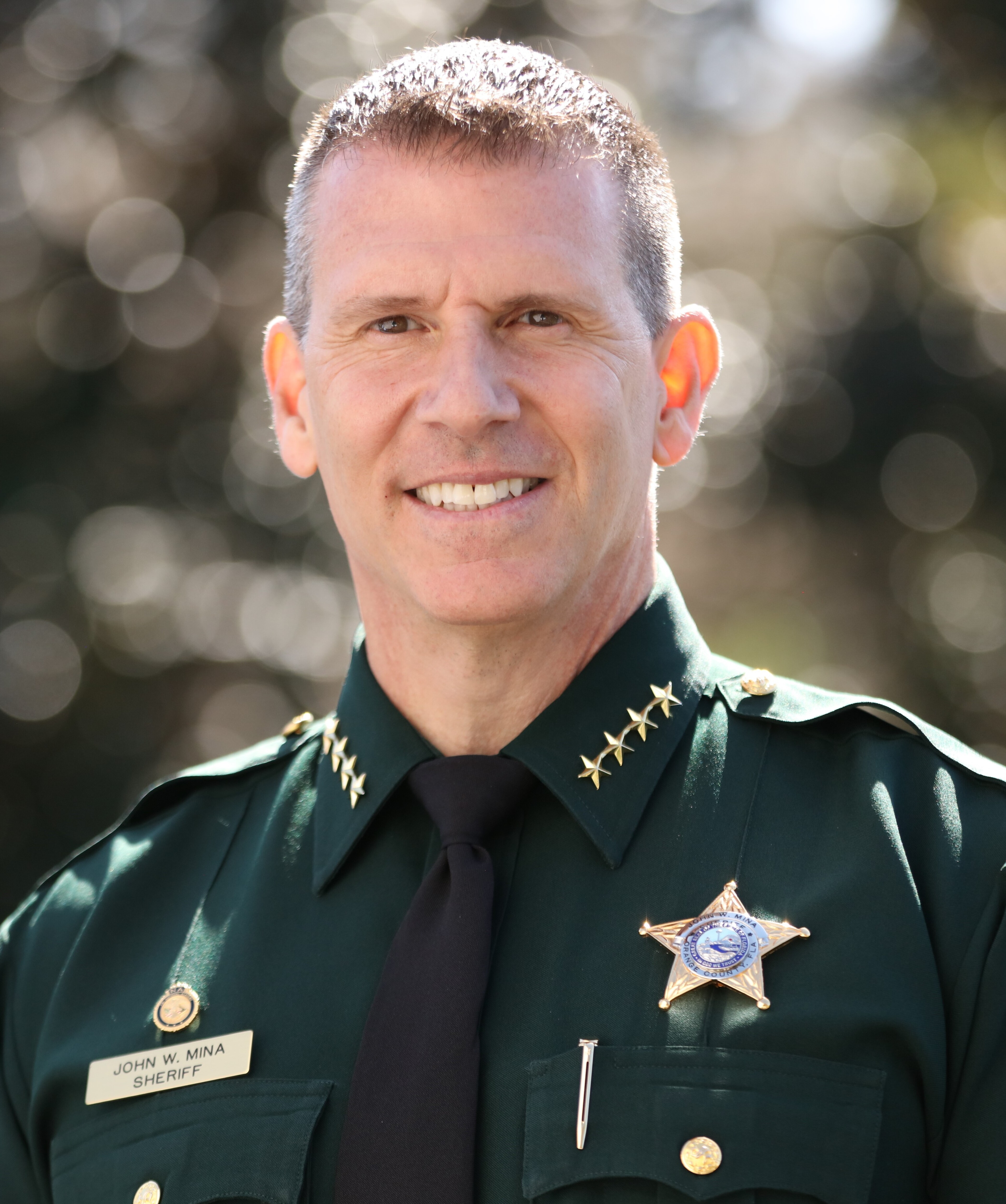
- Incumbent; John Mina since December 4, 2018
- Style: Sheriff (informal); The Honorable (formal)
- Type: Sheriff
- Nominator: Direct election
- Term length: 4 years; renewable
- Constituting instrument: Constitution of Florida
- Website: Official website

List of Orange County sheriffs:

- Walter Gallagher
- Kevin Beary
- Jerry Demings
- John Mina

== See also ==
- List of U.S. state and local law enforcement agencies
- County sheriff (Florida)
