= Kevin Beary =

American sheriff

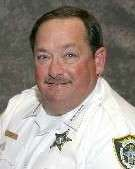

27th Sheriff of Orange County
- In office 1993–2009
- Preceded by: Walter Gallagher
- Succeeded by: Jerry Demings

Personal details
- Born: May 12, 1957 (age 69) Buffalo, New York, U.S.
- Party: Republican (former); Independent
- Spouse: Rebekah
- Children: 4
- Education: Liberty University; University of Central Florida

Kevin Beary (born May 12, 1957) was Sheriff from 1993 to 2009 of Orange County, Florida, United States, heading the Orange County Sheriff's Office, one of the largest law enforcement bodies in the Southeastern United States.

== Biography ==
Beary is the son of former University of Central Florida Police Chief Ray Beary, and the brother of Police Chief Richard Beary. His educational background includes a bachelor's degree from Liberty University and a master's degree in criminal justice from the University of Central Florida.

He was first elected in 1992 as a Republican. After election to his fourth term, he changed his party affiliation to Independent.

After Beary's election in 1992, Marianne Scholer, a former top-ranking woman in the Orange County Sheriff's Office was demoted and reclassified from major to lieutenant. She accused Sheriff Kevin Beary of sexual discrimination and filed a lawsuit which was settled in 1995 against a payment of $76,250.

In 2005, Beary had his aides use driver's license records to find the address of a journalist at the Orlando Sentinel who wrote an article critical of him, so that he could write her a letter in response. This was a violation of the Driver's Privacy Protection Act of 1994.

In 2004 and 2005, Beary was accused of corruption by a former subordinate turned political rival in the 2004 sheriff's race and a local television news station. This resulted in an audit of homeland security spending by his department. Beary was later cleared of any wrongdoing by a Florida Department of Law Enforcement investigation. On April 20, 2007 the Florida Ethics Commission found probable cause to believe that Beary violated Florida ethics laws as a result of his involvement in his homeland security business and filed four counts against him. Beary was prosecuted by the Florida Attorney General's Office and was to face trial on October 24, 2007 before a State of Florida Division of Administrative Hearings Judge on Case # 07-001820EC where Beary could have faced penalties up to removal from office. In 2009 Beary pleaded guilty to violating Florida ethics laws. He was fined a total of $20,000 and ordered to have no business relationship with the company he started using tax dollars and public employees for three years and given a public reprimand and censure by the Governor of Florida.

Beary did not run for reelection in 2008, instead endorsing Democratic candidate Jerry Demings. Demings won the election, and took over from Beary on January 5, 2009.

== Awards ==
In June 2003, Sheriff Beary was named Sheriff of the Year by the National Sheriffs' Association. In 2002 he received the Professional Achievement Award from the University of Central Florida. In 2001 he was given the local Hispanic Community Award. In 2000 he received the local Police Athletic League Award. He is also the recipient of the Silver Beaver Award from the Central Florida Council of the Boy Scouts of America. In 1996 he was recognized by the National Organization of Black Law Enforcement Officers. The local National Rifle Association chose him as their Law Enforcement Officer of the Year.

== Appointments ==
Beary was appointed by (former) Governor Jeb Bush to co-chair the Florida Domestic Security Task Force (Region V) on terrorism.

He served on the FBI's Executive Advisory Team for Homeland Security. Beary was president of the Major County Sheriff's Association, Central Florida Criminal Justice Association and the Florida SWAT Association. He serves on the D.A.R.E. America Operations Advisory Committee and is past chairman of the National Police Board of G.R.E.A.T. (Gang Resistance Education and Training). Beary was selected by the American Society for Industrial Security as a member of the Society's International Standing Council on Global Terrorism.
