= Stephanie Murphy =

American politician (born 1978)

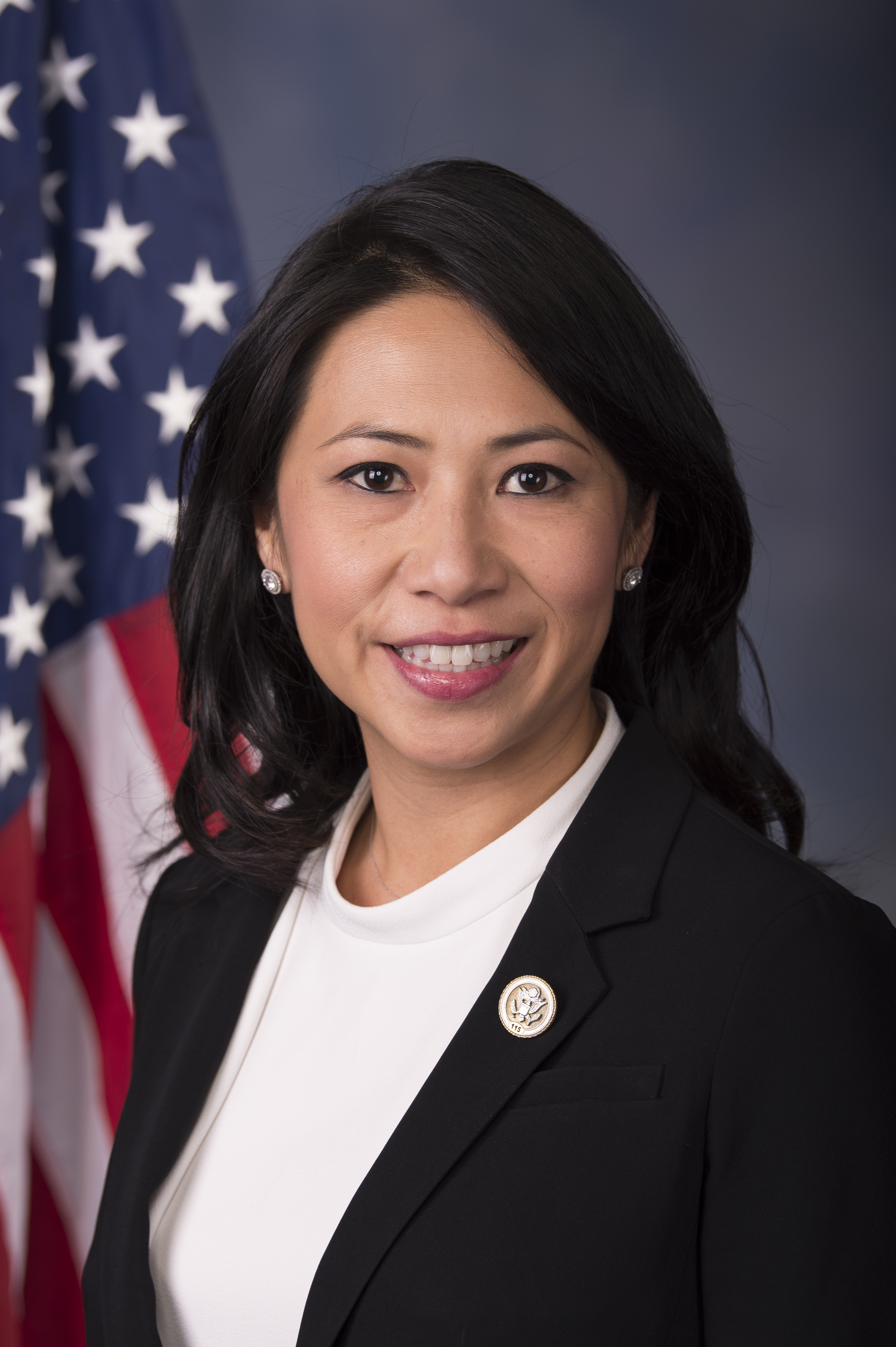
- Official portrait, 2017

Member of the U.S. House of Representatives from Florida's 7th district
- In office January 3, 2017 – January 3, 2023
- Preceded by: John Mica
- Succeeded by: Cory Mills

Personal details
- Born: Đặng Thị Ngọc Dung; September 16, 1978 (age 48) Ho Chi Minh City, Vietnam
- Party: Democratic (2016–present)
- Other political affiliations: Independent (before 2016)
- Spouse: Sean Murphy
- Children: 2
- Education: College of William and Mary (BA); Georgetown University (MS)
- Murphy's voice Murphy on the political status of Puerto Rico. Recorded November 17, 2020.

Stephanie Murphy (born Đặng Thị Ngọc Dung, September 16, 1978) is a Vietnamese-born American politician, businesswoman, former educator, and former national security analyst who served as the U.S. representative for Florida's 7th congressional district from 2017 to 2023. A member of the Democratic Party, she defeated 12-term incumbent Republican John Mica in 2016. Her district included much of downtown and northern Orlando, as well as all of Winter Park, Maitland, Sanford, and Altamonte Springs.

Murphy was born in 1978 in Ho Chi Minh City, Vietnam, before leaving the country with her family in 1979. After growing up in Northern Virginia, Murphy attended the College of William & Mary and Georgetown University. Before her election to Congress, she worked as a national security specialist at the United States Department of Defense, an executive at Sungate Capital, and a business professor at Rollins College. Murphy became the first Vietnamese-American woman, first Vietnamese-American Democrat, and the second Vietnamese-American overall (after South Vietnam-born Republican Joseph Cao of Louisiana) to be elected to Congress. Rather than seeking re-election to a fourth term, she retired from Congress in 2022.

On July 9, 2025, Murphy announced her candidacy for mayor of Orange County in 2026. However, she was eliminated in the primary election on August 18, 2026.

== Early life and education ==
Stephanie Murphy was born on September 16, 1978, in Ho Chi Minh City, Vietnam. Her family fled Communist-controlled Vietnam in 1979 by boat when she was six months old. Their boat ran out of fuel and they were rescued by the United States Navy at sea. They settled in Northern Virginia, where she grew up.

With the help of Pell Grants and student loans, Murphy attended the College of William & Mary, graduating with a Bachelor of Arts degree in economics. She then went to Georgetown University, from which she received a Master of Science in Foreign Service degree.

== Pre-congressional career ==
After the September 11 attacks, Murphy went to work for the United States Department of Defense as a national security specialist. For her service, she received the Secretary of Defense Exceptional Civilian Service Award. She worked as an executive on investment efforts and government affairs initiatives at Sungate Capital in Winter Park, Florida, and as a business professor at Rollins College.

In 2013, the company 3N2 employed Murphy to lead a design team for new women's softball pants; she is listed in patent records as an inventor of "NuFit Knickers". In 2018 Murphy came under criticism after it was revealed that her husband's company has the pants and other sports gear made in China.

== U.S. House of Representatives ==
=== Elections ===
==== 2016 ====
Murphy declared her candidacy for the United States House of Representatives for Florida's 7th congressional district in the 2016 elections. She ran against 12-term incumbent Republican John Mica in the November 8 general election. She was endorsed by President Barack Obama, Vice President Joe Biden, and former congresswoman Gabby Giffords. Murphy defeated Mica with 51% of the vote. She is the second Vietnamese-American, after Joseph Cao, to be elected to the United States Congress, and the first Vietnamese-American woman to do so.

Murphy ran in a district that was somewhat bluer than its predecessor after a court-ordered mid-decade redistricting. The old 7th had been a marginal district, even though Mica had won it twice without serious difficulty (he represented a more Republican St. Augustine/Daytona Beach/Orlando district from 1993 to 2013). Mitt Romney won it over Barack Obama in 2012, with 51% of the vote. In contrast, had the redrawn 7th existed in 2012, Obama would have won it with 49.4%.

After meeting with President Trump in September 2017, Murphy said that she and fellow Democrats could work with him.

==== 2018 ====
According to political commentators, Murphy faced the challenge of representing an evenly divided district. "Of the three freshman Democrats from Central Florida, which include U.S. Reps. Val Demings, D-Orlando, and Darren Soto, D-Kissimmee, Murphy faces the toughest race for re-election," the Orlando Sentinel wrote on January 2, 2018. "I think she has one of the toughest districts in the country," said Susan MacManus, a political science professor at the University of South Florida. "It's very difficult to please everybody in a swing district, and that's why it's so challenging."

Murphy defeated Republican state Representative Mike Miller with 57.6% of the vote,

==== 2020 ====
Murphy was reelected with 55.34% of the vote, defeating Republican Leo Valentín.

=== Tenure ===
Murphy was sworn into office on January 3, 2017. She has urged the Federal Bureau of Investigation to investigate various bomb threats against Jewish facilities. She joined the Blue Dog Coalition in the 115th U.S. Congress, and in December 2018 was named one of three co-chairs, handling administration, for the 116th U.S. Congress.

With the Democrats winning a majority in the House in 2018, Murphy was named to the Ways and Means Committee.

In March 2019, Murphy endorsed Beto O'Rourke in the 2020 Democratic party presidential primaries. After O'Rourke withdrew from the race, Murphy endorsed Michael Bloomberg in January 2020, becoming his campaign's national co-chair. After Bloomberg withdrew in March 2020, Murphy endorsed Joe Biden.

On December 20, 2021, Murphy announced on Twitter that she would not seek reelection to a fourth term, writing, "I've decided not to seek another term in Congress. Serving Central Florida has been the honor of my life, but it's also been incredibly challenging for my family and me." There was speculation that her decision was made because Republicans in the state legislature would redraw her into an unwinnable district, but the decision came several months before new maps were approved in May 2022.

=== Investigation into the January 6 attack on the Capitol ===
On July 1, 2021, Murphy was one of seven Democrats Speaker Nancy Pelosi appointed to the United States House Select Committee on the January 6 Attack. In a statement following the announcement, Murphy pledged "to fulfill this solemn responsibility to the best of my ability. My goal is simple and straightforward: to find the truth of what happened, and why it happened, so we can ensure that it never happens again. I will follow the facts wherever, and to whomever, they lead—without preconceived conclusions and through a strictly non-partisan lens." She concluded her statement: "To see the citadel of American democracy assaulted is a reminder that our democracy is not self-sustaining. It needs to be preserved and protected by American patriots of every political stripe.”

On July 12, 2022, Murphy co-led the Select Committee's seventh public hearing with Representative Jamie Raskin. In her opening statement, she said, "We will show some of the coordination that occurred between the White House and members of Congress as it relates to January 6th. And some of these members of Congress would later seek pardons." The hearing also focused on the role the far-right extremist groups Proud Boys and Oath Keepers played in organizing the attack. Trump's December 19, 2020, tweet "Big protest in D.C. on January 6th. Be there, will be wild!" and its spread to his supporters was also discussed. To show the impact, the committee played audio recordings of its interview with an anonymous Twitter employee who worked from 2020 to 2021 and was on the team responsible for the platform's content moderation policies. The employee said the tweet served "as a call to action, and in some cases as a call to arms" to Trump's supporters.

In Murphy's closing statement, she said: "Our committee’s overriding objective is to fight fiction with facts. To create a full account for the American people and for the historical record. To tell the truth of what happened and why it happened. To make recommendations so it never happens again. To defend our democracy. To me, there is nothing more patriotic than that."

=== Committee assignments ===
- Committee on Ways and Means
  - Subcommittee on Trade
  - Subcommittee on Worker and Family Support
- Committee on Armed Services
  - Subcommittee on Intelligence & Special Operations, Vice Chair
  - Subcommittee on Tactical Air & Land Forces
- Select Committee on the January 6 Attack

=== Caucus memberships ===
- Blue Dog Coalition
- New Democrat Coalition
- Problem Solvers Caucus
- Climate Solutions Caucus
- Congressional Asian Pacific American Caucus
- Future Forum

=== Leadership in the 117th Congress ===
- Chief Deputy Whip
- Blue Dog Coalition, Communications Co-Chair
- Future Forum, Chair Emeritus

=== Leadership in the 116th Congress ===
- Blue Dog Coalition, Administration Co-Chair
- Future Forum, Chair

== Post-congressional career ==
On July 9, 2025, Murphy announced she would run for mayor of Orange County, Florida. She joined a field of three other candidates. She failed to progress to the runoff election on August 18, 2026 after finishing third place in the primary election.

== Political positions ==
Murphy is a Blue Dog Democrat.

=== Infrastructure ===
In 2021, Murphy was one of nine Democrats who opted not to support the Build Back Better Act unless the House first voted on the Infrastructure Investment and Jobs Act.

=== Healthcare ===
Murphy voted against allowing Medicare to negotiate the prices of prescription medications in the Ways and Means Committee.

=== Economy and COVID-19 relief ===
Murphy is a self-identified capitalist. She supports a balanced budget amendment to the U.S. constitution, which would prohibit the government from spending more than it takes in on a given year. She views growing federal budget deficits as "major threats to the economy, the future health of America, and national security."

In an April 2020 conference call with business executives and lobbyists, Murphy expressed support for a lobbyist-led effort to reverse a ban in the original CARES Act that blocked business advocacy and lobbying groups from participating in the taxpayer-funded Paycheck Protection Program. The effort included a request to be eligible for an additional $25 billion in government funds for canceled events and other lost revenue from the pandemic.

Murphy was part of an effort by some Republicans and Democrats on Capitol Hill to use the coronavirus outbreak to press Trump to remove tariffs on billions of dollars' worth of Chinese goods and imported steel and aluminum. After the administration rejected the requests, she and Representative Joe Cunningham sent House Speaker Nancy Pelosi a letter requesting that she include a suspension of the tariffs in the COVID-19 relief package and mandate that the government refund to businesses the tariffs already paid on imported Chinese goods and imported steel and aluminum.

Murphy introduced a bill to make it easier for small business owners to obtain low-interest loans. It passed the House. She also co-sponsored a law, passed and signed by Trump, that ensures that small businesses will receive a share of federal government contracts.

=== Immigration ===
Murphy supports comprehensive immigration reform to fix what she characterizes as a broken system with one that is "consistent with American values." She supports a pathway to legal status for undocumented immigrants and reforms to the visa system to focus on economic development. To demonstrate her support for immigration reform, she posted online a picture of herself wearing an "I Am An Immigrant" t-shirt along with the message, "#IAmAnImmigrant and proud of it. Our nation's diversity is its strength. Opportunity and freedom keep the American dream alive."

Murphy was one of 24 House Democrats to vote for Kate's Law, which proposes to increase the penalties for those who have been deported or removed from the U.S. and are apprehended reentering the country.

Murphy opposed Trump's executive order to temporarily ban entry into the U.S. by citizens of six Muslim-majority countries, North Korea and Venezuela. "I strongly oppose the President's executive orders on refugees, which violate fundamental American values and undermine our national security," she said. "We must work in a bipartisan manner to strengthen our refugee policy in a way that keeps us secure AND upholds our values."

=== Gun control ===
Murphy decided to run for office when incumbent Republican John Mica accepted a campaign contribution from the National Rifle Association of America (NRA) two days after the Pulse nightclub shooting in Orlando, Florida (the 7th congressional district used to include much of Orlando). She won office with the support of gun-control groups, such as Americans for Responsible Solutions (later merged into Giffords Law Center to Prevent Gun Violence) and the Pride Fund to End Gun Violence, which formed after the Pulse shooting. Murphy supports universal background checks, as well as prohibiting those on the No Fly List from purchasing firearms. She has said, "We should protect the Second Amendment rights of law-abiding gun owners, but we should also protect our communities by passing commonsense gun laws."

In 2017, Murphy introduced into the House the "Gun Violence Research Act", which was designed to repeal the 1996 Dickey Amendment, a federal ban on the use of federal funds to fund gun-violence research. She said the ban on gun-violence research was "un-American to its core." After the 2018 Stoneman Douglas High School shooting in Parkland, Florida, several Republican Congress members indicated that they supported the Gun Violence Research Act, and Murphy ultimately spoke to Vice President Mike Pence, which she credits with helping the bill pass as an amendment to a budget bill that year. The first grants for studies were issued in October 2020. In March 2018, Murphy said that gun control might be approaching "a tipping point" because young people "had to grow up where they don't know anything but school mass shootings. They're sick and tired of it, and they're activating."

=== Impeachments of Donald Trump ===
On December 18, 2019, Murphy voted for both articles of impeachment against Trump.

On January 7, 2021, Murphy called for Trump to be removed from office under the 25th amendment of the U.S. Constitution. She voted in favor of Trump's second impeachment on January 13, 2021.

=== Military ===
Murphy was one of 8 Democrats to oppose a House resolution limiting Trump's military actions against Iran without congressional approval.

=== National security ===
In the aftermath of the attack on the Capitol, Murphy proposed to deny security clearances to QAnon believers.

In a December 2020 op-ed in the Tampa Bay Times, Murphy characterized climate change as a "national security threat and economic opportunity" for Florida.

=== Police reform ===
Murphy co-sponsored the George Floyd Justice in Policing Act, a sweeping civil rights and police reform bill that would limit legal protections for police from individual lawsuits, ban chokeholds, create a national registry of police misconduct, and grant the Department of Justice more power to investigate local police departments for potential misconduct, among a number of other provisions.

Murphy authored a statement from the Blue Dog Caucus calling for "swift and systematic change" and calling on Republicans to join them in pursuing police reform.

=== Trade ===
Murphy considers herself a pro-trade Democrat, saying in a speech before the National Foreign Trade Council Foundation, "...I don’t support free trade. That’s a common term, but a misnomer—because it suggests unfettered trade or a free-for-all. I believe trade in goods and services is vital to advancing America’s economic and security interests. I believe protectionist measures are more likely to result in self-harm than self-preservation. I support a trading system that is rules-based. These rules should help ensure U.S. companies rise or fall on their own merits, and don’t have to compete on an unfair playing field with foreign-based companies that mistreat workers, pollute the environment, steal intellectual property, or receive excessive government support."

In February 2022, Murphy was the only House Democrat to vote against the America COMPETES Act of 2022, a bill primarily focused on encouraging and strengthening American scientific and technological innovation and R&D. Murphy said that while she supported many elements of the bill, "the trade section of the bill includes problematic, poorly-vetted provisions and excludes sensible, bipartisan provisions that were part of the Senate-passed version of the bill" according to Murphy. She said the bill "does more to limit trade than to enhance trade, even though expanded trade helps far more American workers than it hurts, reduces the prices that American consumers pay for goods and services, and is a powerful weapon in our strategic competition with China."

=== Big Tech ===
In 2022, Murphy was one of 16 Democrats to vote against the Merger Filing Fee Modernization Act of 2022, an antitrust package that would crack down on corporations for anti-competitive behavior.

== Personal life ==
Murphy and her husband, Sean, have two children. She is a Protestant Christian.

== See also ==
- List of Asian Americans and Pacific Islands Americans in the United States Congress
- List of Vietnamese Americans
- Women in the United States House of Representatives

U.S. House of Representatives
Preceded by John Mica	Member of the U.S. House of Representatives from Florida's 7th congressional district 2017–2023	Succeeded by Cory Mills
Party political offices
Preceded by Jim Costa	Chair of the Blue Dog Coalition for Administration; 2019–2023; Served alongside: Lou Correa, Tom O'Halleran (Communications); Tom O'Halleran, Ed Case (Policy)	Succeeded by Jared Golden as Chair of the Blue Dog Coalition for Administration and Communications
U.S. order of precedence (ceremonial)
Preceded by Al Lawson as Former U.S. Representative	Order of precedence of the United States as Former U.S. Representative	Succeeded by Mike Waltz as Former U.S. Representative
