= 2022 Orange County, Florida mayoral election =

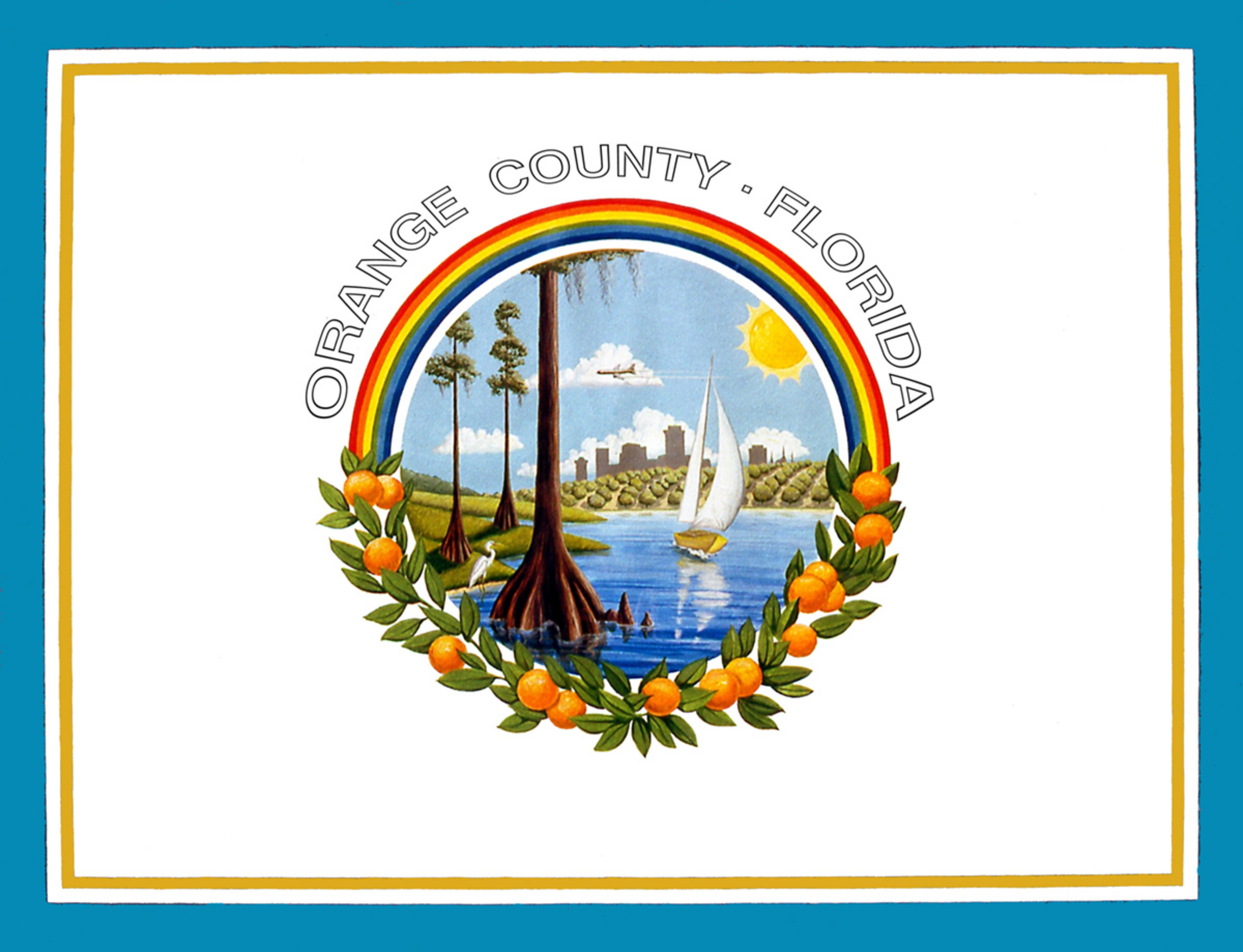
- August 23, 2022; Officially nonpartisan
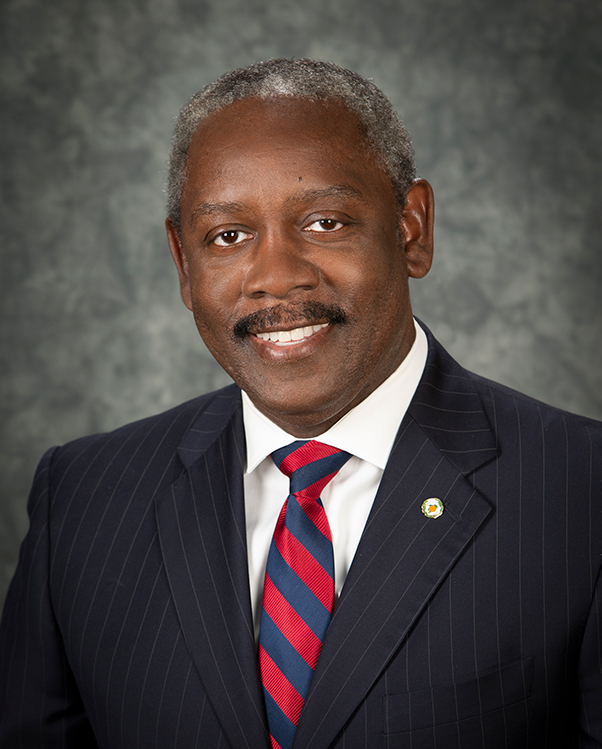

Candidate	Jerry Demings	Chris Messina
Party	Democratic	Republican
Popular vote	110,937	39,769
Percentage	60.05%	21.54%
Candidate	Kelly Semrad	Tony Sabb
Party	Democratic	Republican
Popular vote	17,242	16,781
Percentage	9.33%	9.08%
- Results by precinct Demings: 40–50% 50–60% 60–70% 70–80% 80–90% >90% Messina: 30–40% 40–50% 50–60% Sabb: >90% No votes
Mayor before election
Jerry Demings
Democratic
Elected mayor
Jerry Demings
Democratic

The 2022 Orange County, Florida, mayoral election was held on August 23, 2022, to elect the mayor of Orange County, Florida. Incumbent Jerry Demings was first elected in 2018, and was re-elected in 2022 with 60.05%. Since Demings won a majority in the first round, a runoff election was not needed.

The election was officially nonpartisan, but most candidates were affiliated with political parties, and Demings is a registered Democrat.

== Candidates ==
=== Elected ===
- Jerry Demings, incumbent mayor

=== Eliminated in Primary ===
- Chris Messina, businessman
- Tony Sabb, retired Army colonel
- Kelly Semrad, University of Central Florida associate professor

== Endorsements ==
Jerry Demings

U.S. representatives

- Val Demings, U.S. Representative from Florida's 10th congressional district (2017–2023) (his wife)

Newspapers and other media

- Orlando Sentinel

Organizations

- Central Florida Hotel and Lodging Association

== Results ==
2022 Orange County, Florida mayoral election
Party	Candidate	Votes	%
Nonpartisan	Jerry Demings	110,973	60.05
Nonpartisan	Chris Messina	39,796	21.54
Nonpartisan	Kelly Semrad	17,242	9.33
Nonpartisan	Tony Sabb	16,781	9.08
Total votes		184,792	100.00

== See also ==
- 2010 Orange County, Florida mayoral election
