= Webster University Orlando =

University in Florida, United States

Coordinates: 28.540675°N 81.385267°W

- Established: 1991; 35 years ago
- Parent institution: Webster University
- Director: Donavan Outtan
- Location: 501 W. Church Street, Orlando, Florida, 32805, Orlando (Downtown), Florida
- Nickname: Gorloks
- Mascot: Gorlok

Webster University Orlando is a university campus located in downtown Orlando, Florida. This campus location is an extended campus of Webster University main campus in St. Louis, Missouri.

Previously, Webster University operated two extended campus locations in the Orlando metro area; one in Longwood and one near Williamsburg. In June 2016, those two campus location resources were combined into one more robust campus in downtown Orlando near the Amway Center. Currently, they have campuses positioned strategically across the U.S., including Florida.

== Academic programs ==
- Master of Business Administration
- Master of Health Administration
- MS in Finance
- MA in Counseling
- MS in Cybersecurity
- MA in Human Resources Management
- MA in Human Services
- MA in Information Technology Management
- MA in Management and Leadership
- Certificate in Project Management
- Certificate in Global Business
- Certificate in Government Contracting
- Certificate in Cybersecurity Threat Detection
