= Jerry Demings =

American politician (born 1959)

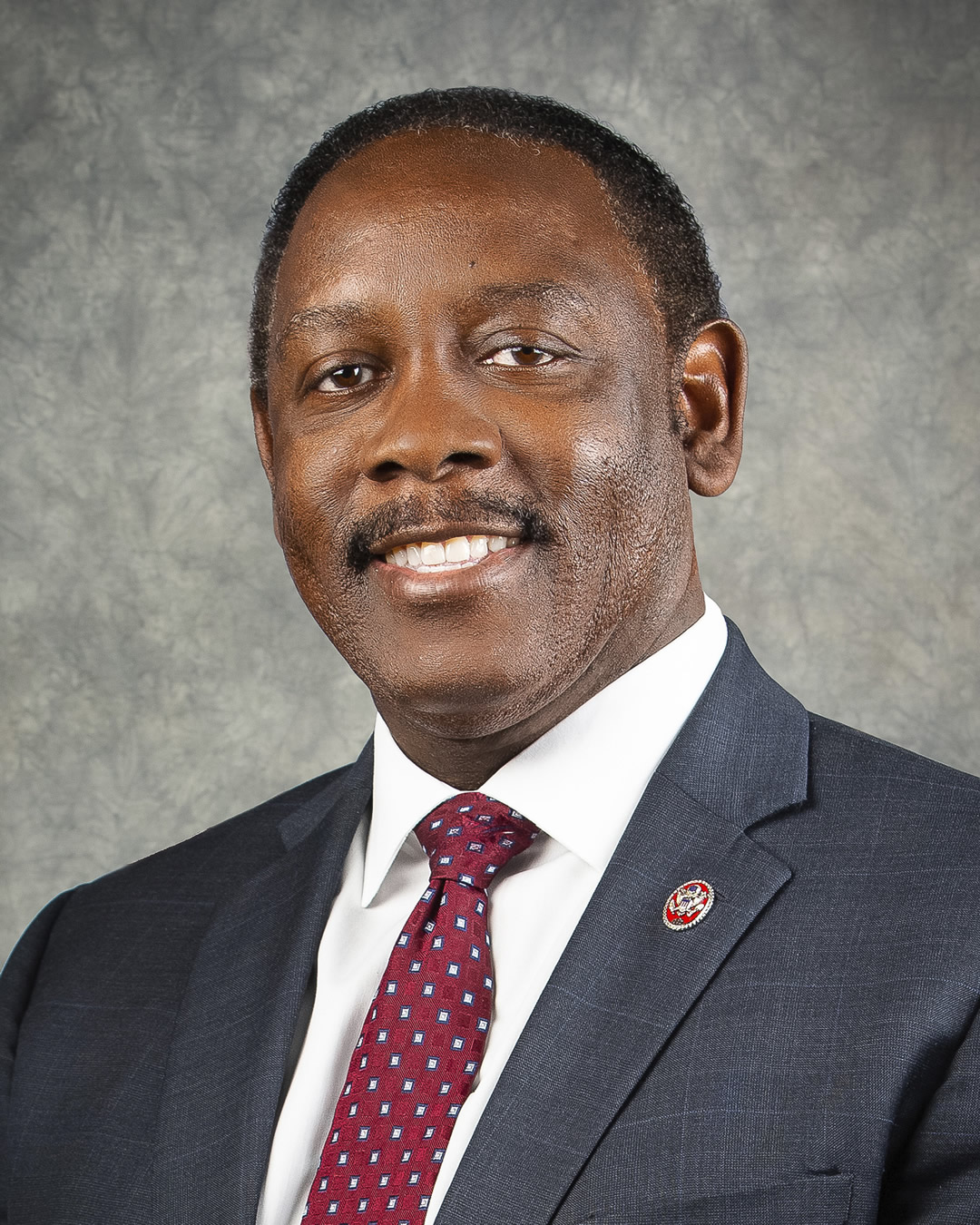
- Official portrait, 2025

5th Mayor of Orange County
- Incumbent
- Assumed office December 4, 2018
- Preceded by: Teresa Jacobs

28th Sheriff of Orange County
- In office January 6, 2009 – December 4, 2018
- Preceded by: Kevin Beary
- Succeeded by: John Mina

Chief of the Orlando Police Department
- In office 1998–2002
- Mayor: Glenda Hood
- Preceded by: Bill Kennedy
- Succeeded by: Michael McCoy

Personal details
- Born: Jerry L. Demings; June 12, 1959 (age 67) Orlando, Florida, U.S.
- Party: Democratic
- Spouse: Val Butler (m. 1988)
- Children: 3
- Education: Florida State University (BS); Everest College (MBA)
- Website: jerrydemingsforgovernor.org

Jerry L. Demings (born June 12, 1959) is an American politician and former law enforcement officer serving as the fifth mayor of Orange County, Florida since 2018. He is the first African American to hold the position. A member of the Democratic Party, he served as sheriff of Orange County from 2009 to 2018 and as chief of the Orlando Police Department from 1998 to 2002.

Born and raised in Orlando, Florida, Demings graduated from Florida State University with a bachelor's degree in finance in 1980. After a brief career in accounting, he joined the Orlando Police Department in 1981 and was promoted through the ranks until his appointment as chief of police in 1998, becoming the first African American to hold the post. In 2008, Demings was elected sheriff of Orange County and was the first African American elected countywide. His tenure coincided with the 2016 Orlando Pulse Nightclub massacre; then the deadliest terrorist attack in the United States since the September 11 attacks and the second deadliest mass shooting in U.S. history. He was re-elected in 2012 and 2016.

Due to Florida's resign-to-run laws, Demings resigned as sheriff to run for county mayor in 2018, and won the August primary with 62 percent of the vote; avoiding the need for a runoff election. Demings became the first Democrat to be elected as Orange County mayor since Linda Chapin's re-election in 1994. He was re-elected in 2022 with 61 percent of the vote. He filed paperwork to run for governor of Florida in the 2026 election on November 3, 2025.

Demings is married to Val Demings, a former U.S. representative and the 2022 Democratic nominee for U.S. senator from Florida.

== Early life and education ==
Demings was born and raised in Orlando, Florida, the youngest of five children, although he has a twin brother who is only minutes older. His father was a taxi driver and his mother a maid. One of his brothers died of an illness related to drug addiction. He graduated from Jones High School in Orlando and later attended Florida State University and Everest College, earning a bachelor's degree in finance and a master's degree in business administration. He also has a certificate of completion from Harvard University's Kennedy School, FBI National Academy and the FBI National Executive Institute.

== Career ==
Demings worked as an accountant before beginning a career in law enforcement. Demings joined the Orlando Police Department in 1981 after certification from the J. C. Stone Memorial Police Academy. He worked in the department as deputy chief of the Investigative Services Bureau before he became its first African-American police chief in 1998, serving until his retirement after 21 years with the department in 2002. In 2002, he was named director of Public Safety for Orange County, a position in which he served until 2008. In 2008, Demings ran as the Democratic candidate for sheriff of Orange County, Florida, the chief law enforcement officer of the county. He defeated his Republican challenger John B. Tegg III, and became the first African-American to serve in the post. Demings was re-elected in 2012, and again in 2016. In July 2016, Demings was elected as president of the Florida Sheriffs' Association.

When Demings was elected county sheriff in 2008, his wife, Val Demings, held his former job as chief of the Orlando Police Department. Demings' Republican opponent in the sheriff's race, John Tegg, alleged that his election would create a conflict of interest.

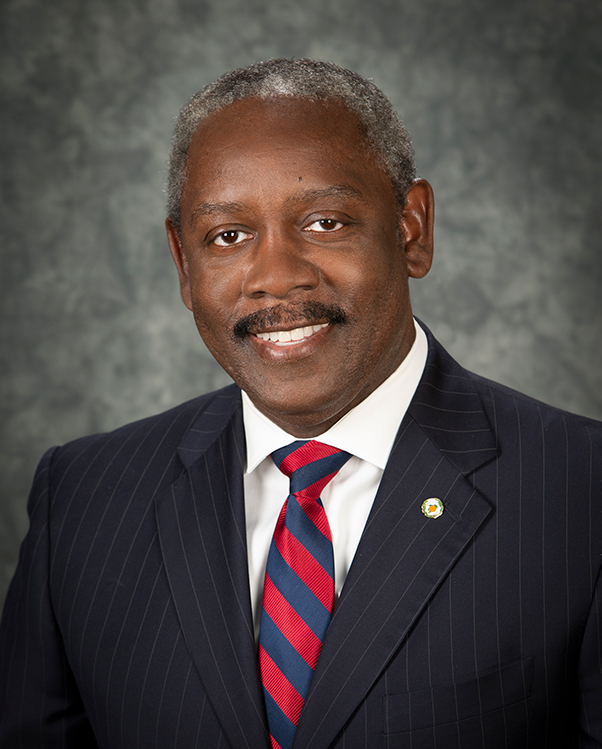
Demings' official mayoral portrait during his first term, 2018

In April 2022, Demings spoke out against the repeal of the Reedy Creek Improvement Act, saying that the Florida legislature had not "adequately contemplated the ramifications" and said it would put an "undue burden" on taxpayers.

Facing the threat of being removed from office by Governor Ron DeSantis in August 2025, Demings signed an addendum allowing Orange County correctional officers to transport immigrant detainees to Immigration and Customs Enforcement (ICE) facilities, including Alligator Alcatraz.

=== Investigations ===
After a whistleblower came forward in August 2025, the Florida Department of Financial Services and Florida Department of Government Efficiency issued investigative subpoenas to 16 Orange County employees for the alleged cover-up of illegal DEI government spending. The chief financial officer of Florida, Blaise Ingoglia, also expressed interest in opening a criminal investigation after Orange County employees purportedly concealed spending reports during a 2025 Florida DOGE audit. Demings denied the allegations and described the investigations as "mean-spirited" and "politically motivated."

=== COVID-19 Public Health Policies, including Lawsuits ===
In 2021, Demings implemented a COVID-19 vaccination mandate for Orange County employees, initially threatening termination for noncompliance but later capping discipline for firefighters at written reprimands following negotiations with the firefighters' union. The policy drew opposition, including from Orange County Fire Rescue Battalion Chief Stephen Davis, who was terminated in October 2021 for refusing to issue reprimands to subordinates over vaccination status, citing concerns about inaccuracies in compliance lists and potential violations of exemptions. Davis's firing received attention from Governor Ron DeSantis, who criticized it and supported related legal challenges to local mandates. Davis later sued the county alleging wrongful termination, with appeals reaching the U.S. Court of Appeals for the Eleventh Circuit.

In 2024, Orange County Government under the leadership of Mayor Demings faced a federal lawsuit filed by a former employee, who worked as a security representative at the Orange County Convention Center (OCCC) identified herein as Joshua Crockett over alleged civil rights violations. In particular, Crockett alleged discrimination based on race, color, national origin, sex, religion, and disability, as well as retaliation and hostile work environment under Title VII, the Americans with Disabilities Act, and Section 1983. Of note, Crockett asserted Security Manager Isiah White Jr., a childhood friend of Demings, selectively enforced the EG2 Grooming Policy and retaliated against his religious practices as a follower of Yeshua HaMashiach, including a 2022 confrontation where Demings allegedly dismissed Title VII concerns with laughter. In summary, the case was decided on the merits in Florida’s Division of Administrative Hearings against the Petitioner in the case, identified herein as Joshua Crockett which was adopted in Toto by the Florida Commission on Human Relations. As of now, the case is on appeal before Florida’s First District Court of Appeals. This case, which intersects with Demings’ tenure as mayor, involves allegations of indifference to constitutional rights and remains pending as of November 12, 2025. In conclusion, Mayor Demings’ actions during the COVID-19 pandemic have been upheld by ALJ Bruce Culpepper with Florida’s Division of Administrative Hearings (DOAH). In other words, Crockett failed to substantiate his allegations in the court of law.

== Personal life ==
Demings is married to former U.S. representative Val Demings, whom he met during his early years with the Orlando Police Department. He was a detective and she was a first-year police officer when they both worked a juvenile go-kart-accident case. They married in 1988 and have three children along with five grandchildren. His wife served as a captain in the police department while he was chief and later went on to become the first female police chief of the Orlando Police Department, serving from 2007 to 2011. She was elected to the United States House of Representatives in 2016. Demings wrote and published a book, Believe: Faith, Truth and the Courage to Lead which details his response to the 2016 Orlando Pulse Nightclub massacre and his leadership as county mayor during the COVID-19 pandemic, in August 2025.

Demings is also a member of Omega Psi Phi fraternity.

In June 2026, Demings announced that he was diagnosed with prostate cancer, later at AdventHealth Celebration it was removed by Vipul Patel on July 28.

Political offices
Preceded by Teresa Jacobs	Mayor of Orange County; 2018–present	Incumbent
