= Val Demings =

American politician (born 1957)

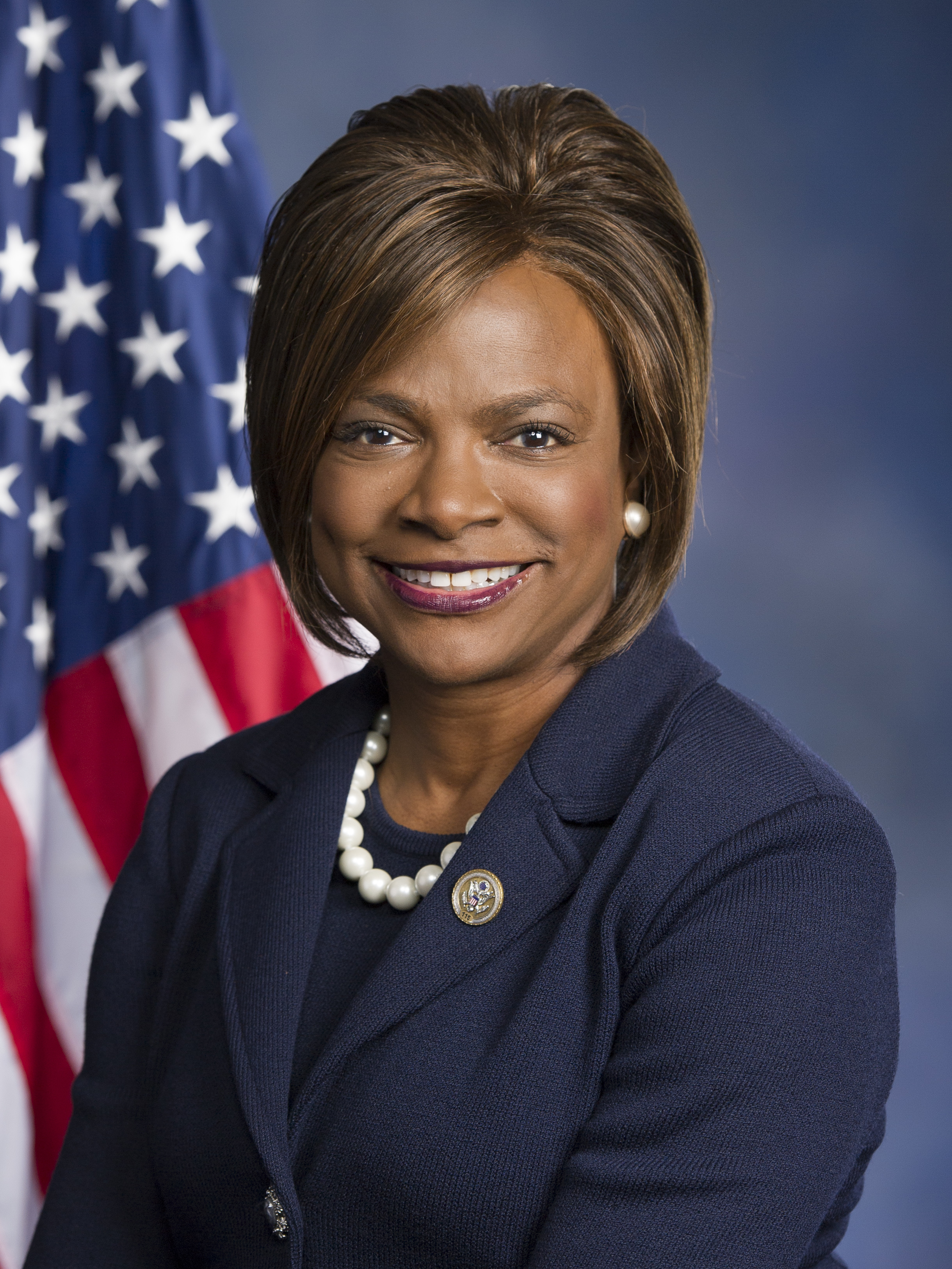
- Official portrait, 2017

Member of the U.S. House of Representatives from Florida's 10th district
- In office January 3, 2017 – January 3, 2023
- Preceded by: Daniel Webster
- Succeeded by: Maxwell Frost

Chief of the Orlando Police Department
- In office December 16, 2007 – June 1, 2011
- Preceded by: Michael McCoy
- Succeeded by: Paul Rooney

Personal details
- Born: Valdez Venita Butler; March 12, 1957 (age 69) Jacksonville, Florida, U.S.
- Party: Democratic
- Spouse: Jerry Demings (m. 1988)
- Children: 3
- Education: Florida State University (BS); Webster University, Orlando (MPA)
- Police career
- Department: Orlando Police Department
- Service years: 1983–2011
- Rank: Chief

Valdez Venita Demings (née Butler; born March 12, 1957) is an American politician and former police officer who served as U.S. representative for Florida's 10th congressional district from 2017 to 2023. The district covered most of the western half of Orlando and includes much of the area around Orlando's resort parks. It includes many of Orlando's western suburbs, including Apopka and Winter Garden. From 2007 to 2011, Demings served as the first female chief of the Orlando Police Department, closing a 27-year career in law enforcement. She has also been first lady of Orange County, Florida, since December 4, 2018, when her husband Jerry Demings was sworn in as County Mayor.

Demings won the Democratic Party's nomination for U.S. Representative from Florida's 10th congressional district in 2012. After losing to Republican incumbent Daniel Webster, she won in 2016 after the State Supreme Court mandated redistricting statewide.

On January 15, 2020, House Speaker Nancy Pelosi selected Demings to serve as a House impeachment manager in the first Senate trial of President Donald Trump. In early August 2020, Demings was said to be one of the top contenders to be Joe Biden's vice-presidential running mate in the 2020 United States presidential election, along with Kamala Harris and Susan Rice. Instead of running for re-election in the House, she became the Democratic nominee in the 2022 United States Senate election in Florida, wherein she lost to Republican incumbent Marco Rubio.

In July 2024, President Joe Biden nominated Demings to serve as a member of the Board of Governors of the United States Postal Service. Her nomination expired at the end of the 118th United States Congress.

== Early life and education ==
Valdez Venita Butler was born on March 12, 1957, one of seven children born to a poor family; her father worked as a janitor, her mother as a maid. They lived in Mandarin, a neighborhood in Jacksonville, Florida. She attended segregated schools in the 1960s and graduated from Wolfson High School in 1975.

Demings became interested in a career in law enforcement after serving in the "school patrol" at Dupont Junior High School. She attended Florida State University, graduating with a degree in criminology in 1979. In 1996, Demings earned a master's degree in public administration from Webster University Orlando.

== Early career ==
After graduating from college, Demings worked as a state social worker in Jacksonville for 18 months.

In 1983, Demings applied for a job with the Orlando Police Department (OPD); her first assignment was on patrol on Orlando's west side. Demings was appointed chief of the Orlando Police Department in 2007, becoming the first woman to lead the department. From 2007 to 2011, she oversaw a 40% decrease in violent crime.

According to a 2015 article in The Atlantic, the Orlando Police Department "has a long record of excessive-force allegations, and a lack of transparency on the subject, dating back at least as far as Demings's time as chief." A 2008 Orlando Weekly exposé described the Orlando Police Department as "a place where rogue cops operate with impunity, and there's nothing anybody who finds himself at the wrong end of their short fuse can do about it." Demings responded with an op-ed in the Orlando Sentinel, writing, "Looking for a negative story in a police department is like looking for a prayer at church", adding, "It won't take long to find one." In the same op-ed, she cast doubt on video evidence that conflicts with officers' statements in excessive force cases, writing, "a few seconds (even of video) rarely capture the entire set of circumstances."

In 2009, she had her firearm, a Sig Sauer P226R, stolen from her department vehicle while parked at her home; she was issued a written censure. The firearm has not been recovered.

Demings retired from her position as chief of OPD effective June 1, 2011, after serving with the OPD for 27 years.

== U.S. House of Representatives ==
=== Elections ===
==== 2016 ====
Demings was the Democratic nominee for the United States House of Representatives in Florida's 10th congressional district in the 2012 elections. She faced freshman Republican Daniel Webster in a district that had been made slightly more Republican than its predecessor in 2010. Demings narrowly lost, taking 48% of the vote to Webster's 51%.

Democrats attempted to recruit Demings to run against Webster again in 2014. She decided to run for mayor of Orange County, Florida, against Teresa Jacobs, instead, but dropped out of the mayoral race on May 20, 2014.

In 2015, Demings announced her candidacy for the 10th district seat after a court-ordered redistricting made the 10th significantly more Democratic ahead of the 2016 elections. Webster concluded the new 10th was unwinnable, and ran for reelection in the nearby 11th district.

Demings won the Democratic nomination on August 30 and the general election in November with 65% of the vote. She is the third Democrat to win this Orlando-based district since its creation in 1973 (it was numbered as the 5th from 1973 to 1993, the 8th from 1993 to 2013, and has been the 10th since 2013).

==== 2018 ====
In her 2018 reelection campaign, Demings was unopposed for a second term.

==== 2020 ====
On May 21, 2020, Demings confirmed she was on "the shortlist" to be Joe Biden's vice presidential nominee for the 2020 presidential election. She said she would accept the role if offered. Some critics, including Black Lives Matter activists, criticized her record as Orlando police chief. Kamala Harris was announced as Biden's running mate on August 11, 2020. In November 2020, Demings was named a candidate for United States Secretary of Homeland Security in the Biden administration.

=== Tenure ===
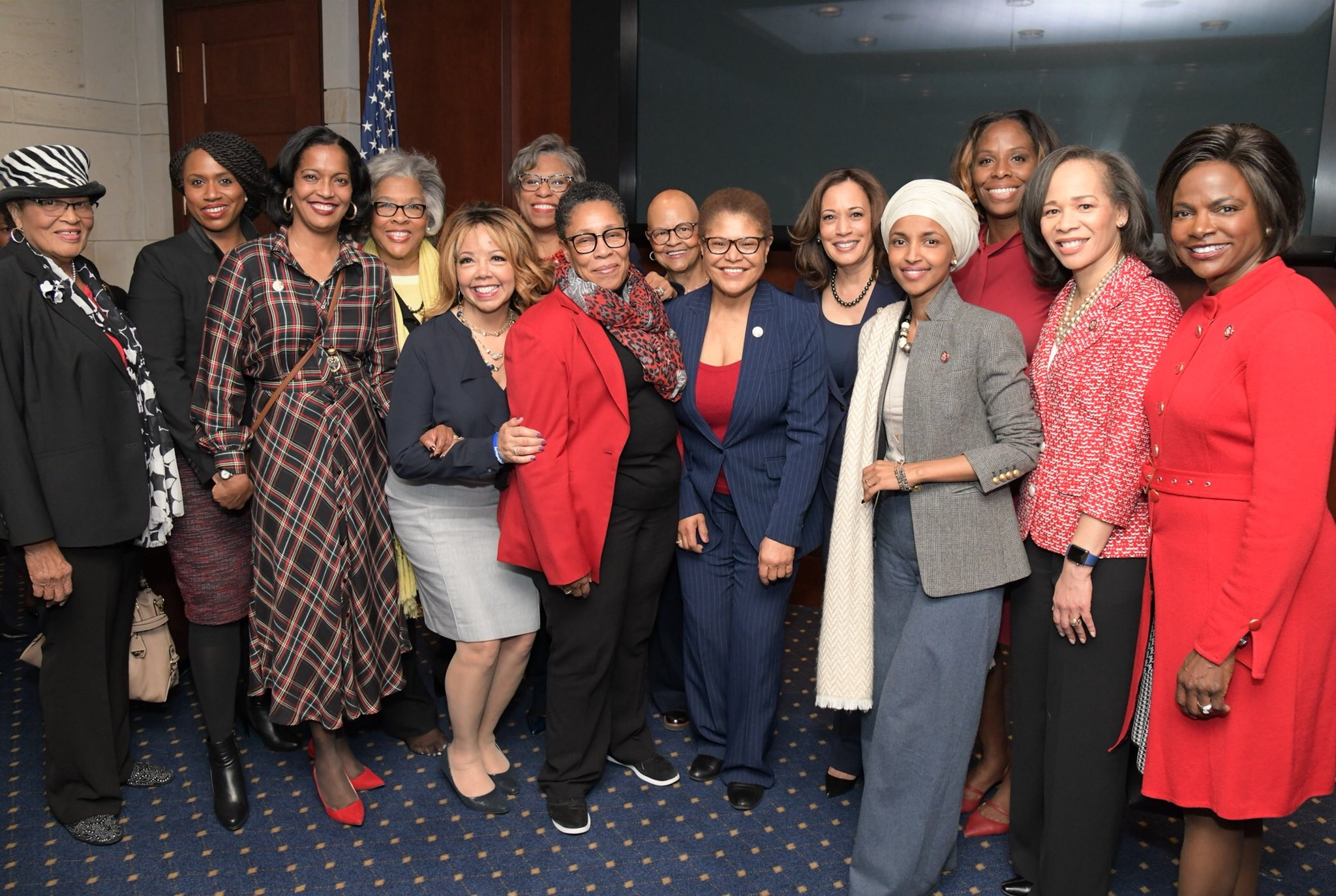
Demings (furthest to right) with Congressional Black Caucus women

Demings was sworn in on January 3, 2017. She was a member of the New Democrat Coalition and the Congressional Black Caucus.

Between January 21, 2021 and January 3, 2023, at the end of her tenure in the House, Demings had voted in line with President Joe Biden's stated position 100% of the time.

=== Committee assignments ===
- Committee on Homeland Security
  - Subcommittee on Border and Maritime Security
- Committee on the Judiciary
  - Subcommittee on Crime, Terrorism, Homeland Security, and Investigations (Vice Chair)
  - Subcommittee on Regulatory Reform, Commercial and Antitrust Law
- Permanent Select Committee on Intelligence
  - Subcommittee on Defense Intelligence and Warfighter Support
  - Subcommittee on Intelligence Modernization and Readiness

=== Caucus memberships ===
- New Democrat Coalition
- Congressional Black Caucus

== 2022 U.S. Senate campaign ==
In June 2021, Demings announced her candidacy for the Democratic nomination in Florida's 2022 U.S. Senate election. The incumbent U.S. Senator, Republican Marco Rubio, ran for reelection in 2022. In March 2022, PolitiFact reported that Demings falsely claimed that Rubio supported tax hikes. She lost to Rubio in the November 8, 2022, general election.

== Post-congressional career ==
On July 25, 2024, President Joe Biden nominated Demings to serve as a member of the Board of Governors of the United States Postal Service. The U.S. Senate did not confirm her nomination and it expired at the end of the 118th Congress.

In 2025, Demings was a speculated candidate to succeed her husband in the 2026 election for Mayor of Orange County, although she announced she would not run for the position in June. She has also been a speculated candidate for the 2027 Orlando mayoral election.

== Political positions ==
=== Abortion ===
Demings received a 100% voting score from NARAL Pro-Choice America for 2017, 2018, and 2019. She received a 100% rating from Planned Parenthood Action Fund for 2020. She has an F rating from the anti-abortion Susan B. Anthony List.

=== Civil liberties ===
Demings received a 100% rating from the American Civil Liberties Union for the 117th Congress.

=== Climate and environment ===
Demings received a 97% lifetime rating from the League of Conservation Voters based on scores from 2017 to 2021. The group also endorsed her 2022 Senate campaign.

=== Filibuster ===
Demings supports eliminating the filibuster in the United States Senate.

=== Foreign policy ===
==== Israel and Palestine ====
In a December 2016 interview Demings, then representative-elect, said "I'd love to go to Israel, and I know I’ll get to do that as a member of Congress." In August 2017, Demings and her husband, along with other members of Congress, went on a trip to Israel sponsored by the American Israel Education Foundation, an organization affiliated with AIPAC, as part of the foundation's mission to "educate all members of Congress about the strategic partnership between the United States and Israel."

In December 2016, the United States abstained from voting on U.N. Security Council resolution 2334, which reaffirmed the illegality of Israeli settlements in the occupied Palestinian territories, including East Jerusalem, and demanding that Israel immediately and completely cease all settlement activities. In response, on January 5, 2017, a few weeks before Barack Obama was to leave the White House, Demings, along with the rest of Florida's Democratic congressional delegation, supported a resolution introduced by Ed Royce (R-CA-39) which "declared unwavering support for Israel and insisted that the United States reject any future UN actions that are similarly 'one-sided and anti-Israel.'"

In 2022, she was among 105 co-sonsors of a resolution to recognize the 30th anniversary of the March 17th, 1992 bombing of the Israeli embassy in Buenos Aires, Argentina, which also commended "the Government of Argentina for adopting the International Holocaust Remembrance Alliance working definition of antisemitism and encourages other partners and allies to do the same".

Demings' 2022 Senate campaign was supported by Democratic Majority for Israel's PAC as well as Urban Empowerment Action PAC, a SuperPAC founded by Bakari Sellers with the goal of electing "Pro-Israel Black Democrats".

=== Gun policy ===
Demings has said that she seeks to keep firearms out of the hands of "people who seek to do harm", saying that the gun control legislation she supports "isn’t about taking guns away from responsible, law-abiding people." She supported the Gun Violence Restraining Order Act of 2017, which would have provided a lawful method of temporarily confiscating firearms from people deemed to be a threat to themselves or others. Of the act, Demings said, "We must do what we can to make sure law enforcement has the tools it needs to more effectively perform the ever more challenging job of keeping us a safe nation. The Gun Violence Restraining Order Act is a major step to doing just that."

After the Stoneman Douglas High School shooting in 2018, Demings opposed arming teachers, calling the idea "ridiculous" and saying it would "only shift the responsibility from lawmakers to others. It shifts the pain, the hurt, and the guilt to school staff who will find themselves outskilled and outgunned in active shooter situations." She expressed frustration at the difficultly of getting gun legislation passed, and said, "Many times this conversation is hijacked by the NRA and the gun lobby, who try to make it about the Second Amendment."

Demings has an "F" rating from the NRA Political Victory Fund (NRA-PVF).

=== Healthcare ===
Demings supports and has vowed to defend the Affordable Care Act.

In June 2019 Demings released a congressional report on insulin prices, criticizing manufacturers for raising prices well beyond manufacturing costs, and said it was "inexcusable that American families are dying for the sake of corporate profit."

=== Impeachments of President Donald Trump ===
On December 18, 2019, Demings voted for both articles of impeachment against President Donald Trump. She was selected as one of seven House impeachment managers who presented the impeachment case against Trump during his trial before the United States Senate.

On January 13, 2021, Demings voted for the single article of impeachment in the second impeachment of President Donald Trump.

=== 2021 U.S. Electoral College vote count ===
Citing the unusually contested 2021 United States Electoral College vote count and the 2021 storming of the United States Capitol, Demings joined Representative Cori Bush in sponsoring House Resolution 25 on January 11, 2021, seeking to expel the 138 Republican U.S. Representatives who voted to object to the electoral college certification.

== Personal life ==
Demings's husband, Jerry Demings, is mayor of Orange County, Florida, and the former Orange County Sheriff. He served as the chief of the Orlando Police Department, the first African American to do so, from 1999 to 2002. The two met on patrol in the OPD; they married in 1988 and have three children.

Demings is a member of The Links and Delta Sigma Theta sorority.

== Electoral history ==
Florida 10th Congressional District 2012 General Election
Party	Candidate	Votes	%
Republican	Daniel Webster (Incumbent)	164,649	51.7
Democratic	Val Demings	153,574	48.3
Write-In	Naipaul Seegolam	46	0.0
Total votes		318,269	100.0

Florida 10th Congressional District 2016 Primary Election
Party	Candidate	Votes	%
Democratic	Val Demings	23,260	57.12
Democratic	Geraldine F. Thompson	8,192	20.12
Democratic	Bob Poe	6,918	16.99
Democratic	Fatima Rita Fahmy	2,349	5.77
Total votes		40,719	100

Florida 10th Congressional District 2016 General Election
Party	Candidate	Votes	%
Democratic	Val Demings	198,491	64.87
Republican	Thuy Lowe	107,498	35.13
Total votes		305,989	100
Democratic gain from Republican			

2018 Florida 10th Congressional District Democratic primary
Party	Candidate	Votes	%
Democratic	Val Demings (incumbent)	73,583	75.0
Democratic	Wade Darius	24,519	25.0
Total votes		98,102	100.0

Florida 10th Congressional District 2020 Election
Party	Candidate	Votes	%
Democratic	Val Demings (incumbent)	239,434	63.61%
Republican	Vennia Francois	136,889	36.36%
Independent	Sufiyah Yasmine (write-in)	74	0.01%
Total votes		376,397	100.0
Democratic hold			

United States Senate election in Florida, 2022
Party	Candidate	Votes	%	±%
Republican	Marco Rubio (incumbent)	4,474,847	57.68%	+5.70%
Democratic	Val Demings	3,201,522	41.27%	−3.04%
Libertarian	Dennis Misigoy	32,177	0.41%	−1.71%
Independent	Steven B. Grant	31,816	0.41%	N/A
Independent	Tuan TQ Nguyen	17,385	0.22%	N/A
Write-in		267	0.00%	±0.00%
Total votes		7,758,014	100.00%	N/A
Republican hold				

== See also ==
- List of African-American United States representatives
- List of African-American United States Senate candidates
- Women in the United States House of Representatives

U.S. House of Representatives
Preceded by Daniel Webster	Member of the U.S. House of Representatives from Florida's 10th congressional district 2017–2023	Succeeded by Maxwell Frost
Party political offices
Preceded by Patrick Murphy	Democratic nominee for U.S. Senator from Florida (Class 3); 2022	Succeeded by Angie Nixon
U.S. order of precedence (ceremonial)
Preceded by Rich Nugent as Former U.S. Representative	Order of precedence of the United States as Former U.S. Representative	Succeeded by Al Lawson as Former U.S. Representative
