= Felipe Sousa-Lazaballet =

Brazilian-American politician

Member of the Florida House of Representatives from the 42nd district
- Incumbent
- Assumed office November 3, 2026
- Preceded by: Anna Eskamani

Personal details
- Born: March 4, 1986 (age 40) Duque de Caxias, Rio de Janeiro, Brazil
- Party: Democratic
- Spouse: Luis Sousa-Lazaballet
- Education: Miami Dade College; St. Thomas University
- Occupation: Activist; nonprofit executive
- Website: Campaign website

Felipe Sousa-Lazaballet (March 4, 1986) is a Brazilian-American politician living in the United States who is a member of the Democratic Party. In 2026, he was elected to the Florida Legislature.

== Biography ==
Son of a single mother who worked as a housekeeper originally from Ceará, Felipe was born in Duque de Caxias, in the Baixada Fluminense region, in Rio de Janeiro, in 1986. He immigrated to the United States in 2001 at the age of 14, brought there by an older sister who lived in Florida. In the United States, he lived as an undocumented immigrant. Even though he was living in the country illegally, he managed to study International Relations at Miami Dade College in Florida. He also graduated from the University of St. Thomas with a degree in Business Administration, with a concentration in Economics.

He began his political activism around 2006, advocating for immigrants' rights in the United States. In 2010, he participated in the Trail of Dreams, organized by Dreamers, a 1,500-km march from Florida to Washington, D. C., to put pressure on then-President Barack Obama, to develop improvements and public policies regarding the situation of immigrants in the U.S.. The initial pressure did not materialize, as the bill did not move forward in the U.S. Congress. According to the Brazilian Mayara Paixão journalist from Folha de S. Paulo newspaper, Felipe celebrated the passage of the Deferred Action for Childhood Arrivals (DACA) program, which was approved in 2012 during Obama’s presidency.

Felipe lived in New York for a short time, then returned to Florida in 2016 to work for the City Hall of Orlando. In June of that year, in a homophobic attack, gunman Omar Mateen killed 50 people at a gay nightclub in the city. The massacre at the Pulse nightclub is still considered the deadliest attack on the LGBTQIA+ community in U.S. history. Felipe worked to support the survivors and the victims’ families. Later, she began coordinating the Hope CommUnity Center, a nonprofit organization dedicated to supporting immigrants, low-income families, and farmworkers.

In 2026, he ran as a Democratic Party candidate for a seat in the Florida Legislature, representing Florida's 42nd House of Representatives district. During the campaign, he advocated for policies promoting inclusion and expanding opportunities for Florida residents under the slogan “Thrive Together.” After receiving nearly 50,000 votes, he was elected, defeated the Republican candidate, Bonnie Jackson. Felipe became the first Brazilian to be elected to the Florida House of Representatives. He also became the first openly gay immigrant to hold a seat in the House.

=== Electoral performance ===
Year	Election	District	Votes	Result	Ref.
2026	Florida House of Representatives election	42nd	49 752	Elected	

== Personal life ==
Felipe is gay. Felipe is married to Luis Sousa-Lazaballet. In 2021, he received his green card and became a U.S. citizen.
