= Paula Stark =

Florida politician and author (born 1957)

Paula A. Stark
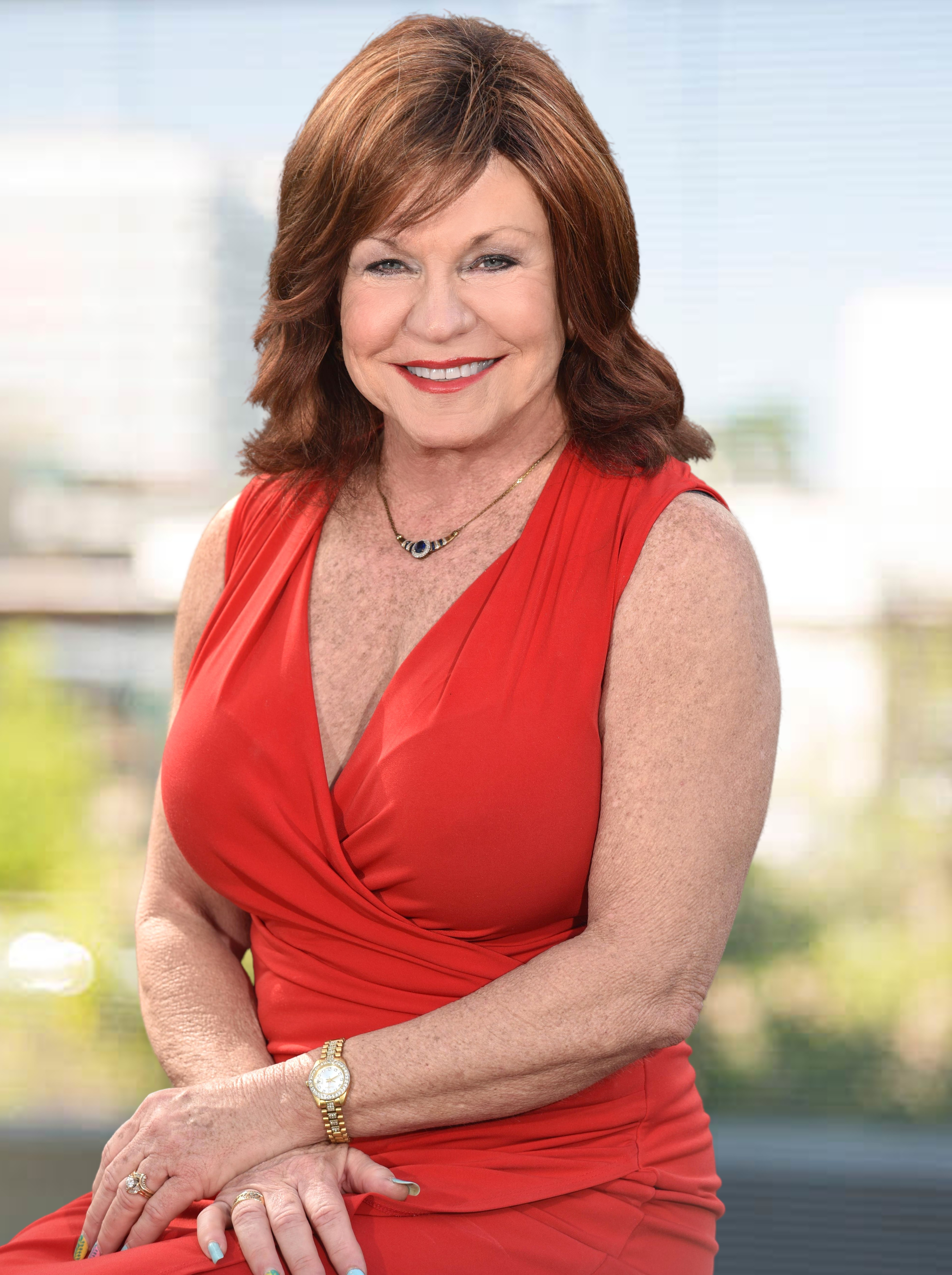
- Campaign portrait, 2022

Member of the Florida House of Representatives from the 47th district
- In office November 8, 2022 – November 3, 2026
- Preceded by: Anna Eskamani
- Succeeded by: Anthony Nieves

Personal details
- Born: April 11, 1957 (age 69) Dothan, Alabama, U.S.
- Party: Republican

Paula Allene Stark is an American politician and member of the Florida House of Representatives for the 47th district. She was first elected to office on November 8, 2022.

== Early life and education ==
Paula Stark was born in Dothan, Alabama. The former Miss Osceola graduated from Osceola High School in Kissimmee Florida and attended Florida Technological University.

== Career ==
In 2022 Stark filed to run for Florida state house representative for District 47 and won election in November of that year.

Stark is the executive director of St. Cloud Main Street as of 2022 and was the publisher of the Osceola News Gazette. She retired in 2012.

Stark filed for re-election in June 2023. Paula Stark won re-election on November 5, 2024, for Florida House District 47 despite Democrat voter advantage.

Representative Paula Stark's achievement of the 2024 Florida House session was working to pass her House Bill 613, the “Mobile Home Park Lot Tenancies” in the 2024 Florida Legislature. The law became effective on July 1, 2024.

An error with her failing to submit required candidate paperwork means that Stark will not appear on the November 2026 ballot for re-election.
