= Anna Eskamani =

American politician (born 1990)

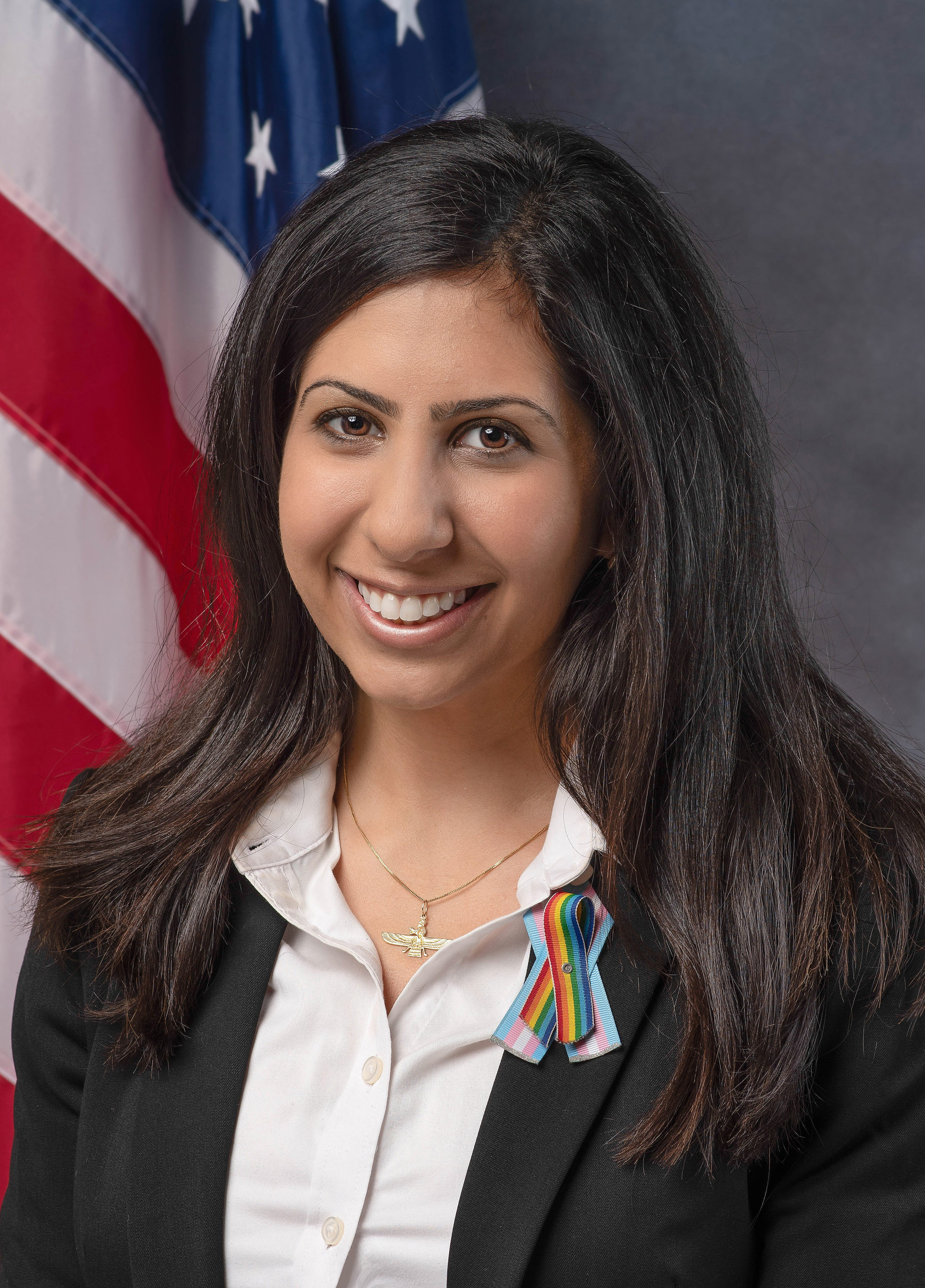
- Official portrait, 2018

Member of the Florida House of Representatives
- In office November 6, 2018 – November 3, 2026
- Preceded by: Mike Miller
- Succeeded by: Felipe Sousa-Lazaballet
- Constituency: 47th district (2018–2022); 42nd district (2022–2026)

Personal details
- Born: Anna Vishkaee Eskamani; May 20, 1990 (age 36) Orlando, Florida, U.S.
- Party: Democratic
- Education: University of Central Florida (BA, BA, MA, MA, PhD)
- Website: Campaign website

Anna Vishkaee Eskamani (/ˈɑːnə vɪʃˈkaɪ ɛskəˈmɑːni/, AH-nə vish-KAI ES-kə-MAH-nee; born May 20, 1990) is an American politician who served as a Democratic member of the Florida House of Representatives from 2018 to 2026, representing central portions of Orange County. She was the first Iranian American elected to the Florida Legislature. In December 2024, Eskamani announced her candidacy for mayor of Orlando in the 2027 election.

== Early life and education ==
Eskamani was born in Orlando, Florida, to parents who immigrated to the United States from Iran. Eskamani has an older brother and a twin sister. In 2004, Eskamani's mother died of colon cancer.

Eskamani attended University High School in Orlando, from 2004 to 2008, where she participated in after-school technical theater. Eskamani attended the University of Central Florida (UCF), where she earned two bachelor's degrees in 2012, two master's degrees in 2016, and her PhD in public affairs in 2024. She also earned two certificates and taught at UCF as an adjunct professor.

In 2016, Eskamani was named a UCF Alumni Association 30 under 30 honoree. In 2020, she was selected by UCF as a member of their Distinguished Alumnus, the highest annual honor UCF Alumni bestows upon a graduate.

== Political career ==
=== Planned Parenthood ===
According to Eskamani, she first became involved with Planned Parenthood as a patient in 2008. With abstinence-only education at her public school, she turned to Planned Parenthood for information about family planning and reproductive health. From there, Eskamani began volunteering at her local Planned Parenthood affiliate, and in 2012, was hired to serve as a development coordinator. She worked at Planned Parenthood for six years, rising to become the organization's senior director of public affairs and communications for the merged affiliate known as Planned Parenthood of Southwest and Central Florida.

=== 2018 Florida House of Representatives campaign ===
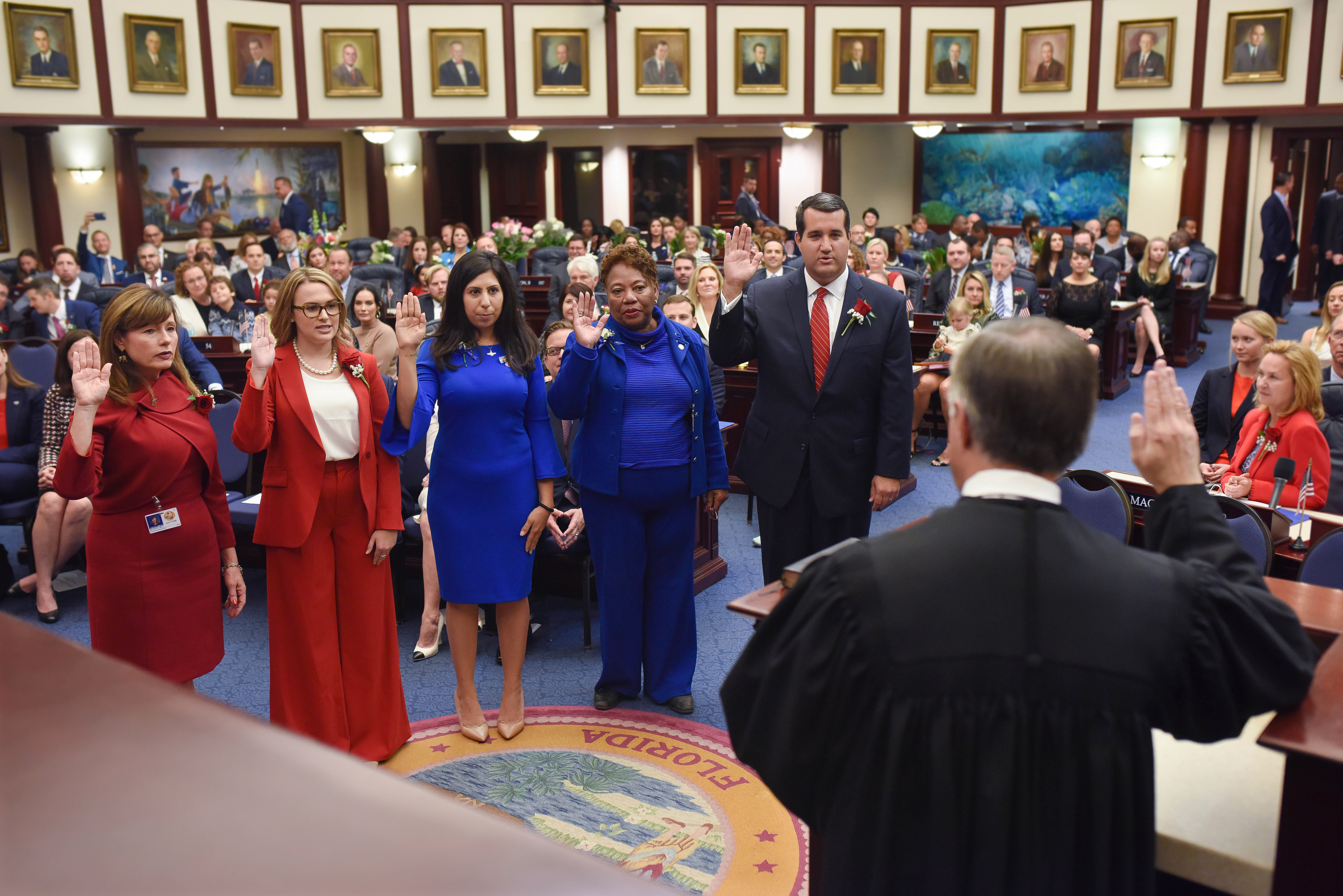
Eskamani being sworn in as a member of the Florida House of Representatives in 2018

On July 3, 2017, Eskamani announced her candidacy for the 47th district seat in the Florida House of Representatives. She ran for the open seat vacated by Republican Mike Miller, who had served two terms in the district before announcing a run for Congress. On December 20, 2017, Eskamani faced two Republican opponents in a primary and one Democratic opponent who did not live in the district and would eventually withdraw from the race after Eskamani filed a lawsuit challenging his legitimacy as a candidate. Over the course of her 2018 campaign, Eskamani received endorsements from prominent community leaders, organizations, and politicians. This included President Barack Obama, Orlando mayor Buddy Dyer, Congresswoman Stephanie Murphy, Equality Florida, AFL–CIO, and the Florida Professional Firefighters State Association.

Eskamani identifies as a progressive Democrat, and focused her campaign on enhancing public education, protecting the environment, ensuring health care access and prioritizing gun control legislation.

During her campaign, Eskamani gained national media attention for her advocacy on women's issues and gun control legislation. Pulse nightclub is located in Florida's 47th district, and Eskamani often spoke about gun violence. She was featured on the cover of Time magazine, in The Atlantic, the New York Times, the Independent, by MTV News, Teen Vogue, and in a Vice News documentary series.

The Orlando Sentinel described Eskamani's race as one of the most contentious in the area. Her Republican opponent, Stockton Reeves VI, sent out at least twenty-five pieces of mail alongside three television ads that were negative toward Eskamani. Eskamani addressed each attack directly. Despite being a first time candidate, Eskamani raised more than $522,000 for her campaign.

Eskamani prevailed in the general election on November 6, 2018, winning 57% of the vote over the 43% for Republican candidate Stockton Reeves. Eskamani became the first Iranian-American to serve in the Florida Legislature.

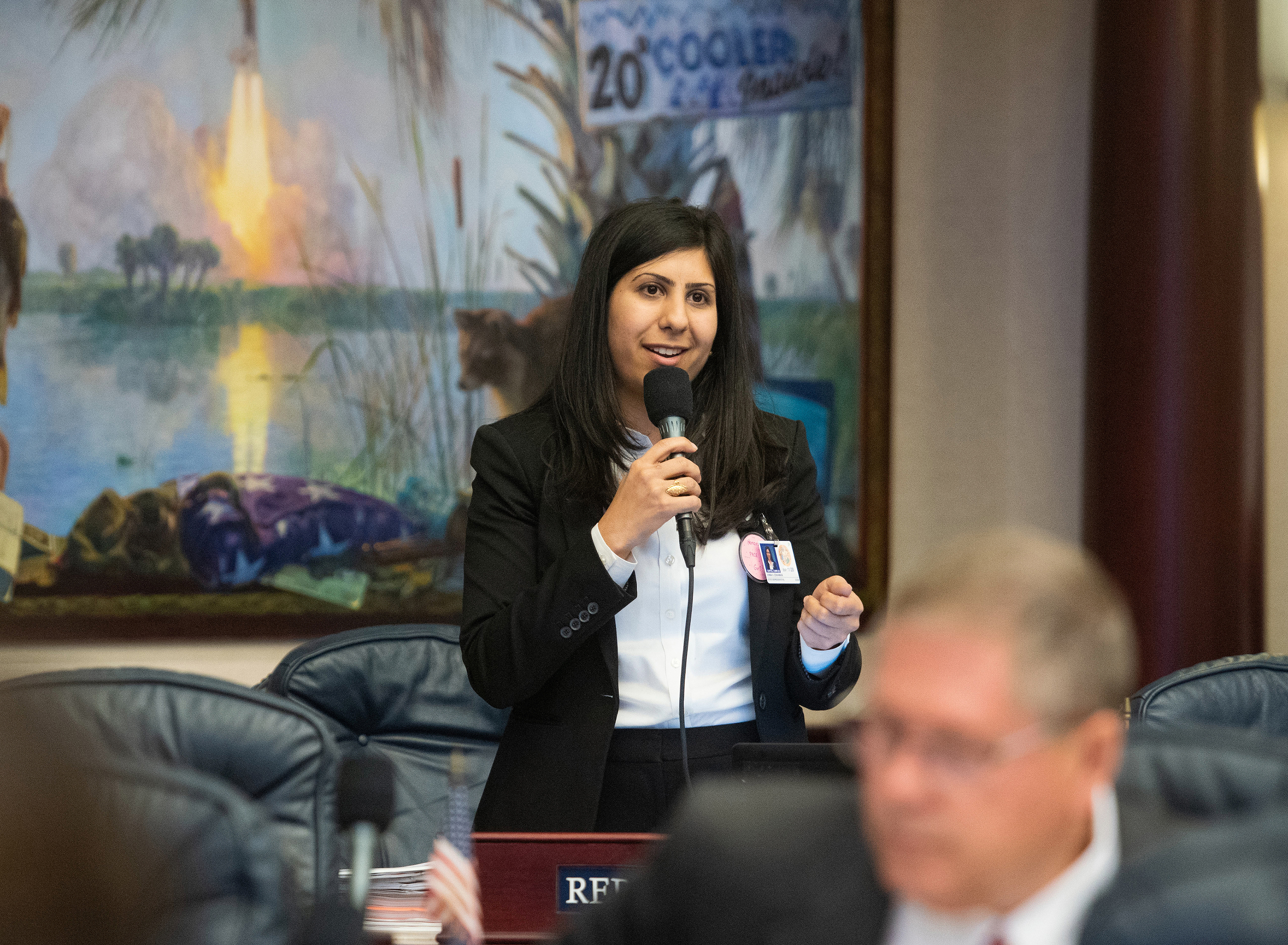
Eskamani debates a measure on the House floor in 2019

=== 2019 Florida legislative session ===
Eskamani was appointed to serve on four legislative committees in the Florida House of Representatives: Local, Federal & Veterans Affairs Subcommittee, Oversight, Transparency & Public Management Subcommittee, PreK-12 Quality Subcommittee, and Ways & Means Committee. During the first week of legislative committee meetings in Tallahassee, Eskamani made a public decision to not attend a freshman reception hosted by Associated Industries of Florida. Eskamani was quoted as saying, "I didn't come here for ritzy parties".

During the 2019 legislative session, Eskamani was featured by the Tampa Bay Times as being on the front lines of the abortion debate. She was also a leader for the failed attempt to run out the clock on legislation that would define sanctuary city policies in Florida law.

When a woman who alleged domestic violence was charged with armed burglary and grand theft for entering into her husband's locked apartment and taking his guns to the Lakeland, Florida police in June 2019, Eskamani tweeted that an arrest was "ridiculous" in this kind of situation. She sent a letter to State Attorney Brian Haas stating "Prosecuting Ms. Irby sets a scary precedent that if someone seeks help to escape abuse, they will be punished for it." The State Attorney's Office dropped all charges for both parties who were involved in a highly emotional contested divorce action in order for them to resolve their issues in a family law court. Eskamani also filed legislation in 2019 to eliminate statutory limitations for a minor who experienced sexual assault, legislation that ultimately became law in 2020.

Eskamani is an advocate for public education, school safety, and environmental protection. Eskamani sponsored ten bills herself and co-sponsored more than sixty. She also succeeded in securing $80,000 for a Central Florida nonprofit focused on human trafficking prevention called the Lifeboat Project. She was also successful in working across the aisle to increase arts and cultural funding statewide by 800%.

=== 2020 Florida legislative session ===
Eskamani continued to serve on Local, Federal, & Veterans Affairs Subcommittee, Oversight, Transparency, & Public Management Subcommittee, and Ways & Means Committee, but was removed from the PreK-12 Quality Subcommittee likely for being "too vocal" on her support of public education.

On November 5, 2019, during Committee Weeks for the upcoming 2020 legislative session, Eskamani and Senator José Javier Rodríguez were successful in preventing Investor Owned Utilities (IOU) in Florida from having lower energy efficiency goals under the Florida Energy Efficiency Conservation Act (FEECA). Eskamani spoke before the Florida Public Service Commission in support of higher energy efficiency goals than the proposed goals and more emphasis on renewable energy sources. Eskamani also spoke for the need for Florida to establish new cost-benefit measurements versus the current use of the Ratepayer Impact Measurement (RIM) Test. Eskamani has tried to raise awareness on the role the Florida Public Service Commission plays in the lives of everyday Floridians.

During the 2020 legislative session, Eskamani played a leading role in seeking an investigation of the Florida Coalition Against Domestic Violence, a state organization whose CEO received more than $7.5 million in compensation over a three-year period, including millions of dollars in paid time off. The investigation ultimately led to the State of Florida ending its contract with the organization.

Eskamani also worked with Senator Randolph Bracy to file the legislation to end the school-to-prison pipeline. Filed in honor of Kaia Rolle, a six-year-old black Orlando girl who was arrested by police. The legislation Eskamani introduced would set a statutory limitation on the arrest of minors. The bill took shape as several amendments between the House and Senate chambers and did not pass in the final hours of the legislative session.

One of the biggest debates during the 2020 legislative session was focused on education. Eskamani filed legislation to prohibit public dollars from going to any voucher school that discriminate against students or parents for identifying as LGBTQ+. She also supported public school teachers receiving a pay raise but pushed for additional funding than what was provided.

Another issue Eskamani championed focused on corporate taxation. During the 2020 legislative session Eskamani sponsored numerous amendments to remove special interest tax breaks from the main tax package. She also filed amendments for Florida to implement combined reporting in an effort to close corporate tax loopholes. In addition, Eskamani worked with the Minority Caucus members to file several amendments to repeal a corporate tax refund of $543 million, stating that those dollars could be spent on essential state services versus be sent back to major corporations. No amendment passed.

=== 2020 Florida House of Representatives campaign ===
In 2020, Eskamani won her re-election bid with a greater vote margin than she did in 2018, receiving 59% of the vote.

Much of her campaign consisted of virtual events and her constituent services, particularly for unemployed Floridians. On the campaign end, the team hosted numerous virtual phonebanks, and events, including one event with actor Mark Hamill. During the onset of the coronavirus pandemic, Eskamani suspended her campaign field activities from March until June, focusing on relaying public health information. Additionally, during the year of 2020 and 2021, Eskamani's legislative office fielded thousands of unemployment claims, earning her national recognition. The Tampa Bay Times, and other news outlets reported on how her office helped countless claimants navigate the unemployment website established by the Florida Department of Economic Opportunity. This propelled her campaign forward locally, earning her the endorsement of the Orlando Sentinel, and a nomination from the newspaper's board and readers for her work helping unemployed Floridians.

=== 2021 Florida legislative session ===
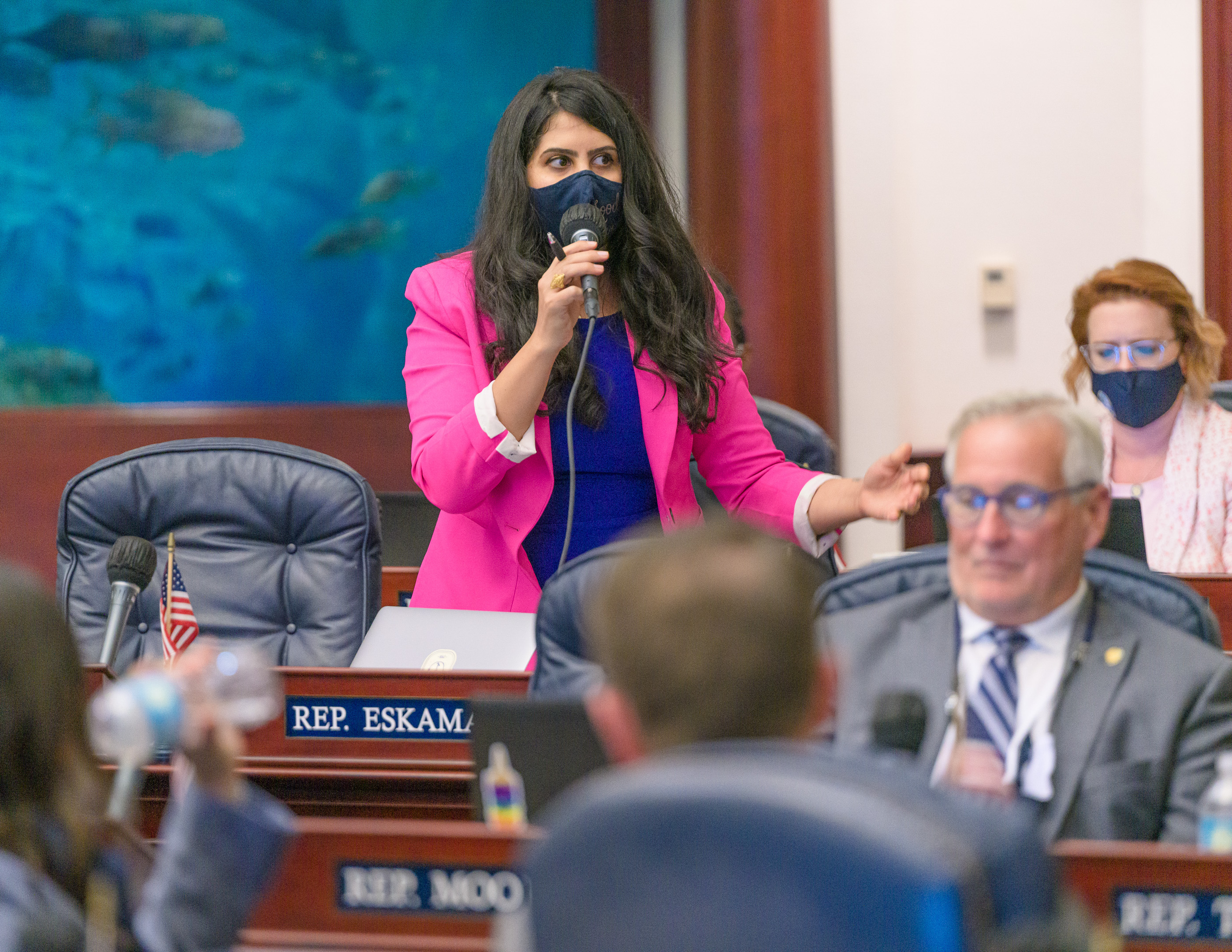
Rep. Eskamani questions a bill sponsor on the House floor in April 2021

Following her re-election, Eskamani filed legislation largely focused on the issues witnessed during her campaign such as HB 207, that would have among other changes, expanded eligibility for benefits, provide greater oversight for the Department of Economic Opportunity that manages Florida's unemployment system, and most controversially, increase the minimum and maximum weekly benefit by more than $100. The measure failed to receive a hearing in the State House, however one aspect of the bill (increasing weekly benefit amounts by $100) passed the Florida Senate unanimously. Eskamani matched the senate's proposed increase in an amendment to HB 1463 that would improve the state's CONNECT website, but that amendment ultimately failed along party lines. Additionally, she refiled legislation that would establish renewable energy goals, and a bill that would prohibit public dollars from going to schools that discriminated against LGBT+ students or parents, neither bill received a hearing. Notably, she received her first bill hearing this session with HB 409 that would establish the cy pres doctrine for civil cases which would hopefully increase funding for civil legal aid organizations. The bill received bipartisan support in the Civil Justice and Property Rights Committee and Public Integrity and Election Committee. It ultimately died in the Judiciary Committee after it failed to get a hearing before the end of the 2021 session.

Eskamani successfully passed appropriations projects in the house for local organization in her constituency. However, two appropriations that would benefit mental health counseling for survivors of the Pulse nightclub massacre, and money to help fund the Zebra Coalition that provides support for homeless LGBT+ youth, both of which Eskamani sponsored, were vetoed by Governor Ron DeSantis along with appropriations for the Lifeboat Project which helps human trafficking victims and an appropriation for an ADA improvements for Winter Park Mead Botanical Gardens, a park inside her house district.

=== 2022 Florida legislative session ===
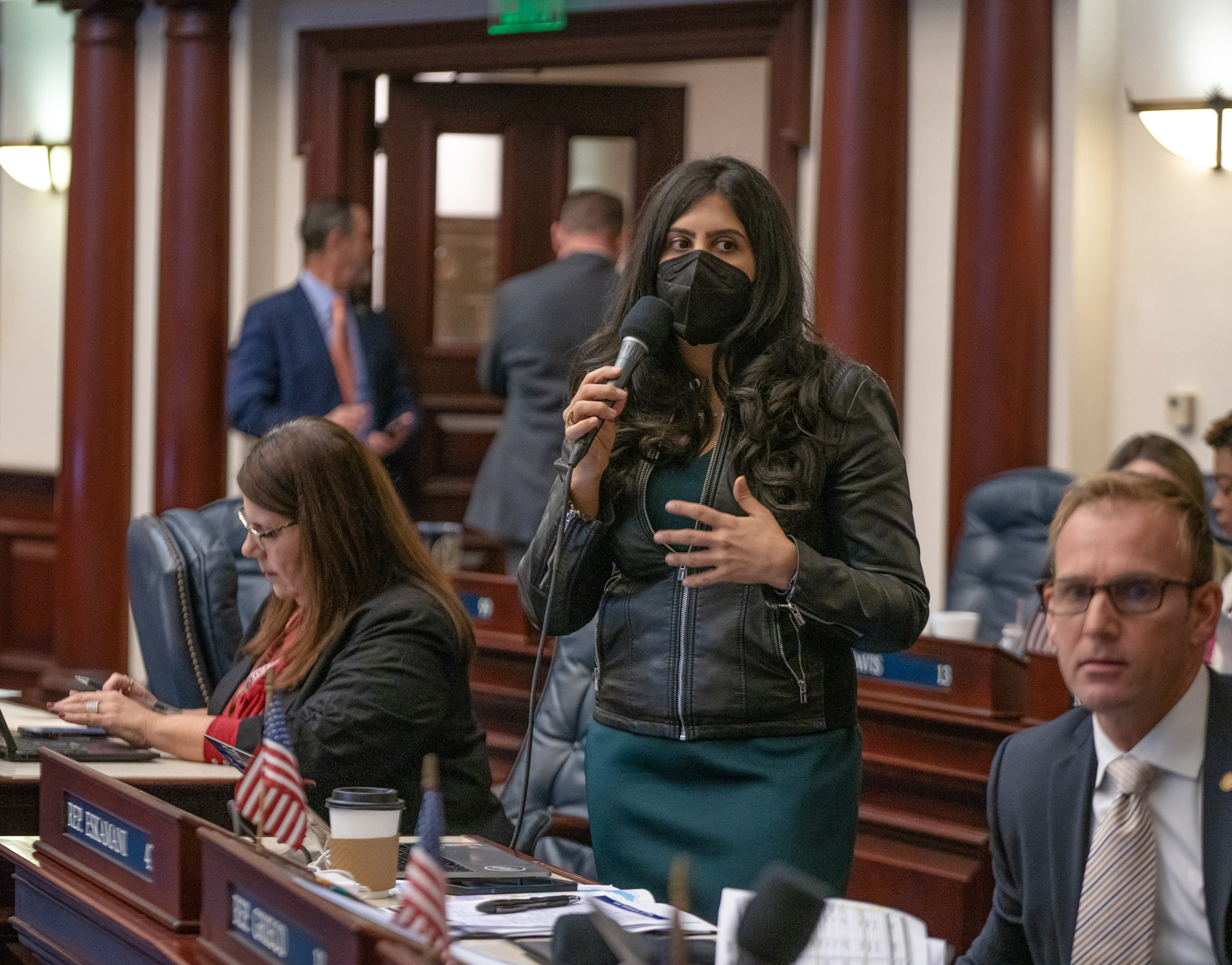
Rep. Eskamani explains a bill on the House floor in February 2022

During the 2022 legislative session, Eskamani successfully secured a yearlong tax break for all children's diapers in the Florida Tax Package, which is expected to be signed into law by Governor Ron DeSantis and would begin on July 1, 2022. She was also effective in stopping new corporate tax giveaways, and secured from than $2 million in the state budget for local funding projects. Another success was fully funding arts and culture grant programs in the State of Florida.

On April 21, 2022, Eskamani attempted to stage a sit-in demonstration to prevent a vote on Florida's congressional district maps. Opponents of the tactic compared her actions to an insurrection. The demonstration was ultimately unsuccessful.

In early April 2022, Eskamani argued that there hadn't been an "evidence-based analysis" on the impact of the Reedy Creek Improvement District and described calls for repeal of the Reedy Creek Improvement Act as a message from DeSantis that those who challenge him "will be punished." She also called DeSantis' call for repeal "truly performative."

Later, Eskamani said she opposed the repeal, and congressional redistricting efforts proposed during the special legislative session convened by DeSantis. In a tweet, she added that the actions by the Florida Republican Party were anti-democratic and emblematic of "one party rule drunk on power and bullying anyone in their way into submission." An amendment by Eskamani to restrict special districts from constructing a nuclear power plant, exercising eminent domain outside their borders, and constructing "exclusive" roads that go above the "authority and jurisdiction" of the Florida Department of Transportation was rejected. On Twitter, Eskamani said that the amendment "failed along a party line vote."

=== 2022 Florida House of Representatives campaign ===
In 2022, Eskamani ran again for re-election in the newly drawn House District 42. This was similar to her previous district but did not include the College Park neighborhood and instead included the City of Maitland and the historic Town of Eatonville. Through a grassroots campaign, Eskamani won her re-election bid with 56% of the vote.

=== 2023 Florida legislative session ===
During the 2023 legislative session, Eskamani successfully secured a permanent tax break for all children's diapers and adult incontinence products in the Florida Tax Package, which is expected to be signed into law by Governor Ron DeSantis and would begin on July 1, 2023. Much like the previous legislative session, Eskamani serves as the ranking member of the Florida House's Ways & Means Committee and she was again effective in stopping new corporate tax giveaways, and secured from than $7 million in the state budget for local funding projects. Another success was funding arts and culture grant programs in the State of Florida at 85%.

Eskamani led the Democratic Caucus against the Florida Republicans 6 week abortion ban, helping Democratic colleagues file more than 50 amendments to stop the bill from passing. Ultimately the bill passed and was signed quickly into law by Governor Ron DeSantis. Eskamani also opposed legislation targeting the LGBTQ+ community, immigrants, voting rights, unions and local control. She currently serves as the chair of both the Orange County Legislative Delegation and the Florida Legislature's Energy and Climate Caucus.

Eskamani also attempted to stop what has been the continuation of tension between Governor Ron DeSantis and Walt Disney World by filing amendments that would protect the public from paying for lawsuits connected to this debate and legislation to expand the scope of policy targeting Walt Disney World to ensure that all companies are truly treated the same. Those amendments did not pass. Eskamani also opposed policy that would allow Governor Ron DeSantis to run for President without resigning from his current position.

In July 2023, Eskamani was interviewed by MSNBC about the effects of Senate Bill 1718 to speak about the negative effects the bill had on the use of immigrant labor. Agriculture and construction, two industries have long relied on migrant workers, were seeing worker shortages as a result of the bill. Farmworkers Association of Florida reported that undocumented farm workers, who make up 60% of Florida's farm workers, reported fear of legal backlash if they were to show up to work.

=== 2024 Florida legislative session ===
During the 2024 session, Eskamani served as a prominent critic of Republican-led initiatives, including bills that weakened child labor laws and restricted LGBTQ+ healthcare. As the Democratic Ranking Member of the Ways & Means Committee, she focused on tax relief for working families, successfully advocating for the permanent elimination of sales tax on children’s diapers and adult incontinence products. While she opposed several high-profile policy bills, she voted in favor of the $117.5 billion state budget after securing millions in funding for Central Florida projects, such as the Holocaust Museum for Hope & Humanity and environmental studies for the Winter Park Chain of Lakes.

=== 2025 Florida legislative session ===
In the 2025 session, Eskamani continued her leadership on the State Affairs and Ways & Means committees, where she led the debate against a $5 billion sales tax cut that she argued would result in significant funding gaps for public education and environmental programs. She emerged as a primary opponent of HB 1205, a bill that increased barriers for citizen-led constitutional amendments, labeling the move as "anti-democratic." Her legislative priorities during the session included the "Right to Repair" for motorized wheelchairs and the introduction of statewide protocols for student elopement and drowning prevention education, while also securing multiple commemorative resolutions for heritage and health awareness.

=== 2026 Florida legislative session ===
Eskamani served on several key committees, notably acting as the Democratic Ranking Member for both the State Affairs and Ways & Means committees. Her additional assignments included the Security & Threat Assessment Committee, the Select Committee on Property Taxes, and subcommittees focusing on Economic Infrastructure, Human Services, and Industries & Professional Activities. During the 2026 session tenure, Eskamani successfully passed HB 503, which focuses on drowning prevention, and HB 423, a bill addressing student elopement protocols.

=== 2027 Orlando mayoral election campaign ===
On December 16, 2024, Eskamani announced via X her intention to run for mayor of the city of Orlando in 2027. Buddy Dyer, the incumbent since 2003, has stated he will not seek reelection. Eskamani was the first high-profile candidate to enter the race, with the 2027 election marking the first time since 2003 that there will not be an incumbent running for reelection. Since launching in 2024, Eskamani has raised over $1 million dollars and received key endorsements from state legislators and labor unions.

== Election history ==
2022 Florida House of Representatives General election District 42
Party	Candidate	Votes	%
Democratic	Anna V. Eskamani	43,103	56.6%
Republican	Bonnie Jackson	33,014	43.4%
Total votes		76,117	100%
Democratic hold			

2020 Florida House of Representatives General election District 47
Party	Candidate	Votes	%
Democratic	Anna V. Eskamani	59,494	59.0%
Republican	Jeremy Sisson	41,321	41.0%
Total votes		100,815	100%
Democratic hold			

2018 Florida House of Representatives General election District 47
Party	Candidate	Votes	%
Democratic	Anna V. Eskamani	46,218	57.3%
Republican	Stockton Reeves	34,433	42.7%
Total votes		80,651	100%

Florida House of Representatives
Preceded by Mike Miller	Member of the Florida House of Representatives from the 47th district 2018–2022	Succeeded by Paula Stark
Preceded by Fred Hawkins	Member of the Florida House of Representatives from the 42nd district 2022–present	Succeeded by Felipe Sousa Lazaballet
