= Tequila Party =

The National Tequila Party (NTP) is a nonpartisan American political movement consisting of Latinos and their supporters. NTP's membership consists of independent, Democratic & Republican party members. It was formed in 2011 by DeeDee Garcia Blase, who was disappointed when she saw both political parties as failures, and their lack of policies on immigration.

The National Tequila Party Movement is a nonpartisan, Latina-led organization promoting a 2012 nationwide get-out-the-vote for young Latinos. The Tequila Party Movement also promotes the passage of Comprehensive Immigration Reform (CIR) and the DREAM Act at the national level. According to Blase, the organization arose to counter the Tea Party, and a growing anti-Latino, anti-immigrant sentiment within the Republican Party. However, many of its underlying precepts (anti-abortion, working for conservative Republican candidates) still places it on the conservative side of the spectrum.
