= Mike La Rosa =

American politician (born 1982)

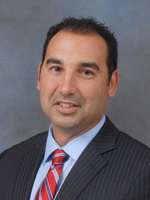

Member of the Florida House of Representatives from the 42nd district
- In office November 6, 2012 – November 3, 2020
- Preceded by: Redistricted
- Succeeded by: Fred Hawkins

Personal details
- Born: February 25, 1982 (age 44) Miami, Florida, U.S.
- Party: Republican
- Spouse: Holly La Rosa
- Children: 3
- Education: University of Central Florida (BA)

Mike La Rosa (born February 25, 1982) is a Republican politician from Florida. He was a member of the Florida House of Representatives from 2012 to 2020, representing the 42nd District, which includes parts of Osceola County around St. Cloud and eastern Polk County.

== History ==
La Rosa was born in Miami, and attended the University of Central Florida, where he graduated with a degree in interpersonal communication in 2002. After graduation, he formed La Rosa Development and La Rosa Realty with his brother, Joseph La Rosa.

== Florida House of Representatives ==
In 2012, incumbent Republican State Representative Mike Horner was seeking re-election, but he resigned from the House on September 24, 2012, after he was implicated during an investigation of a prostitution ring in Central Florida. On September 29, La Rosa was named as Horner's replacement in the newly created 42nd District, but because state law prevented changes in the ballot so close to the election, Horner's name, and not La Rosa's, was printed on the ballots. A contentious election ensued, with La Rosa squaring off against the Democratic nominee, Eileen Game. The Orlando Sentinel endorsed La Rosa, despite the fact that he was "hard to pin down on specifics...because he's still learning about them," because Game lived outside the district and had declared bankruptcy. In the end, La Rosa narrowly edged out Game to win his first term, defeating her with 50.4% of the vote and by 529 votes.

La Rosa was term-limited from the House in 2020, after serving four terms.

== See also ==
- Florida House of Representatives
