= Florida's 42nd House of Representatives district =

Florida district

Florida's 42nd State House of Representatives district
Representative
Felipe Sousa-Lazaballet; D–Orlando

Florida's 42nd House of Representatives district elects one member of the Florida House of Representatives. It covers parts of Orange County.

== Members ==
- William D. Gorman (until 1976)
- Toni Jennings (1976–1980)
- Thomas B. Drage Jr. (after 1980)
- Mike La Rosa (2012–2020)
- Fred Hawkins (2020–2022)
- Anna Eskamani (2022-2026)
- Felipe Sousa-Lazaballet (2026-Present)
