= New York Dream Act =

The New York Dream Act is 2019 New York State law extending eligibility for state-funded financial aid and scholarships to attend university to undocumented youth who arrived in the United States before the age of 18, a group often referred to as "DREAMers" and defined by the DREAM Act.

== Bill ==
The bill makes students who attended a high school in New York State and graduated or passed a high school equivalency test eligible to apply for taxpayer-funded financial assistance.

== Political debate ==
The Democratic Party was in control of both houses of the state legislature and held the Governorship when the bill was passed.

The New York Act is seen as part of the Democratic Party’s increasingly progressive left wing position on immigration. It was opposed by Republican politicians arguing that it diverts public funds from supporting the education of citizens of the United States.
