= Trail of Dreams 2010 =

U.S. walk celebrating passing of the DREAM Act

The Trail of Dreams in 2010 was a 1,500-mile (2,400 km) walk from Miami, Florida, to Washington, D.C., created by four students to support the passing of the DREAM Act. The act proposed federal legislation that would provide conditional resident status to undocumented immigrant students of good moral character. Inspiration for the name "Trail of Dreams" came from the Trail of Tears.

== Background ==
The Trail of Dreams walk began on January 1, 2010, in Miami, Florida. Four Miami-Dade County college students- Felipe Matos, Gaby Pacheco, Carlos Roa, and Juan Rodriguez- walked the 1,500 miles (2,400 km) to the United States capitol in Washington, D.C. The main purposes of the Trail of Dreams walk were to promote human rights, stop the deportations of current undocumented students and to support the DREAM Act. Three of the four students were brought to the United States illegally when they were children. They called for immigration reform and legislation that will allow eligible undocumented immigrants to obtain citizenship in the United States. The Trail of Dreams chose Washington, D.C., as their endpoint in order to request a meeting with President Barack Obama.

One of the walkers, Juan Rodriguez, outlined the Trail of Dreams with respect the rights of workers, fulfilling equal accessibility to education, having a just and humane pathway to full citizenship, and protecting the sacred bonds and unity of our families. The press referred to the four student walkers as "DREAMers" or "Dream Walkers".

== Activity ==
The Trail began in Miami, Florida, at the Miami Freedom Tower. It continued through a variety of small towns in city in Florida. The DREAMers took time to drive out to St. Augustine, Florida, to celebrate Martin Luther King Day. They traveled through Georgia and made a stop in Atlanta where they spoke with local politicians and the mayor. The Trail of Dreams traveled through South Carolina, North Carolina, Virginia, and into Washington, D.C. The four DREAMers arrived in D.C. on Wednesday, April 28, 2010. At 9:15 a.m. a press conference was held between East and West Executive Avenues near the White House. They were joined by immigration reform allies from the Florida Immigrant Coalition, Students Working for Equal Rights, Presente.org and others.

The Trail of Dreams then completed their journey with a walk to the National Press Club. This walk included many immigrant students and allies. The original goal to meet with President Barack Obama was not met by the end of the walk.

== Methods ==
The Trail of Dreams adhered to model of nonviolence as modeled by Martin Luther King Jr. and used a variety of methods to educate and promote their goals. These included organizing press conferences, fasting, peaceful civil disobedience actions throughout the country, calling and emailing members of congress, lobbying for immigration reform, and signed petitions (with over 30,000 signatures gathered throughout the 1,500-mile journey).

== Support ==
The Trail of Dreams found support from communities in every area they passed through on their 1,500-mile journey. Supporters provided food, shelter, encouragement and money. Many supporters participated in the walk with the four DREAMers. In Jupiter, Florida, around 70 people, many of them day laborers from Guatemala, joined the walk through their town.

The Lake Worth, Florida City Commissioner, Cara Jennings, declared January 6 as Dreamer's Day in honor of the four students visit to the area. In Atlanta, Georgia, the DREAMers were assisted by joined by over 200 people and the Georgia Tech marching band on the last 1.5 miles of their walk that particular day. They were also assisted by the local First Iconium Baptist Church which held a meeting that over 300 supporters attended.

The Trail of Dreams inspired five immigrant students from New York to embark on their own walk. The New York Trail of Dreams was a 250-mile journey that began on April 10, 2010. Five students walked through communities to raise awareness for the struggles of undocumented students and to promote the immediate passing of the DREAM Act. The Trail of Dreams walk was supported by several key organizations. They were a part of the Students Working for Equal Rights and the Florida Immigrant Coalition. Both organizations help fight for immigration rights in community integration, higher education and basic human rights.

The Trail of Dreams was also aided a great deal by the internet and social media. DreamActivist.org and Presente.org both utilized the internet to help foster a community support of multi-ethnic, immigrant youth. Twitter and Facebook were used to document the journey and to upload videos that helped connect outsiders to the journey for immigration reform.

== Opposition ==
On February 20, 2010, the DREAMers drove to Nahunta, Georgia, where they encountered a Ku Klux Klan organizing an anti-immigrant demonstration. The NAACP organized an opposition rally to the demonstration and the Trail of Dream walkers joined them in protesting. DREAMer Juan Rodriguez blogged about the experience: "Ultimately, the success of today was to be able to stand hand in hand with our friends from the NAACP; singing liberation songs together and acknowledging our united struggle for racial justice. We ALL deserve to be treated with dignity and respect."

On March 3, 2010, the DREAMers walked through Gwinnett County in Georgia. Gwinnett County is home to Sheriff "Butch" Conway, a supporter of the Immigration and Nationality Act Section 287(g). "287(g)" is a federal prevision authorizing local law enforcement to enforce federal immigration laws. Sheriff Conway has voiced that the accusations of racial profiling in order to uphold "287(g)" are false but acknowledges that the Gwinnett County Sheriff's office has the authority to work with U.S. Immigration and Customs Enforcement(ICE)on identifying illegal immigrants if brought into the county jail. The DREAMers believed that the federal provision led to the deportation of hundreds of immigrants in Gwinnett County over the course of three months. In response, the Trail of Dreams held a press conference outside of the Sheriff's office and requested a meeting with Sheriff Conway in order to denounce his involvement with "287(g)". The DREAMers were not granted access to a personal meeting with Sheriff Conway.

== Results ==
The Trail of Dreams walk ended in Washington, D.C., on May 1 but the four DREAMers continue to fight for the DREAM Act and for immigration reform. On May 24, 2010, the four students flew to Arizona to participate in an immigration march. On June 1 they attended a meeting with Joe Arpaio, Maricopa County's Sheriff. Sheriff Arpaio is well known for his strict adherence to immigration laws. The meeting was risky for the undocumented illegal immigrants in the Trail of Dreams group. Earlier in the morning Sheriff Arpaio submitted a tweet that read, "Just heard that some students from Fla. are coming to visit me and are self admitted illegal aliens". The meeting was peaceful and no legal action was taken against the undocumented students.

On Monday, June 28, 2010, the only documented immigrant, Juan Rodriguez, was granted a meeting with President Barack Obama to discuss immigration reform. Rodriguez joined a group of immigrant reform activists during his meeting with the President. According to Rodriguez, the President was both receptive and critical of the ideas and concerns brought forth. The Trail of Dreams garnered support from thousands of people and inspired many immigrant students to continue the pursuit of immigration reform. On Monday, September 20 a group of college students gathered at the Arizona state capitol building to persuade Senator John McCain to support the DREAM Act. In late November former and current undocumented immigration students fasted outside of Senator John McCain's Arizona office to again encourage him to support the passing of the DREAM Act.
