= Anthony Nieves =

American politician

Anthony Nieves is an American politician. He is a member of the Florida House of Representatives for the 47th district covering parts of Osceola and Orange counties. He won his open primary election for the district on August 18, 2026. He assumed office on November 3, 2026.
