= Florida's 47th House of Representatives district =

Florida district

Florida's 47th State House of Representatives district
Representative
Anthony Nieves; D–Kissimmee

Florida's 47th House of Representatives district elects one member of the Florida House of Representatives. It covers parts of Orange County and Osceola County.

== Members ==
- Paula Stark (2022 - 2026)
- Anthony Nieves (2026 - present)
