= DREAM Act =

American legislative proposal on immigration

- Nicknames: DREAM Act
- Sponsored by: Dick Durbin, Orrin Hatch

Legislative history
- Introduced in the Senate as S. 1291 by Dick Durbin (D–IL) and Orrin Hatch (R–UT) on April 25, 2001

The Development, Relief, and Education for Alien Minors Act, known as the DREAM Act, is a United States legislative proposal that would grant temporary conditional residency, with the right to work, to qualified applicants following illegal immigration to the United States as minors—and, if they later satisfy further qualifications, they would attain permanent residency.

In April 2001, United States senators Dick Durbin (D-Illinois) and Orrin Hatch (R-Utah) first introduced the bill in the Senate as S. 1291, but it did not pass. The proposal has since been reintroduced several times, and approved by a majority in the House and in the Senate, but not by sufficient margins to overcome filibusters by the Republican Party. The failure of Congress to pass the DREAM Act, despite bipartisan support, led the Obama administration to implement Deferred Action for Childhood Arrivals, which provided renewable, temporary protections for individuals that would have otherwise been protected by the DREAM Act.

== Requirements ==
The beneficiaries of the proposed DREAM Act would have to meet the following requirements to qualify:

- Not be inadmissible to or deportable from the United States, or be in Temporary Protected Status (Sec. 3(b)(1))
- Have proof of having arrived in the United States before age 16 (Dream Act of 2017, S.1615, Sec.3(b)(1)(B), and HR3440, Sec.3(b)(1)(B)).
- Have proof of residency in the United States for at least five consecutive years
- If a male born in 1960 or later, have registered with the Selective Service
- Be between the ages of 12 and 35 at the time of bill enactment
- Have graduated from an American high school, obtained a GED, or been admitted to an institution of higher education
- Be of good moral character

During the first six years, qualifying people would be granted "conditional" status and would be required to (a) graduate from a two-year community college or (b) complete at least two years towards a four-year degree or (c) serve two years in the US military. After this six-year period, those who meet at least one of these three conditions would be eligible to apply for permanent resident status. During this six-year conditional period, they would not be eligible for federal higher education grants such as Pell grants but they would be able to apply for student loans and work study.

If they have met all of the conditions at the end of the 6-year conditional period, they would be granted permanent residency, which would eventually allow them to become U.S. citizens. It is not known how many of those eligible would go on to complete the further requirements. One organization estimated that only 7,000–13,000 college students nationally can fulfill the further obligations.

=== For conditional resident status ===
The individual must:

- have proof that they entered the United States before the age of 16 and must have continuously lived in the country for at least 5 years.
- have graduated from a United States high school or obtained a GED in the US.
- demonstrate good moral character.
- pass criminal background checks

After having obtained and held conditional resident status, permanent residency may be granted if the following requirements have been met in a period of six years.

=== For permanent residency ===
The individual must:

- Have attended an institution of higher learning or served in the United States military for at least two years and if discharged, have received an honorable discharge
- Pass another series of background checks
- Continue to demonstrate good moral character

If these requirements are not fulfilled the conditional resident will lose their legal status and be subject to deportation.

== Background ==
Members of Congress have introduced several forms of this bill in both the House of Representatives and the Senate. Members in the House passed one such bill on December 8, 2010, by a vote of 216–198. Senators debated a version of the DREAM Act on September 21, 2010. A previous version of the bill, S. 2205, which required 60 votes to gain cloture, failed on a 52–44 vote in 2007, eight votes short of overcoming a filibuster by senators opposed to the bill.

The United States military faced challenges in enlistment, which in 2005 were described as a "crisis", though the economic downturn of 2007–2010 did away with many of the enlistment challenges. Immigrants without a United States Permanent Resident Card (also known as a green card) are not allowed to enlist. In 2007, several senior officials at the Department of Defense spoke in favor of promising resident status to members of the military as a means of boosting recruitment.

The bill also restores the option for states to determine residency for purposes of higher education benefits by repealing Section 505 of the Illegal Immigration Reform and Immigrant Responsibility Act (IIRIRA) of 1996 8 U.S. Code § 1623. The majority of states interpret this provision as disqualifying students with undocumented immigration status from certain higher education benefits such as in-state tuition rates. Some states have enacted laws aimed at making unauthorised state residents eligible for in-state tuition rates without violating this IIRIRA provision. Some students paying out-of-state tuition have filed lawsuits in these states, claiming state education officials violated this federal law.

== Legislative history ==
The original version of the DREAM Act was introduced on April 25, 2001, by Representative Luis Gutiérrez, Democrat from Illinois, as the "Immigrant Children's Educational Advancement and Dropout Prevention Act of 2001" H.R. 1918 during the 107th Congress. This bill received 34 cosponsors, and would have allowed undocumented immigrant students to first apply to be protected from deportation and then apply for and receive lawful permanent residency if they met the criteria.

One month later, on May 21, 2001, Gutiérrez's version of the bill was scrapped in favor of a more limited version entitled "Student Adjustment Act of 2001" H.R. 1918, introduced by Representative Chris Cannon, Republican from Utah. This version of the bill lowered age eligibility to 21 years of age and garnered 62 cosponsors. On August 1, 2001, a mirror bill to the "Student Adjustment Act of 2001" was introduced in the Senate by Senator Orrin Hatch, also a Republican from Utah. This legislation, S. 1291, was the first bill given the short title of "Development, Relief, and Education for Alien Minors Act" or "DREAM Act." Since that time the DREAM Act has been introduced in both the Senate and the House at various times.

The text of the bill was placed in various other immigration-related bills, including the Comprehensive Immigration Reform Act of 2006 (S. 2611) and the Comprehensive Immigration Reform Act of 2007 (S. 1348). With the failure of these comprehensive reform bills, Senator Richard Durbin, Democrat from Illinois, made its passage a top priority for 2007. In September 2007, Durbin filed to place the DREAM Act as an amendment to the 2008 Department of Defense Authorization Bill S. 2919. In light of the criticism, Durbin tabled the amendment in favor of a rewritten DREAM Act amendment to the Defense Bill. In consideration of their opponents, all language regarding in-state tuition was removed from the amendment and an age cap of 30 was put in place for potential beneficiaries. Military leaders embraced the bill, which included the promise of resident status to members of the military, as a means of boosting recruitment.

On October 18, 2007, Durbin, along with Republican co-sponsors Charles Hagel of Nebraska and Richard Lugar of Indiana, introduced the DREAM Act as S. 2205. Although nearly identical to the revised amendment to the Defense Bill, opponents continued to cite previous arguments. To bring the DREAM Act up for debate, a vote was scheduled on October 24 that would require a filibuster-proof count of 60 yes votes, but that failed. Senate opponents cited a variety of reasons for their opposition. Some labeled the DREAM Act as amnesty that would encourage chain migration and further illegal immigration in anticipation of new versions of the DREAM Act. Others stated that the DREAM Act, though worthy legislation, should be enacted only as part of a comprehensive immigration reform.

Senator Kay Bailey Hutchison, who had previously stated that she would oppose consideration of the DREAM Act, announced on the Senate floor that she had expressed reservations to Durbin and he had made a verbal commitment to work with her to make changes that she saw necessary to garner greater Republican support. In response, Durbin announced that the first amendment that would be considered, should debate of the DREAM Act begin, would completely re-write the bill in favor of the language that Hutchison suggested. According to her suggestions, students in the country illegally should be allowed to hold a temporary student visa with a renewable work permit instead of conditional permanent residency. Although 52 Senators voted in favor of considering the DREAM Act, this fell eight votes short of breaking filibuster and the legislation was not considered.

=== 2009 ===
The act was re-introduced in both chambers of Congress on Thursday, March 26, 2009, during the 111th Congress by senators Dick Durbin (D-IL), Richard Lugar (R-IN), Harry Reid (D-NV), Mel Martinez (R-FL), Patrick Leahy (D-VT), Joseph Lieberman (I-CT), Ted Kennedy (D-MA), and Russ Feingold (D-WI) and U.S. representative Howard Berman (D-CA). To date, 128 representatives and 39 senators (not including former senator Edward Kennedy) co-sponsored the bill. Under this version of the DREAM Act, immigrants could qualify in part, by meeting the following requirements:

- Be between the ages of 12 and 35 at the time the Law is enacted
- Arrived in the United States before the age of 16
- Resided continuously in the United States for at least 5 consecutive years since the date of their arrival
- Graduated from a US high school or obtained a General Education Diploma
- Good moral character

In addition to the temporary residency, students who qualified would also be entitled to apply for student loans and work study but would not be eligible for Pell grants. In certain circumstances, the person could lose temporary immigration residency if he or she did not meet the educational or military service requirement within the six-year time period or if they committed any crimes (other than those considered non-drug related misdemeanors) regardless of whether or not they had already been approved for permanent status at the end of their six years. If an individual were convicted of a major crime or drug-related infraction, (except for a single offense of possession of 30 g or less of marijuana) they would automatically lose the six-year temporary residence status and be immediately subject to deportation.

=== 2010 ===
The 111th Congress continued to consider the DREAM Act bill throughout 2010. S. 3827, a new version of the DREAM Act, includes numerous changes to address concerns raised about the bill. The DREAM Act, along with a repeal of "Don't Ask, Don't Tell", was incorporated into the National Defense Authorization Act for the Fiscal Year 2011. On September 21, 2010, the Senate filibuster of the bill was maintained in a 56–43 vote; it would have taken 60 votes to stop the filibuster and continue the progress of the bill. The following day, Durbin introduced the bill once again along with Richard Lugar. Only two senators co-sponsored the bill and it was defeated again.

Less than a month later, on November 16, President Barack Obama and top Democrats pledged to introduce the Dream Act into the House by November 29. The House of Representatives passed the DREAM Act on December 8, 2010, but the bill failed to reach the 60-vote threshold necessary to end debate on the Senate floor (55-41—Motion to invoke cloture on the motion to concur in the House amendment to the Senate amendment No. 3 to H.R. 5281). As a result, the DREAM Act failed to pass.

=== 2011 ===
On May 11, 2011, then Senate majority leader Harry Reid reintroduced the DREAM Act in the Senate. Some Republicans who had supported the bill in the past, including Sen. John Cornyn of Texas, Jon Kyl of Arizona, John McCain of Arizona, and Lindsey Graham of South Carolina, withheld their votes, objecting that such a bill should not be granted without increasing immigration enforcement. Reid indicated that he would consider adding a workplace enforcement measure in the DREAM Act that would require every employer to use E-Verify, the government's Internet-based work eligibility verification system. President Obama supported the bill as one of his efforts to reform the US immigration system.

In July 2011, the state of California enacted the California DREAM Act, giving undocumented immigrant students access to private college scholarships for state schools. In August, the state of Illinois authorized a privately funded scholarship plan for children of immigrants regardless of legal status.

=== 2012 ===
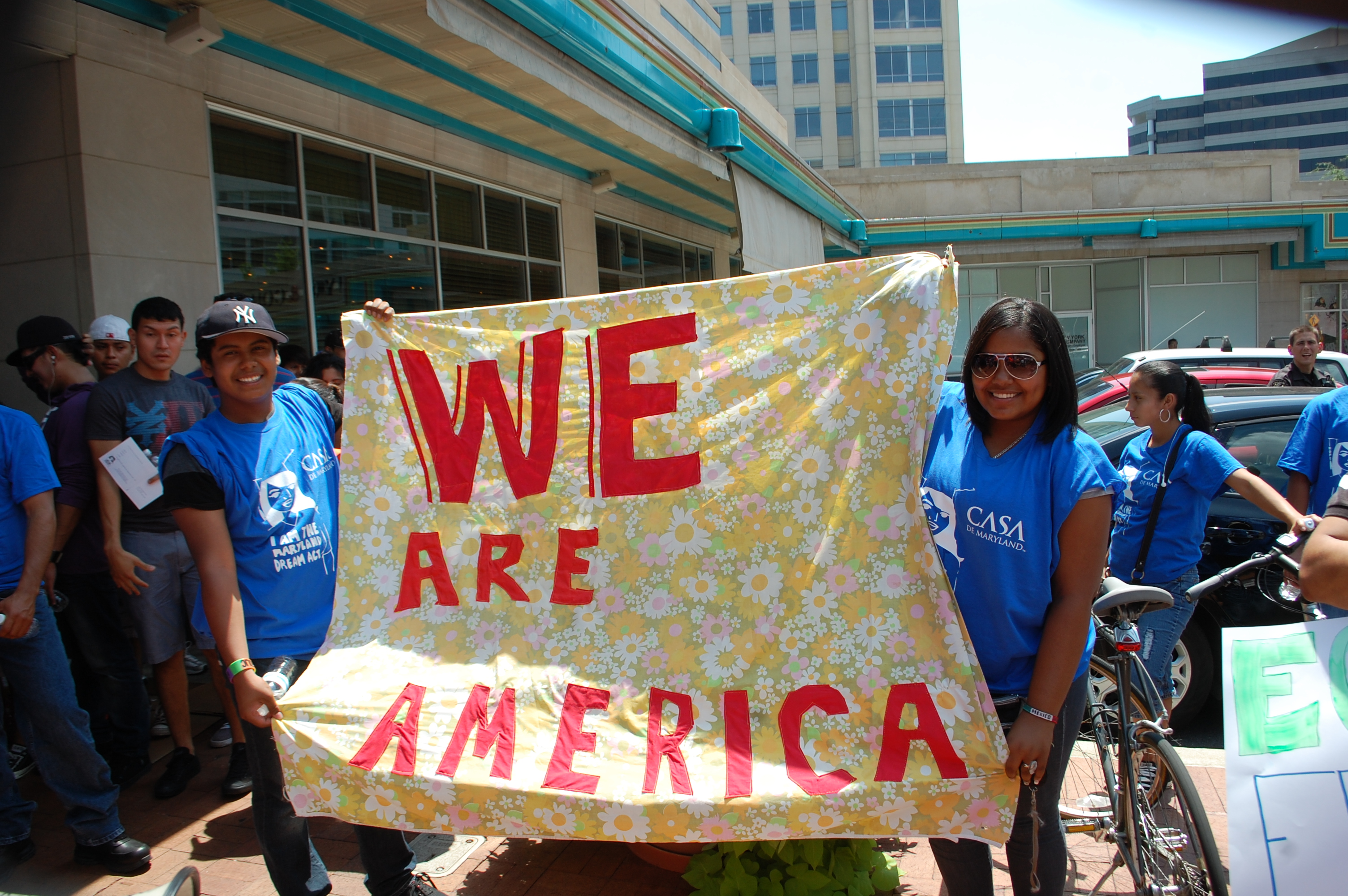
A protest in support of the DREAM Act in August 2012

On June 15, 2012, Barack Obama announced that his administration would stop deporting undocumented immigrants who match certain criteria included in the proposed DREAM Act. On August 15, 2012, the U.S. Citizenship and Immigration Services (USCIS) began accepting applications under the Obama administration's new Deferred Action for Childhood Arrivals (DACA) program. Thousands applied for the new program. Because DACA was designed in large measure to address the immigration status of the same people as the DREAM Act, the two programs are often debated together, with some making little distinction between them and others focusing on the difference between the DREAM Act's legislative approach in contrast to the implementation of DACA through executive action. As of January 2017, 740,000 people have registered through DACA.

=== 2017 ===
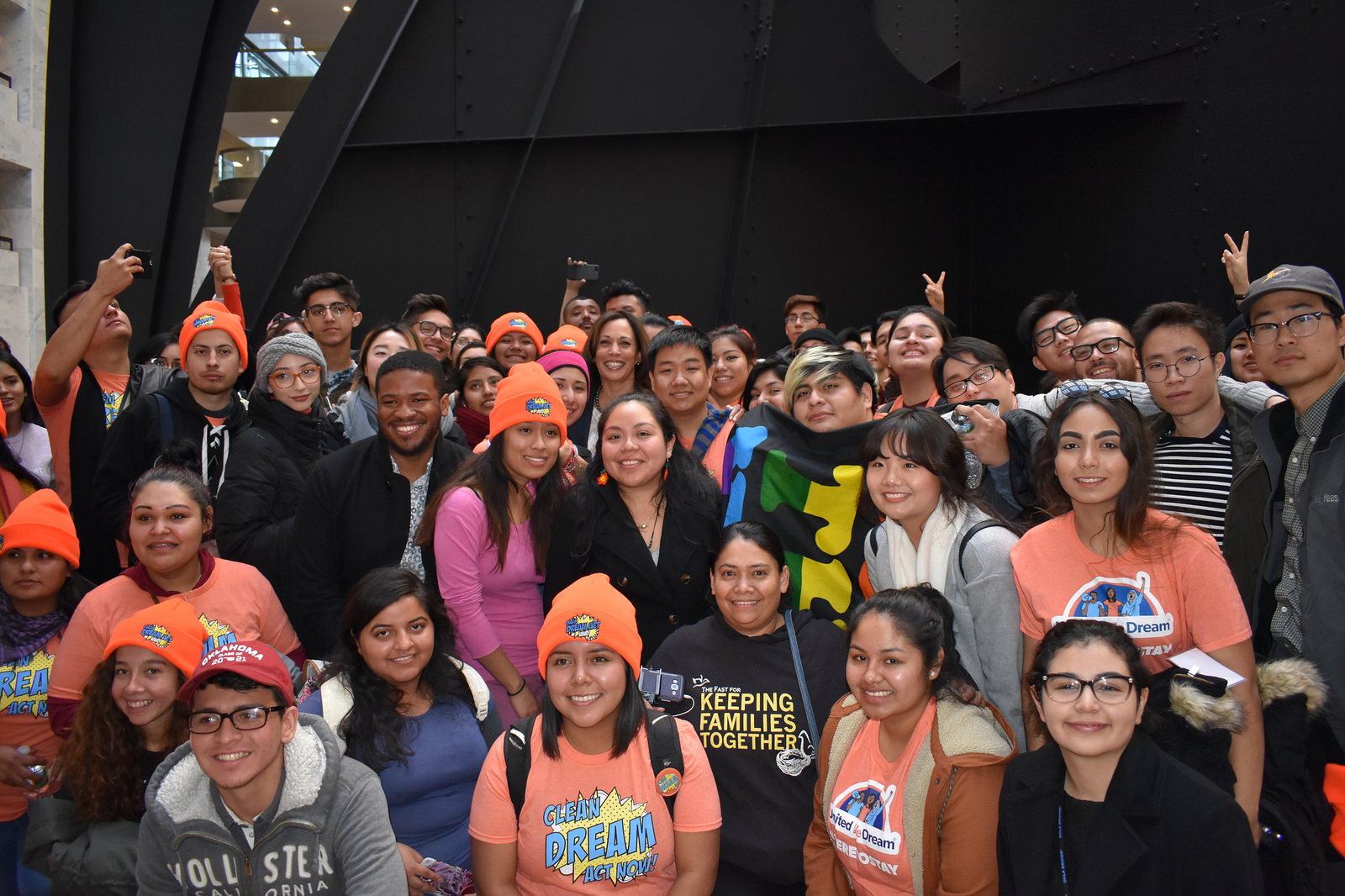
Senator Kamala Harris with DREAMers in December 2017

On September 5, 2017, the Trump administration rescinded the program, while pushing Congress to enact a replacement to the legislation prior to the elimination of DACA protections. The Dream Act of 2017 was introduced on July 20, 2017, by senators Lindsey Graham (R-SC), Dick Durbin (D-IL), Jeff Flake (R-AZ), and Chuck Schumer (D-NY). With potential to provide a direct process for gaining U.S. citizenship, this bipartisan act has been both championed and scrutinized, but again failed to pass. People eligible for citizenship are those who are in the country illegally, have DACA or temporary protected status (TPS) (people without lawful immigration status), and who graduate from U.S. high schools and attend college, enter the workforce, or enlist in the military. Several other bills were introduced in 2012 meant to protect undocumented youth, all similar to the Dream Act, but never becoming law.

The 2017 version of the act would adapt the current law in several ways. It would give DACA beneficiaries permanent resident status and TPS beneficiaries the opportunity to apply for this status. The pathway to U.S. citizenship would be first conditional permanent resident status for 8 years, apply for and receiving LPR status, spending 5 years in LPR status, and lastly applying for and receiving U.S. citizenship. The act would also terminate the deportation proceedings of anyone meeting the requirements of the Dream Act and those enrolled in elementary or secondary school over 5 years of age. It lastly would improve accessibility to college in-state tuition and financial aid for undocumented youth and immigrants.

=== 2019 onward ===
Much of the language of the DREAM Act was incorporated into the American Dream and Promise Act, which was first introduced in the 116th United States Congress.

== Impact ==
=== Economic ===
In a December 2010 report, the federal Congressional Budget Office and the Joint Committee on Taxation estimated that the November 30, 2010, version of the DREAM Act would reduce (federal) direct deficits by about $1.4 billion over the 2011–2020 period and increase federal government revenues by $2.3 billion over the next 10 years. Indirect federal costs (about 80% of the federal budget) and state and local tax impacts were not considered. However, the same report also notes that the act "would increase projected deficits by more than $5 billion in at least one of the four consecutive 10-year periods starting in 2021" (emphasis added). A study conducted by the Center for American Progress estimates that if passed, the DREAM Act would create 1.4 million jobs by 2030, primarily through the expected increase in educational attainment, earnings, and buying power for "DREAMers".

Luis Miranda, White House director of Hispanic media, has spoken in support of the 2010 version of the DREAM Act. He argues that passage of the act would make the U.S. more competitive in the global economy by allowing "these young people to live up to their fullest potential and contribute to the economic growth of our country." Miranda argues that the DREAM Act would not create an "amnesty program" because it requires a "lengthy and rigorous process" to be eligible for benefits, requiring, for example, a criminal background check and proof that the applicant has not committed any crimes that would make him ineligible for residency. Miranda also argues the act would not encourage more students to immigrate because it only applies to students who are already in the country. Furthermore, the act would create a waiting period before DREAM Act applicants could sponsor green card applications for their relatives. Miranda also notes that Defense Secretary Robert Gates has stated that the DREAM Act would provide an expanded pool of military recruits.

A 2010 study by UCLA's North American Integration and Development Center, an advocacy and research group that focuses on "transnationalism and globalization through action research", conducting "interdisciplinary research concerning the economic integration process between the United States, Mexico and Canada", produced two estimates of the income that would be earned by unauthorized immigrants who would be potentially eligible for the proposed DREAM Act benefits. The first estimate is based on analysis from a study by the Migration Policy Institute's National Center on Immigrant Integration Policy, an organization seeking to "advance the economic mobility and social inclusion of immigrants in the United States", which estimated that 38% of those eligible for the DREAM Act's benefits would actually obtain legal permanent resident status. In that scenario, the NAIDC estimates that DREAM Act beneficiaries would earn $1.4 trillion over a 40-year period. On the other hand, NAIDC estimates that if all those eligible for DREAM Act benefits successfully met the education or military service requirements and obtained legal resident status, they would earn $3.6 trillion over the same 40-year period. How many dollars they would use of available federal, state and local resources over the 40-year period was not estimated.

=== Education ===
Education is a major priority for the DREAM Act. In a research article written by Roger M. Mahony, it is stated that the DREAM Act aims to repeal a provision of law that penalizes states for offering these students in-state tuition rates. Depending on eligibility standards, the DREAM Act could benefit as many as 1.2 million young people in the United States, giving them an opportunity to reach their educational and economic potential.

== DREAMers movement ==
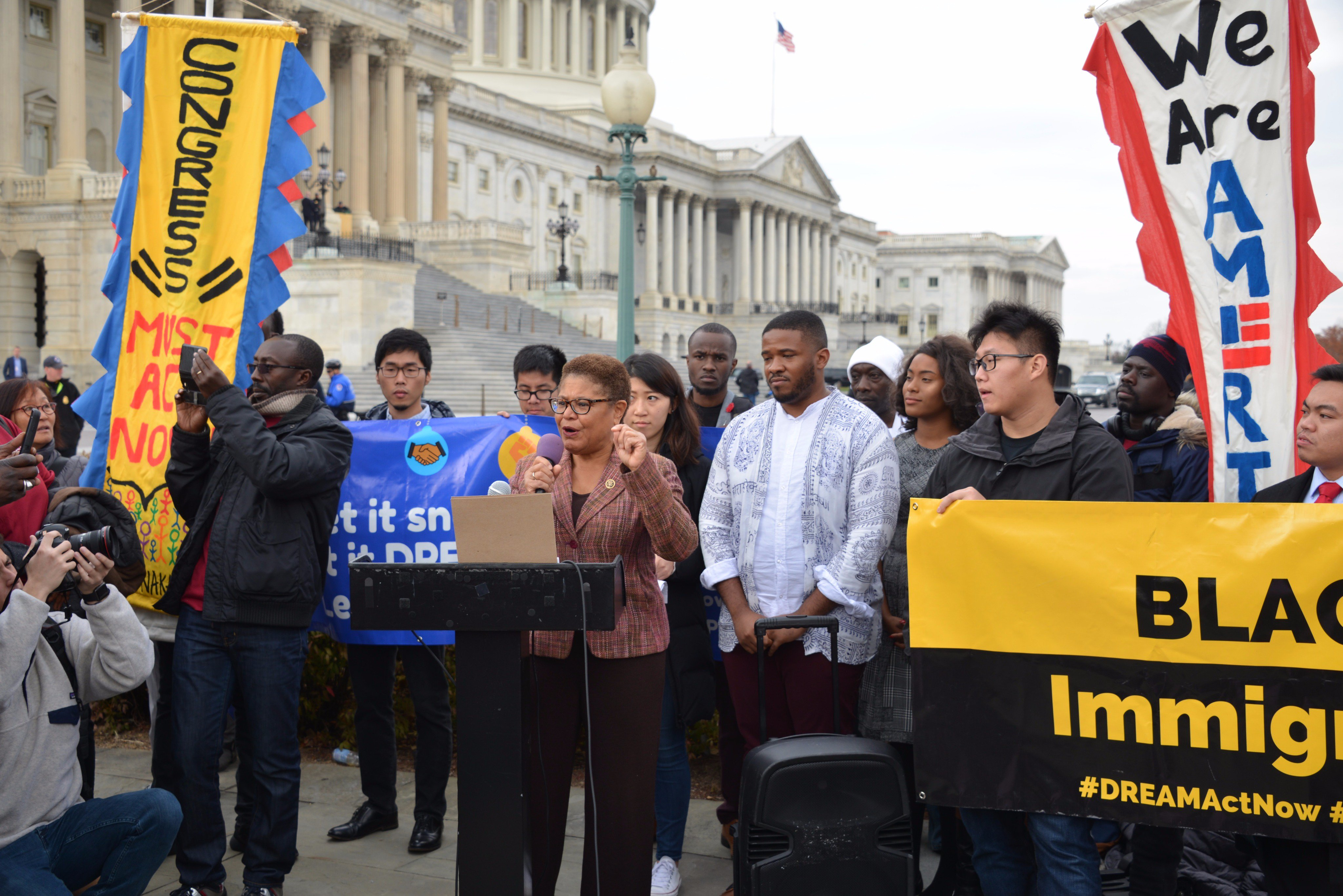
Representative Karen Bass speaking in support of DREAMers, December 2017

The DREAMers movement emerged during the time that the DREAM Act was being pushed in Congress. The individuals that make up the group are primarily undocumented students/youth. The DREAMers movement has been seen tackling issues with regard to immigration, education, and citizenship. In 2011, the Pew Hispanic Center conducted a survey that concluded that 96% of Latinos who are not U.S. citizens or legal residents supported the DREAM act. The DREAMers have partaken in many activists activities to demonstrate their support for the DREAM Act. On May 1, 2006, there was a demonstration that involved a collective group of students taking a stand to voice their concerns. There was an occasion on June 5, 2012, when DREAMers participated in a nonviolent civil disobedience which included picket-lines, sit-ins, hunger strikes, etc. There have been other scenarios throughout the country where undocumented youth have been actively involved in promoting the DREAM Act. Furthermore, the movement has had influence in other policies such as DACA (Deferred Action for Childhood Arrivals), an Executive Branch memorandum made by then-Secretary of Homeland Security Janet Napolitano on June 15, 2012, entitled “Exercising Prosecutorial Discretion with Respect to Individuals Who Came to the United States as Children,” creating a non-congressionally authorized administrative program that permitted certain individuals who came to the United States as juveniles and meet several criteria—including lacking any current lawful immigration status—to request consideration of deferred action for a period of two years, subject to renewal, and eligibility for work authorization. In December 2017, California Senator, Kamala Harris, expressed support for the DREAM Act on the basis that those benefitted by the act "...they study in our colleges, they serve in our military, they work in Fortune 100 companies. And they are contributing to our economy in a way that we all are benefiting.". In the same 2017 statement, Harris also said that if DACA recipients were to undergo deportation, "...it is estimated that California would lose $11 billion a year..." and that the U.S. economy would "...lose an estimated $460 billion over a decade.".

== See also ==
- Illegal immigration to the United States
- Immigration policy
- Plyler v. Doe
- Trail of Dreams 2010
- New York Dream Act
- Deferred Action for Childhood Arrivals (DACA)
- Deferred Action for Parents of Americans (DAPA)
- American Dream
