= 2020 United States House of Representatives elections in Florida =

- November 3, 2020

All 27 Florida seats to the United States House of Representatives
	Majority party	Minority party
Party	Republican	Democratic
Last election	14	13
Seats won	16	11
Seat change	▲2	▼2
Popular vote	5,469,164	4,942,287
Percentage	52.26%	47.23%
Swing	▼0.09%	▲0.13%

Republican
50–60%
60–70%
70–80%
80–90%
90>%
Democratic
50–60%
60–70%
70–80%

The 2020 United States House of Representatives elections in Florida were held on November 3, 2020, to elect the 27 U.S. representatives from Florida, one from each of the state's 27 congressional districts. The elections coincided with the 2020 U.S. presidential election, other elections to the House of Representatives, elections to the U.S. Senate, and various state and local elections.

In what was considered an upset, the Republican Party retook the two seats that it lost to the Democrats in 2018, expanding its 14–13 majority to 16–11.

== Statewide ==
Popular vote
Republican	52.26%
Democratic	47.23%
Other	0.51%

House seats
Republican	59.26%
Democratic	40.74%

== District 1 ==
2020 Florida's 1st congressional district election
- November 3, 2020
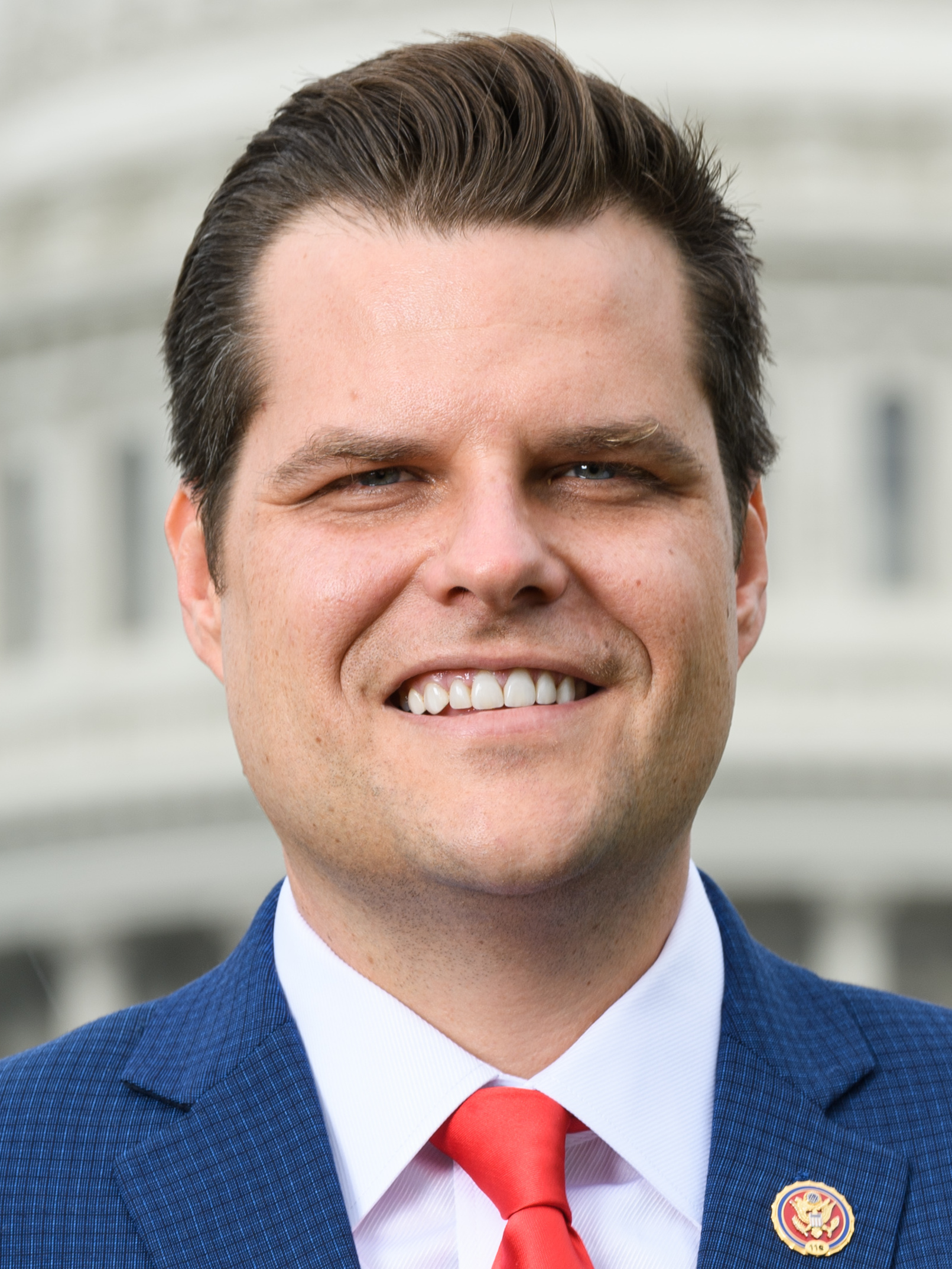

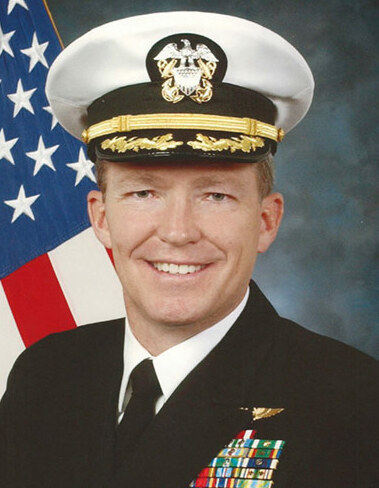
Nominee	Matt Gaetz	Phil Ehr
Party	Republican	Democratic
Popular vote	283,352	149,172
Percentage	64.6%	34.1%
- Gaetz: 40–50% 50–60% 60–70% 70–80% 80–90% >90% Ehr: 50–60% 60–70% 70–80% 80–90% >90%
U.S. Representative before election
Matt Gaetz
Republican
Elected U.S. Representative
Matt Gaetz
Republican

The 1st district encompasses the western Panhandle, and includes all of Escambia, Okaloosa, Santa Rosa, and Walton counties, as well as part of Holmes County. The district includes the cities of Pensacola, Fort Walton Beach, and Navarre. Republican Matt Gaetz, who had represented the district since 2017, was re-elected with 67% of the vote in 2018.

=== Republican primary ===
==== Candidates ====
===== Nominee =====
- Matt Gaetz, incumbent U.S. representative

===== Eliminated in primary =====
- Greg Merk, retired United States Air Force officer
- John Mills, retired United States Navy pilot and candidate for Florida's 1st congressional district in 2016 and 2018

==== Primary results ====
Republican primary results
Party	Candidate	Votes	%
Republican	Matt Gaetz (incumbent)	87,457	80.9
Republican	John Mills	10,383	9.6
Republican	Greg Merk	10,227	9.5
Total votes		108,067	100.0

=== Democratic primary ===
==== Candidates ====
===== Nominee =====
- Phil Ehr, retired United States Navy commander and candidate for Florida's 1st congressional district in 2018

=== Independent and third-party candidates ===
==== Independents ====
===== Declared =====
- Albert Oram, lawyer

=== General election ===
==== Predictions ====
Source	Ranking	As of
The Cook Political Report	Safe R	July 2, 2020
FiveThirtyEight	Safe R	October 15, 2020
Inside Elections	Safe R	June 2, 2020
Sabato's Crystal Ball	Safe R	July 2, 2020
Politico	Safe R	April 19, 2020
Daily Kos	Safe R	June 3, 2020
RCP	Safe R	June 9, 2020
Niskanen	Safe R	June 7, 2020

==== Results ====
Florida's 1st congressional district, 2020
Party	Candidate	Votes	%
Republican	Matt Gaetz (incumbent)	283,352	64.61%
Democratic	Phil Ehr	149,172	34.01%
Independent	Albert Oram	6,038	1.38%
Total votes		438,532	100.0
Republican hold			

===== County results =====
	Matt Gaetz Republican		Phil Ehr Democratic		Albert Oram Independent		Margin		Total
County	Votes	%	Votes	%	Votes	%	Votes	%	Votes
Escambia	93,078	55.10%	73,582	43.56%	2,268	1.34%	19,496	11.54%	168,928
Holmes	4,992	88.07%	587	10.36%	89	1.57%	4,405	77.72%	5,668
Okaloosa	78,035	67.93%	34,966	30.44%	1,877	1.63%	43,069	37.49%	114,878
Santa Rosa	75,075	70.87%	29,483	27.83%	1,380	1.30%	45,592	43.04%	105,938
Walton	32,172	74.56%	10,554	24.46%	424	0.98%	21,618	50.10%	43,150

== District 2 ==
2020 Florida's 2nd congressional district election
- November 3, 2020
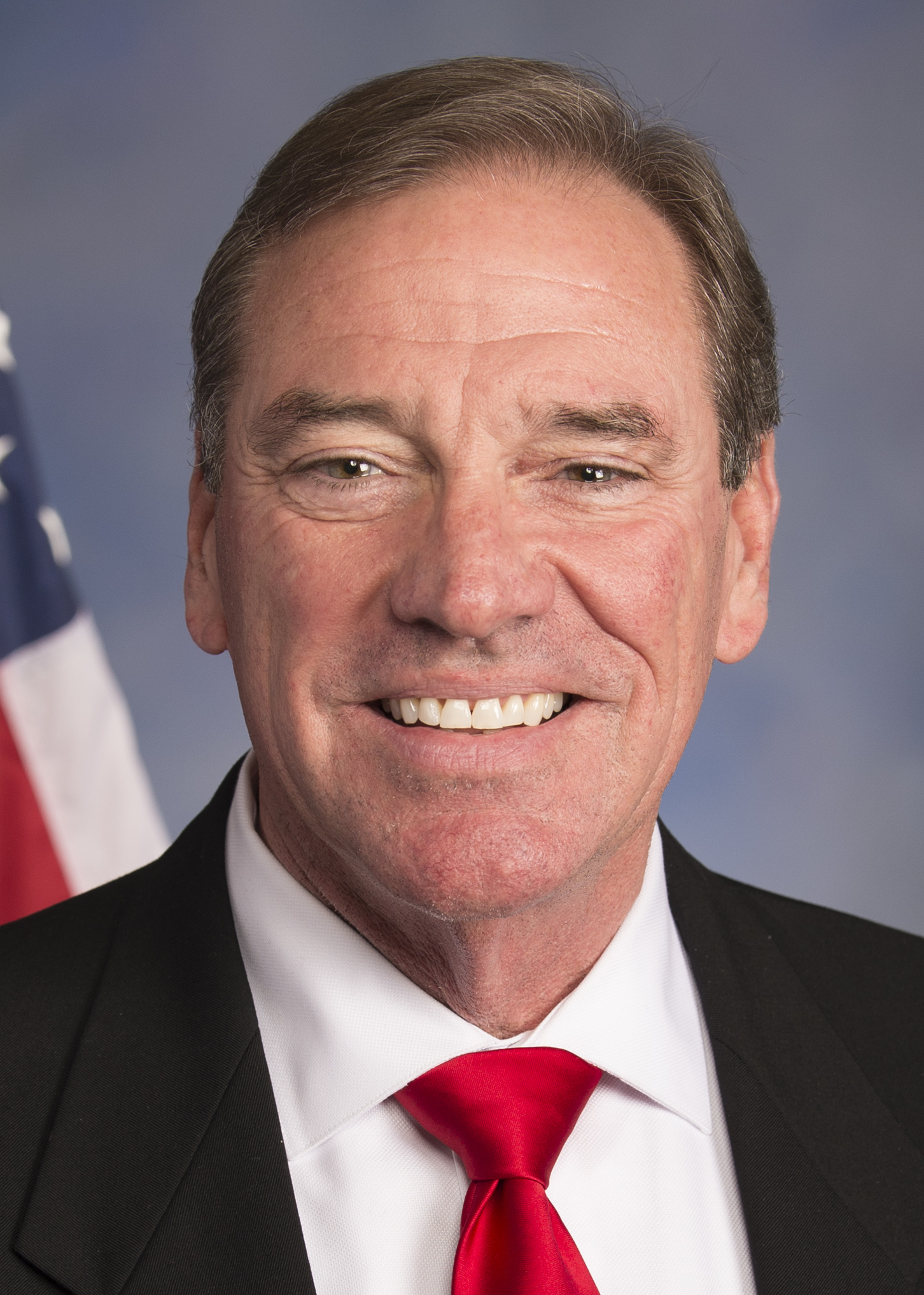
Nominee	Neal Dunn
Party	Republican
Popular vote	305,337
Percentage	97.86%
- Dunn: 60–70% 70–80% 80–90% >90% O'Connor: 60–70% 70–80% No data
U.S. Representative before election
Neal Dunn
Republican
Elected U.S. Representative
Neal Dunn
Republican

The 2nd district is located in northern Florida, taking in portions of the Panhandle and the Big Bend, including all or parts of 19 counties. The district includes the cities of Panama City, Marianna, and Lake City. Republican Neal Dunn, who had represented the district since 2017, was re-elected with 67% of the vote in 2018.

=== Republican primary ===
==== Candidates ====
===== Declared =====
- Neal Dunn, incumbent U.S. representative

=== Democratic primary ===
==== Candidates ====
===== Withdrawn =====
- Willie Anderson, priest
- Connor Oswald, teacher
- Kristy Thripp, activist

=== Independent and third-party candidates ===
==== Independents ====
===== Declared =====
- Kim O'Connor (write-in), candidate for Leon County commission in 2018

=== General election ===
==== Predictions ====
Source	Ranking	As of
The Cook Political Report	Safe R	July 2, 2020
FiveThirtyEight	Safe R	October 15, 2020
Inside Elections	Safe R	June 2, 2020
Sabato's Crystal Ball	Safe R	July 2, 2020
Politico	Safe R	April 19, 2020
Daily Kos	Safe R	June 3, 2020
RCP	Safe R	June 9, 2020
Niskanen	Safe R	June 7, 2020

==== Results ====
Florida's 2nd congressional district, 2020
Party	Candidate	Votes	%
Republican	Neal Dunn (incumbent)	305,337	97.86%
Independent	Kim O'Connor (write-in)	6,662	2.14%
Total votes		311,999	100.0
Republican hold			

===== County results =====
	Neal Dunn Republican		Kim O'Connor Independent		Margin		Total
County	Votes	%	Votes	%	Votes	%	Votes
Bay	76,997	98.26%	1,366	1.74%	75,631	96.51%	78,363
Calhoun	5,662	99.74%	15	0.26%	5,647	99.47%	5,677
Columbia	24,293	98.91%	268	1.09%	24,025	97.82%	24,561
Dixie	6,993	99.42%	41	0.58%	6,952	98.83%	7,034
Franklin	5,220	97.46%	136	2.54%	5,084	94.92%	5,356
Gilchrist	8,484	99.11%	76	0.89%	8,408	98.22%	8,560
Gulf	6,806	98.92%	74	1.08%	6,732	97.85%	6,880
Holmes	2,968	99.43%	17	0.57%	2,951	98.86%	2,985
Jackson	18,262	99.23%	141	0.77%	18,121	98.47%	18,403
Jefferson	586	98.16%	11	1.84%	575	96.31%	597
Lafayette	3,307	99.40%	20	0.60%	3,287	98.80%	3,327
Leon	47,294	93.35%	3,369	6.65%	43,925	86.70%	50,663
Levy	18,959	99.04%	183	0.96%	18,776	98.09%	19,142
Liberty	2,973	99.63%	11	0.37%	2,962	99.27%	2,984
Marion	24,888	98.50%	379	1.50%	24,509	97.00%	25,267
Suwannee	17,971	99.14%	156	0.86%	17,815	98.28%	18,127
Taylor	8,541	99.22%	67	0.78%	8,474	98.44%	8,608
Wakulla	14,514	97.76%	332	2.24%	14,182	95.53%	14,846
Washington	10,619	100.00%	0	0.00%	10,619	100.00%	10,619

== District 3 ==
2020 Florida's 3rd congressional district election
- November 3, 2020
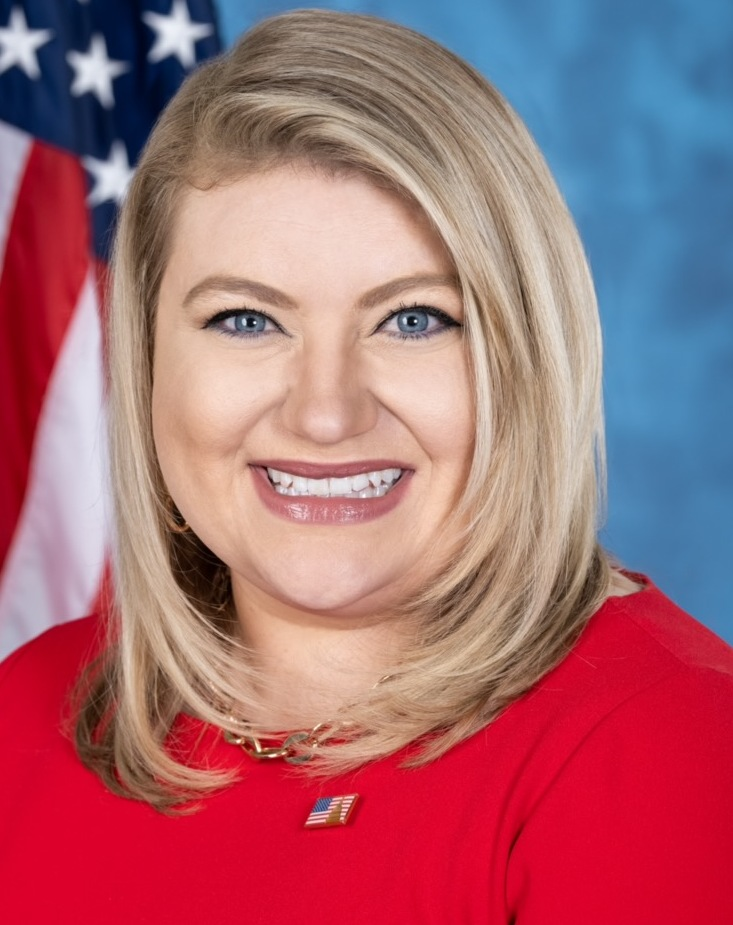

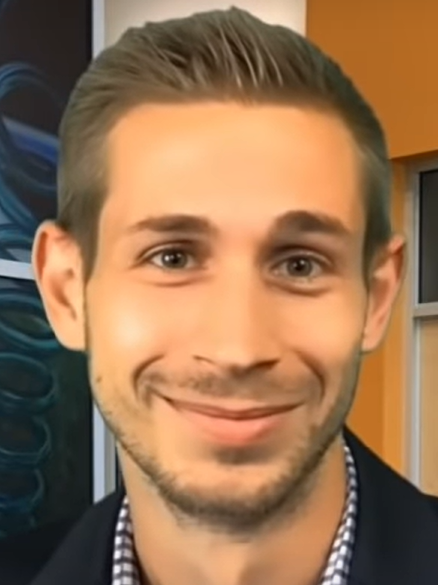
Nominee	Kat Cammack	Adam Christensen
Party	Republican	Democratic
Popular vote	223,075	167,326
Percentage	57.1%	42.9%
- Cammack: 50–60% 60–70% 70–80% 80–90% >90% Christensen: 50–60% 60–70% 70–80% 80–90% >90%
U.S. Representative before election
Ted Yoho
Republican
Elected U.S. Representative
Kat Cammack
Republican

The 3rd district is located in North Central Florida, and includes Alachua, Clay, Putnam, Bradford, and Union counties, as well as most of Marion County. The district includes the cities of Gainesville, Palatka, and Ocala. Republican Ted Yoho, who had represented the district since 2013, was re-elected with 57% of the vote in 2018. On December 10, 2019, Yoho announced he would not run for re-election, honoring his pledge that he would only serve four terms.

=== Republican primary ===
==== Candidates ====
===== Nominee =====
- Kat Cammack, deputy chief of staff for U.S. Representative Ted Yoho

===== Eliminated in primary =====
- Ryan Chamberlin, author
- Todd Chase, former Gainesville city commissioner
- Bill Engelbrecht, healthcare executive
- Joe Millado, businessman and former congressional aide
- Gavin Rollins, Clay County commissioner
- Judson Sapp, businessman and candidate for this district in 2018
- James St. George, physician
- David Theus, business consultant
- Amy Pope Wells, businesswoman

==== Withdrawn ====
- Ed Braddy, former mayor of Gainesville
- Kent Guinn, mayor of Ocala

==== Declined ====
- Rob Bradley, state senator
- Keith Perry, state senator
- Ted Yoho, incumbent U.S. representative

==== Endorsements ====
Kat Cammack

Federal officials

- Rand Paul, U.S. senator from Kentucky

State officials

- Denise Grimsley, former state senator (2012–2018) and state representative (2004–2012)

Organizations

- Police Benevolent Association (PBA) North Central Florida Chapter
- Republican Liberty Caucus
- Tea Party Express
- Tea Party Patriots Citizens Fund
Todd Chase

State officials

- Aaron Bean, state senator and former state representative (2000–2008)
- Keith Perry, state senator and former state representative (2010–2016)
Gavin Rollins

State officials

- Anthony Sabatini, state representative
Judson Sapp

Federal officials

- Vern Buchanan, U.S. representative (FL-16)
- John Rutherford, U.S. representative (FL-04)
- Cliff Stearns, former U.S. representative (FL-06) (1989–2013)

State officials

- Chuck Brannan, state representative
- Jennifer Carroll, former lieutenant governor (2011–2013)
- Jason Fischer, state representative
- Charlie Stone, state representative

Individuals

- Dana Loesch, former National Rifle Association of America spokeswoman and Breitbart News editor
- Roger Stone, political consultant and felon
James St. George

Federal officials

- Neal Dunn, U.S. representative (FL-02)

==== Polling ====
Poll source	Date(s) administered	Sample size (Note: Key: A – all adults RV – registered voters LV – likely voters V – unclear)	Margin of error	Kat Cammack	Ryan Chamberlin	Todd Chase	James St. George	Keith Perry	Gavin Rollins	Judson Sapp	Amy Pope Wells	Other	Undecided
Meer Research	August 6–8, 2020	317 (RV)	± 5.75%	25%	3%	6%	13%	–	11%	15%	3%	4% (Note: Bill Engelbrecht with 2%, David Theus with 1%, and Joseph Millado with 1%)	20%
WPA Intelligence (Note: Poll sponsored by Cammack's cmampaign)	June 16–17, 2020	405 (RV)	± 4.9%	10%	1%	5%	4%	–	1%	12%	1%	5% (Note: "someone else" with 5%)	60%
Americana Analytics/Judson Sapp (Note: Poll sponsored by Sapp's campaign)	Released April 20, 2020	400 (V)	± 5%	3%	–	–	–	–	4%	16%	–	– (Note: No other candidate exceeds 1%)	>70%
Clearview Research	December 16–17, 2019	401 (LV)	–	–	–	–	–	35%	–	9%	2%	6% (Note: Kent Guinn with 4%; Joseph Milado with 2%; Matthew Raines with no voters)	48%

Hypothetical polling

with Ted Yoho

Poll source	Date(s) administered	Sample size	Margin of error	Gavin Rollins	Judson Sapp	Amy Pope Wells	Ted Yoho	Undecided
Meer Research	November 20, 2019	533 (RV)	± 4.24%	8%	2%	3%	71%	16%

==== Primary results ====
Republican primary results
Party	Candidate	Votes	%
Republican	Kat Cammack	21,679	25.2
Republican	Judson Sapp	17,180	20.0
Republican	Gavin Rollins	13,118	15.3
Republican	James St. George	12,125	14.1
Republican	Todd Chase	8,165	9.5
Republican	Ryan Chamberlin	5,067	5.9
Republican	Amy Pope Wells	3,564	4.1
Republican	Bill Engelbrecht	2,001	2.3
Republican	David Theus	1,874	2.2
Republican	Joe Millado	1,168	1.4
Total votes		85,941	100.0

=== Democratic primary ===
==== Candidates ====
===== Nominee =====
- Adam Christensen, businessman

===== Eliminated in primary =====
- Philip Dodds, sales manager and candidate for this district in 2012
- Tom Wells, physicist and candidate for this district in 2018

==== Endorsements ====
Adam Christensen

Individuals

- Marianne Williamson, author, spiritual leader, and former 2020 Democratic presidential candidate
- Andrew Yang, entrepreneur and former 2020 Democratic presidential candidate

==== Primary results ====
Democratic primary results
Party	Candidate	Votes	%
Democratic	Adam Christensen	21,073	34.5
Democratic	Tom Wells	20,290	33.2
Democratic	Philip Dodds	19,730	32.3
Total votes		61,093	100.0

=== General election ===
==== Predictions ====
Source	Ranking	As of
The Cook Political Report	Safe R	July 2, 2020
FiveThirtyEight	Safe R	October 15, 2020
Inside Elections	Safe R	June 2, 2020
Sabato's Crystal Ball	Safe R	July 2, 2020
Politico	Safe R	April 19, 2020
Daily Kos	Safe R	June 3, 2020
RCP	Safe R	June 9, 2020
Niskanen	Safe R	June 7, 2020

==== Results ====
Florida's 3rd congressional district, 2020
Party	Candidate	Votes	%
Republican	Kat Cammack	223,075	57.14%
Democratic	Adam Christensen	167,326	42.86%
Total votes		390,401	100.0
Republican hold			

===== County results =====
	Kat Cammack Republican		Adam Christensen Democratic		Margin		Total
County	Votes	%	Votes	%	Votes	%	Votes
Alachua	52,914	37.86%	86,857	62.14%	-33,943	-24.28%	139,771
Bradford	9,965	75.11%	3,302	24.89%	6,663	50.22%	13,267
Clay	84,221	68.89%	38,040	31.11%	46,181	37.77%	122,261
Marion	46,097	62.94%	27,141	37.06%	18,956	25.88%	73,238
Putnam	24,916	69.69%	10,835	30.31%	14,081	39.39%	35,751
Union	4,962	81.17%	1,151	18.83%	3,811	62.34%	6,113

== District 4 ==
2020 Florida's 4th congressional district election
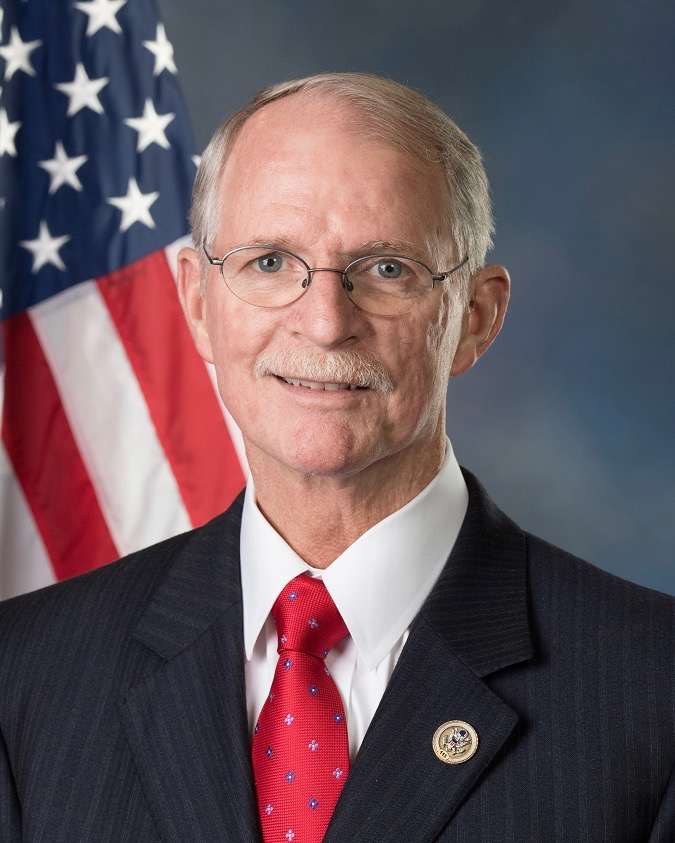

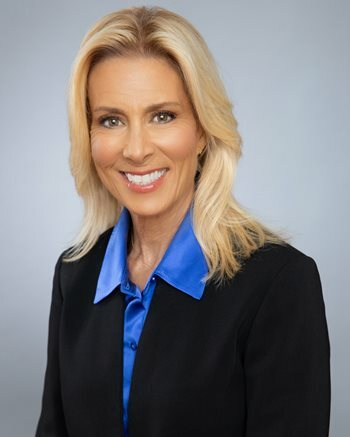
Nominee	John Rutherford	Donna Deegan
Party	Republican	Democratic
Popular vote	308,497	196,423
Percentage	61.1%	38.9%
- Precinct results Rutherford: 50–60% 60–70% 70–80% 80–90% >90% Deegan: 50–60% 60–70% >90% Tie: 50% No data
U.S. Representative before election
John Rutherford
Republican
Elected U.S. Representative
John Rutherford
Republican

The 4th district is located in the First Coast region, and includes all of Nassau County, as well as parts of Duval and St. Johns counties. The district includes the cities of Jacksonville, St. Augustine, and Fernandina Beach. Republican John Rutherford, who had represented the district since 2017, was re-elected with 65% of the vote in 2018.

=== Republican primary ===
==== Candidates ====
===== Nominee =====
- John Rutherford, incumbent U.S. representative

===== Eliminated in primary =====
- Erick Aguilar, professor and United States Navy veteran

==== Primary results ====
Republican primary results
Party	Candidate	Votes	%
Republican	John Rutherford (incumbent)	80,101	80.2
Republican	Erick Aguilar	19,798	19.8
Total votes		99,899	100.0

=== Democratic primary ===
==== Candidates ====
===== Nominee =====
- Donna Deegan, former news anchor for First Coast News

===== Withdrawn =====
- Monica DePaul, author

==== Endorsements ====
Donna Deegan

Unions

- AFL-CIO North Florida

Organizations

- Sierra Club

=== Independent and third-party candidates ===
==== Independents ====
===== Declared =====
- Gary Koniz (write-in), retired journalist and perennial candidate

=== General election ===
==== Debate ====
2020 Florida's 4th congressional district debate
No.	Date	Host	Moderator	Link	Republican	Democratic
Key: P Participant A Absent N Not invited I Invited W Withdrawn						
Key: P Participant A Absent N Not invited I Invited W Withdrawn					John Rutherford	Donna Deegan
1	Oct. 14, 2020	WJXT	Kent Justice		P	P

==== Predictions ====
Source	Ranking	As of
The Cook Political Report	Safe R	July 2, 2020
FiveThirtyEight	Safe R	October 15, 2020
Inside Elections	Safe R	June 2, 2020
Sabato's Crystal Ball	Safe R	July 2, 2020
Politico	Safe R	April 19, 2020
Daily Kos	Safe R	June 3, 2020
RCP	Safe R	June 9, 2020
Niskanen	Safe R	June 7, 2020

==== Polling ====
Poll source	Date(s) administered	Sample size	Margin of error	John Rutherford (R)	Donna Deegan (D)	Other	Undecided
University of North Florida	October 1–4, 2020	863 (LV)	± 3.3%	57%	38%	5% (Note: "Someone else" with 3%; would not vote with 2%)	0%
St. Pete Polls/Florida Politics	September 2, 2020	1,037 (LV)	–	62%	35%	–	3%

==== Results ====
Florida's 4th congressional district, 2020
Party	Candidate	Votes	%
Republican	John Rutherford (incumbent)	308,497	61.10%
Democratic	Donna Deegan	196,423	38.90%
Independent	Gary Koniz (write-in)	20	0.00%
Total votes		504,940	100.0
Republican hold			

===== County results =====
	John Rutherford Republican		Donna Deegan Democratic		Gary Koniz Independent		Margin		Total
County	Votes	%	Votes	%	Votes	%	Votes	%	Votes
Duval	169,852	57.51%	125,498	42.49%	17	0.01%	44,354	15.08%	295,367
Nassau	42,045	72.16%	16,225	22.84%	0	0.00%	25,820	44.31%	58,270
St. Johns	96,600	63.85%	54,700	36.15%	3	0.00%	41,900	27.69%	151,303

== District 5 ==
2020 Florida's 5th congressional district election
- November 3, 2020
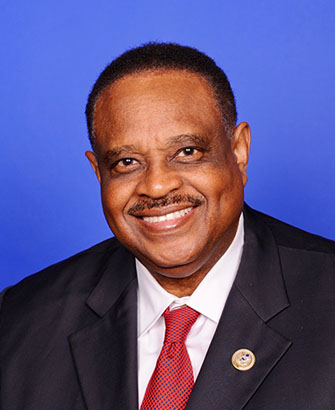

Nominee	Al Lawson	Gary Adler
Party	Democratic	Republican
Popular vote	219,463	117,510
Percentage	65.13%	34.87%
- Precinct results Lawson: 50–60% 60–70% 70–80% 80–90% >90% Adler: 50–60% 60–70% 70–80% 80–90% >90% No data
U.S. Representative before election
Al Lawson
Democratic
Elected U.S. Representative
Al Lawson
Democratic

The 5th district stretches along the northern border of Florida, and includes all of Baker, Gadsden, Hamilton and Madison counties, as well as parts of Columbia, Duval, Jefferson, and Leon counties. The district includes the city of Quincy, as well as parts of Tallahassee and Jacksonville. The district is majority-minority. Democrat Al Lawson, who had represented the district since 2017, was re-elected with 66% of the vote in 2018.

=== Democratic primary ===
==== Candidates ====
===== Nominee =====
- Al Lawson, incumbent U.S. representative

===== Eliminated in primary =====
- Albert Chester, pharmacist
- LaShonda "LJ" Holloway, former congressional aide and candidate for this district in 2016

==== Endorsements ====
Al Lawson

Organizations

- Humane Society of the United States Legislative Fund
- Planned Parenthood Action Fund
- Sierra Club

==== Primary results ====
Democratic primary results
Party	Candidate	Votes	%
Democratic	Al Lawson (incumbent)	52,823	55.7
Democratic	Albert Chester	24,579	25.9
Democratic	LaShonda "LJ" Holloway	17,378	18.3
Total votes		94,780	100.0

=== Republican primary ===
==== Candidates ====
===== Nominee =====
- Gary Adler, community activist

===== Eliminated in primary =====
- Roger Wagoner, businessman

==== Primary results ====
Republican primary results
Party	Candidate	Votes	%
Republican	Gary Adler	17,433	52.1
Republican	Roger Wagoner	16,012	47.9
Total votes		33,445	100.0

=== General election ===
==== Predictions ====
Source	Ranking	As of
The Cook Political Report	Safe D	July 2, 2020
FiveThirtyEight	Safe D	October 15, 2020
Inside Elections	Safe D	June 2, 2020
Sabato's Crystal Ball	Safe D	July 2, 2020
Politico	Safe D	April 19, 2020
Daily Kos	Safe D	June 3, 2020
RCP	Safe D	June 9, 2020
Niskanen	Safe D	June 7, 2020

==== Results ====
Florida's 5th congressional district, 2020
Party	Candidate	Votes	%
Democratic	Al Lawson (incumbent)	219,463	65.13%
Republican	Gary Adler	117,510	34.87%
Total votes		336,973	100.0
Democratic hold			

===== County results =====
	Al Lawson Democratic		Gary Adler Republican		Margin		Total
County	Votes	%	Votes	%	Votes	%	Votes
Baker	2,476	17.94%	11,329	82.06%	-8,853	-64.13%	13,805
Columbia	2,033	53.63%	1,758	46.37%	275	7.25%	3,791
Duval	127,311	66.83%	63,193	33.17%	64,118	33.66%	190,504
Gadsden	16,783	70.94%	6,875	29.06%	9,908	41.88%	23,658
Hamilton	2,133	37.34%	3,579	62.66%	-1,446	-25.32%	5,712
Jefferson	3,800	49.73%	3,841	50.27%	-41	-0.54%	7,641
Leon	60,937	73.76%	21,674	26.24%	39,263	47.53%	82,611
Florida	3,990	43.13%	5,261	56.87%	-1,271	-13.74%	9,251

== District 6 ==
2020 Florida's 6th congressional district election
- November 3, 2020
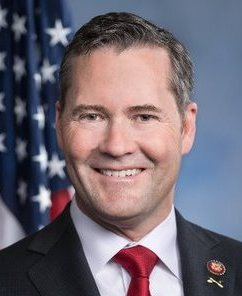

Nominee	Mike Waltz	Clint Curtis
Party	Republican	Democratic
Popular vote	265,393	172,305
Percentage	60.64%	39.36%
- Precinct results Waltz: 50–60% 60–70% 70–80% 80–90% Curtis: 50–60% 60–70% 70–80% 80–90% >90% No data
U.S. Representative before election
Michael Waltz
Republican
Elected U.S. Representative
Michael Waltz
Republican

The 6th district encompasses the Halifax area, including all of Flagler and Volusia counties, as well as parts of St. Johns and Lake counties. The district includes the cities of Daytona Beach, Palm Coast, and DeLand. Republican Michael Waltz, who had represented the district since 2019, was elected with 56% of the vote in 2018.

=== Republican primary ===
==== Candidates ====
===== Nominee =====
- Michael Waltz, incumbent U.S. representative

=== Democratic primary ===
==== Candidates ====
===== Nominee =====
- Clint Curtis, lawyer and nominee for California's 4th congressional district in 2010

===== Eliminated in primary =====
- Richard Thripp, professor

==== Primary results ====
Democratic primary results
Party	Candidate	Votes	%
Democratic	Clint Curtis	30,449	51.5
Democratic	Richard Thripp	28,661	48.5
Total votes		59,110	100.0

=== Independent and third-party candidates ===
==== Independents ====
===== Declared =====
- Gerry Nolan (write-in), businessman

==== Independent Democrats ====
===== Declared =====
- Alan Grayson (write-in), former U.S. representative for Florida's 9th congressional district and candidate for U.S. Senate in 2016

=== General election ===
==== Predictions ====
Source	Ranking	As of
The Cook Political Report	Safe R	July 2, 2020
FiveThirtyEight	Safe R	October 15, 2020
Inside Elections	Safe R	June 2, 2020
Sabato's Crystal Ball	Safe R	July 2, 2020
Politico	Likely R	April 19, 2020
Daily Kos	Safe R	June 3, 2020
RCP	Safe R	June 9, 2020
Niskanen	Safe R	June 7, 2020

==== Results ====
Florida's 6th congressional district, 2020
Party	Candidate	Votes	%
Republican	Michael Waltz (incumbent)	265,393	60.64%
Democratic	Clint Curtis	172,305	39.36%
Independent	Gerry Nolan (write-in)	112	0.01%
Democratic	Alan Grayson (write-in)	46	0.01%
Total votes		437,856	100.0
Republican hold			

===== County results =====
	Michael Waltz Republican		Clint Curtis Democratic		Gerry Nolan Independent		Alan Grayson Democratic		Margin		Total
County	Votes	%	Votes	%	Votes	%	Votes	%	Votes	%	Votes
Flagler	43,346	62.26%	26,257	37.72%	4	0.01%	10	0.01%	17,089	24.55	69,617
Lake	32,302	66.32%	16,386	33.64%	16	0.03%	4	0.01%	15,916	32.68%	48,708
St. Johns	14,851	65.80%	7,717	34.19%	2	0.01%	1	0.00%	7,134	31.61%	22,571
Volusia	174,894	58.89%	121,945	41.06%	90	0.03%	31	0.01%	52,949	17.83%	296,960

== District 7 ==
2020 Florida's 7th congressional district election
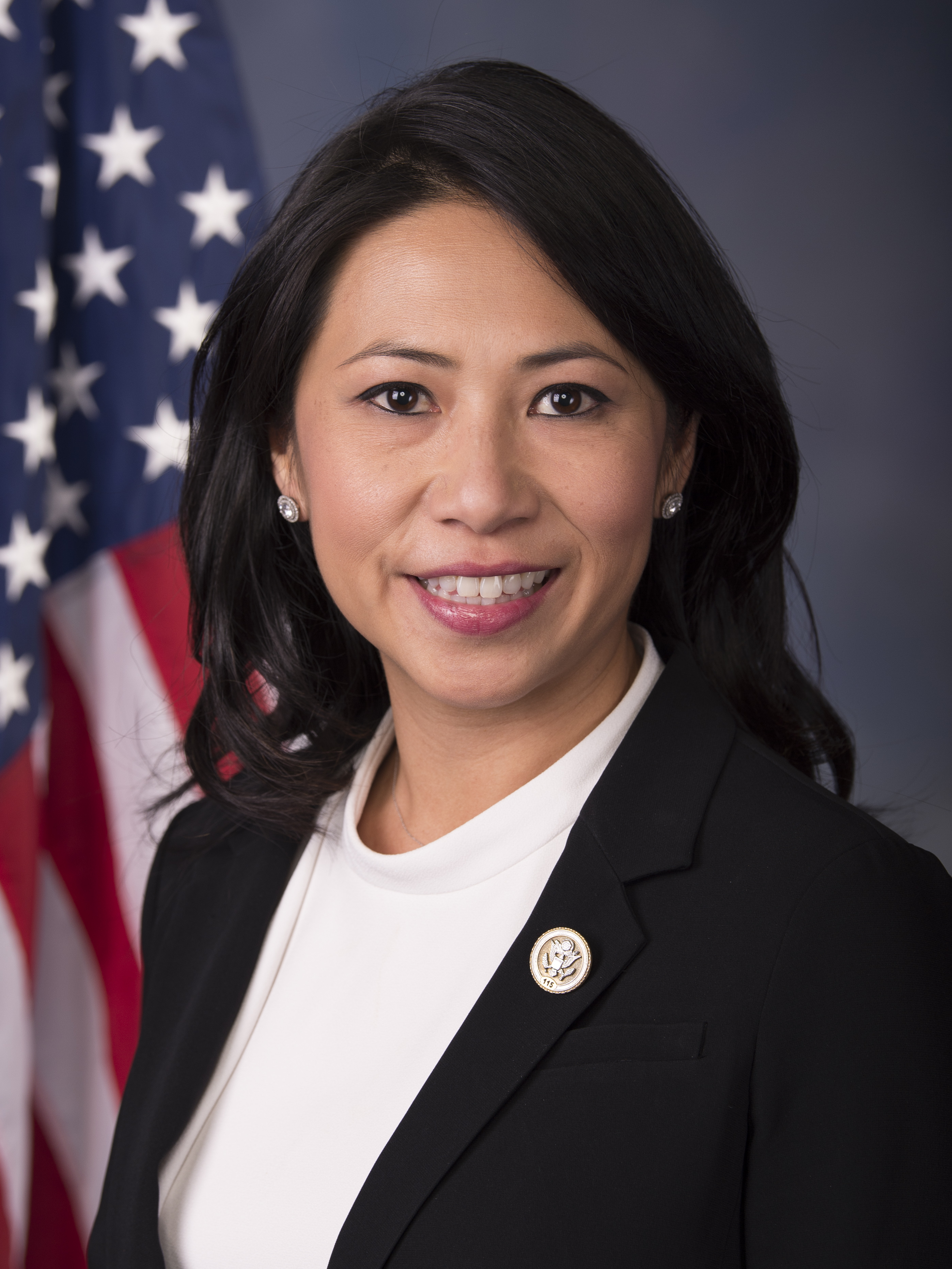

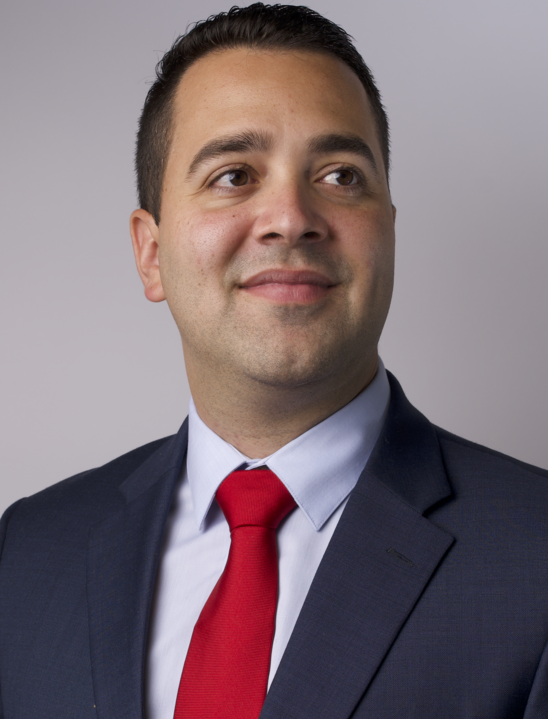
Nominee	Stephanie Murphy	Leo Valentín
Party	Democratic	Republican
Popular vote	224,946	175,750
Percentage	55.3%	43.2%
- Precinct results Murphy: 40–50% 50–60% 60–70% 70–80% 80–90% Valentín: 40–50% 50–60% 60–70% 70–80% No data
U.S. Representative before election
Stephanie Murphy
Democratic
Elected U.S. Representative
Stephanie Murphy
Democratic

The 7th district is located in Central Florida, and includes all of Seminole County and part of Orange County. The district includes the cities of Orlando, Sanford, and Winter Park. Democrat Stephanie Murphy, who had represented the district since 2017, was re-elected with 57% of the vote in 2018.

This district was included on the list of Democratic-held seats the National Republican Congressional Committee targeted in 2020.

=== Democratic primary ===
==== Candidates ====
===== Nominee =====
- Stephanie Murphy, incumbent U.S. representative

==== Endorsements ====
Stephanie Murphy

Organizations

- Brady Campaign
- EMILY's List
- End Citizens United
- NARAL Pro-Choice America
- Planned Parenthood Action Fund

=== Republican primary ===
==== Candidates ====
===== Nominee =====
- Leo Valentín, radiologist

===== Eliminated in primary =====
- Richard Goble, businessman
- Yukong Zhao, real estate investor

===== Withdrawn =====
- Jan Edwards, businesswoman

==== Primary results ====
Republican primary results
Party	Candidate	Votes	%
Republican	Leo Valentín	19,841	38.6
Republican	Richard Goble	19,187	37.4
Republican	Yukong Zhao	12,330	24.0
Total votes		51,358	100.0

==== Independents and third-party candidates ====
===== Declared =====
- William Garlington, businessman and former actor

=== General election ===
==== Debate ====
2020 Florida's 7th congressional district debate
No.	Date	Host	Moderator	Link	Democratic	Republican	Independent
Key: P Participant A Absent N Not invited I Invited W Withdrawn							
Key: P Participant A Absent N Not invited I Invited W Withdrawn					Stephanie Murphy	Leo Valentin	William Garlington
1	Oct. 13, 2020	WESH	Greg Fox		P	P	P

==== Predictions ====
Source	Ranking	As of
The Cook Political Report	Safe D	July 2, 2020
FiveThirtyEight	Safe D	October 15, 2020
Inside Elections	Safe D	June 2, 2020
Sabato's Crystal Ball	Safe D	July 2, 2020
Politico	Likely D	April 19, 2020
Daily Kos	Safe D	June 3, 2020
RCP	Likely D	June 9, 2020
Niskanen	Safe D	June 7, 2020

==== Polling ====
Hypothetical polling

with Richard Goble, Joel Greenberg (R), Stephanie Murphy and Leo Valentin

Poll source	Date(s) administered	Sample size	Margin of error	Richard Goble (R)	Joel Greenberg (R)	Stephanie Murphy (D)	Leo Valentín (R)	Undecided
Gravis Marketing/Orlando Politics	Jan 2–3, 2020	813 (RV)	± 3.4%	4% (Note: Standard VI response)	20%	43%	4%	29%

with Joel Greenberg and Stephanie Murphy

Poll source	Date(s) administered	Sample size	Margin of error	Joel Greenberg (R)	Stephanie Murphy (D)	Undecided
Gravis Marketing/Orlando Politics	Jan 2–3, 2020	813 (RV)	± 3.4%	42% (Note: Response after pollster provided respondents with talking points about Greenberg)	43%	15%

==== Results ====
Florida's 7th congressional district, 2020
Party	Candidate	Votes	%
Democratic	Stephanie Murphy (incumbent)	224,946	55.34%
Republican	Leo Valentín	175,750	43.24%
Independent	William Garlington	5,753	1.42%
Total votes		406,449	100.0
Democratic hold			

===== County results =====
	Stephanie Murphy Democratic		Leo Valentín Republican		William Garlington Independent		Margin		Total
County	Votes	%	Votes	%	Votes	%	Votes	%	Votes
Orange	92,639	61.28%	56,280	37.23%	2,242	1.48%	36,359	24.05%	151,161
Seminole	132,307	51.83%	119,470	46.80%	3,511	1.38%	12,837	5.03%	255,288

== District 8 ==
2020 Florida's 8th congressional district election
- November 3, 2020
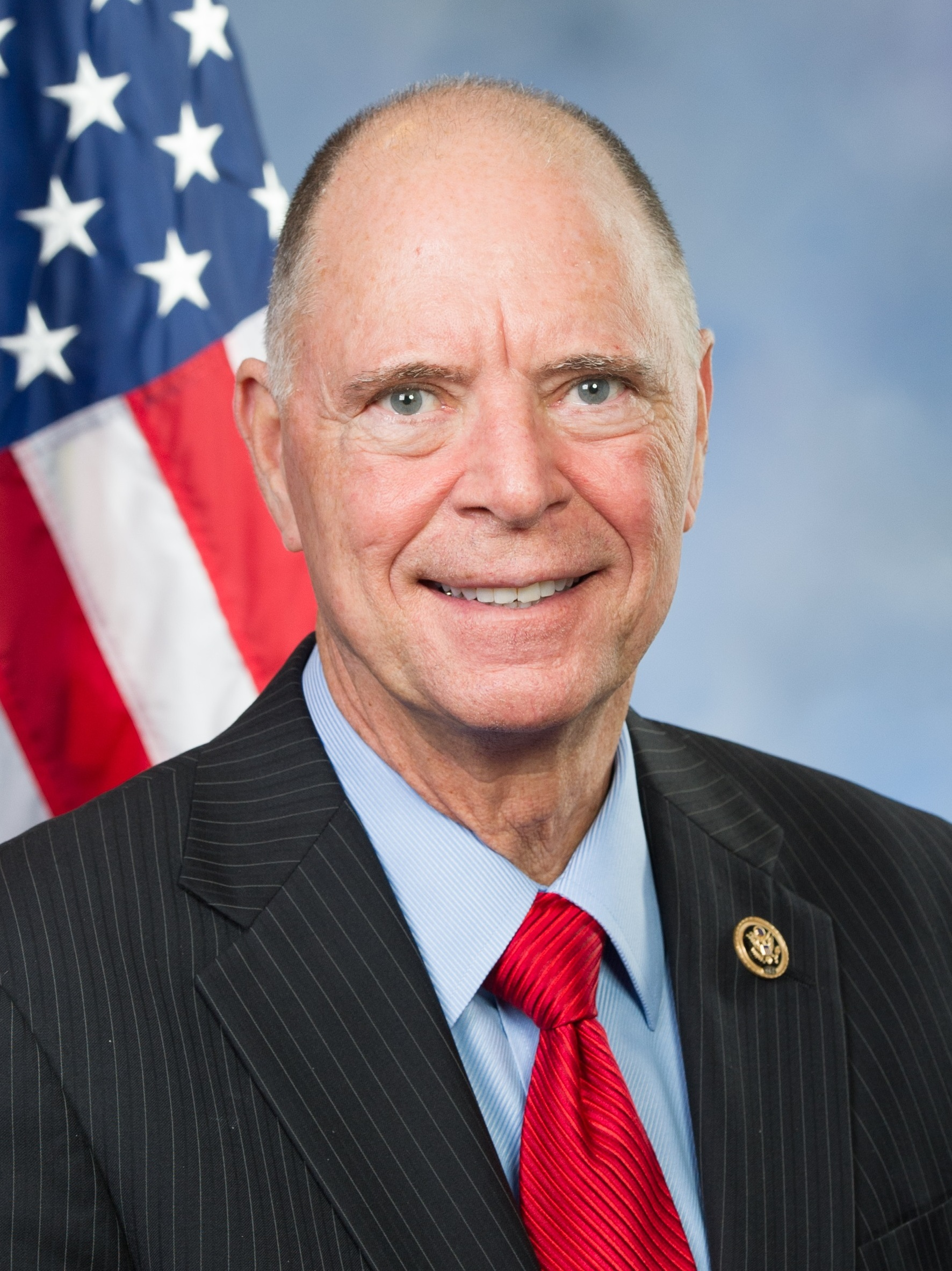

Nominee	Bill Posey	Jim Kennedy
Party	Republican	Democratic
Popular vote	282,093	177,695
Percentage	61.36%	38.64%
- Precinct results Posey: 50–60% 60–70% 70–80% 80–90% >90% Kennedy: 50–60% 60–70% 70–80% 80–90% >90% No data
U.S. Representative before election
Bill Posey
Republican
Elected U.S. Representative
Bill Posey
Republican

The 8th district encompasses the Space Coast, and includes all of Indian River and Brevard counties, as well as part of Orange County. The district includes the cities of Melbourne, Palm Bay, and Titusville. Republican Bill Posey, who had represented the district since 2009, was re-elected with 60% of the vote in 2018.

=== Republican primary ===
==== Candidates ====
===== Nominee =====
- Bill Posey, incumbent U.S. representative

===== Eliminated in primary =====
- Scott Caine, retired U.S. Air Force colonel

===== Disqualified =====
- Angela Walls-Windhauser, perennial candidate

==== Primary results ====
Republican primary results
Party	Candidate	Votes	%
Republican	Bill Posey (incumbent)	54,861	62.5
Republican	Scott Caine	32,952	37.5
Total votes		87,813	100.0

=== Democratic primary ===
==== Candidates ====
===== Nominee =====
- Jim Kennedy, electrical engineer

===== Withdrawn =====
- Tiffany Patti, activist

===== Disqualified =====
- Hicham Ammi, customer service manager
- Jason Williams, engineer

==== Endorsements ====
Jim Kennedy

Organizations

- Sierra Club

=== Independent and third-party candidates ===
==== Independents ====
===== Withdrawn =====
- Russell Cyphers, former federal investigator for the departments of Treasury and Labor

=== General election ===
==== Predictions ====
Source	Ranking	As of
The Cook Political Report	Safe R	July 2, 2020
FiveThirtyEight	Safe R	October 15, 2020
Inside Elections	Safe R	June 2, 2020
Sabato's Crystal Ball	Safe R	July 2, 2020
Politico	Safe R	April 19, 2020
Daily Kos	Safe R	June 3, 2020
RCP	Safe R	June 9, 2020
Niskanen	Safe R	June 7, 2020

==== Results ====
Florida's 8th congressional district, 2020
Party	Candidate	Votes	%
Republican	Bill Posey (incumbent)	282,093	61.36%
Democratic	Jim Kennedy	177,695	38.64%
Total votes		459,788	100.0
Republican hold			

===== County results =====
	Bill Posey Republican		Jim Kennedy Democratic		Margin		Total
County	Votes	%	Votes	%	Votes	%	Votes
Brevard	215,686	60.68%	139,769	39.32%	75,917	21.36%	355,455
Indian River	61,055	63.84%	34,585	36.16%	26,470	27.68%	95,640
Orange	5,352	61.57%	3,341	38.43%	2,011	23.13%	8,693

== District 9 ==
2020 Florida's 9th congressional district election
- November 3, 2020
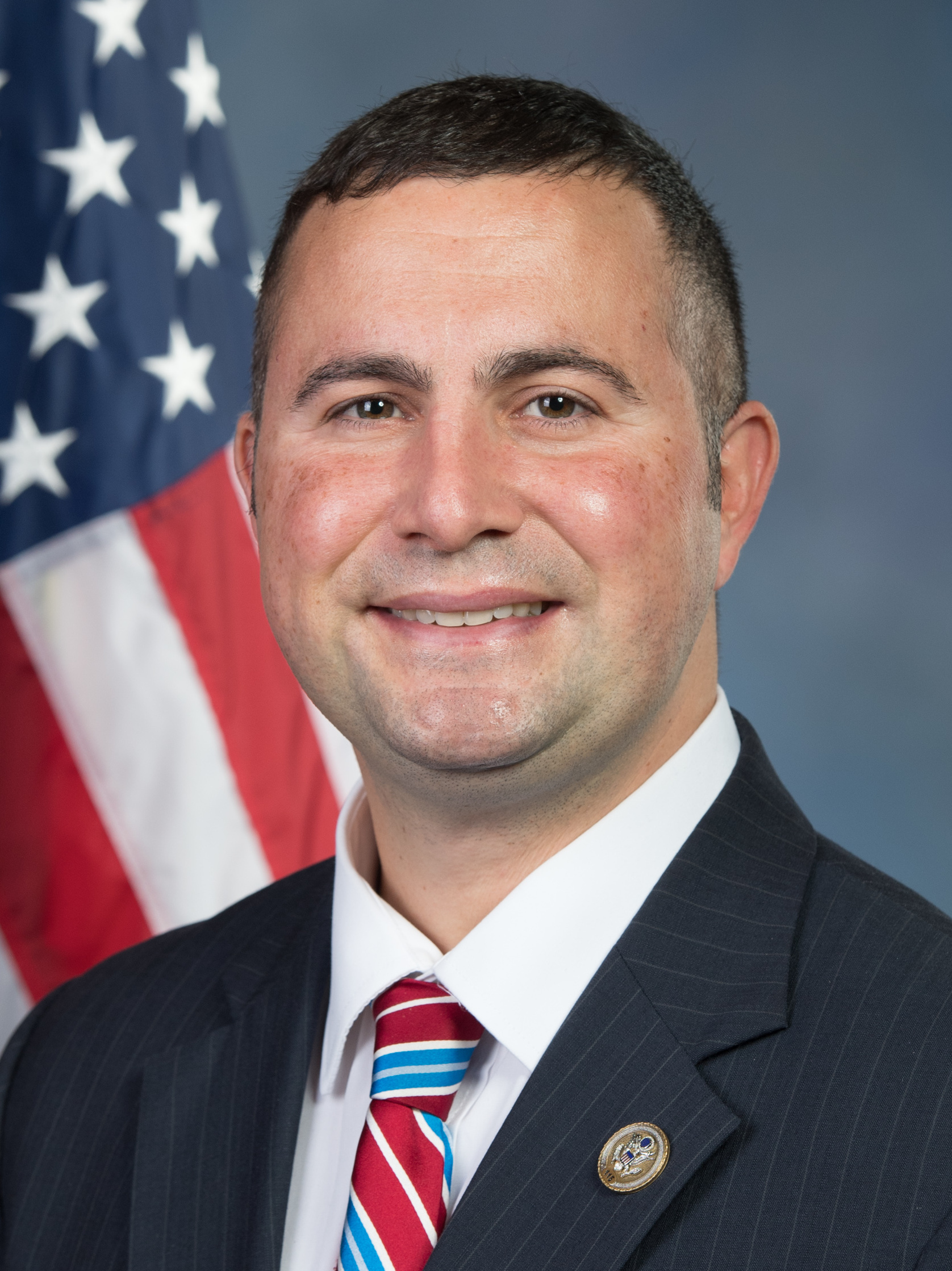

Nominee	Darren Soto	Bill Olson
Party	Democratic	Republican
Popular vote	240,724	188,889
Percentage	56.02%	43.96%
- Precinct results Soto: 50–60% 60–70% 70–80% 80–90% >90% Olson: 50–60% 60–70% 70–80% 80–90% >90% Tie: 50% No data
U.S. Representative before election
Darren Soto
Democratic
Elected U.S. Representative
Darren Soto
Democratic

The 9th district is located in Central Florida, and encompasses all of Osceola County, as well as parts of Orange and Polk counties. The district includes the cities of Kissimmee and St. Cloud, as well as eastern Orlando. Democrat Darren Soto, who had represented the district since 2017, was re-elected with 58% of the vote in 2018.

=== Democratic primary ===
==== Candidates ====
===== Nominee =====
- Darren Soto, incumbent U.S. representative

===== Withdrawn =====
- Hendrith Vanlon Smith Jr., financial advisor

==== Endorsements ====
Darren Soto
- Planned Parenthood Action Fund

=== Republican primary ===
==== Candidates ====
===== Nominee =====
- Bill Olson, former U.S. Army sergeant

===== Eliminated in primary =====
- Jose Castillo, hospitality manager
- Sergio E. Ortiz, mortgage banker
- Christopher Wright, attorney

==== Primary results ====
Republican primary results
Party	Candidate	Votes	%
Republican	Bill Olson	20,751	48.6
Republican	Christopher Wright	9,677	22.7
Republican	Jose Castillo	8,595	20.1
Republican	Sergio E. Ortiz	3,680	8.6
Total votes		42,703	100.0

=== Independent and third-party candidates ===
==== Independents ====
===== Declared =====
- Clay Hill (write-in), perennial candidate

===== Withdrawn =====
- John Rallison, teacher and pastor

=== General election ===
==== Debate ====
2020 Florida's 9th congressional district debate
No.	Date	Host	Moderator	Link	Democratic	Republican
Key: P Participant A Absent N Not invited I Invited W Withdrawn						
Key: P Participant A Absent N Not invited I Invited W Withdrawn					Darren Soto	Bill Olson
1	Oct. 6, 2020	WESH	Greg Fox		P	P

==== Predictions ====
Source	Ranking	As of
The Cook Political Report	Safe D	July 2, 2020
FiveThirtyEight	Safe D	October 15, 2020
Inside Elections	Safe D	June 2, 2020
Sabato's Crystal Ball	Safe D	July 2, 2020
Politico	Likely D	April 19, 2020
Daily Kos	Safe D	June 3, 2020
RCP	Safe D	June 9, 2020
Niskanen	Safe D	June 7, 2020

==== Results ====
Florida's 9th congressional district, 2020
Party	Candidate	Votes	%
Democratic	Darren Soto (incumbent)	240,724	56.02%
Republican	Bill Olson	188,889	43.96%
Independent	Clay Hill (write-in)	25	0.01%
Total votes		429,638	100.0
Democratic hold			

===== County results =====
	Darren Soto Democratic		Bill Olson Republican		Clay Hill Independent		Margin		Total
County	Votes	%	Votes	%	Votes	%	Votes	%	Votes
Orange	62,032	61.78%	38,365	38.21%	6	0.01%	23,667	23.57%	100,403
Osceola	103,147	61.06%	65,756	38.93%	15	0.01%	37,391	22.14%	168,918
Polk	75,545	47.12%	84,768	52.88%	4	0.01%	-9,223	-5.75	160,317

== District 10 ==
2020 Florida's 10th congressional district election
- November 3, 2020
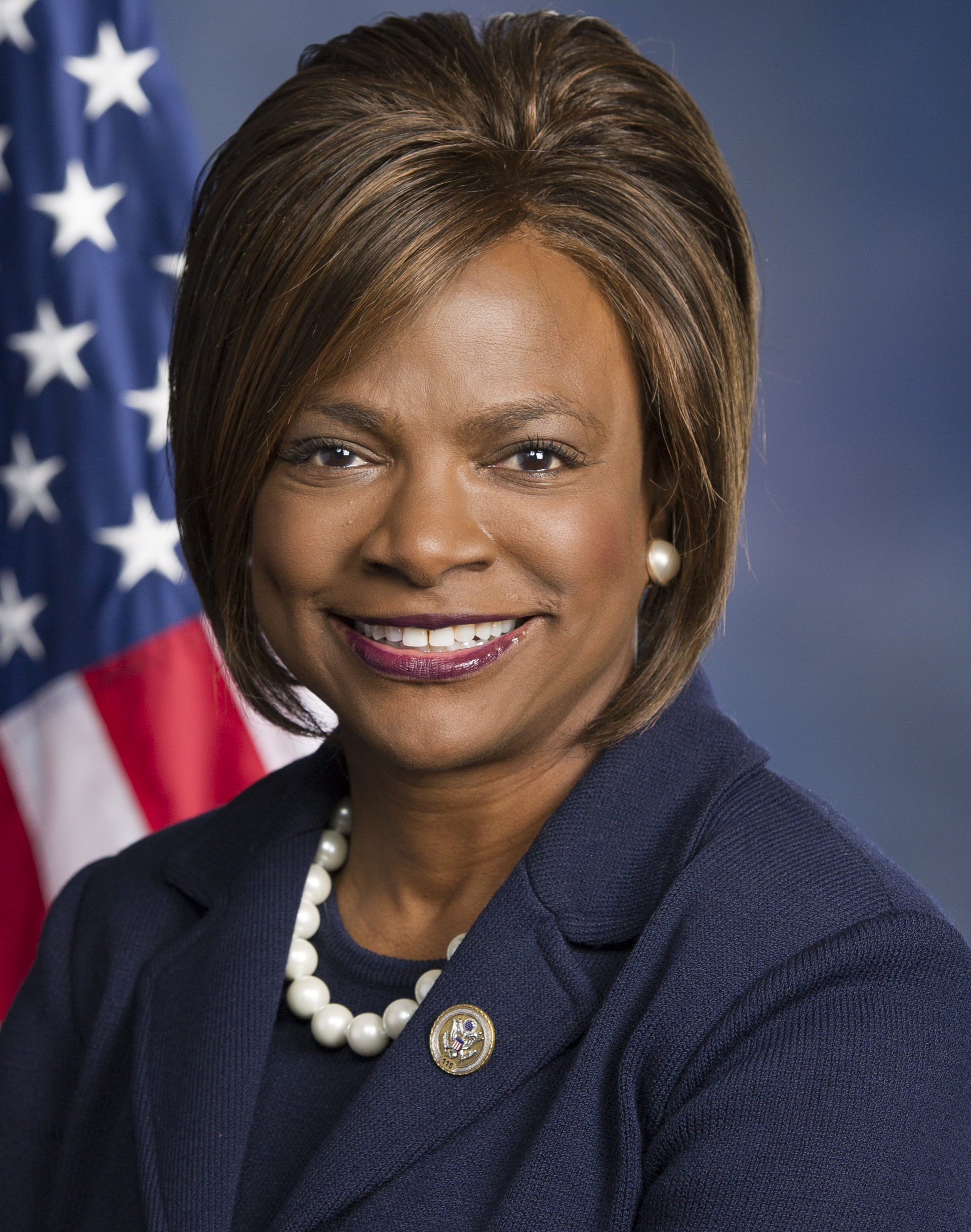

Nominee	Val Demings	Vennia Francois
Party	Democratic	Republican
Popular vote	239,434	136,889
Percentage	63.61%	36.36%
- Precinct results Demings: 50–60% 60–70% 70–80% 80–90% >90% Francois: 50–60% 60–70% No data
U.S. Representative before election
Val Demings
Democratic
Elected U.S. Representative
Val Demings
Democratic

The 10th district is located in Central Florida, and includes part of Orange County. The district includes western Orlando and its surrounding suburbs, including Apopka, Ocoee, and Winter Garden. Democrat Val Demings, who had represented the district since 2017, was re-elected unopposed in 2018.

=== Democratic primary ===
==== Candidates ====
===== Nominee =====
- Val Demings, incumbent U.S. representative

=== Republican primary ===
==== Candidates ====
===== Nominee =====
- Vennia Francois, former U.S. Senate aide and candidate for Florida's 7th congressional district in 2018

===== Eliminated in primary =====
- Willie Montague, pastor

==== Primary results ====
Republican primary results
Party	Candidate	Votes	%
Republican	Vennia Francois	21,485	65.1
Republican	Willie Montague	11,498	34.9
Total votes		32,983	100.0

=== Independent and third-party candidates ===
==== Independents ====
===== Candidates =====
- Sufiyah Yasmine (write-in), artist

===== Withdrawn =====
- Kristofer Lawson, writer

=== General election ===
==== Predictions ====
Source	Ranking	As of
The Cook Political Report	Safe D	July 2, 2020
FiveThirtyEight	Safe D	October 15, 2020
Inside Elections	Safe D	June 2, 2020
Sabato's Crystal Ball	Safe D	July 2, 2020
Politico	Safe D	April 19, 2020
Daily Kos	Safe D	June 3, 2020
RCP	Safe D	June 9, 2020
Niskanen	Safe D	June 7, 2020

==== Results ====
Florida’s 10th congressional district, 2020
Party	Candidate	Votes	%
Democratic	Val Demings (incumbent)	239,434	63.61%
Republican	Vennia Francois	136,889	36.36%
Independent	Sufiyah Yasmine (write-in)	74	0.01%
Total votes		376,397	100.0
Democratic hold			

===== County results =====
	Val Demings Democratic		Vennia Francois Republican		Sufiyah Yasmine Independent		Margin		Total
County	Votes	%	Votes	%	Votes	%	Votes	%	Votes
Orange	239,434	63.61%	136,889	36.37%	74	0.02%	102,545	27.24%	376,397

== District 11 ==
2020 Florida's 11th congressional district election
- November 3, 2020
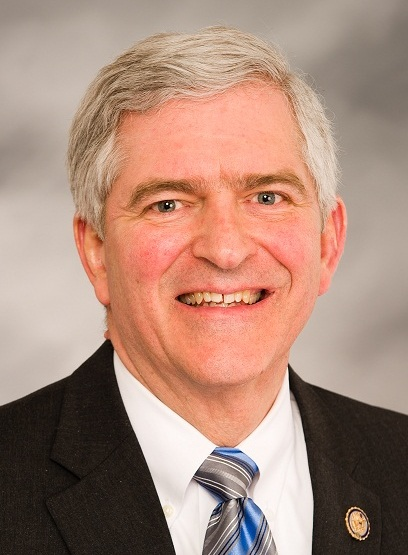

Nominee	Daniel Webster	Dana Cottrell
Party	Republican	Democratic
Popular vote	316,979	158,094
Percentage	66.72%	33.27%
- Precinct results Webster: 50–60% 60–70% 70–80% 80–90% Cottrell: 50–60% 60–70% 70–80% No data
U.S. Representative before election
Daniel Webster
Republican
Elected U.S. Representative
Daniel Webster
Republican

The 11th district is located in North Central Florida, and includes all of Sumter, Citrus, and Hernando counties, as well as parts of Marion and Lake counties. The district includes the cities of Spring Hill, Inverness, and Leesburg, as well as the large retirement community of The Villages. Republican Daniel Webster, who had represented the district since 2011, was re-elected with 65% of the vote in 2018.

=== Republican primary ===
==== Candidates ====
===== Nominee =====
- Daniel Webster, incumbent U.S. representative

=== Democratic primary ===
==== Candidates ====
===== Nominee =====
- Dana Cottrell, teacher and nominee for Florida's 11th congressional district in 2018

===== Withdrawn =====
- James Henry, former official in Greenfield, Massachusetts, and Hollis, Maine
- Jeff Rabinowitz, author

=== General election ===
==== Predictions ====
Source	Ranking	As of
The Cook Political Report	Safe R	July 2, 2020
FiveThirtyEight	Safe R	October 15, 2020
Inside Elections	Safe R	June 2, 2020
Sabato's Crystal Ball	Safe R	July 2, 2020
Politico	Safe R	April 19, 2020
Daily Kos	Safe R	June 3, 2020
RCP	Safe R	June 9, 2020
Niskanen	Safe R	June 7, 2020

==== Results ====
Florida's 11th congressional district, 2020
Party	Candidate	Votes	%
Republican	Daniel Webster (incumbent)	316,979	66.72%
Democratic	Dana Cottrell	158,094	33.27%
Total votes		475,073	100.0
Republican hold			

===== County results =====
	Daniel Webster Republican		Dana Cottrell Democratic		Margin		Total
County	Votes	%	Votes	%	Votes	%	Votes
Citrus	64,293	70.57%	26,816	29.43%	37,477	41.13%	91,109
Hernando	68,885	64.73%	37,530	35.27%	31,355	29.46%	106,415
Lake	61,012	64.93%	32,956	35.07%	28,056	29.86%	93,968
Marion	58,948	63.42%	33,999	36.58%	24,949	26.84%	92,947
Sumter	63,841	70.44%	26,793	29.56%	37,048	40.88%	90,634

== District 12 ==
2020 Florida's 12th congressional district election
- November 3, 2020
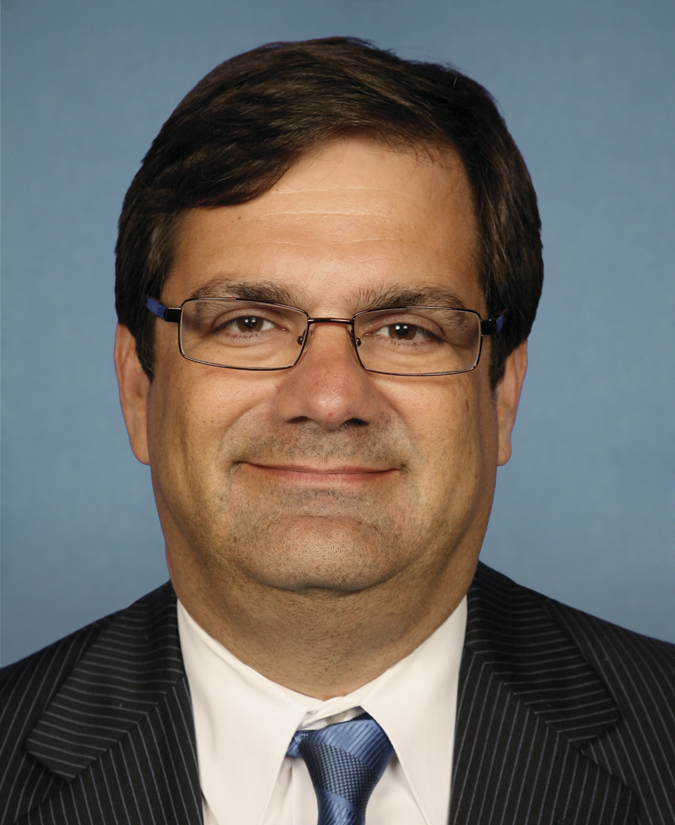

Nominee	Gus Bilirakis	Kimberly Walker
Party	Republican	Democratic
Popular vote	284,941	168,194
Percentage	62.88%	37.11%
- Precinct results Bilirakis: 50–60% 60–70% 70–80% 80–90% Walker: 50–60% No data
U.S. Representative before election
Gus Bilirakis
Republican
Elected U.S. Representative
Gus Bilirakis
Republican

The 12th district encompasses the northern Tampa Bay area, including all of Pasco County, as well as parts of Hillsborough and Pinellas counties. The district includes the cities of Palm Harbor, New Port Richey, and Zephyrhills. Republican Gus Bilirakis, who had represented the district since 2007, was re-elected with 58% of the vote in 2018.

=== Republican primary ===
==== Candidates ====
===== Nominee =====
- Gus Bilirakis, incumbent U.S. representative

=== Democratic primary ===
==== Candidates ====
===== Nominee =====
- Kimberly Walker, businesswoman and U.S. Air Force veteran

==== Endorsements ====
Kimberly Walker

Organizations

- LPAC

=== Independent and third-party candidates ===
==== Independents ====
===== Withdrawn =====
- Michael Knezevich, private investigator and former U.S. Customs Service pilot

=== General election ===
==== Predictions ====
Source	Ranking	As of
The Cook Political Report	Safe R	July 2, 2020
FiveThirtyEight	Safe R	October 15, 2020
Inside Elections	Safe R	June 2, 2020
Sabato's Crystal Ball	Safe R	July 2, 2020
Politico	Safe R	April 19, 2020
Daily Kos	Safe R	June 3, 2020
RCP	Safe R	June 9, 2020
Niskanen	Safe R	June 7, 2020

==== Results ====
Florida's 12th congressional district, 2020
Party	Candidate	Votes	%
Republican	Gus Bilirakis (incumbent)	284,941	62.88%
Democratic	Kimberly Walker	168,194	37.11%
Total votes		453,135	100.0
Republican hold			

===== County results =====
	Gus Bilirakis Republican		Kimberly Walker Democratic		Margin		Total
County	Votes	%	Votes	%	Votes	%	Votes
Hillsborough	5,558	63.47%	3,199	36.53%	2,159	25.11%	8,757
Pasco	188,887	63.48%	108,659	36.52%	80,228	26.96%	297,546
Pinellas	90,496	61.63%	56,336	38.37%	34,160	23.26%	146,832

== District 13 ==
2020 Florida's 13th congressional district election
- November 3, 2020
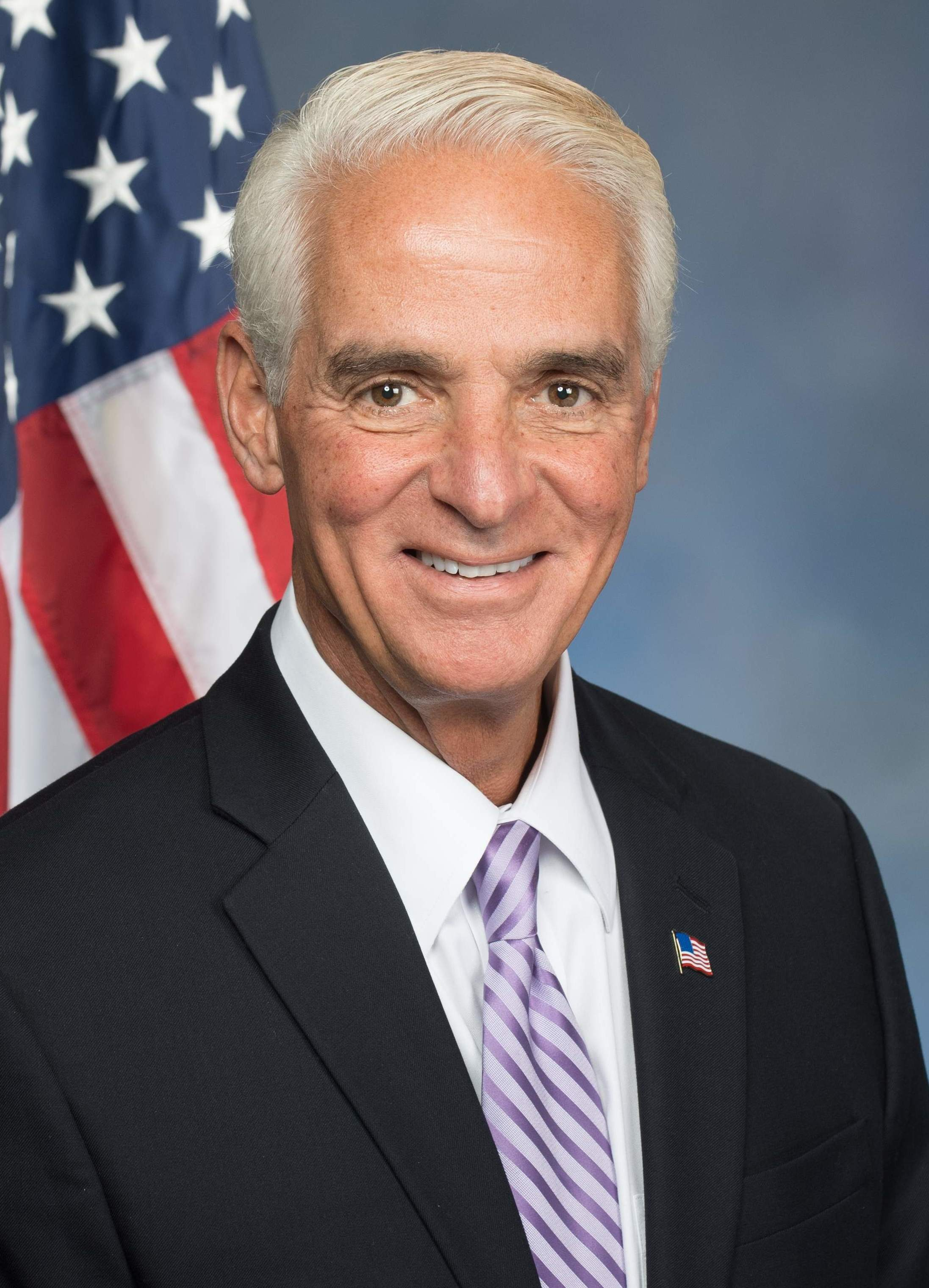

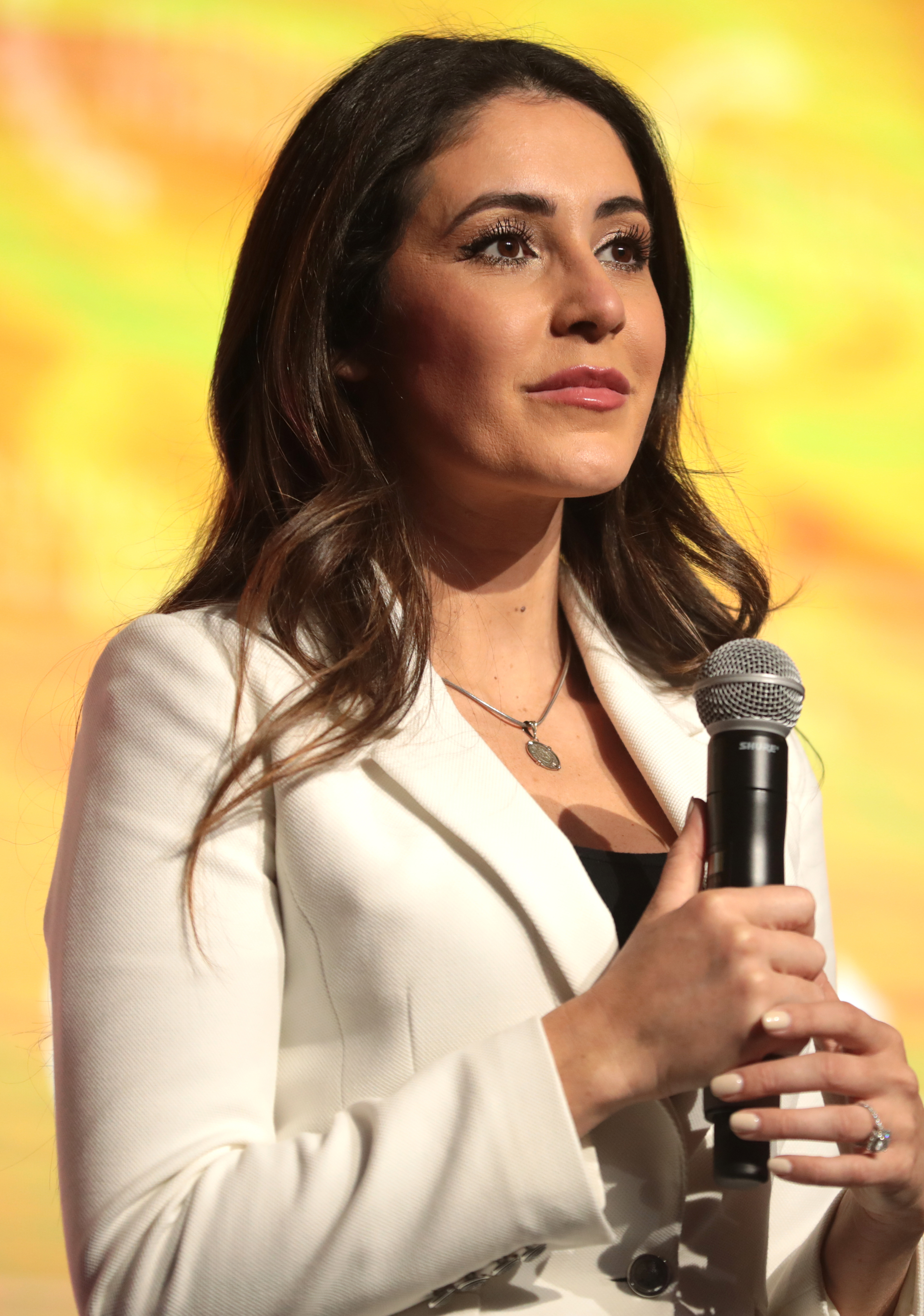
Nominee	Charlie Crist	Anna Paulina Luna
Party	Democratic	Republican
Popular vote	215,405	190,713
Percentage	53.03%	46.95%
- Precinct results Crist: 40–50% 50–60% 60–70% 70–80% 80–90% >90% Luna: 50–60% 60–70% 70–80% 80–90% >90% Tie: 50% No data
U.S. Representative before election
Charlie Crist
Democratic
Elected U.S. Representative
Charlie Crist
Democratic

The 13th district is located in the western Tampa Bay area and encompasses the northern Florida Suncoast, and includes part of Pinellas County. The district includes the cities of St. Petersburg, Clearwater, and Largo. Democrat Charlie Crist, who had represented the district since 2017, was re-elected with 57.6% of the vote in 2018.

This district was included on the list of Democratic-held seats the National Republican Congressional Committee targeted in 2020.

=== Democratic primary ===
==== Candidates ====
===== Nominee =====
- Charlie Crist, incumbent U.S. representative

==== Endorsements ====
Charlie Crist

Organizations

- League of Conservation Voters
- NARAL Pro-Choice America
- Planned Parenthood Action Fund
- Sierra Club

=== Republican primary ===
==== Candidates ====
===== Nominee =====
- Anna Paulina Luna, director of Hispanic Engagement for Turning Point USA and U.S. Air Force veteran

===== Eliminated in primary =====
- George Buck, U.S. Army veteran and nominee for Florida's 13th congressional district in 2018
- Sheila Griffin, attorney and candidate for St. Petersburg city council in 2015
- Amanda Makki, lobbyist and former congressional aide

===== Withdrawn =====
- Rick Baker, former mayor of St. Petersburg
- Matt Becker, businessman and 2012 Republican National Convention executive
- Sharon Newby, businesswoman (endorsed Luna)

==== Endorsements ====
Anna Paulina Luna

Federal officials

- Matt Gaetz, U.S. representative (FL-01)
- Elise Stefanik, U.S. representative (NY-21)
- Donald Trump, president of the United States

Local officials

- Bill Foster, former mayor of St. Petersburg (2010–2014)

Organizations

- Students for Trump
Amanda Makki

Federal officials

- Michael Burgess, U.S. representative (TX-26)
- Neal Dunn, U.S. representative (FL-02)
- Joni Ernst, U.S. senator from Iowa
- Kevin McCarthy, U.S. representative (CA-23), House minority leader, and former House majority leader (2014–2019) and House Majority Whip (2011–2014)
- John Rutherford, U.S. representative (FL-04)
- Steve Scalise, U.S. representative (LA-01), House Minority Whip, and former House Majority Whip (2014–2019)
- Michael Waltz, U.S. representative (FL-06)

State officials

- J. W. Grant, state representative

Organizations

- Fraternal Order of Police Lodges 10 and 43
- FreedomWorks
- Maggie's List
- Maverick PAC
- National Emergency Medicine (NEM) PAC
- National Republican Congressional Committee
- Republican Main Street Partnership PAC
- Value in Electing Women (VIEW) PAC

Individuals

- Robert J. O'Neill, former U.S. Navy SEAL

==== Polling ====
Poll source	Date(s) administered	Sample size	Margin of error	George Buck	Sheila Griffin	Anna Paulina Luna	Amanda Makki	Other	Undecided
St. Pete Polls	August 15, 2020	626 (LV)	± 3.9%	26%	6%	29%	20%	1% (Note: Sharon Newby with 1%)	–
St. Pete Polls	July 9, 2020	558 (LV)	± 4.1%	21%	4%	13%	29%	1% (Note: Newby with 1%)	32%

==== Primary results ====
Republican primary results
Party	Candidate	Votes	%
Republican	Anna Paulina Luna	22,941	36.1
Republican	Amanda Makki	17,967	28.3
Republican	George Buck	16,371	25.8
Republican	Sheila Griffin	4,329	6.8
Republican	Sharon Newby (withdrawn)	1,866	2.9
Total votes		63,474	100.0

=== Independent and third-party candidates ===
==== Independent Republicans ====
===== Declared =====
- Jacob Curnow (write-in), author

=== General election ===
==== Predictions ====
Source	Ranking	As of
The Cook Political Report	Safe D	July 2, 2020
FiveThirtyEight	Safe D	October 15, 2020
Inside Elections	Safe D	June 2, 2020
Sabato's Crystal Ball	Safe D	October 1, 2020
Politico	Lean D	April 19, 2020
Daily Kos	Safe D	November 2, 2020
RCP	Likely D	June 9, 2020
Niskanen	Safe D	June 7, 2020

==== Polling ====
Poll source	Date(s) administered	Sample size	Margin of error	Charlie Crist (D)	Anna Paulina Luna (R)	Undecided
St. Pete Polls	October 28, 2020	1,280 (LV)	± 2.7%	55%	39%	7%
St. Pete Polls	August 29–30, 2020	2,160 (LV)	± 2.1%	55%	39%	7%

Hypothetical polling

Poll source	Date(s) administered	Sample size	Margin of error	Charlie Crist (D)	Rick Baker (R)	Undecided
St. Pete Polls/FloridaPolitics	Sep 25, 2019	1,254 (RV)	± 2.8%	42%	35%	23%

==== Results ====
Florida's 13th congressional district, 2020
Party	Candidate	Votes	%
Democratic	Charlie Crist (incumbent)	215,405	53.03%
Republican	Anna Paulina Luna	190,713	46.96%
Republican	Jacob Curnow (write-in)	7	0.00%
Total votes		406,125	100.0
Democratic hold			

===== County results =====
	Charlie Crist Democratic		Anna Paulina Luna Republican		Jacob Cunrow Republican		Margin		Total
County	Votes	%	Votes	%	Votes	%	Votes	%	Votes
Pinellas	215,405	53.04%	190,713	46.96%	7	0.00%	24,692	6.08%	406,125

== District 14 ==
2020 Florida's 14th congressional district election
- November 3, 2020
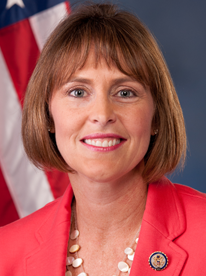

Nominee	Kathy Castor	Christine Quinn
Party	Democratic	Republican
Popular vote	224,240	147,896
Percentage	60.25%	39.74%
- Precinct results Castor: 50–60% 60–70% 70–80% 80–90% >90% Quinn: 50–60% 60–70% Tie: 50% No data
U.S. Representative before election
Kathy Castor
Democratic
Elected U.S. Representative
Kathy Castor
Democratic

The 14th district is located in the northern Tampa Bay area, and includes part of Hillsborough County. The district includes the cities of Tampa, Carrollwood, and Northdale. Democrat Kathy Castor, who had represented the district since 2007, was re-elected unopposed in 2018.

=== Democratic primary ===
==== Candidates ====
===== Nominee =====
- Kathy Castor, incumbent U.S. representative

===== Withdrawn =====
- Alix Toulme Jr., Christian activist and U.S. Navy veteran

=== Republican primary ===
==== Candidates ====
===== Nominee =====
- Christine Quinn, businesswoman and nominee for Florida's 14th congressional district in 2016

===== Eliminated in primary =====
- Paul Elliott, former Hillsborough County judge

==== Primary results ====
Republican primary results
Party	Candidate	Votes	%
Republican	Christine Quinn	24,077	64.5
Republican	Paul Elliott	13,257	35.5
Total votes		37,334	100.0

=== Independent and third-party candidates ===
==== Independents ====
===== Withdrawn =====
- Robert Wunderlich, attorney and former Green Beret

=== General election ===
==== Predictions ====
Source	Ranking	As of
The Cook Political Report	Safe D	July 2, 2020
FiveThirtyEight	Safe D	October 15, 2020
Inside Elections	Safe D	June 2, 2020
Sabato's Crystal Ball	Safe D	July 2, 2020
Politico	Safe D	April 19, 2020
Daily Kos	Safe D	June 3, 2020
RCP	Safe D	June 9, 2020
Niskanen	Safe D	June 7, 2020

==== Results ====
Florida’s 14th congressional district, 2020
Party	Candidate	Votes	%
Democratic	Kathy Castor (incumbent)	224,240	60.25%
Republican	Christine Quinn	147,896	39.74%
Total votes		372,136	100.0
Democratic hold			

===== County results =====
	Kathy Castor Democratic		Christine Quinn Republican		Margin		Total
County	Votes	%	Votes	%	Votes	%	Votes
Hillsborough	224,240	60.26%	147,896	39.74%	76,344	20.52%	372,136

== District 15 ==
2020 Florida's 15th congressional district election
- November 3, 2020
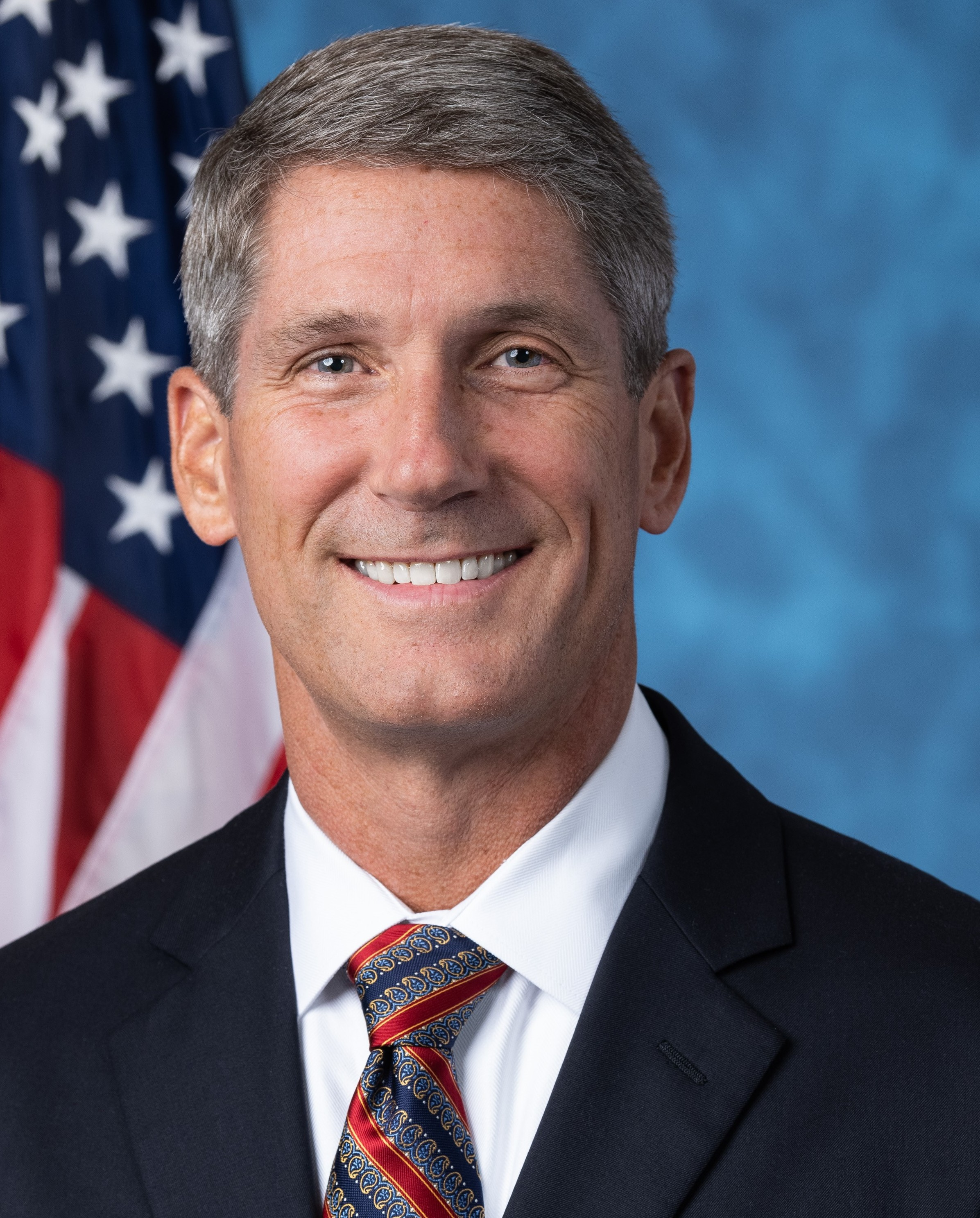

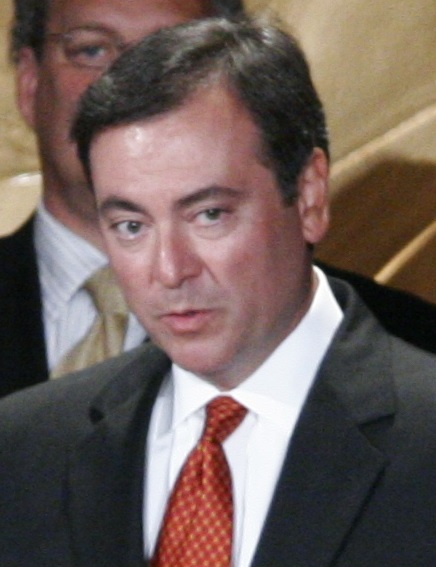
Nominee	Scott Franklin	Alan Cohn
Party	Republican	Democratic
Popular vote	216,374	174,297
Percentage	55.38%	44.61%
- Precinct results Franklin: 50–60% 60–70% 70–80% 80–90% Cohn: 50–60% 60–70% 70–80% 80–90% No data
U.S. Representative before election
Ross Spano
Republican
Elected U.S. Representative
Scott Franklin
Republican

The 15th district is located in the northeastern Tampa Bay area and extends along the I-4 corridor into Central Florida, and includes parts of Hillsborough, Polk, and Lake counties. The district includes the cities of Lakeland, Brandon, and Bartow. Republican Ross Spano, who had represented the district since 2019, was elected with 53% of the vote in 2018. Spano lost renomination in the Republican primary.

This district was included on the list of Republican-held seats the Democratic Congressional Campaign Committee targeted in 2020.

=== Republican primary ===
==== Candidates ====
===== Nominee =====
- Scott Franklin, Lakeland city commissioner

===== Eliminated in primary =====
- Ross Spano, incumbent U.S. representative

===== Declined =====
- Neil Combee, former state representative and candidate for Florida's 15th congressional district in 2018
- Sean Harper, contractor and candidate for Florida's 15th congressional district in 2018
- Danny Kushmer, non-profit executive and candidate for Florida's 15th congressional district in 2018 (running for Florida House of Representatives, District 59)
- Ed Shoemaker, conservative activist and candidate for Florida's 15th congressional district in 2018 (running for Polk County School Board)

==== Endorsements ====
Scott Franklin

Federal officials

- Matt Gaetz, U.S. representative from FL-01

Local officials

- Grady Judd, sheriff of Polk County, Florida (2005–present) (Independent)
Ross Spano

U.S. senators

- Marco Rubio, U.S. senator from Florida (2011–2025); chair of the Senate Small Business Committee (2019–2021); candidate for President in 2016

U.S. representatives

- Gus Bilirakis, U.S. representative from FL-12 (2013–present) and FL-09 (2007–2013)
- Vern Buchanan, U.S. representative from FL-16 (2013–present) and FL-13 (2007–2013)
- Liz Cheney, U.S. representative from WY-00 (2017–2023); chair of the House Republican Conference (2019–2021); candidate for U.S. Senate from Wyoming in 2014
- Mario Díaz-Balart, U.S. representative from FL-25 (2003–2011 and 2013–present) and FL-21 (2011–2013)
- Tom Emmer, U.S. representative from MN-06 (2015–present); chair of the National Republican Congressional Committee (2019–2023)
- Kevin McCarthy, U.S. representative from CA-23 (2013–2023) and CA-22 (2007–2013); House minority leader (2019–2023); leader of the House Republican Conference (2019–2023)
- Steve Scalise, U.S. representative from LA-01 (2008–present); House minority whip (2019–2023)
- Greg Steube, U.S. representative from FL-17 (2019–present)
- Michael Waltz, U.S. representative from FL-06 (2019–2025)
- Daniel Webster, U.S. representative from FL-11 (2017–present), FL-10 (2013–2017), and FL-08 (2011–2013); candidate for U.S. Senate from Florida in 2004

State legislators

- Kelli Stargel, Florida state senator from District 22 (2016–present) and District 15 (2012–2016)

Local officials

- Carey Baker, property appraiser of Lake County, Florida (2012–present)

Organizations

- Club for Growth
- National Right to Life Committee
- NRA Political Victory Fund

==== Polling ====
Poll source	Date(s) administered	Sample size	Margin of Error	Scott Franklin	Ross Spano	Other
St. Pete Polls	August 12, 2020	594 (LV)	± 4%	41%	42%	18% (Note: "Undecided/won't say" with 18%)

==== Primary results ====
Republican primary results
Party	Candidate	Votes	%
Republican	Scott Franklin	30,736	51.2
Republican	Ross Spano (incumbent)	29,265	48.8
Total votes		60,001	100.0

=== Democratic primary ===
==== Candidates ====
===== Nominee =====
- Alan Cohn, Peabody and Emmy award-winning journalist and nominee for Florida's 15th congressional district in 2014

===== Eliminated in primary =====
- Adam Hattersley, state representative
- Jesse Philippe, U.S. Marine Corps veteran

===== Withdrawn =====
- Kel Britvec, former Defense Intelligence Agency officer
- Andrew Learned, U.S. Naval Reserve officer and candidate for Florida's 15th congressional district in 2018 (running for Florida House of Representatives, District 59)
- Loretta Miller, radio host and Republican candidate for Florida's 15th congressional district in 2018 (died on April 13, 2020)

===== Declined =====
- Kristen Carlson, attorney and nominee for Florida's 15th congressional district in 2018 (endorsed Adam Hattersley)

==== Endorsements ====
Alan Cohn

U.S. presidents

- Barack Obama, 44th president of the United States (2009–2017), U.S. senator from Illinois (2005–2008)

U.S. senators

- Kent Conrad, U.S. senator from North Dakota (1987–2013)
- Bob Graham, U.S. senator from Florida (1987–2005); governor of Florida (1979–1987); candidate for president in 2004

U.S. representatives

- Charlie Crist, U.S. representative from FL-13, governor of Florida (2007–2011), attorney general of Florida (2003–2007) (former Republican)
- Ted Deutch, U.S. representative from FL-22, U.S. representative from FL-21 (2013–2017), U.S. representative from FL-19 (2010–2013)
- Lois Frankel, U.S. representative from FL-22, U.S. representative from FL-21 (2017–present)
- Gwen Graham, U.S. representative from FL-02 (2015–2017); candidate for governor of Florida in 2018
- Patrick J. Kennedy, U.S. representative from RI-1, son of Ted Kennedy
- Darren Soto, U.S. representative from FL-09 (2017–present)

State executives

- Nikki Fried, Florida commissioner of agriculture (2019–present)

Municipal officials

- Philip Levine, mayor of Miami Beach, Florida (2013–2017); candidate for governor of Florida in 2018

Individuals

- Randy Bryce, political activist
- Cenk Uygur, political commentator, media host, journalist, and attorney; candidate for U.S. representative from CA-25 in 2020

Labor unions

- American Federation of Government Employees
- American Postal Workers Union
- Communication Workers of America
- International Brotherhood of Teamsters
- International Union of Operating Engineers
- SEIU
- United Association
- United Food and Commercial Workers

Organizations

- Jewish Democratic Council of America
- Moms Demand Action
- Sierra Club
- The Young Turks
Adam Hattersley

U.S. representatives

- Kathy Castor, U.S. representative from FL-14 (2013–present) and FL-11 (2007–2013)
- Stephanie Murphy, U.S. representative from FL-07 (2017–present)

State officials

- Betty Castor, education commissioner of Florida (1987–1994); Democratic nominee for U.S. Senate from Florida in 2004

State legislators

- Janet Cruz, Florida state senator from District 18 (2018–present)
- Ben Diamond, Florida state representative from District 68 (2016–present)
- Fentrice Driskell, Florida state representative from District 63 (2018–present)
- Javier Fernandez, Florida state representative from District 114 (2018–present)
- Dianne Hart, Florida state representative from District 61 (2018–present)
- Evan Jenne, Florida state representative from District 99 (2014–present); Florida state representative from District 100 (2006–2012)
- Kionne McGhee, Florida state representative from District 117 (2012–present); minority leader of the Florida House of Representatives (2018–present)
- Wengay Newton, Florida state representative from District 70 (2016–present)
- Sean Shaw, Florida state representative from District 61 (2016–2018); Democratic nominee for Florida attorney general in 2018
- Carlos Guillermo Smith, Florida state representative from District 49 (2016–present)
- Susan Valdes, Florida state representative from District 62 (2018–present)
- Jennifer Webb, Florida state representative from District 69 (2018–present)

Municipal officials

- Sandra Freedman, mayor of Tampa, Florida (1986–1995)
- Rick Kriseman, mayor of St. Petersburg, Florida (2014–present)

Individuals

- Kristen Carlson, attorney, Democratic nominee for U.S. representative from FL-15 in 2018
- John Hutson, United States Navy officer, attorney, and judge advocate general of the Navy
- Nancy Soderberg, foreign policy strategist; Democratic nominee for U.S. representative from FL-06 in 2018

Labor unions

- International Association of Fire Fighters – Local 2294
- International Brotherhood of Electrical Workers – Local 824

Organizations

- 314 Action
- Blue Dog Coalition
- College Democrats of America – Florida chapter
- Florida Democratic Party – Disabilities Issues Caucus
- Florida Democratic Party – LGBT+ Caucus
Declined to endorse

Labor unions

- AFL–CIO – West Central Florida Labor Council

==== Primary results ====
Democratic primary results
Party	Candidate	Votes	%
Democratic	Alan Cohn	21,079	41.0
Democratic	Adam Hattersley	16,978	33.0
Democratic	Jesse Philippe	13,384	26.0
Total votes		51,441	100.0

=== General election ===
==== Predictions ====
Source	Ranking	As of
The Cook Political Report	Lean R	July 16, 2020
FiveThirtyEight	Likely R	October 15, 2020
Inside Elections	Lean R	August 7, 2020
Sabato's Crystal Ball	Lean R	July 2, 2020
Politico	Lean R	July 6, 2020
Daily Kos	Likely R	April 30, 2020
RCP	Tossup	October 15, 2020
Niskanen	Lean R	June 7, 2020

==== Polling ====
Poll source	Date(s) administered	Sample size	Margin of Error	Scott Franklin (R)	Alan Cohn (D)	Undecided
Change Research (D) (Note: Poll sponsored by the Florida Democratic Party, which endorsed Cohn prior to the sampling period.)	October 22–24, 2020	530 (LV)	± 4.3%	46%	44%	–
St. Pete Polls	October 15, 2020	943 (LV)	± 3.2%	49%	41%	11%
DCCC Targeting & Analytics Department (D) (Note: Poll conducted by the DCCC.)	September 30 – October 4, 2020	390 (LV)	± 5%	42%	39%	19%
GQR Research (D) (Note: Poll sponsored by Cohn's campaign.)	September 4–6, 2020	400 (LV)	± 4.9%	49%	42%	–

Hypothetical polling

Poll source	Date(s) administered	Sample size	Margin of Error	Generic Republican	Generic Democrat
DCCC Targeting & Analytics Department (D)	September 30 – October 4, 2020	390 (LV)	± 5%	49%	44%

==== Results ====
Florida's 15th congressional district, 2020
Party	Candidate	Votes	%
Republican	Scott Franklin	216,374	55.38%
Democratic	Alan Cohn	174,297	44.61%
Total votes		390,671	100.0
Republican hold			

===== County results =====
	Scott Franklin Republican		Alan Cohn Democratic		Margin		Total
County	Votes	%	Votes	%	Votes	%	Votes
Hillsborough	99,886	52.67%	89,768	47.33%	10,118	5.33%	189,654
Lake	34,194	53.55%	29,661	46.45%	4,533	7.10%	63,855
Polk	82,294	59.98%	54,918	40.02%	27,376	19.95%	137,212

== District 16 ==
2020 Florida's 16th congressional district election
- November 3, 2020
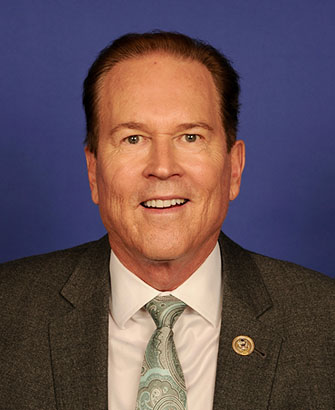

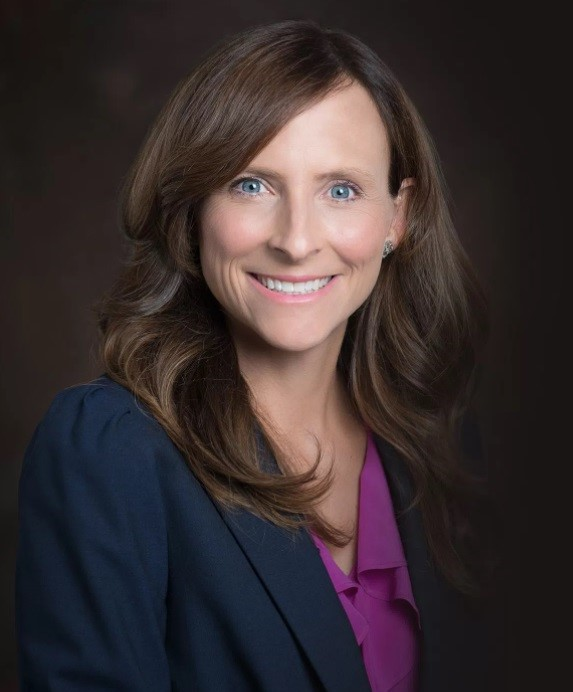
Nominee	Vern Buchanan	Margaret Good
Party	Republican	Democratic
Popular vote	269,001	215,683
Percentage	55.50%	44.49%
- Precinct results Buchanan: 50–60% 60–70% 70–80% 80–90% Good: 50–60% 60–70% 70–80% >90% No data
U.S. Representative before election
Vern Buchanan
Republican
Elected U.S. Representative
Vern Buchanan
Republican

The 16th district encompasses the southern Tampa Bay area and southern Florida Suncoast, and includes all of Manatee County, as well as parts of Hillsborough and Sarasota counties. The district includes the cities of Sarasota, Bradenton, and Sun City Center. Republican Vern Buchanan, who had represented the district since 2007, was reelected with 54% of the vote in 2018.

This district was included on the list of Republican-held seats the Democratic Congressional Campaign Committee targeted in 2020.

=== Republican primary ===
==== Candidates ====
===== Nominee =====
- Vern Buchanan, incumbent U.S. representative

=== Democratic primary ===
==== Candidates ====
===== Nominee =====
- Margaret Good, state representative

==== Endorsements ====
Margaret Good

U.S. presidents

- Barack Obama, 44th president of the United States (2009–2017), U.S. senator from Illinois (2005–2008)

Organizations

- Emily's List
- High School Democrats of America
- League of Conservation Voters
- NARAL Pro-Choice America
- Planned Parenthood
- Sierra Club

=== General election ===
==== Predictions ====
Source	Ranking	As of
The Cook Political Report	Likely R	July 2, 2020
FiveThirtyEight	Likely R	October 15, 2020
Inside Elections	Likely R	August 7, 2020
Sabato's Crystal Ball	Likely R	July 2, 2020
Politico	Likely R	April 19, 2020
Daily Kos	Likely R	June 3, 2020
RCP	Lean R	October 15, 2020
Niskanen	Likely R	June 7, 2020

==== Polling ====
Poll source	Date(s) administered	Sample size	Margin of error	Vern Buchanan (R)	Margaret Good (D)	Other	Undecided
Data Targeting (R) (Note: Poll conducted for Buchanan's campaign.)	October 19–21, 2020	400 (LV)	± 4.9%	53%	38%	–	–
Data Targeting (R)	October 6–8, 2020	403 (LV)	± 4.9%	52%	37%	1% (Note: "Refused" with 1%)	9%
Change Research (D) (Note: Poll conducted for Good's campaign.)	October 5–8, 2020	527 (LV)	± 4.3%	48%	45%	–	7%
Data Targeting (R)	September 29 – October 1, 2020	400 (LV)	–	53%	37%	–	–
Global Strategy Group (D)	September 24–27, 2020	500 (LV)	± 4.4%	49%	43%	–	–
Data Targeting (R)	August 27–29, 2020	400 (LV)	± 4.9%	51%	35%	–	–
Global Strategy Group (D)	July 7–12, 2020	500 (LV)	± 4.4%	47%	41%	–	–
Data Targeting (R)	January 14–16, 2020	400 (RV)	± 4.9%	53%	33%	–	14%

Hypothetical polling

with Generic Republican and Generic Democrat

Poll source	Date(s) administered	Sample size	Margin of error	Generic Republican	Generic Democrat
Global Strategy Group (D)	September 24–27, 2020	500 (LV)	± 4.4%	50%	42%
Data Targeting (R)	August 27–29, 2020	400 (LV)	± 4.9%	48%	39%

==== Results ====
Florida's 16th congressional district, 2020
Party	Candidate	Votes	%
Republican	Vern Buchanan (incumbent)	269,001	55.50%
Democratic	Margaret Good	215,683	44.50%
Total votes		484,684	100.0
Republican hold			

===== County results =====
	Vern Buchanan Republican		Margaret Good Democratic		Margin		Total
County	Votes	%	Votes	%	Votes	%	Votes
Hillsborough	66,515	51.95%	61,511	48.05%	5,004	3.91%	128,026
Manatee	128,072	59.63%	86,698	40.37%	41,374	19.26%	214,770
Sarasota	74,414	52.45%	67,474	47.55%	6,940	4.89%	141,888

== District 17 ==
2020 Florida's 17th congressional district election
- November 3, 2020
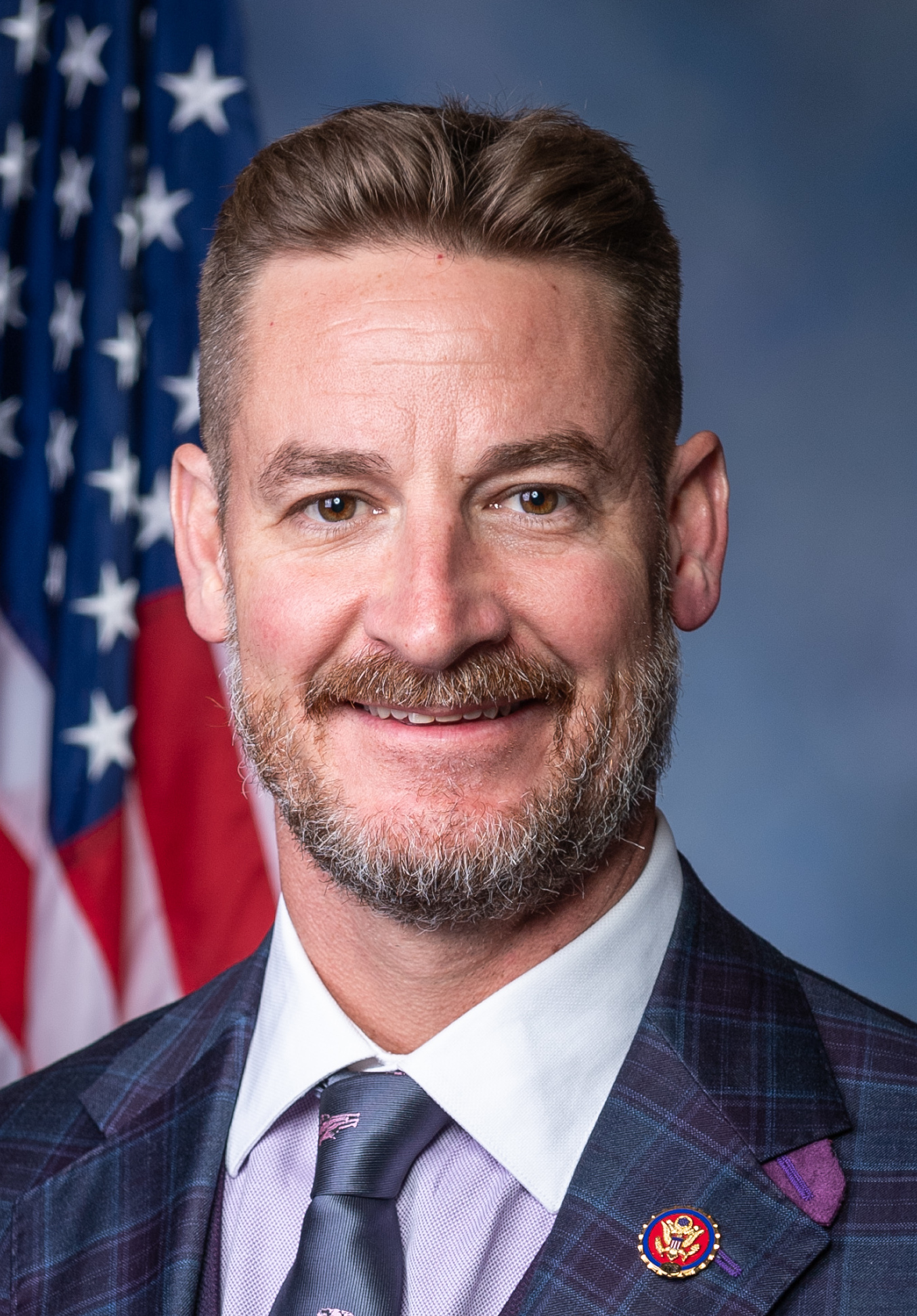

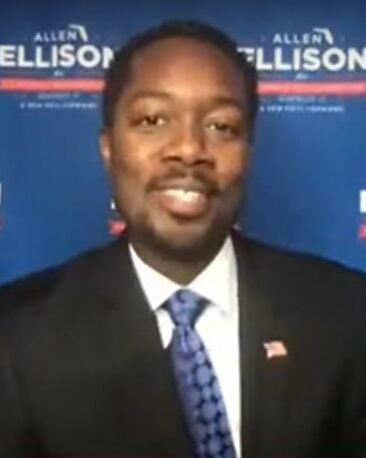
Nominee	Greg Steube	Allen Ellison
Party	Republican	Democratic
Popular vote	266,514	140,487
Percentage	64.62%	34.06%
- Precinct results Steube: 40–50% 50–60% 60–70% 70–80% 80–90% Ellison: 50–60% 60–70% 70–80% >90% No data
U.S. Representative before election
Greg Steube
Republican
Elected U.S. Representative
Greg Steube
Republican

The 17th district encompasses part of Southwest Florida and most of the Florida Heartland, and includes all or part of 10 counties. The district includes the cities of North Port, Port Charlotte, and Sebring. Republican Greg Steube, who had represented the district since 2019, was elected with 62% of the vote in 2018.

=== Republican primary ===
==== Candidates ====
===== Nominee =====
- Greg Steube, incumbent U.S. representative

=== Democratic primary ===
==== Candidates ====
===== Nominee =====
- Allen Ellison, nominee for Florida's 17th congressional district in 2018

=== Independent and third-party candidates ===
==== Independents ====
===== Declared =====
- Theodore Murray, former high school football coach

=== General election ===
==== Predictions ====
Source	Ranking	As of
The Cook Political Report	Safe R	July 2, 2020
FiveThirtyEight	Safe R	October 15, 2020
Inside Elections	Safe R	June 2, 2020
Sabato's Crystal Ball	Safe R	July 2, 2020
Politico	Safe R	April 19, 2020
Daily Kos	Safe R	June 3, 2020
RCP	Safe R	June 9, 2020
Niskanen	Safe R	June 7, 2020

==== Results ====
Florida's 17th congressional district, 2020
Party	Candidate	Votes	%
Republican	Greg Steube (incumbent)	266,514	64.62%
Democratic	Allen Ellison	140,487	34.06%
Independent	Theodore Murray	5,396	1.30%
Total votes		412,397	100.0
Republican hold			

===== County results =====
	Greg Steube Republican		Allen Ellison Democratic		Theodore Murray Independent		Margin		Total
County	Votes	%	Votes	%	Votes	%	Votes	%	Votes
Charlotte	73,809	64.76%	38,633	33.90%	1,531	1.34%	35,176	30.86%	113,973
DeSoto	8,171	66.12%	4,050	32.77%	136	1.10%	4,121	33.35%	12,357
Glades	3,685	72.58%	1,319	25.98%	73	1.44%	2,366	46.60%	5,077
Hardee	5,771	69.30%	2,422	29.09%	134	1.61%	3,349	40.22%	8,327
Highlands	34,540	67.81%	15,807	31.03%	586	1.15%	18,733	36.78%	50,933
Lee	27,620	64.19%	14,733	34.24%	678	1.58%	12,887	29.95%	43,031
Okeechobee	11,082	71.55%	4,129	26.66%	278	1.79%	6,953	44.89%	15,489
Polk	24,504	62.95%	13,751	35.33%	672	1.73%	10,753	27.62%	38,927
Sarasota	77,332	62.22%	45,643	36.73%	1,308	1.05%	31,689	25.50%	124,283

== District 18 ==
2020 Florida's 18th congressional district election
- November 3, 2020
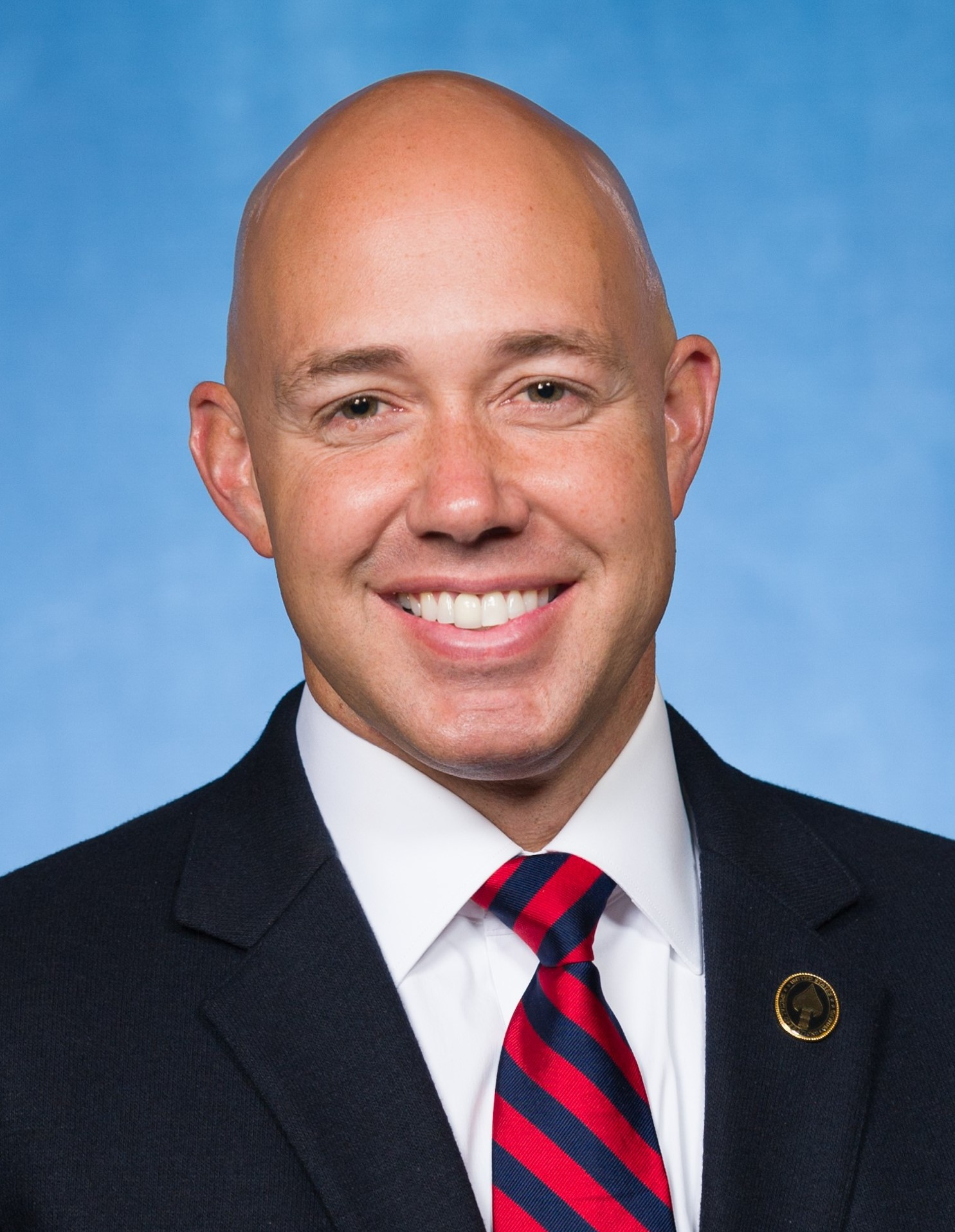

Nominee	Brian Mast	Pam Keith
Party	Republican	Democratic
Popular vote	253,286	186,674
Percentage	56.32%	41.50%
- Precinct results Mast: 40–50% 50–60% 60–70% 70–80% 80–90% >90% Keith: 40–50% 50–60% 60–70% 70–80% 80–90% >90% Tie: 50% No data
U.S. Representative before election
Brian Mast
Republican
Elected U.S. Representative
Brian Mast
Republican

The 18th district encompasses the Treasure Coast region, and includes all of St. Lucie and Martin counties, as well as part of Palm Beach County. The district includes the cities of Port St. Lucie, Fort Pierce, and Jupiter. Republican Brian Mast, who had represented the district since 2017, was re-elected with 54% of the vote in 2018.

This district was included on the list of Republican-held seats the Democratic Congressional Campaign Committee targeted in 2020.

=== Republican primary ===
==== Candidates ====
===== Nominee =====
- Brian Mast, incumbent U.S. representative

===== Eliminated in primary =====
- Nick Vessio, retired police sergeant

==== Primary results ====
Republican primary results
Party	Candidate	Votes	%
Republican	Brian Mast (incumbent)	62,121	86.0
Republican	Nick Vessio	10,081	14.0
Total votes		72,202	100.0

=== Democratic primary ===
==== Candidates ====
===== Nominee =====
- Pam Keith, attorney and candidate for Florida's 18th congressional district in 2018 and U.S. Senate in 2016

===== Eliminated in primary =====
- Oz Vazquez, former Florida deputy solicitor general

==== Endorsements ====
Pam Keith

U.S. senators

- Elizabeth Warren, U.S. senator from Massachusetts

Individuals

- Cori Bush, Democratic nominee for Missouri's 1st congressional district

Organizations

- EMILY's List
- VoteVets
Oz Vazquez

U.S. representatives

- Patrick Murphy, former U.S. representative from this district (2013–2017) and Democratic nominee for U.S. Senate in 2016

State officials

- Nikki Fried, state agriculture commissioner

Organizations

- Congressional Hispanic Caucus Bold PAC
- Florida AFL-CIO
- Latino Victory
- Planned Parenthood Action Fund

==== Primary results ====
Democratic primary results
Party	Candidate	Votes	%
Democratic	Pam Keith	52,921	79.8
Democratic	Oz Vazquez	13,385	20.2
Total votes		66,306	100.0

=== Independent and third-party candidates ===
==== Independents ====
===== Declared =====
- K. W. Miller, international energy and infrastructure executive

=== General election ===
==== Predictions ====
Source	Ranking	As of
The Cook Political Report	Likely R	July 2, 2020
FiveThirtyEight	Likely R	October 19, 2020
Inside Elections	Likely R	October 16, 2020
Sabato's Crystal Ball	Likely R	October 20, 2020
Politico	Lean R	November 2, 2020
Daily Kos	Likely R	October 19, 2020
RCP	Safe R	June 9, 2020
Niskanen	Tossup	July 26, 2020

==== Polling ====
Poll source	Date(s) administered	Sample size	Margin of error	Brian Mast (R)	Pam Keith (D)	K. W. Miller (I)	Undecided
Clearview Research (D) (Note: Poll sponsored by Keith's campaign)	October 7–9, 2020	301 (LV)	–	43%	45%	4%	–
St. Pete Polls	September 18, 2020	1,149 (LV)	± 2.9%	50%	42%	2%	5%

==== Results ====
Florida's 18th congressional district, 2020
Party	Candidate	Votes	%
Republican	Brian Mast (incumbent)	253,286	56.32%
Democratic	Pam Keith	186,674	41.50%
Independent	K. W. Miller	9,760	2.17%
Total votes		449,720	100.0
Republican hold			

===== County results =====
	Brian Mast Republican		Pam Keith Democratic		K. W. Miller Independent		Margin		Total
County	Votes	%	Votes	%	Votes	%	Votes	%	Votes
Martin	64,874	66.15%	31,205	31.82%	1,991	2.03%	33,669	34.33%	98,070
Palm Beach	99,734	55.18%	77,238	42.73%	3,769	2.09%	22,496	12.45%	180,741
St. Lucie	88,678	51.89%	78,231	45.77%	4,000	2.34%	10,447	6.11%	170,909

== District 19 ==
2020 Florida's 19th congressional district election
- November 3, 2020
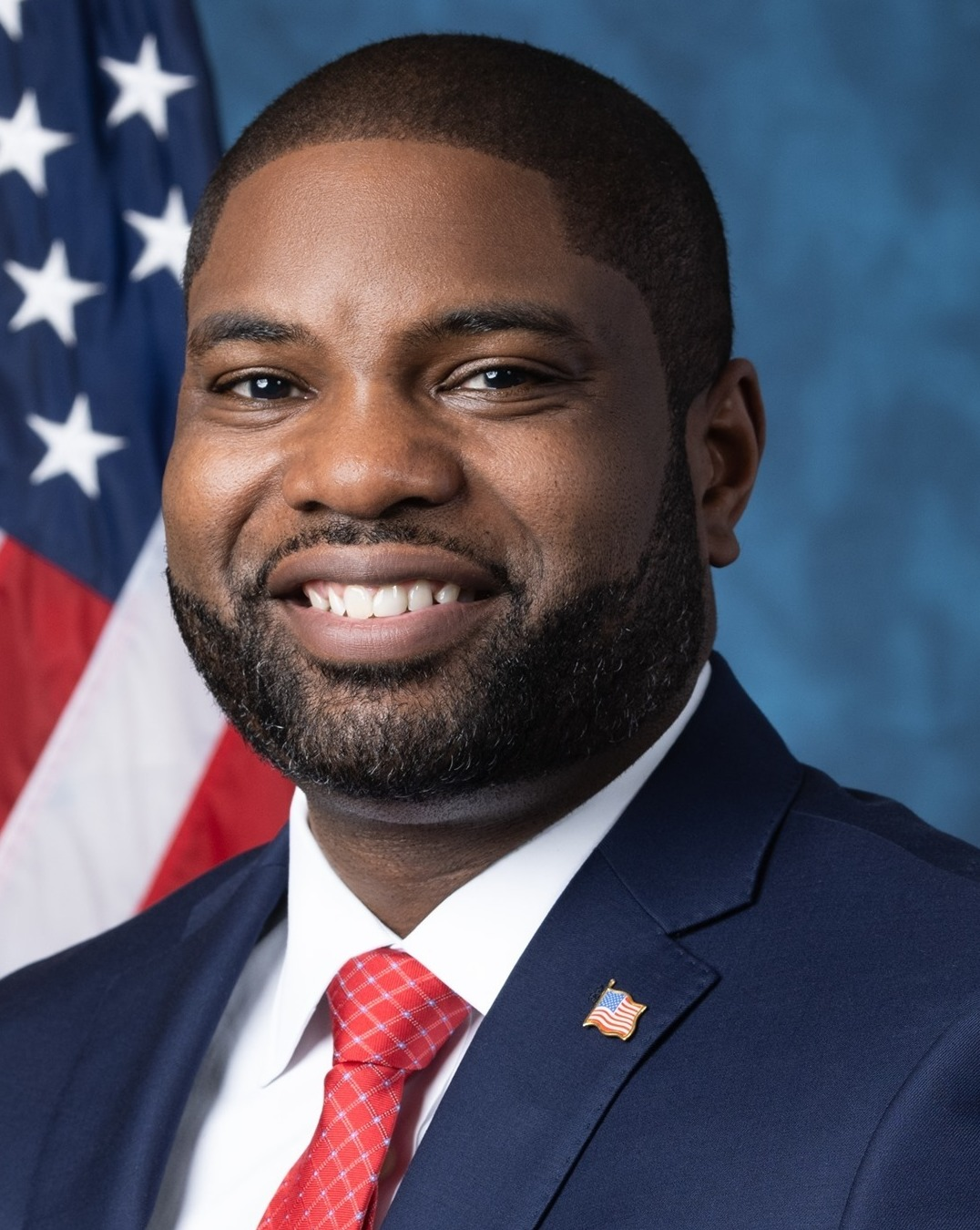

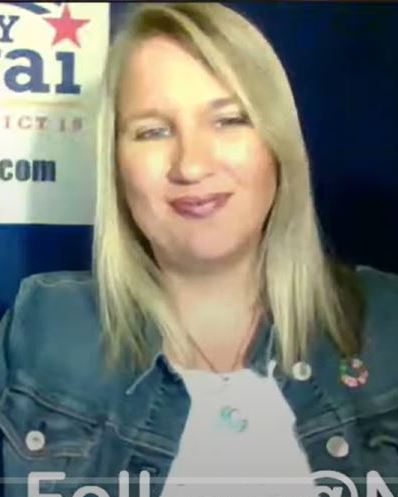
Nominee	Byron Donalds	Cindy Banyai
Party	Republican	Democratic
Popular vote	272,440	172,146
Percentage	61.27%	38.72%
- Precinct results Donalds: 50–60% 60–70% 70–80% Banyai: 50–60% 60–70% 70–80%
U.S. Representative before election
Francis Rooney
Republican
Elected U.S. Representative
Byron Donalds
Republican

The 19th district includes most of Southwest Florida, and includes parts of Lee and Collier counties. The district includes the cities of Cape Coral, Fort Myers, Estero, Bonita Springs and Naples. Republican Francis Rooney, who had represented the district since 2017, was reelected with 62% of the vote in 2018. On October 19, 2019, Rooney announced he would not seek re-election.

=== Republican primary ===
Republican primary by precinct Map legend: Donalds—>40%; Donalds—35–40%; Donalds—30–35%; Donalds—25–30%; Donalds—20–25%; Eagle—>40%; Eagle—35—40%; Eagle—30—35%; Eagle—25—30%; Eagle—20—25%; Askar—35—40%; Askar—25—30%; Askar—20—25%; Figlesthaler—25—30%; Figlesthaler—20—25%; Henderson—35—40%; Henderson—25—30%; Henderson—20—25%; Tie

==== Candidates ====
===== Nominee =====
- Byron Donalds, state representative and candidate for this district in 2012

===== Eliminated in primary =====
- Darren Aquino, disabilities activist and actor
- Casey Askar, businessman and U.S. Marine Corps veteran
- Dane Eagle, majority leader of the Florida House of Representatives (endorsed Donalds after primary loss)
- William Figlesthaler, urologist
- Randy Henderson, mayor of Fort Myers
- Daniel Kowal, Collier County sheriff's deputy
- Christy McLaughlin, activist
- Dan Severson, former Minnesota state representative and nominee for Minnesota secretary of state in 2014

===== Withdrawn =====
- Heather Fitzenhagen, state representative (ran for state senate)

===== Declined =====
- Gary Aubuchon, former state representative (endorsed Eagle)
- Lizbeth Benacquisto, state senator
- Matt Caldwell, former state representative (endorsed Eagle)
- Chauncey Goss, son of former U.S. representative Porter Goss and candidate for Florida's 19th congressional district in 2016
- Brian Hamman, Lee County commissioner
- Matt Hudson, former state representative
- Steve Martin, attorney
- Jim Oberweis, Illinois state senator and nominee for U.S. Senate in Illinois in 2014 (running for IL-14)
- Kathleen Passidomo, state senator
- Cecil Pendergrass, Lee County commissioner
- Spencer Roach, state representative (endorsed Eagle)
- Bob Rommel, state representative
- Francis Rooney, incumbent U.S. representative
- Mike Scott, former Lee County sheriff
- Drew Steele, local Fox News Radio host

==== Endorsements ====
Darren Aquino

Organizations

- New York Young Republican Club
Byron Donalds

Federal officials

- Donald Trump, president of the United States

Organizations

- NRA Political Victory Fund
Dane Eagle

Federal officials

- Gus Bilirakis, U.S. representative (FL-12)

State officials

- Gary Aubuchon, former state representative (2007–2013)
- Lizbeth Benacquisto, state senator and former state Senate majority leader (2012–2014) and Republican candidate in 2014 FL-19 special election
- Matt Caldwell, former state representative (2010–2018)
- Jeff Kottkamp, former lieutenant governor (2007–2011)
- Spencer Roach, state representative
- Ray Rodrigues, state representative
Heather Fitzenhagen (withdrew)

Organizations

- Maggie's List
Dan Severson

Individuals

- Michael Johns, former White House speechwriter for George H. W. Bush
- Tim Pawlenty, 2012 Republican presidential candidate and former governor of Minnesota (2003–2011)

==== Polling ====
Poll source	Date(s) administered	Sample size	Margin of error	Casey Askar	Byron Donalds	Dane Eagle	William Figlesthaler	Randy Henderson	Other	Undecided
St. Pete Polls	August 16, 2020	439 (LV)	± 4.7%	22%	23%	16%	16%	11%	8% (Note: Aquino with 3%; Severson with 2%; Kowal and McLaughlin with 1%)	4%
St. Pete Polls	August 3, 2020	525 (LV)	± 4.3%	16%	22%	20%	21%	8%	6%	14%
Data Targeting/Dane Eagle (Note: Poll conducted by Eagle's campaign)	July 23, 2020	282 (LV)	± 5.7%	15%	21%	23%	19%	6%	3% (Note: Aquino, McLaughlin and Severson with 1%; Kowal with 0%)	8%
St. Pete Polls	July 6, 2020	503 (LV)	± 4.3%	30%	26%	7%	16%	5%	4% (Note: Aquino and McLaughlin with 2%; Kowal and Severson with 0%)	12%

==== Primary results ====
Republican primary results
Party	Candidate	Votes	%
Republican	Byron Donalds	23,492	22.6
Republican	Dane Eagle	22,715	21.9
Republican	Casey Askar	20,774	20.0
Republican	William Figlesthaler	19,075	18.3
Republican	Randy Henderson	7,858	7.6
Republican	Christy McLaughlin	4,245	4.1
Republican	Dan Severson	3,197	3.1
Republican	Darren Aquino	1,466	1.4
Republican	Daniel Kowal	1,135	1.1
Total votes		103,957	100.0

=== Democratic primary ===
==== Candidates ====
===== Nominee =====
- Cindy Banyai, political science professor at Florida Gulf Coast University

===== Eliminated in primary =====
- David Holden, financial advisor and nominee for Florida's 19th congressional district in 2018

==== Endorsements ====
Cindy Banyai

==== Primary results ====
Democratic primary results
Party	Candidate	Votes	%
Democratic	Cindy Banyai	28,765	57.6
Democratic	David Holden	21,212	42.4
Total votes		49,977	100.0

=== Independent and third-party candidates ===
==== Independents ====
===== Declared =====
- Patrick Post (write-in), president of Sustainable Planet USA

===== Withdrawn =====
- Antonio Dumornay, housing activist

=== General election ===
==== Debate ====
2020 Florida's 19th congressional district debate
No.	Date	Host	Moderator	Link	Republican	Democratic
Key: P Participant A Absent N Not invited I Invited W Withdrawn						
Key: P Participant A Absent N Not invited I Invited W Withdrawn					Byron Donalds	Cindy Banyai
1	Sep. 30, 2020	WGCU (TV)			P	P

==== Predictions ====
Source	Ranking	As of
The Cook Political Report	Safe R	July 2, 2020
FiveThirtyEight	Safe R	October 15, 2020
Inside Elections	Safe R	June 2, 2020
Sabato's Crystal Ball	Safe R	July 2, 2020
Politico	Safe R	April 19, 2020
Daily Kos	Safe R	June 3, 2020
RCP	Safe R	June 9, 2020
Niskanen	Safe R	June 7, 2020

==== Results ====
Florida's 19th congressional district, 2020
Party	Candidate	Votes	%
Republican	Byron Donalds	272,440	61.27%
Democratic	Cindy Banyai	172,146	38.72%
Independent	Patrick Post (write-in)	3	0.01%
Total votes		444,589	100.0
Republican hold			

===== County results =====
	Byron Donalds Republican		Cindy Banyai Democratic		Patrick Post Independent		Margin		Total
County	Votes	%	Votes	%	Votes	%	Votes	%	Votes
Collier	69,227	65.41%	36,612	34.59%	1	0.00%	32,615	30.82%	105,840
Lee	203,213	59.99%	135,534	40.01%	2	0.00%	67,679	19.98%	338,749

== District 20 ==
2020 Florida's 20th congressional district election
- November 3, 2020
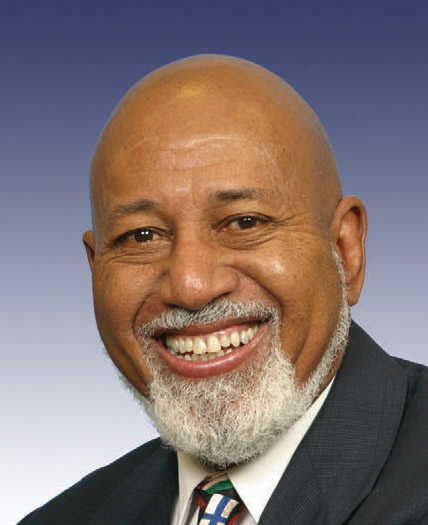

Nominee	Alcee Hastings	Greg Musselwhite
Party	Democratic	Republican
Popular vote	253,661	68,748
Percentage	78.67%	21.32%
- Hastings: 50–60% 60–70% 70–80% 80–90% >90% Musselwhite: 50–60% 60–70% 70–80% 80–90% >90% Tie: 50% No data
U.S. Representative before election
Alcee Hastings
Democratic
Elected U.S. Representative
Alcee Hastings
Democratic

The 20th district is located in South Florida, and includes parts of Broward and Palm Beach counties. The district includes the cities of Fort Lauderdale, Pompano Beach, and Belle Glade. Democrat Alcee Hastings, who had represented the district since 1993, was re-elected unopposed in 2018.

=== Democratic primary ===
==== Candidates ====
===== Nominee =====
- Alcee Hastings, incumbent U.S. representative

===== Eliminated in primary =====
- Sheila Cherfilus-McCormick, attorney and candidate for Florida's 20th congressional district in 2018

===== Withdrawn =====
- Roshan Mody, co-founder of Plus1 Vote
- Emmanuel Morel, former federal investigator for the U.S. Department of Labor and candidate for Florida's 21st congressional district in 2014

==== Primary results ====
Democratic primary results
Party	Candidate	Votes	%
Democratic	Alcee Hastings (incumbent)	62,759	69.3
Democratic	Sheila Cherfilus-McCormick	27,831	30.7
Total votes		90,590	100.0

=== Republican primary ===
==== Candidates ====
===== Declared =====
- Vic DeGrammont, realtor
- Greg Musselwhite, welding inspector

==== Primary results ====
Republican primary results
Party	Candidate	Votes	%
Republican	Greg Musselwhite	5,394	52.0
Republican	Vic DeGrammont	4,975	48.0
Total votes		10,369	100.0

=== General election ===
==== Predictions ====
Source	Ranking	As of
The Cook Political Report	Safe D	July 2, 2020
FiveThirtyEight	Safe D	October 15, 2020
Inside Elections	Safe D	June 2, 2020
Sabato's Crystal Ball	Safe D	July 2, 2020
Politico	Safe D	April 19, 2020
Daily Kos	Safe D	June 3, 2020
RCP	Safe D	June 9, 2020
Niskanen	Safe D	June 7, 2020

==== Results ====
Florida's 20th congressional district, 2020
Party	Candidate	Votes	%
Democratic	Alcee Hastings (incumbent)	253,661	78.67%
Republican	Greg Musselwhite	68,748	21.32%
Total votes		322,409	100.0
Democratic hold			

===== County results =====
	Alcee Hastings Democratic		Greg Musselwhite Republican		Margin		Total
County	Votes	%	Votes	%	Votes	%	Votes
Broward	186,909	81.72%	41,803	18.28%	145,106	63.44%	228,712
Palm Beach	66,752	71.24%	26,945	28.76%	39,807	42.48%	93,697

== District 21 ==
2020 Florida's 21st congressional district election
- November 3, 2020
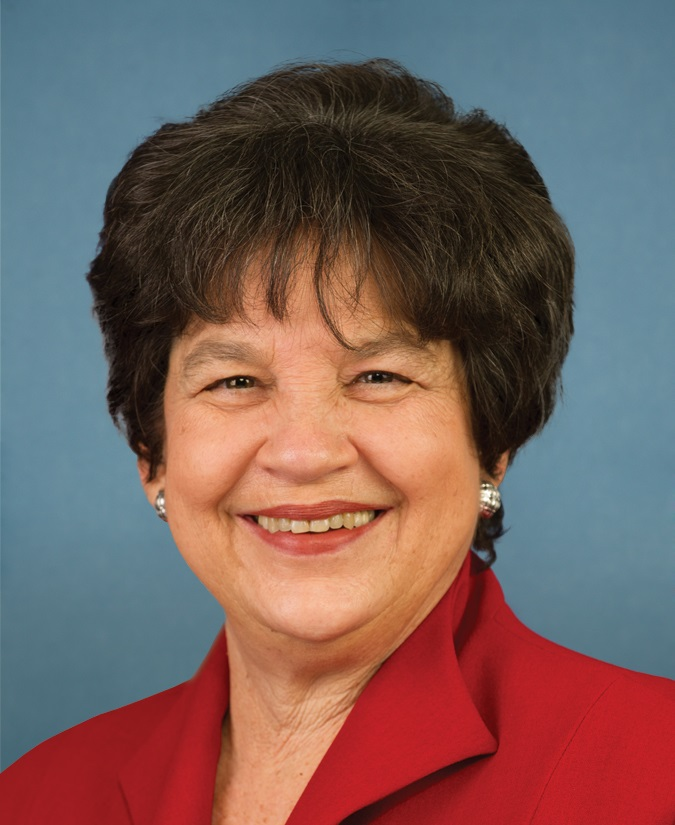

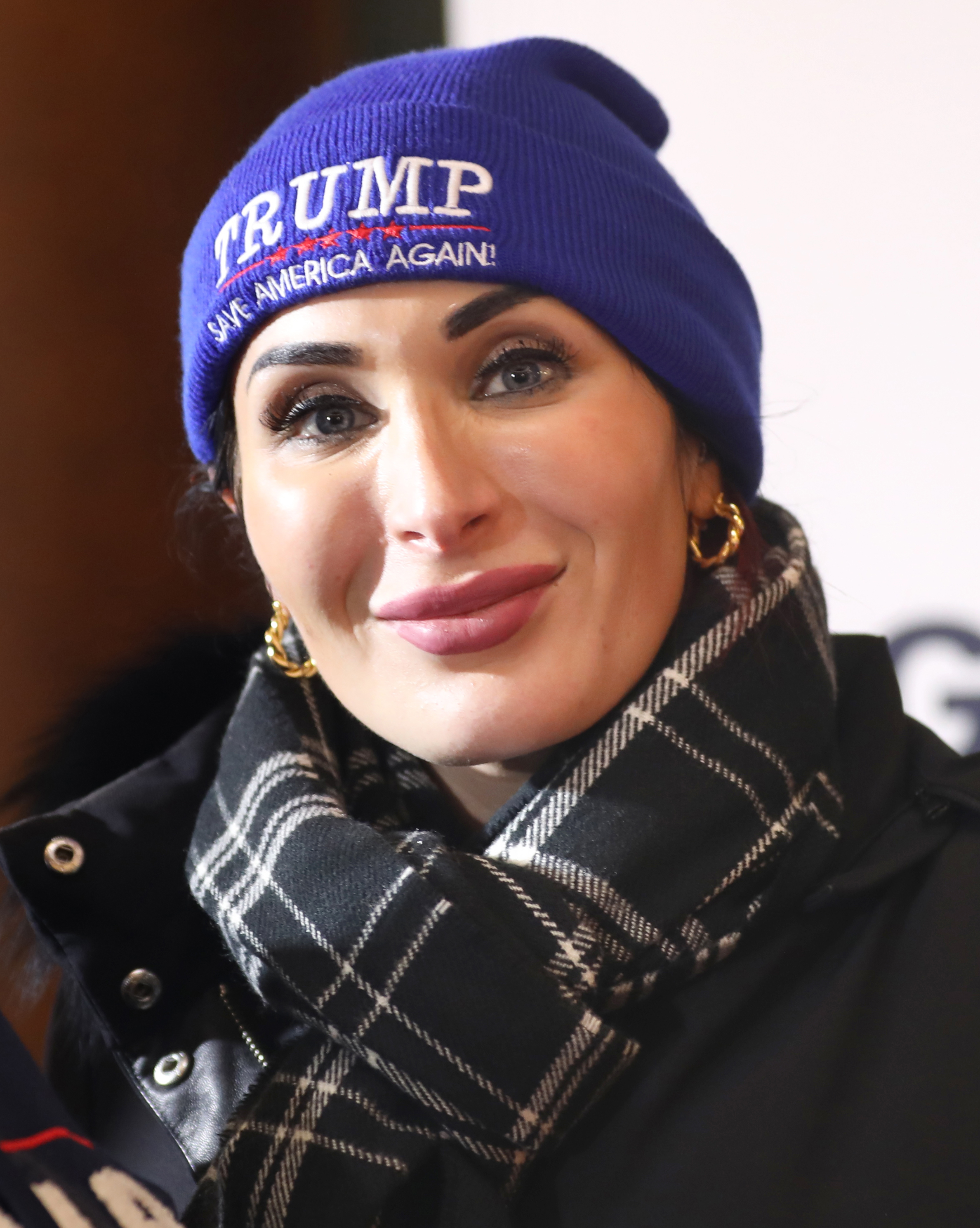
Nominee	Lois Frankel	Laura Loomer
Party	Democratic	Republican
Popular vote	237,925	157,612
Percentage	59.02%	39.10%
- Precinct results Frankel: 40–50% 50–60% 60–70% 70–80% 80–90% >90% Loomer: 40–50% 50–60% 60–70% 70–80% 80–90% >90% Tie: 50% No data
U.S. Representative before election
Lois Frankel
Democratic
Elected U.S. Representative
Lois Frankel
Democratic

The 21st district is located in South Florida, and includes part of Palm Beach County. The district includes the cities of West Palm Beach, Boynton Beach, and Wellington. Democrat Lois Frankel, who had represented the district since 2013, was re-elected unopposed in 2018.

=== Democratic primary ===
==== Candidates ====
===== Nominee =====
- Lois Frankel, incumbent U.S. representative

===== Eliminated in primary =====
- Guido Weiss, former advisor to U.S. Representative Tulsi Gabbard

===== Withdrawn =====
- Adam Aarons, film producer and actor

==== Endorsements ====
Lois Frankel

Organizations

- Planned Parenthood
- Sierra Club

==== Primary results ====
Democratic primary results
Party	Candidate	Votes	%
Democratic	Lois Frankel (incumbent)	75,504	86.0
Democratic	Guido Weiss	12,308	14.0
Total votes		87,812	100.0

=== Republican primary ===
==== Candidates ====
===== Nominee =====
- Laura Loomer, reporter for InfoWars, conspiracy theorist, and far-right activist

===== Eliminated in primary =====
- Christian Acosta, nuclear engineer and Palm Beach State College professor
- Elizabeth Felton, animal rights activist
- Aaron Scanlan, U.S. Air Force veteran
- Reba Sherrill, health activist
- Michael Vilardi, retired Internal Revenue Service agent

===== Disqualified =====
- Michael Bluemling Jr., U.S. Army veteran
- Victor Garcia da Rosa, businessman

==== Endorsements ====
Laura Loomer

U.S. presidents

- Donald Trump, president of the United States (2017–2021)

U.S. representatives

- Matt Gaetz, U.S. representative (FL-01) (2017–present)
- Paul Gosar, U.S. representative from (AZ-04) (2013–present), (AZ-01) (2011–2013)

Local officials

- Jeanine Pirro, district attorney of Westchester County (1994–2005), chair of the New York State Commission on Domestic Violence Fatalities (1994–1997), judge of the Westchester County Court (1991–1993)

Individuals

- Roseanne Barr, actress
- Juanita Broaddrick, political activist, Bill Clinton accuser, and former nursing home administrator
- Marjorie Taylor Greene, businesswoman, conspiracy theorist and Republican nominee for Georgia's 14th congressional district in the 2020 elections
- Alex Jones, far-right radio show host, political extremist and conspiracy theorist
- Michelle Malkin, conservative columnist
- Gavin McInnes, far-right political commentator and founder of the Proud Boys
- Wayne Allyn Root, conservative author, radio host, conspiracy theorist, and Libertarian nominee for vice president of the United States in 2008
- Bo Snerdley, call screener, producer, and engineer for The Rush Limbaugh Show
- Roger Stone, political consultant
- Milo Yiannopoulos, far-right political commentator

==== Polling ====
Poll source	Date(s) administered	Sample size	Margin of error	Laura Loomer	Other
The Washington Sentinel (Note: Poll conducted by Loomer's campaign)	Released June 20, 2020	– (Note: Not yet released)	–	51%	≥4% (Note: "Nearest competitor to Laura Loomer" with 4%)

==== Primary results ====
Republican primary results
Party	Candidate	Votes	%
Republican	Laura Loomer	14,526	42.5
Republican	Christian Acosta	8,724	25.5
Republican	Michael Vilardi	4,194	12.3
Republican	Aaron Scanlan	3,221	9.4
Republican	Elizabeth Felton	2,421	7.1
Republican	Reba Sherrill	1,070	3.1
Total votes		34,156	100.0

=== Independent and third-party candidates ===
==== Independents ====
===== Declared =====
- Sylvia Caravetta (write-in), activist
- Charleston Malkemus, technology executive and U.S. Marine Corps veteran

==== Independent Republicans ====
===== Declared =====
- Piotr Blass (write-in), former professor and perennial candidate

=== General election ===
==== Predictions ====
Source	Ranking	As of
The Cook Political Report	Safe D	July 2, 2020
FiveThirtyEight	Safe D	October 15, 2020
Inside Elections	Safe D	June 2, 2020
Sabato's Crystal Ball	Safe D	July 2, 2020
Politico	Safe D	April 19, 2020
Daily Kos	Safe D	June 3, 2020
RCP	Safe D	June 9, 2020
Niskanen	Safe D	June 7, 2020

==== Polling ====
Poll source	Date(s) administered	Sample size	Margin of error	Lois Frankel (D)	Laura Loomer (R)	Charleston Malkemus (I)	Undecided
St. Pete Polls/Florida Politics	October 2, 2020	1,015 (LV)	± 3.1%	61%	33%	2%	5%

==== Results ====
Florida’s 21st congressional district, 2020
Party	Candidate	Votes	%
Democratic	Lois Frankel (incumbent)	237,925	59.02%
Republican	Laura Loomer	157,612	39.10%
Independent	Charleston Malkemus	7,544	1.87%
Independent	Sylvia Caravetta (write-in)	8	0.01%
Republican	Piotr Blass (write-in)	4	0.01%
Total votes		403,093	100.0
Democratic hold			

===== County results =====
	Lois Frankel Democratic		Laura Loomer Republican		Charleston Malkemus Independent		Sylvia Caravetta Independent		Piotr Blass Republican		Margin		Total
County	Votes	%	Votes	%	Votes	%	Votes	%	Votes	%	Votes	%	Votes
Palm Beach	237,925	59.02%	157,612	39.10%	7,544	1.87%	8	0.00%	4	0.00%	80,313	19.92%	403,093

== District 22 ==
2020 Florida's 22nd congressional district election
- November 3, 2020
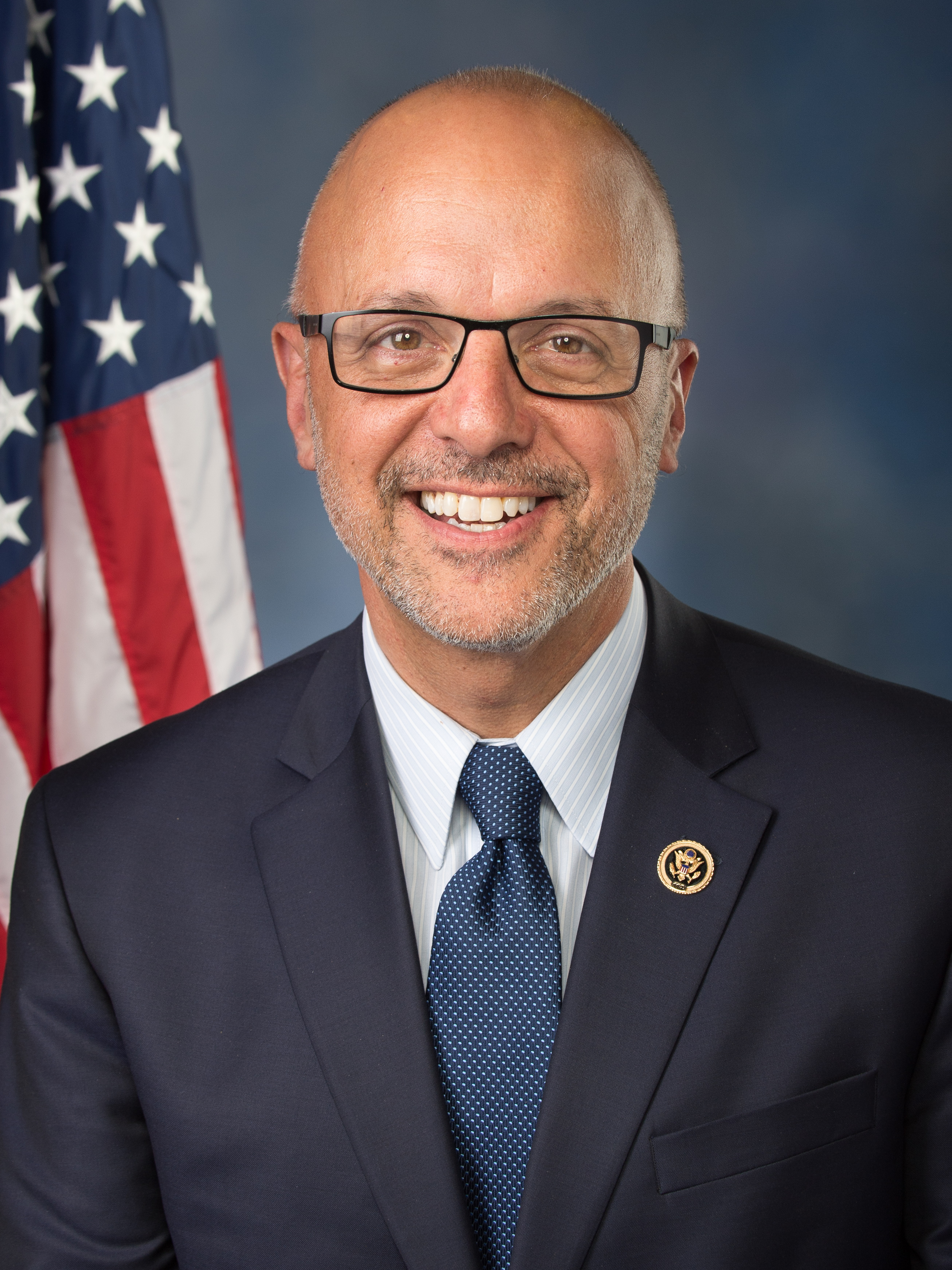

Nominee	Ted Deutch	James Pruden
Party	Democratic	Republican
Popular vote	235,764	166,553
Percentage	58.60%	41.39%
- Precinct results Deutch: 50–60% 60–70% 70–80% 80–90% >90% Pruden: 50–60% 60–70% 70–80% Tie: 50% No data
U.S. Representative before election
Ted Deutch
Democratic
Elected U.S. Representative
Ted Deutch
Democratic

The 22nd district is located in South Florida, and includes parts of Broward and Palm Beach counties. The district includes the cities of Boca Raton, Deerfield Beach, and Coral Springs. Democrat Ted Deutch, who had represented the district since 2010, was re-elected with 62% of the vote in 2018.

=== Democratic primary ===
==== Candidates ====
===== Nominee =====
- Ted Deutch, incumbent U.S. representative

=== Republican primary ===
==== Candidates ====
===== Nominee =====
- James Pruden, attorney

===== Eliminated in primary =====
- Fran Flynn, businesswoman
- Jessi Melton, president of Paragon Wireless Group
- Darlene Swaffar, insurance agent

==== Endorsements ====
James Pruden

Newspapers

- Sun-Sentinel

==== Primary results ====
Republican primary results
Party	Candidate	Votes	%
Republican	James Pruden	11,840	35.6
Republican	Jessica Melton	9,969	30.0
Republican	Fran Flynn	8,667	26.1
Republican	Darlene Swaffar	2,763	8.3
Total votes		33,239	100.0

=== General election ===
==== Predictions ====
Source	Ranking	As of
The Cook Political Report	Safe D	July 2, 2020
FiveThirtyEight	Safe D	October 15, 2020
Inside Elections	Safe D	June 2, 2020
Sabato's Crystal Ball	Safe D	July 2, 2020
Politico	Safe D	April 19, 2020
Daily Kos	Safe D	June 3, 2020
RCP	Safe D	June 9, 2020
Niskanen	Safe D	June 7, 2020

==== Results ====
Florida's 22nd congressional district, 2020
Party	Candidate	Votes	%
Democratic	Ted Deutch (incumbent)	235,764	58.60%
Republican	James Pruden	166,553	41.39%
Total votes		402,317	100.0
Democratic hold			

===== County results =====
	Ted Deutch Democratic		James Pruden Republican		Margin		Total
County	Votes	%	Votes	%	Votes	%	Votes
Broward	192,923	59.96%	128,851	40.04%	64,072	19.91%	321,774
Palm Beach	42,841	53.19%	37,702	46.81%	5,139	6.38%	80,543

== District 23 ==
2020 Florida's 23rd congressional district election
- November 3, 2020
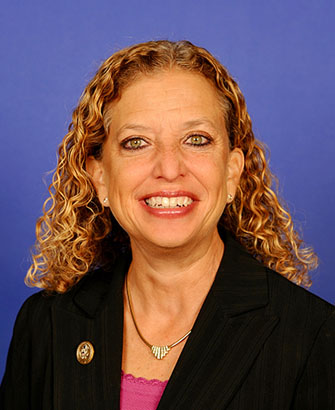

Nominee	Debbie Wasserman Schultz	Carla Spalding
Party	Democratic	Republican
Popular vote	221,239	158,874
Percentage	58.19%	41.78%
- Precinct results Schultz: 50–60% 60–70% 70–80% 80–90% Spalding: 40–50% 50–60% 60–70% 70–80% No data
U.S. Representative before election
Debbie Wasserman Schultz
Democratic
Elected U.S. Representative
Debbie Wasserman Schultz
Democratic

The 23rd district is located in South Florida, and includes parts of Broward and Miami-Dade counties. The district includes the cities of Pembroke Pines, Davie, and Aventura. Democrat Debbie Wasserman Schultz, who had represented the district since 2005, was re-elected with 58% of the vote in 2018.

=== Democratic primary ===
==== Candidates ====
===== Nominee =====
- Debbie Wasserman Schultz, incumbent U.S. representative

===== Eliminated in primary =====
- Jen Perelman, attorney

==== Endorsements ====
Jen Perelman

Individuals

- Marianne Williamson, author and 2020 Democratic presidential candidate
- Andrew Yang, non-profit leader, 2020 Democratic presidential candidate and ambassador for entrepreneurship under President Obama

Organizations

- 350 Action
- American Progressives in STEM
- Brand New Congress
- Our Revolution – Broward chapter
Debbie Wasserman Schultz

Organizations

- League of Conservation Voters Action Fund
- Planned Parenthood
- Sierra Club

Newspapers

- South Florida Sun Sentinel

==== Primary results ====
Democratic primary results
Party	Candidate	Votes	%
Democratic	Debbie Wasserman Schultz (incumbent)	55,729	72.0
Democratic	Jen Perelman	21,631	28.0
Total votes		77,360	100.0

=== Republican primary ===
==== Candidates ====
===== Nominee =====
- Carla Spalding, nurse, independent candidate for Florida's 18th congressional district in 2016, and candidate for Florida's 23rd congressional district in 2018

===== Eliminated in primary =====
- Michael Kroske, businessman

===== Withdrew =====
- Richard Mendelson, former teacher at Marjory Stoneman Douglas High School

==== Primary results ====
Republican primary results
Party	Candidate	Votes	%
Republican	Carla Spalding	12,751	51.3
Republican	Michael Kroske	12,116	48.7
Total votes		24,867	100.0

=== Independent and third-party candidates ===
==== Independent Republicans ====
===== Declared =====
- D. B. Fugate (write-in), entrepreneur and U.S. Air Force veteran
- Jeff Olson (write-in), real estate agent

=== General election ===
==== Predictions ====
Source	Ranking	As of
The Cook Political Report	Safe D	July 2, 2020
FiveThirtyEight	Safe D	October 15, 2020
Inside Elections	Safe D	June 2, 2020
Sabato's Crystal Ball	Safe D	July 2, 2020
Politico	Safe D	April 19, 2020
Daily Kos	Safe D	June 3, 2020
Niskanen	Safe D	June 7, 2020
RCP	Safe D	June 9, 2020

==== Results ====
Florida's 23rd congressional district, 2020
Party	Candidate	Votes	%
Democratic	Debbie Wasserman Schultz (incumbent)	221,239	58.19%
Republican	Carla Spalding	158,874	41.78%
Republican	Jeff Olson (write-in)	46	0.01%
Republican	D. B. Fugate (write-in)	37	0.01%
Total votes		381,196	100.0
Democratic hold			

===== County results =====
	Debbie Wasserman Schultz Democratic		Carla Spalding Republican		Jeff Olson Republican		D. B. Fugate Republican		Margin		Total
County	Votes	%	Votes	%	Votes	%	Votes	%	Votes	%	Votes
Broward	203,940	58.96%	141,886	41.02%	42	0.01%	33	0.01%	62,054	17.94%	345,901
Miami-Dade	17,299	50.44%	16,988	49.53%	4	0.01%	4	0.01%	311	0.91%	34,295

== District 24 ==
2020 Florida's 24th congressional district election
- November 3, 2020
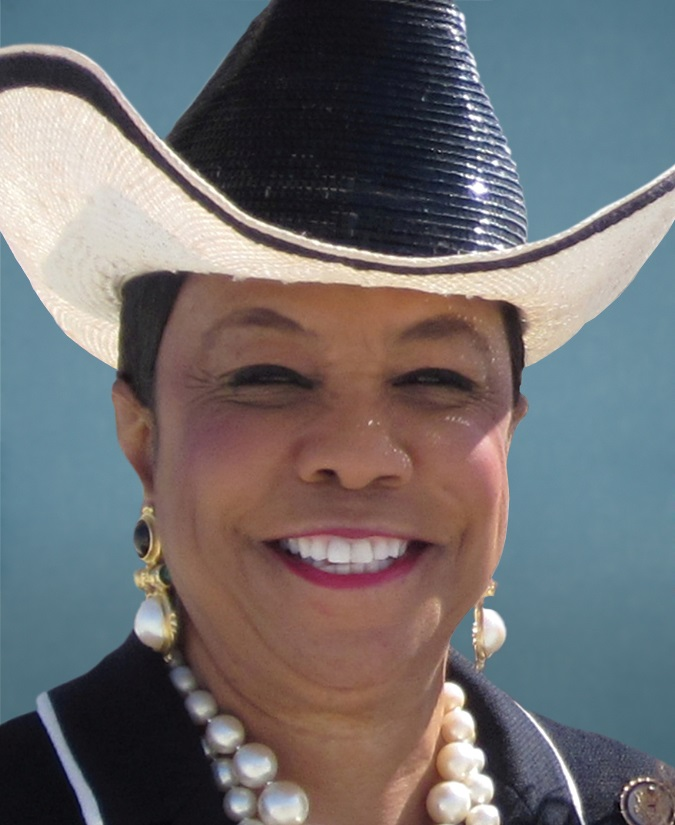

Nominee	Frederica Wilson	Lavern Spicer
Party	Democratic	Republican
Popular vote	218,825	59,084
Percentage	75.55%	20.39%
- Precinct results Wilson: 40–50% 50–60% 60–70% 70–80% 80–90% >90% Spicer: 40–50% 50–60% >90% Tie: 40–50% 50% No data
U.S. Representative before election
Frederica Wilson
Democratic
Elected U.S. Representative
Frederica Wilson
Democratic

The 24th district is located in South Florida, and includes parts of Broward and Miami-Dade counties. The district includes the cities of Miami, Miami Gardens, and Hollywood. Democrat Frederica Wilson, who had represented the district since 2011, was re-elected unopposed in 2018.

=== Democratic primary ===
==== Candidates ====
===== Nominee =====
- Frederica Wilson, incumbent U.S. representative

===== Eliminated in primary =====
- Ricardo de La Fuente, perennial candidate and son of Rocky De La Fuente
- Sakinah Lehtola, progressive activist

==== Endorsements ====
Frederica Wilson

Organizations

- National Organization for Women
- Planned Parenthood
- Sierra Club

==== Primary results ====
Democratic primary results
Party	Candidate	Votes	%
Democratic	Frederica Wilson (incumbent)	68,505	84.7
Democratic	Sakinah Lehtola	6,267	7.7
Democratic	Ricardo de La Fuente	6,134	7.6
Total votes		80,906	100.0

=== Republican primary ===
==== Candidates ====
===== Nominee =====
- Lavern Spicer, nonprofit executive

=== Independent and third-party candidates ===
==== Libertarians ====
===== Withdrawn =====
- Courtney Omega-Turner, Coconut Grove village councilwoman

==== Independent Republicans ====
===== Declared =====
- Howard Knepper (write-in), businessman and candidate for U.S. Senate in 2010, 2016, and 2018

==== Independents ====
===== Declared =====
- Christine Alexandria Olivo, activist
- Hector Rivera (write-in), real estate broker

=== General election ===
==== Predictions ====
Source	Ranking	As of
The Cook Political Report	Safe D	July 2, 2020
FiveThirtyEight	Safe D	October 15, 2020
Inside Elections	Safe D	June 2, 2020
Sabato's Crystal Ball	Safe D	July 2, 2020
Politico	Safe D	April 19, 2020
Daily Kos	Safe D	June 3, 2020
RCP	Safe D	June 9, 2020
Niskanen	Safe D	June 7, 2020

==== Results ====
Florida's 24th congressional district, 2020
Party	Candidate	Votes	%
Democratic	Frederica Wilson (incumbent)	218,825	75.55%
Republican	Lavern Spicer	59,084	20.39%
Independent	Christine Olivo	11,703	4.04%
Republican	Howard Knepper (write-in)	17	0.01%
Independent	Hector Rivera (write-in)	9	0.01%
Total votes		289,638	100.0
Democratic hold			

===== County results =====
	Frederica Wilson Democratic		Lavern Spicer Republican		Christine Olivo Independent		Howard Knepper Republican		Hector Rivera Independent		Margin		Total
County	Votes	%	Votes	%	Votes	%	Votes	%	Votes	%	Votes	%	Votes
Broward	24,817	67.93%	10,079	27.59%	1,632	4.47%	3	0.01%	0	0.00%	14,738	40.34%	36,531
Miami-Dade	194,008	76.65%	49,005	19.36%	10,071	3.98%	14	0.01%	9	0.00%	145,003	57.29%	253,107

== District 25 ==
2020 Florida's 25th congressional district election
- November 3, 2020
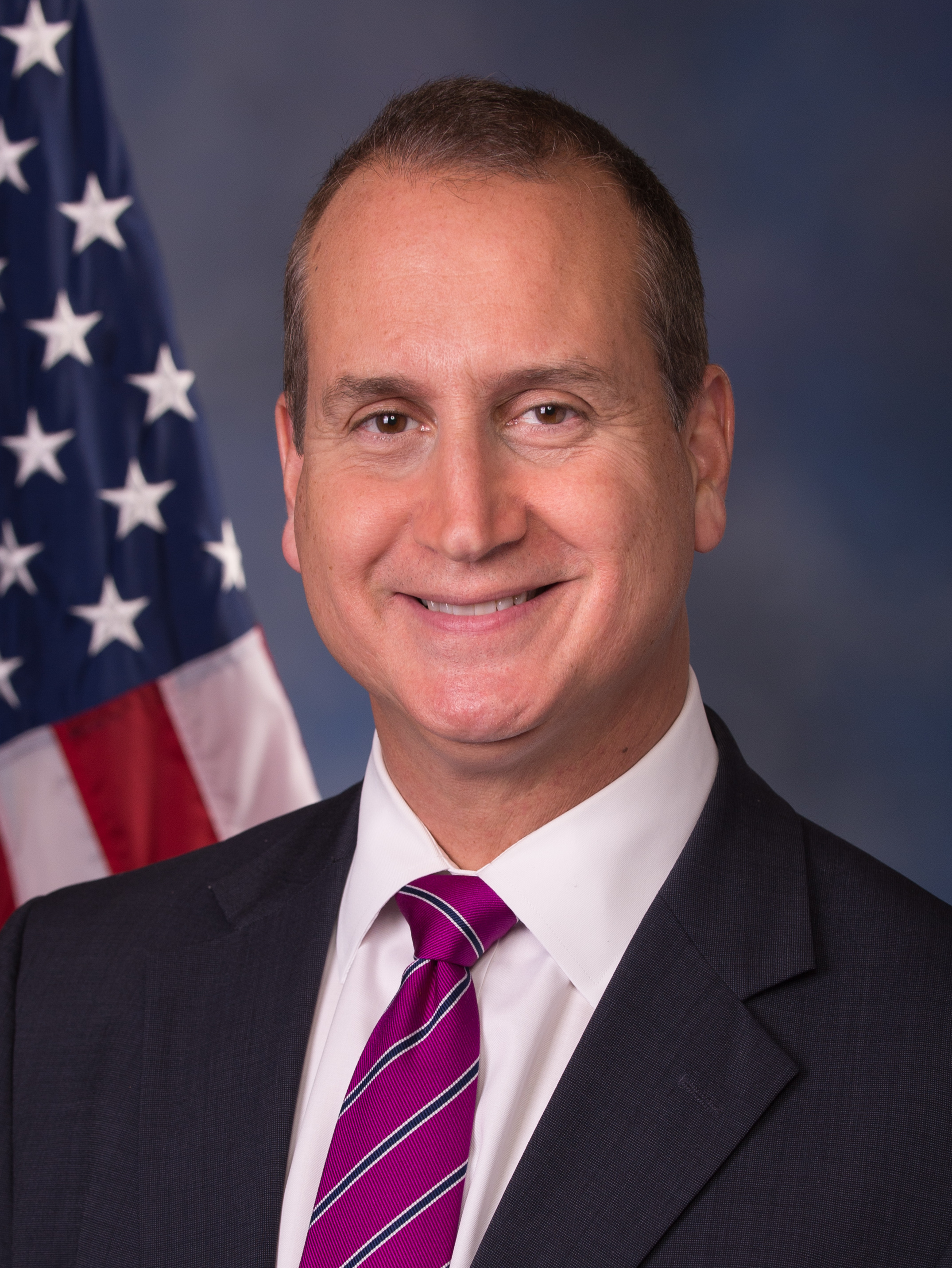
Nominee	Mario Díaz-Balart (Uncontested)
Party	Republican
- Precinct results Díaz-Balart: >90%
U.S. Representative before election
Mario Díaz-Balart
Republican
Elected U.S. Representative
Mario Díaz-Balart
Republican

The 25th district is located in South Florida and stretches into parts of Southwest Florida and the Florida Heartland, and includes all of Hendry County, as well as parts of Miami-Dade and Collier counties. The district includes the cities of Hialeah, Doral, and Clewiston. Republican Mario Díaz-Balart, who had represented the district since 2003, was re-elected with 60% of the vote in 2018.

=== Republican primary ===
==== Candidates ====
===== Nominee =====
- Mario Díaz-Balart, incumbent U.S. representative

=== Democratic primary ===
==== Candidates ====
===== Disqualified =====
- Yadira Escobar, blogger

=== General election ===
==== Predictions ====
Source	Ranking	As of
The Cook Political Report	Safe R	July 2, 2020
FiveThirtyEight	Safe R	October 15, 2020
Inside Elections	Safe R	June 2, 2020
Sabato's Crystal Ball	Safe R	July 2, 2020
Politico	Safe R	September 9, 2020
Daily Kos	Safe R	June 3, 2020
RCP	Safe R	October 15, 2020
Niskanen	Safe R	June 7, 2020

==== Results ====
Florida's 25th congressional district, 2020
Party	Candidate	Votes	%
Republican	Mario Díaz-Balart (incumbent)	—	Uncontested
Total votes		—	—
Republican hold			

== District 26 ==
2020 Florida's 26th congressional district election
- November 3, 2020
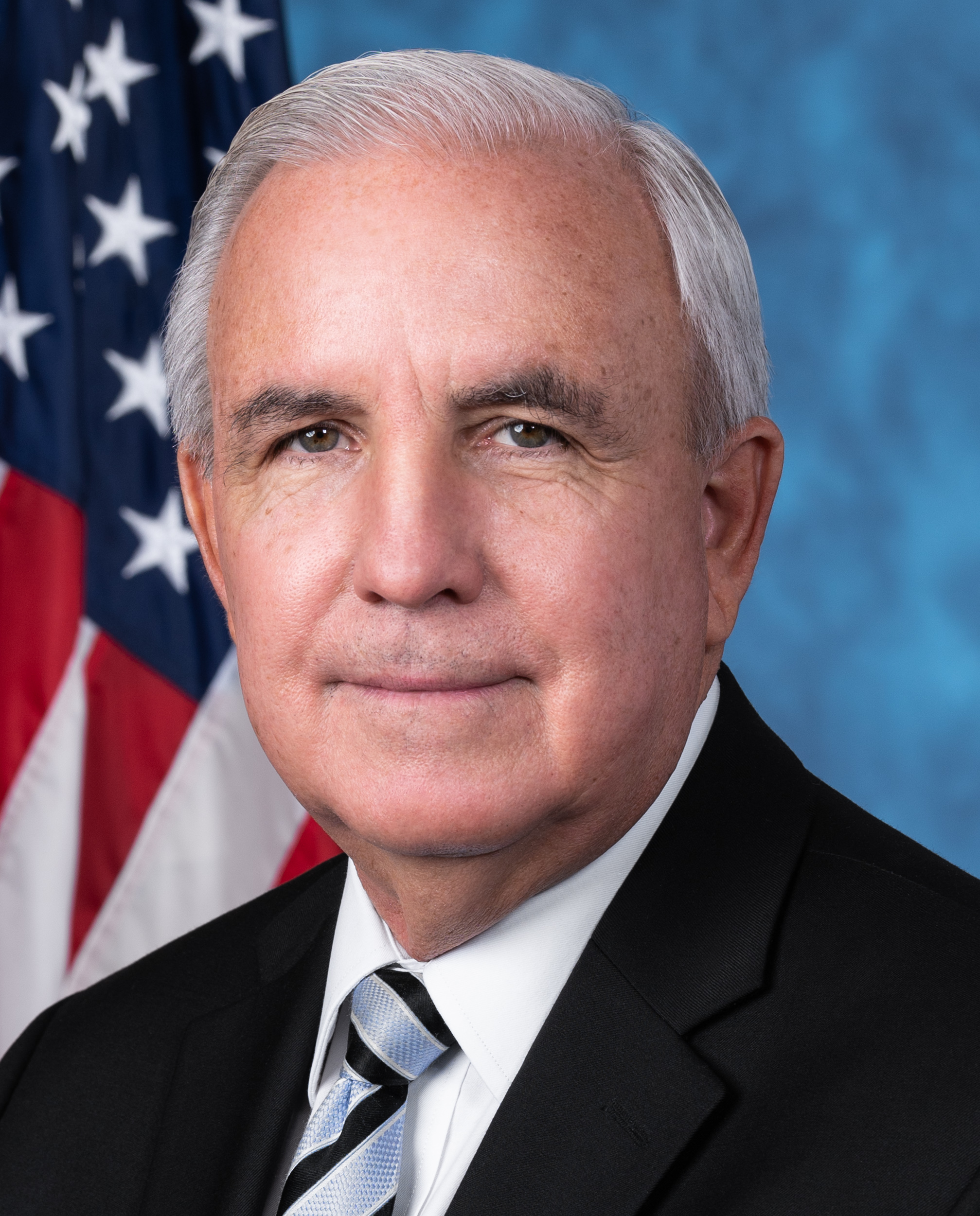

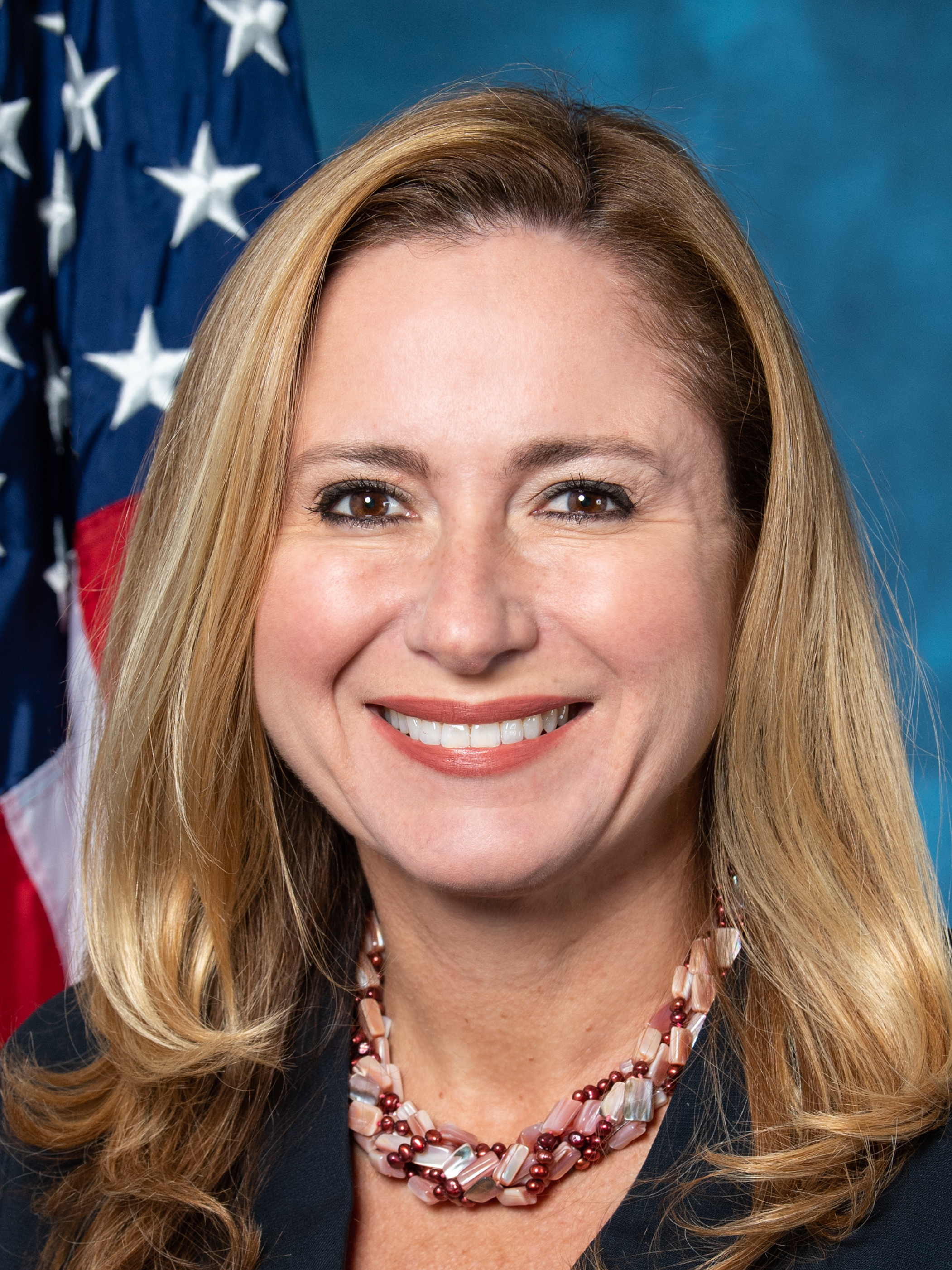
Nominee	Carlos Giménez	Debbie Mucarsel-Powell
Party	Republican	Democratic
Popular vote	177,223	165,407
Percentage	51.72%	48.27%
- Precinct results Giménez: 50–60% 60–70% 70–80% >90% Mucarsel-Powell: 50–60% 60–70% 70–80% 80–90% Tie: 50% No data
U.S. Representative before election
Debbie Mucarsel-Powell
Democratic
Elected U.S. Representative
Carlos Giménez
Republican

The 26th district is located in South Florida and the Florida Keys, and includes all of Monroe County and part of Miami-Dade County. The district includes the cities of Homestead, Kendale Lakes, and Key West. Democrat Debbie Mucarsel-Powell, who had represented the district since 2019, flipped the district and was elected with 50% of the vote in 2018.

This district was included on the list of Democratic-held seats the National Republican Congressional Committee targeted in 2020.

=== Democratic primary ===
==== Candidates ====
===== Nominee =====
- Debbie Mucarsel-Powell, incumbent U.S. representative

=== Republican primary ===
==== Candidates ====
===== Nominee =====
- Carlos A. Giménez, mayor of Miami-Dade County

===== Eliminated in primary =====
- Omar Blanco, former president of the Metro-Dade Firefighters Local 1403

===== Withdrew =====
- José Peixoto, engineer and candidate for Florida's 26th congressional district in 2012 and 2016
- Irina Vilariño, restaurateur

===== Declined =====
- Carlos Curbelo, former U.S. representative
- Louis Sola, Federal maritime commissioner and candidate for Florida's 24th congressional district in 2018

==== Endorsements ====
Carlos A. Giménez

Federal officials

- Donald Trump, 45th president of the United States (2017–2021)

==== Polling ====
Poll source	Date(s) administered	Sample size	Margin of error	Omar Blanco	Carlos Giménez	Other	Undecided
Unspecified national Republican organization	October 13–15, 2019	≈136 (LV) (Note: 34% of a sample of 400 likely voters)	–	6%	51%	2% (Note: Irina Vilariño with 2%)	39%

==== Primary results ====
Republican primary results
Party	Candidate	Votes	%
Republican	Carlos A. Giménez	29,480	59.9
Republican	Omar Blanco	19,721	40.1
Total votes		49,201	100.0

==== Endorsements ====
Debbie Mucarsel-Powell (D)

U.S. presidents

- Barack Obama, 44th president of the United States (2009–2017), U.S. senator from Illinois (2005–2008)

Organizations

- Black Economic Alliance
- EMILY's List
- End Citizens United
- High School Democrats of America
- J Street PAC
- League of Conservation Voters Action Fund
- NARAL Pro-Choice America
- New Democrat Coalition
- Planned Parenthood
- Sierra Club

=== General election ===
==== Predictions ====
Source	Ranking	As of
The Cook Political Report	Lean D	October 21, 2020
FiveThirtyEight	Likely D	October 19, 2020
Inside Elections	Tilt D	October 16, 2020
Sabato's Crystal Ball	Lean D	November 2, 2020
Politico	Lean D	November 2, 2020
Daily Kos	Tossup	June 3, 2020
RCP	Tossup	October 15, 2020
Niskanen	Safe D	June 7, 2020

==== Polling ====
Poll source	Date(s) administered	Sample size	Margin of error	Debbie Murcasel-Powell (D)	Carlos Giménez (R)	Other/ Undecided
Meeting Street Insights (R) (Note: Poll conducted for the Congressional Leadership Fund.)	July 14–18, 2020	400 (RV)	± 4.9%	42%	47%	11%
Unspecified national Republican organization	October 13–15, 2019	400 (LV)	± 4.9%	42%	45%	–

==== Results ====
Florida's 26th congressional district, 2020
Party	Candidate	Votes	%
Republican	Carlos A. Giménez	177,223	51.72%
Democratic	Debbie Mucarsel-Powell (incumbent)	165,407	48.27%
Total votes		342,630	100.0
Republican gain from Democratic			

===== County results =====
	Carlos A. Giménez Republican		Debbie Mucarsel-Powell Democratic		Margin		Total
County	Votes	%	Votes	%	Votes	%	Votes
Miami-Dade	151,669	51.30%	144,010	48.70%	7,659	2.59%	295,679
Monroe	25,554	54.43%	21,397	45.57%	4,157	8.85%	46,951

== District 27 ==
2020 Florida's 27th congressional district election
- November 3, 2020
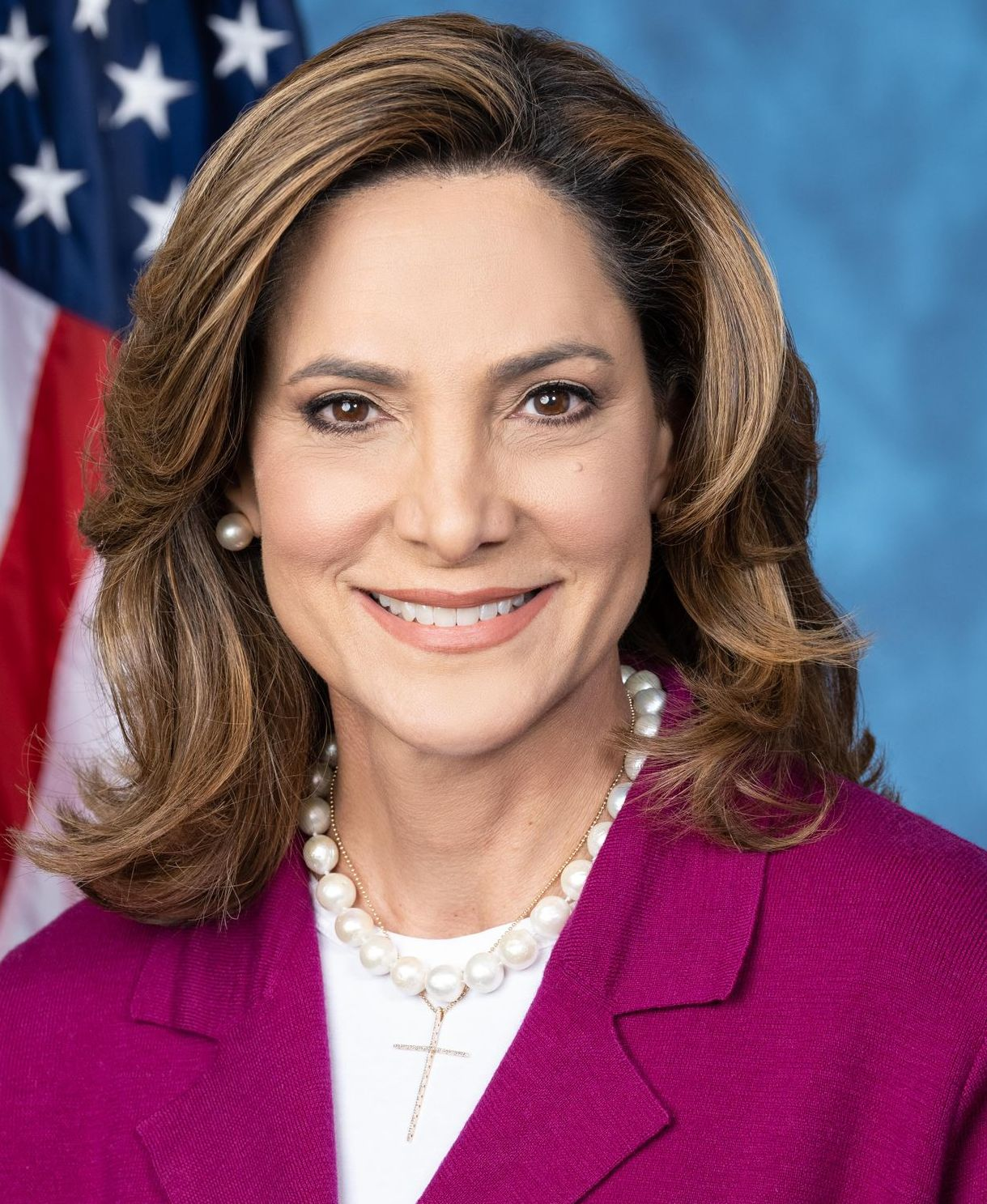

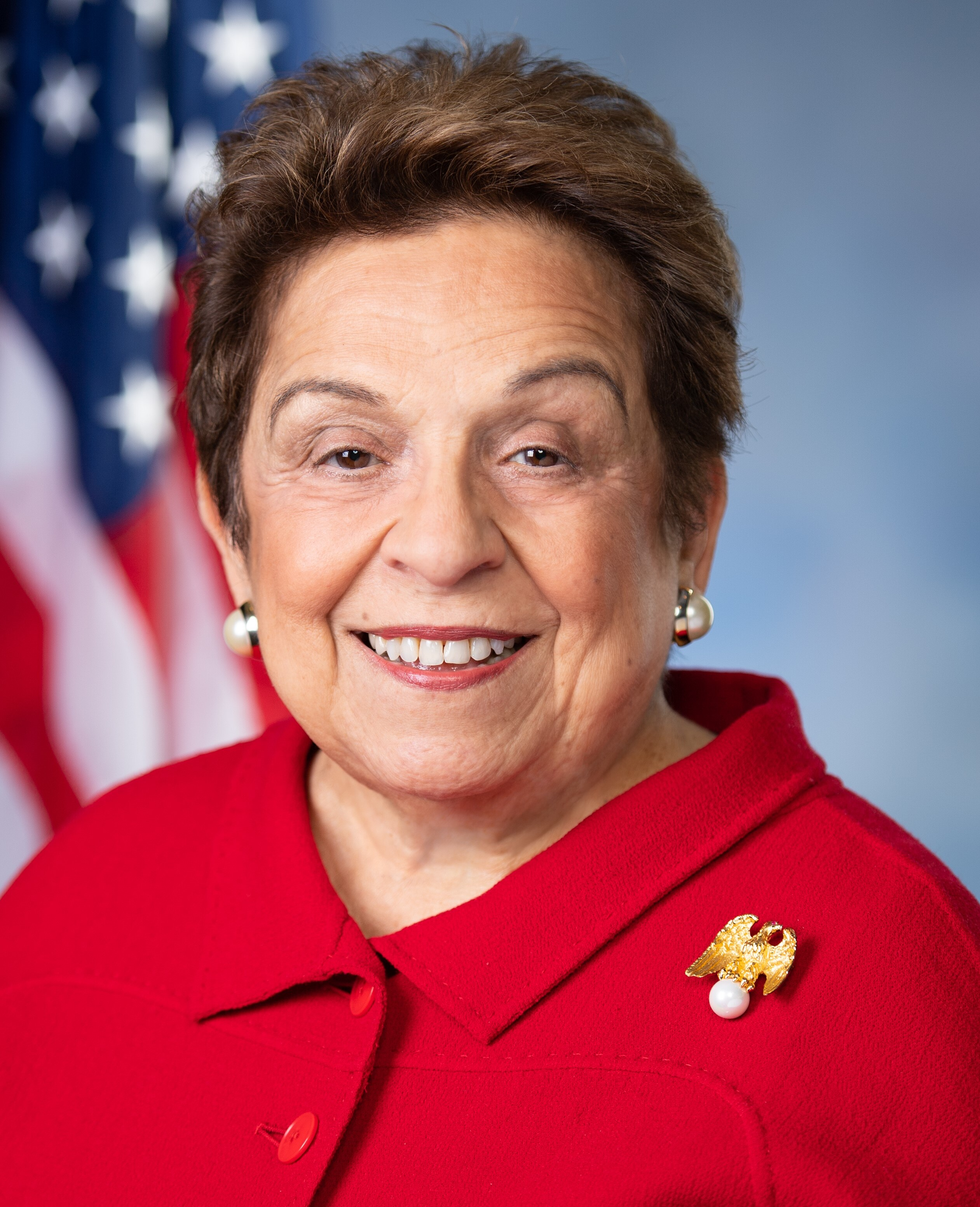
Nominee	María Elvira Salazar	Donna Shalala
Party	Republican	Democratic
Popular vote	176,141	166,758
Percentage	51.36%	48.62%
- Precinct results Salazar: 40–50% 50–60% 60–70% 70–80% 80–90% >90% Shalala: 40–50% 50–60% 60–70% 70–80% 80–90% >90% No data
U.S. Representative before election
Donna Shalala
Democratic
Elected U.S. Representative
Maria Elvira Salazar
Republican

The 27th district is located in South Florida, and includes part of Miami-Dade County. The district includes the cities of Coral Gables, Kendall, and Miami Beach, as well as the neighborhood of Little Havana in Miami. Democrat Donna Shalala, who had represented the district since 2019, flipped the district and was elected with 52% of the vote in 2018. This district was included on the list of Democratic-held seats the National Republican Congressional Committee targeted in 2020. Despite being the heavy favorite, Shalala was unseated by Salazar.

=== Democratic primary ===
==== Candidates ====
===== Nominee =====
- Donna Shalala, incumbent U.S. representative

===== Withdrawn =====
- Michael Hepburn, University of Miami academic adviser

==== Endorsements ====
Donna Shalala

U.S. presidents

- Barack Obama, 44th president of the United States (2009–2017), U.S. senator from Illinois (2005–2008)

Organizations

- EMILY's List
- J Street PAC
- League of Conservation Voters Action Fund
- National Women's Political Caucus
- Planned Parenthood
- Sierra Club

=== Republican primary ===
==== Candidates ====
===== Nominee =====
- Maria Elvira Salazar, journalist and nominee for Florida's 27th congressional district in 2018

===== Eliminated in primary =====
- Juan Fiol, real estate agent
- Raymond Molina, banker and Brigade 2506 veteran

==== Endorsements ====
Maria Elvira Salazar

U.S. presidents

- Donald Trump, 45th president of the United States (2017–2021)

U.S. representatives

- Ileana Ros-Lehtinen, former U.S. representative from Florida

Organizations

- New York Young Republican Club
- Susan B. Anthony List

==== Primary results ====
Republican primary results
Party	Candidate	Votes	%
Republican	Maria Elvira Salazar	39,687	79.1
Republican	Raymond Molina	5,497	10.9
Republican	Juan Fiol	5,018	10.0
Total votes		50,202	100.0

=== Independent and third-party candidates ===
==== Independent Republicans ====
===== Declared =====
- Frank Polo (write-in), businessman

=== General election ===
==== Predictions ====
Source	Ranking	As of
The Cook Political Report	Likely D	July 2, 2020
FiveThirtyEight	Likely D	October 15, 2020
Inside Elections	Safe D	June 2, 2020
Sabato's Crystal Ball	Likely D	July 2, 2020
Politico	Likely D	April 19, 2020
Daily Kos	Lean D	June 3, 2020
RCP	Likely D	October 15, 2020
Niskanen	Safe D	June 7, 2020

==== Polling ====
Poll source	Date(s) administered	Sample size	Margin of error	Donna Shalala (D)	Maria Salazar (R)	Other/ Undecided
Bendixen & Amandi Research (D) (Note: Poll sponsored by Shalala's campaign)	October 9–13, 2020	500 (LV)	± 4.4%	50%	43%	7%
1892 Polling (R) (Note: Poll sponsored by Salazar's campaign)	September 2–6, 2020	400 (LV)	± 4.9%	43%	46%	–

==== Results ====
Florida's 27th congressional district, 2020
Party	Candidate	Votes	%
Republican	Maria Elvira Salazar	176,141	51.35%
Democratic	Donna Shalala (incumbent)	166,758	48.62%
Republican	Frank Polo (write-in)	76	0.01%
Total votes		342,975	100.0
Republican gain from Democratic			

===== County results =====
	Maria Elvira Salazar Republican		Donna Shalala Democratic		Frank Polo Republican		Margin		Total
County	Votes	%	Votes	%	Votes	%	Votes	%	Votes
Miami-Dade	176,141	51.36%	166,758	48.62%	76	0.02%	9,383	2.74%	342,975

== See also ==
- Florida elections, 2020
- Elections in Florida
- Politics of Florida
  - Political party strength in Florida
  - Florida Democratic Party
  - Republican Party of Florida
- Government of Florida

== Notes ==
Partisan clients
