= 2022 United States House of Representatives elections in Florida =

- November 8, 2022

All 28 Florida seats to the United States House of Representatives
	Majority party	Minority party
Party	Republican	Democratic
Last election	16	11
Seats won	20	8
Seat change	▲4	▼3
Popular vote	4,271,296	2,905,713
Percentage	58.25%	39.63%
Swing	▲6.15%	▼6.42%

Republican
50–60%
60–70%
70–80%
80–90%
90>%
Democratic
50–60%
60–70%
70–80%

The 2022 United States House of Representatives elections in Florida were held on November 8, 2022, to elect the 28 U.S. representatives from Florida, one from each of the state's 28 congressional districts. The primary was held on August 23, 2022. The elections coincided with the 2022 United States Senate election in Florida, other elections to the House of Representatives, other elections to the United States Senate, and various state and local elections.

The Republican Party gained four seats, increasing their majority from 16–11 to 20–8. No Republican lost re-election.

== Results summary ==
=== Statewide ===
Party	Candi- dates	Votes		Seats		
Party	Candi- dates	No.	%	No.	+/–	%
Republican Party	28	4,271,196	58.25%	20	▲4	71.43%
Democratic Party	25	2,905,702	39.63%	8	▼3	28.57%
Libertarian Party	2	80,370	1.10%	0	Steady	0%
Independent	8	75,036	1.02%	0	Steady	0%
Total	61	7,332,304	100%	28	▲1	100%

Popular vote
Republican	58.26%
Democratic	40.4%
Libertarian	1.09%
Independent	0.26%

House seats
Republican	71.43%
Democratic	28.57%

=== District ===
Results of the 2022 United States House of Representatives elections in Florida by district:

District	Republican		Democratic		Others		Total		Result
District	Votes	%	Votes	%	Votes	%	Votes	%	Result
District 1	197,349	67.86%	93,467	32.14%	0	0%	290,816	100.00%	Republican hold
District 2	180,236	59.8%	121,153	40.2%	0	0%	301,389	100.00%	Republican hold
District 3	178,101	62.52%	103,382	36.29%	3,410	1.2%	284,893	100.00%	Republican hold
District 4	165,696	60.45%	108,402	39.45%	5	<0.01%	274,103	100.00%	Republican gain
District 5	0	-	0	-	0	-	0	100.00%	Republican hold
District 6	226,548	75.33%	0	0%	74,207	24.67%	300,755	100.00%	Republican hold
District 7	177,966	58.53%	126,079	41.47%	10	<0.01%	304,055	100.00%	Republican gain
District 8	222,128	64.91%	120,080	35.09%	0	0%	342,208	100.00%	Republican hold
District 9	93,827	46.36%	108,541	53.64%	0	0%	202,368	100.00%	Democratic hold
District 10	78,844	38.44%	117,955	59.00%	3,111	1.56%	199,910	100.00%	Democratic hold
District 11	205,995	63.07%	115,647	35.41%	4,967	1.52%	326,609	100.00%	Republican hold
District 12	226,583	70.38%	95,377	29.62%	4	<0.01%	321,964	100.00%	Republican hold
District 13	181,487	53.14%	153,876	45.05%	6,183	1.81%	341,546	100.00%	Republican gain
District 14	113,427	43.1%	149,737	56.9%	0	0%	263,164	100.00%	Democratic hold
District 15	145,219	58.54%	102,835	41.46%	0	0%	248,054	100.00%	Republican gain
District 16	189,762	62.14%	115,575	37.85%	21	0.01%	305,358	100.00%	Republican hold
District 17	222,601	63.85%	123,822	35.51%	2,226	0.64%	348,649	100.00%	Republican hold
District 18	167,429	74.67%	0	0%	56,805	25.33%	224,234	100.00%	Republican hold
District 19	213,035	68.00%	100,226	31.99%	13	0%	313,274	100.00%	Republican hold
District 20	52,151	27.69%	136,215	72.31%	0	0%	188,366	100.00%	Democratic hold
District 21	208,614	63.5%	119,891	36.5%	0	0%	328,505	100.00%	Republican hold
District 22	122,194	44.89%	150,010	55.11%	0	0%	272,204	100.00%	Democratic hold
District 23	130,681	46.83%	143,951	51.59%	4,417	1.58%	279,049	100.00%	Democratic hold
District 24	52,449	28.21%	133,442	71.79%	0	0%	185,891	100.00%	Democratic hold
District 25	105,239	44.91%	129,113	55.09%	0	%	234,352	100.00%	Democratic hold
District 26	143,240	70.87%	58,868	29.13%	0	0%	202,108	100.00%	Republican hold
District 27	136,038	57.29%	101,404	42.71%	0	0%	237,442	100.00%	Republican hold
District 28	134,457	63.68%	76,665	36.31%	28	0.01%	211,150	100.00%	Republican hold
Total	4,271,296	58.25%	2,905,713	39.63%	145,406	2.12%	7,332,415	100.00%	

== District 1 ==
2022 Florida's 1st congressional district election
- November 8, 2022
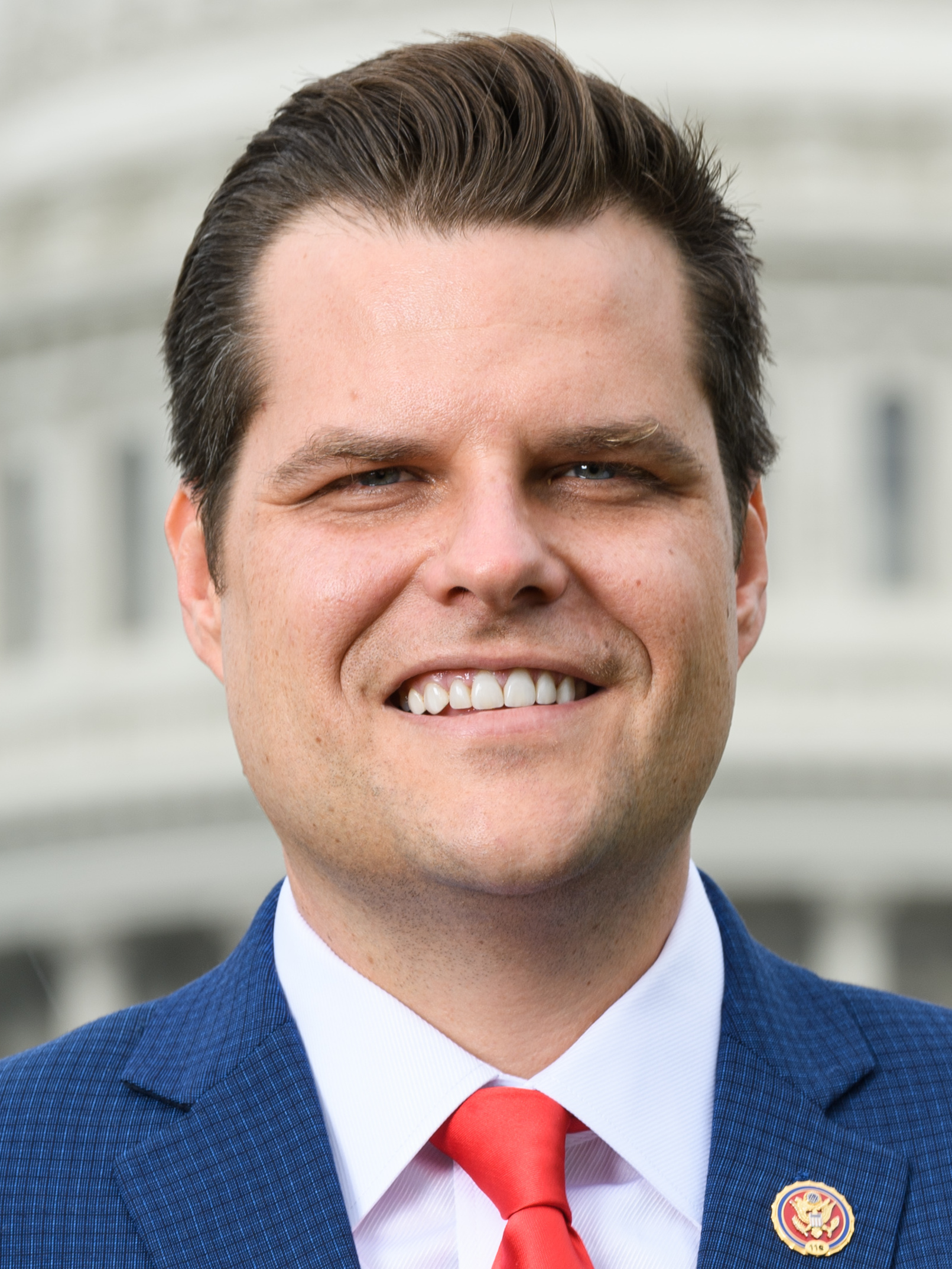

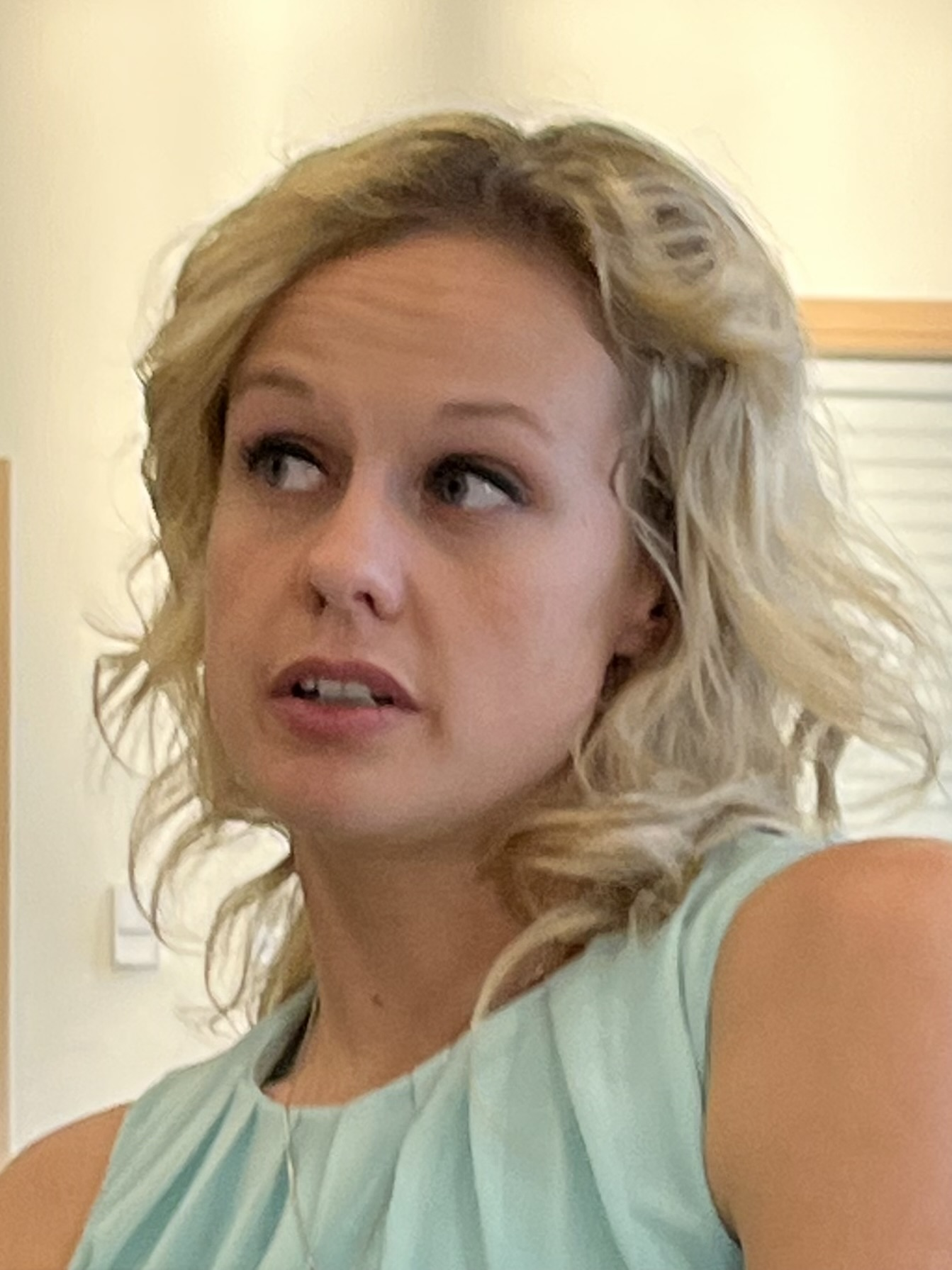
Nominee	Matt Gaetz	Rebekah Jones
Party	Republican	Democratic
Popular vote	197,349	93,467
Percentage	67.86%	32.14%
- Gaetz: 50–60% 60–70% 70–80% 80–90% >90% Jones: 50–60% 60–70% 70–80% 80–90% >90%
U.S. Representative before election
Matt Gaetz
Republican
Elected U.S. Representative
Matt Gaetz
Republican

Republican Matt Gaetz, who had represented the district since 2017, was re-elected with 64.6% of the vote in 2020. He won re-election in 2022.

The 1st district contains all of Escambia, Okaloosa and Santa Rosa counties, as well as the western portion of Walton county. Following redistricting the district shrank somewhat, losing its portion of Holmes County and part of Walton County.

Despite losing by an overwhelming margin, Jones ended up being the biggest overperformer in this election cycle for a Florida congressional candidate when compared to the top of the ticket. Jones outperformed Val Demings, the Democratic nominee for the concurrent U.S. Senate race, by approximately 9 percentage points, and Charlie Crist, the Democratic nominee for Florida governor, by about 11 percentage points within this district's borders. However, this likely had to do with the numerous scandals that faced Matt Gaetz.

=== Republican primary ===
==== Candidates ====
===== Nominee =====
- Matt Gaetz, incumbent U.S. representative

===== Eliminated in primary =====
- Mark Lombardo, Marine combat veteran, former FedEx executive and pilot
- Greg Merk, former U.S. Air Force officer and candidate for this district in 2020

===== Withdrawn =====
- Bryan Jones, pilot
- Angela Marie Walls-Windhauser, perennial candidate

===== Declined =====
- Alex Andrade, state representative (running for re-election)
- Doug Bates, attorney
- Doug Broxson, state senator (running for re-election)
- Chris Dosev, businessman and candidate for this district in 2016 and 2018
- George Gainer, state senator (running for re-election)
- Ashton Hayward, former mayor of Pensacola
- Mike Hill, former state representative
- Larry Keefe, former U.S. attorney for the Northern District of Florida
- Carolyn Ketchel, Okaloosa County commissioner
- Laura Loomer, reporter for InfoWars, far-right activist, and nominee for Florida's 21st congressional district in 2020 (running in the 11th district)
- Anna Paulina Luna, director of Hispanic Engagement for Turning Point USA and nominee for Florida's 13th congressional district in 2020 (running in the 13th district)
- Jimmy Patronis, chief financial officer of Florida (running for re-election)
- Grover Robinson IV, mayor of Pensacola
- Anthony Sabatini, state representative (running in the 7th district)
- Frank White, former state representative and candidate for Florida attorney general in 2018
- Jayer Williamson, state representative (running for re-election)

==== Endorsements ====
Matt Gaetz

Executive branch officials

- Donald Trump, 45th president of the United States (2017–2021)

==== Results ====
Republican primary county results: Map legend: Gaetz—70–80%; Gaetz—60–70%

Republican primary results
Party	Candidate	Votes	%
Republican	Matt Gaetz (incumbent)	73,374	69.7
Republican	Mark Lombardo	25,720	24.4
Republican	Greg Merk	6,170	5.9
Total votes		105,264	100.0

=== Democratic primary ===
==== Candidates ====
===== Nominee =====
- Rebekah Jones, former Florida Department of Health analyst (disqualified, granted stay order by appellate court, then reinstated to ballot)

===== Eliminated in primary =====
- Peggy Schiller, attorney

===== Declined =====
- Dianne Krumel, Florida Democratic Party committeewoman
- Lumon May, Escambia County commissioner
- Jennifer Zimmerman, pediatrician and nominee for this district in 2018

==== Results ====
Democratic primary county results: Map legend: Jones—60–70%

Democratic primary results
Party	Candidate	Votes	%
Democratic	Rebekah Jones	21,875	62.6
Democratic	Peggy Schiller	13,091	37.4
Total votes		34,966	100.0

=== General election ===
==== Debate ====
2022 Florida's 1st congressional district debate
No.	Date	Host	Moderator	Link	Republican	Democratic
Key: P Participant A Absent N Not invited I Invited W Withdrawn						
Key: P Participant A Absent N Not invited I Invited W Withdrawn					Matt Gaetz	Rebekah Jones
1	Oct. 20, 2022	League of Women Voters; Pensacola State College; WSRE	Mollye Barrows; Sandra Averhart	WSRE	P	P

==== Predictions ====
Source	Ranking	As of
The Cook Political Report	Solid R	April 25, 2022
Inside Elections	Solid R	May 17, 2022
Sabato's Crystal Ball	Safe R	April 27, 2022
Politico	Solid R	April 28, 2022
RCP	Safe R	June 9, 2022
Fox News	Solid R	July 11, 2022
DDHQ	Solid R	July 20, 2022
538	Solid R	June 30, 2022
The Economist	Safe R	September 28, 2022

==== Polling ====
Poll source	Date(s) administered	Sample size	Margin of error	Matt Gaetz (R)	Rebekah Jones (D)	Undecided
The Listener Group/The Political Matrix (R)	September 22–26, 2022	618 (LV)	± 4.8%	41%	39%	21%
The Listener Group/The Political Matrix (R)	February 25 – March 8, 2022	432 (LV)	± 4.3%	47%	53%	–
The Listener Group/The Political Matrix (R)	October 8–28, 2021	532 (LV)	± 4.3%	42%	34%	24%

==== Results ====
Florida's 1st congressional district, 2022
Party	Candidate	Votes	%
Republican	Matt Gaetz (incumbent)	197,349	67.9
Democratic	Rebekah Jones	93,467	32.1
Total votes		290,816	100.0
Republican hold			

== District 2 ==
2022 Florida's 2nd congressional district election
- November 8, 2022
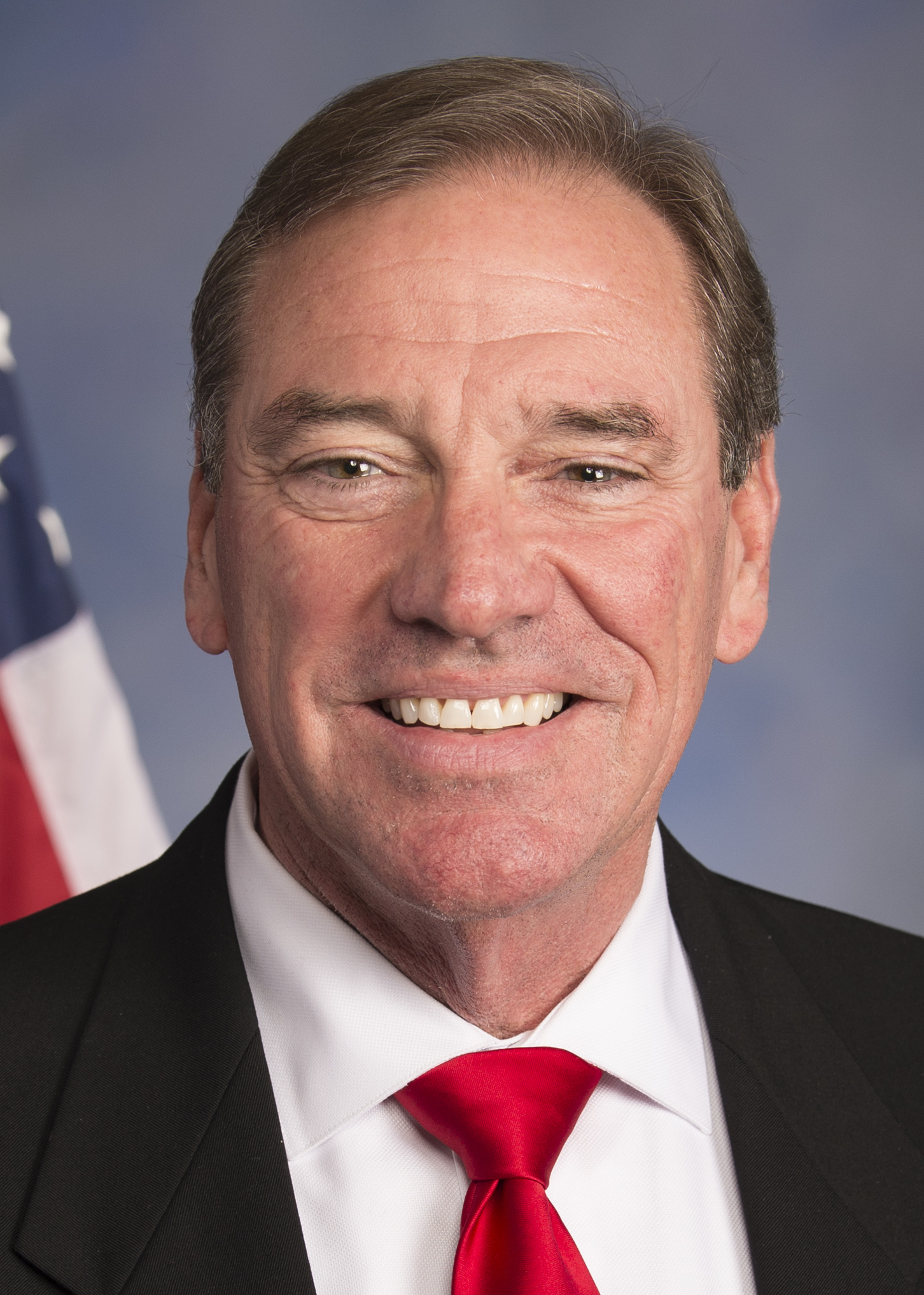

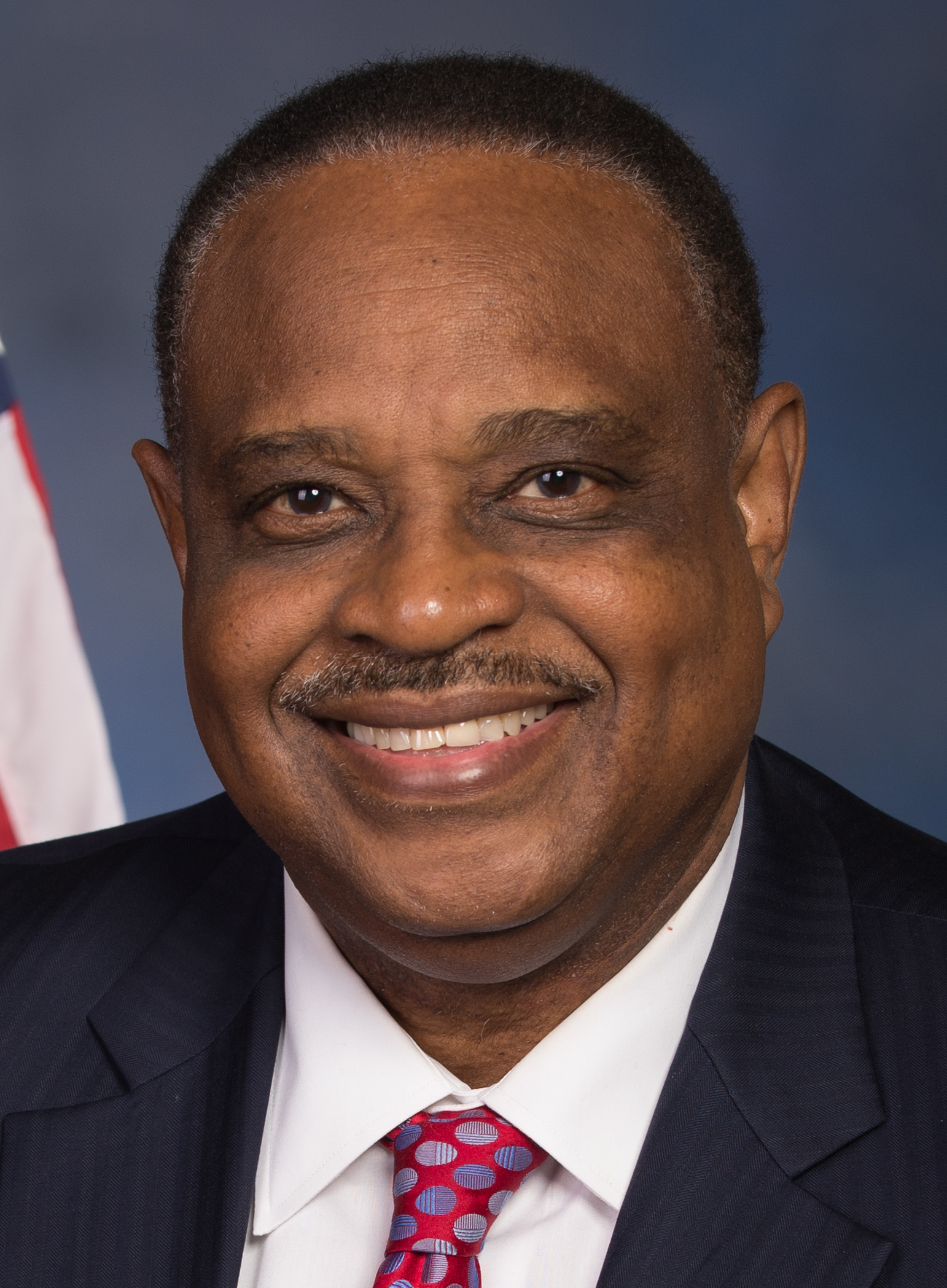
Nominee	Neal Dunn	Al Lawson
Party	Republican	Democratic
Popular vote	180,236	121,153
Percentage	59.8%	40.2%
- Dunn: 50–60% 60–70% 70–80% 80–90% >90% Lawson: 50–60% 60–70% 70–80% 80–90% >90%
U.S. Representative before election
Neal Dunn (Republican)
Al Lawson (Democratic)
Elected U.S. Representative
Neal Dunn
Republican

Republican Neal Dunn, who had represented the district since 2017, was re-elected with 97% of the vote in 2020. Dunn won re-election in 2022.

The boundaries of the district were redrawn from 2020, determined by the 2020 redistricting cycle.

=== Republican primary ===
==== Candidates ====
===== Nominee =====
- Neal Dunn, incumbent U.S. representative

=== Democratic primary ===
==== Candidates ====
===== Nominee =====
- Al Lawson, incumbent U.S. representative

===== Withdrawn =====
- Karen Stripling, Southern Poverty Law Center activist

==== Endorsements ====
Al Lawson

Organizations

- Planned Parenthood Action Fund
- Sierra Club

Labor unions

- 1199SEIU United Healthcare Workers East
- AFSCME Florida
- Service Employees International Union Florida

=== General election ===
==== Forum ====
2022 Florida's 2nd congressional district candidate forum
No.	Date	Host	Moderator	Link	Republican	Democratic
Key: P Participant A Absent N Not invited I Invited W Withdrawn						
Key: P Participant A Absent N Not invited I Invited W Withdrawn					Neal Dunn	Al Lawson
1	Oct. 18, 2022	The Tallahassee Democrat; WFSU-TV	James Call; Tom Flanigan		A	P

==== Predictions ====
Source	Ranking	As of
The Cook Political Report	Solid R	April 25, 2022
Inside Elections	Solid R	May 17, 2022
Sabato's Crystal Ball	Safe R	April 27, 2022
Politico	Likely R	April 28, 2022
RCP	Safe R	June 9, 2022
Fox News	Solid R	July 11, 2022
DDHQ	Solid R	July 20, 2022
538	Solid R	June 30, 2022
The Economist	Safe R	September 28, 2022

==== Polling ====
Poll source	Date(s) administered	Sample size (Note: Key: A – all adults RV – registered voters LV – likely voters V – unclear)	Margin of error	Al Lawson (D)	Neal Dunn (R)	Undecided
David Binder Research (D) (Note: Poll sponsored by the Southern Roots PAC, which supports Lawson)	September 14–18, 2022	600 (LV)	± 4.0%	43%	49%	8%
Sachs Media Group	June 20–23, 2022	400 (LV)	± 4.9%	40%	43%	17%

==== Results ====
Florida's 2nd congressional district, 2022
Party	Candidate	Votes	%
Republican	Neal Dunn (incumbent)	180,236	59.8
Democratic	Al Lawson (incumbent)	121,153	40.2
Total votes		301,389	100.0
Republican hold			

== District 3 ==
2022 Florida's 3rd congressional district election
- November 8, 2022
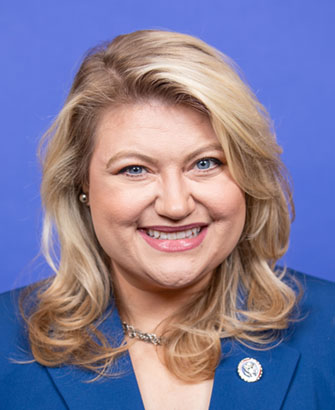

Nominee	Kat Cammack	Danielle Hawk
Party	Republican	Democratic
Popular vote	178,101	103,382
Percentage	62.52%	36.29%
- Cammack: 40–50% 50–60% 60–70% 70–80% 80–90% >90% Hawk: 40–50% 50–60% 60–70% 70–80% 80–90% >90% No votes
U.S. Representative before election
Kat Cammack
Republican
Elected U.S. Representative
Kat Cammack
Republican

Republican Kat Cammack, who had represented the district since 2021, was elected with 57% of the vote in 2020. Cammack won re-election in 2022.

The boundaries of the district were redrawn from 2020, determined by the 2020 redistricting cycle.

=== Republican primary ===
Republican primary county results: Map legend: Cammack—>90%; Cammack—80–90%; Cammack—70–80%

==== Nominee ====
- Kat Cammack, incumbent U.S. representative

==== Eliminated in primary ====
- Justin Waters, lawyer

==== Withdrawn ====
- Manuel Asensio, businessman

==== Endorsements ====
Kat Cammack

Executive branch officials

- Donald Trump, 45th president of the United States (2017–2021)

Organizations

- Maggie's List
- Tea Party Express
- Turning Point Action

==== Results ====
Republican primary results
Party	Candidate	Votes	%
Republican	Kat Cammack (incumbent)	63,279	85.2
Republican	Justin Waters	11,022	14.8
Total votes		74,301	100.0

=== Democratic primary ===
Democratic primary county results: Map legend: Hawk—70–80%; Hawk—60–70%; Hawk—50–60%; Wells—50–60%

==== Candidates ====
===== Nominee =====
- Danielle Hawk, customer service representative

===== Eliminated in primary =====
- Tom Wells, physicist and candidate for this seat in 2018 and 2020

=== Endorsements ===
Danielle Hawk

Organizations

- Everytown for Gun Safety Action Fund

==== Results ====
Democratic primary results
Party	Candidate	Votes	%
Democratic	Danielle Hawk	37,181	67.6
Democratic	Tom Wells	17,799	32.4
Total votes		54,980	100.0

=== Independents ===
- Linda Brooks, historian

=== General election ===
==== Debate ====
2022 Florida's 3rd congressional district debate
No.	Date	Host	Moderator	Link	Republican	Democratic
Key: P Participant A Absent N Not invited I Invited W Withdrawn						
Key: P Participant A Absent N Not invited I Invited W Withdrawn					Kat Cammack	Danielle Hawk
1	Oct. 18, 2022	WESH	Greg Fox		P	P

==== Predictions ====
Source	Ranking	As of
The Cook Political Report	Solid R	April 25, 2022
Inside Elections	Solid R	May 17, 2022
Sabato's Crystal Ball	Safe R	April 27, 2022
Politico	Solid R	April 28, 2022
RCP	Safe R	June 9, 2022
Fox News	Solid R	July 11, 2022
DDHQ	Solid R	July 20, 2022
538	Solid R	June 30, 2022
The Economist	Safe R	September 28, 2022

==== Results ====
Florida's 3rd congressional district, 2022
Party	Candidate	Votes	%
Republican	Kat Cammack (incumbent)	178,101	62.5
Democratic	Danielle Hawk	103,382	36.3
Independent	Linda Brooks	3,410	1.2
Total votes		284,893	100.0
Republican hold			

== District 4 ==
2022 Florida's 4th congressional district election
- November 8, 2022
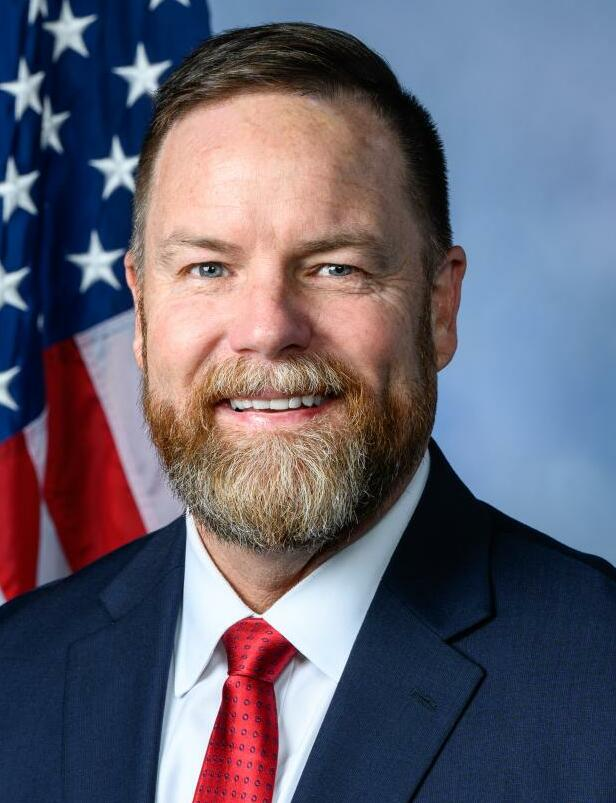

Nominee	Aaron Bean	LaShonda Holloway
Party	Republican	Democratic
Popular vote	165,696	108,402
Percentage	60.45%	39.55%
- Bean: 50–60% 60–70% 70–80% 80–90% >90% Halloway: 50–60% 60–70% 70–80% 80–90% >90%
U.S. Representative before election
None (new seat)
Elected U.S. Representative
Aaron Bean
Republican

The boundaries of the district were redrawn from 2020, determined by the 2020 redistricting cycle.

The 4th district (formerly the 5th) was drawn to be much more conservative than on the previous map, losing Tallahassee and some competitive parts of Duval county and gaining the counties of Nassau and Clay. As a result, the east-to-west layout connecting Tallahassee to Jacksonville was removed entirely.

=== Democratic primary ===
==== Candidates ====
===== Nominee =====
- LaShonda Holloway, former congressional aide and candidate for Florida's 5th congressional district in 2016 and 2020

===== Eliminated in primary =====
- Tony Hill, former state senator (2002–2011)

===== Declined =====
- Audrey Gibson, state senator (2011–present) and former minority leader of the Florida Senate (2018–2020) (running for mayor of Jacksonville)

==== Endorsements ====
Tony Hill

Labor unions

- AFSCME Florida

==== Results ====
Democratic primary county results Map legend: Holloway—50–60%; Hill—50–60%

Democratic primary results
Party	Candidate	Votes	%
Democratic	LaShonda Holloway	29,352	50.2
Democratic	Tony Hill	29,145	49.8
Total votes		58,455	100.0

=== Republican primary ===
==== Candidates ====
===== Nominee =====
- Aaron Bean, president pro tempore of the Florida Senate

===== Eliminated in primary =====
- Erick Aguilar, U.S. Navy (retired), professor and candidate for FL-04 in 2020
- Jon Chuba, insurance analyst

===== Withdrawn =====
- Jason Fischer, member of the Florida House of Representatives (running for Duval County property appraiser)

===== Declined =====
- Lenny Curry, mayor of Jacksonville (endorsed Bean)
- Rory Diamond, member of the Jacksonville City Council (endorsed Bean)

==== Endorsements ====
Erick Aguilar

Cabinet officials

- Ryan Zinke, former United States Secretary of the Interior (2017–2019), U.S. representative from Montana (2015–2017) and Republican nominee for Montana's 1st congressional district in 2022

Organizations

- Disabled Veterans PAC
- Seal PAC
- Stand for Health Freedom
Aaron Bean

U.S. senators

- Marco Rubio, U.S. senator from Florida (2011–)

U.S. representatives

- Ander Crenshaw, former U.S. representative for Florida's 4th congressional district (2001–2017)

State officials

- Ashley Moody, Florida attorney general
- Jimmy Patronis, chief financial officer of Florida

State legislators

- Jennifer Bradley, state senator
- Rob Bradley, former state senator (2012–2020)
- Travis Cummings, former state representative (2012–2020)
- Wyman Duggan, state representative
- Jay Fant, former state representative (2014–2018)
- Sam Garrison, state representative
- Jim Horne, former state senator (1995–2001), former Florida Commissioner of Education (2003–2004)
- Dick Kravitz, former state representative (2000–2008), former member of the Jacksonville City Council
- Bobby Payne, state representative
- Lake Ray, former state representative (2008–2016)
- Clay Yarborough, state representative

Sheriffs

- Michelle Cook, Clay County sheriff
- Pat Ivey, Jacksonville sheriff
- Bill Leeper, Nassau County sheriff
- Mike Williams, former Jacksonville sheriff

Local officials

- Greg Anderson, former member of the Jacksonville City Council
- Ken Bass, Callahan town council president
- Bradley Bean, Fernandina Beach city commissioner (candidate's son)
- John Beasley, Hilliard town councilman
- Aaron Bell, Nassau County commissioner
- Aaron Bowman, member of the Jacksonville City Council
- David Broskie, superintendent of the Clay County School District
- Elaine Brown, mayor of Neptune Beach
- Tony Brown, Keystone Heights city commissioner (Note: Article says Keystone, not Keystone Heights. Article also specifies that it is in Clay County. There is a Keystone in Florida, but it is in Hillsborough County.)
- Kristine Burke, Clay County commissioner
- Kathy Burns, superintendent of the Nassau County School District
- Matt Carlucci, member of the Jacksonville City Council
- Doyle Carter, former member of the Jacksonville City Council
- Mike Cella, Clay County commissioner
- Lenny Curry, mayor of Jacksonville (2015–)
- Randy DeFoor, member of the Jacksonville City Council
- Rory Diamond, member of the Jacksonville City Council
- Thomas Ford, Nassau County commissioner
- Terrence Freeman, president of the Jacksonville City Council
- Ed Gaw, Green Cove Springs city councilman
- Ellen Glasser, mayor of Atlantic Beach
- Shirley Graham, former mayor of Callahan
- Jim Hauber, Orange Park city councilman
- Gayward Hendry, former Clay County commissioner
- Jimmy Higginbotham, former Nassau County commissioner
- Alberta Hipps, former member of the Jacksonville City Council
- Chris Hoffman, mayor of Jacksonville Beach
- Nick Howland, member of the Jacksonville City Council
- Len Kreger, vice mayor of Fernandina Beach
- Jim Love, former member of the Jacksonville City Council
- Sean Lynch, mayor of Baldwin
- John Martin, Nassau County commissioner
- Sam Newby, member of the Jacksonville City Council
- J.B. Renninger, Clay County commissioner
- John Ruis, former superintendent of the Nassau County School District
- Ron Salem, vice president of the Jacksonville City Council
- Matt Schellenberg, former member of the Jacksonville City Council
- Thomas Smith, Green Cove Springs city councilman
- Ginger Soud, former member of the Jacksonville City Council
- George Spicer, former Nassau County commissioner
- David Sturges, Fernandina Beach city commissioner
- Justin Taylor, former Nassau County commissioner
- Randy White, member of the Jacksonville City Council
- Scott Wilson, former member of the Jacksonville City Council

Individuals

- Jennifer Carroll, former lieutenant governor of Florida (2011–2013)
- John Delaney, former mayor of Jacksonville (1995–2003)
- John Peyton, former mayor of Jacksonville (2003–2011)
- John E. Thrasher, former speaker of the Florida House of Representatives (1998–2000)

Organizations

- Tea Party Express
Jason Fischer (withdrawn)

Individuals

- Grover Norquist, president of Americans for Tax Reform

==== Polling ====
Poll source	Date(s) administered	Sample size	Margin of error	Erick Aguilar	Aaron Bean	Jon Chuba	Undecided
St. Pete Polls	August 4, 2022	312 (LV)	± 5.5%	16%	59%	6%	19%
The Tyson Group (R) (Note: This poll was sponsored by the Republican Party of Florida in order to determine debate eligibility.)	July 5–7, 2022	400 (LV)	± 4.9%	14%	24%	3%	59%

==== Results ====
Republican primary county results Map legend: Bean—70–80%; Bean—60–70%

Republican primary results
Party	Candidate	Votes	%
Republican	Aaron Bean	49,060	68.1
Republican	Erick Aguilar	18,605	25.8
Republican	Jon Chuba	4,388	6.1
Total votes		72,053	100.0

=== Independents ===
- Gary Lee Konitz, investigative journalist (write-in candidate)

=== General election ===
==== Predictions ====
Source	Ranking	As of
The Cook Political Report	Solid R (flip)	April 25, 2022
Inside Elections	Solid R (flip)	May 17, 2022
Sabato's Crystal Ball	Safe R (flip)	July 28, 2022
Politico	Likely R (flip)	April 28, 2022
RCP	Likely R (flip)	September 29, 2022
Fox News	Solid R (flip)	July 11, 2022
DDHQ	Solid R (flip)	July 20, 2022
538	Solid R (flip)	June 30, 2022
The Economist	Safe R (flip)	September 28, 2022

==== Polling ====
Poll source	Date(s) administered	Sample size	Margin of error	LaShonda Holloway (D)	Aaron Bean (R)	Undecided
University of North Florida	October 20–27, 2022	413 (LV)	± 5.4%	38%	50%	12%

==== Results ====
Florida's 4th congressional district, 2022
Party	Candidate	Votes	%
Republican	Aaron Bean	165,696	60.5
Democratic	LaShonda Holloway	108,402	39.5
Independent	Gary Koniz (write-in)	5	0.0
Total votes		274,103	100.0
Republican win (new seat)			

== District 5 ==
2022 Florida's 5th congressional district election
- November 8, 2022
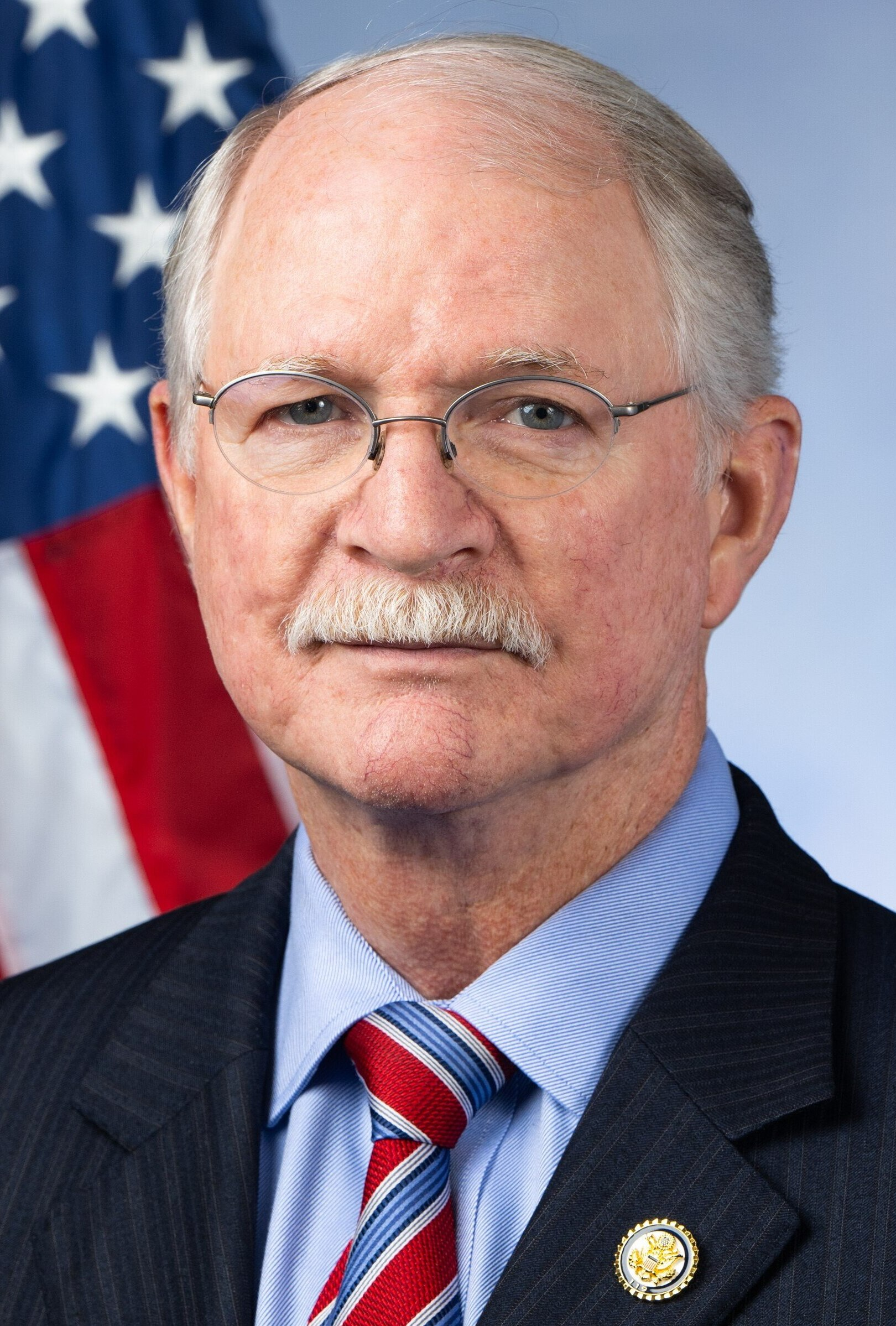
Nominee	John Rutherford (Uncontested)
Party	Republican
U.S. Representative before election
John Rutherford
Republican
Elected U.S. Representative
John Rutherford
Republican

Republican John Rutherford, who had represented the 5th district since 2017 (or 4th depending on numbering), was re-elected with 61% of the vote in 2020. Rutherford won re-election unopposed in 2022.

The boundaries of the district were redrawn from 2020, determined by the 2020 redistricting cycle.

=== Republican primary ===
==== Candidates ====
===== Nominee =====
- John Rutherford, incumbent U.S. representative

===== Eliminated in primary =====
- Leigha "Luna" Garner-Lopez, psychologist
- Mara Macie, stay-at-home mom

==== Results ====
Republican primary county results Map legend: Rutherford—60–70%

Republican primary results
Party	Candidate	Votes	%
Republican	John Rutherford (incumbent)	87,720	65.7
Republican	Mara Macie	23,607	17.7
Republican	Luna Lopez	22,283	16.7
Total votes		133,610	100.0

=== Democratic primary ===
==== Candidates ====
No Democratic candidates filed to run.

=== General election ===
==== Predictions ====
Source	Ranking	As of
The Cook Political Report	Solid R	April 25, 2022
Inside Elections	Solid R	May 17, 2022
Sabato's Crystal Ball	Safe R	April 27, 2022
Politico	Solid R	April 28, 2022
RCP	Safe R	June 9, 2022
Fox News	Solid R	July 11, 2022
DDHQ	Solid R	July 20, 2022
538	Solid R	June 30, 2022
The Economist	Safe R	September 28, 2022

==== Results ====
Florida's 5th congressional district, 2022
Party	Candidate	Votes	%
Republican	John Rutherford (incumbent)	Unopposed	
Total votes		N/A	100.0
Republican hold			

== District 6 ==
2022 Florida's 6th congressional district election
- November 8, 2022
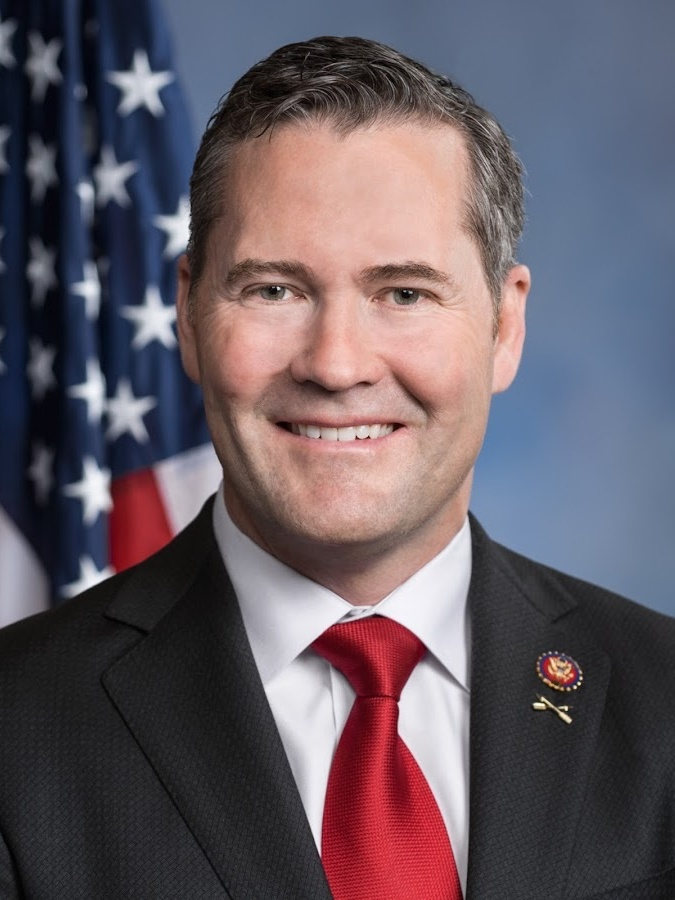

Nominee	Mike Waltz	Joe Hannoush
Party	Republican	Libertarian
Popular vote	226,548	74,207
Percentage	75.33%	24.67%
- Waltz: 50–60% 60–70% 70–80% 80–90% >90% Hannoush: 50–60% 60–70% 70–80%
U.S. Representative before election
Michael Waltz
Republican
Elected U.S. Representative
Michael Waltz
Republican

Republican Michael Waltz, who had represented the district since 2019, was elected with 60% of the vote in 2020. Waltz won re-election in 2022.

The boundaries of the district were redrawn from 2020, determined by the 2020 redistricting cycle. The 6th district was changed to lose half of Volusia County, while also taking in Putnam County and the eastern portion of Marion County. However, despite experiencing massive changes to his district, and therefore his electorate, Waltz did not face any major primary threats in this election.

=== Republican primary ===
Republican primary county results Map legend: Waltz—80–90%; Waltz—70–80%; Waltz—60–70%

==== Candidates ====
===== Nominee =====
- Michael Waltz, incumbent U.S. representative

===== Eliminated in primary =====
- Charles Davis, mortgage banker

===== Endorsements =====
Michael Waltz

Executive branch officials

- Nikki Haley, former U.S. Ambassador to the United Nations (2017–2018) and former governor of South Carolina (2011–2017)
- Donald Trump, 45th president of the United States (2017–2021)

Individuals

- Peter Thiel, entrepreneur and venture capitalist

Organizations

- Pro-Israel America

==== Results ====
Republican primary results
Party	Candidate	Votes	%
Republican	Michael Waltz (incumbent)	65,694	77.4
Republican	Charles Davis	19,175	22.6
Total votes		84,869	100.0

=== Democratic primary ===
==== Candidates ====
===== Withdrawn =====
- Richard Thripp, former chair of the Volusia County Democratic Party and candidate for this district in 2020

===== Declined =====
- Gary Conroy, vice mayor of Edgewater

=== Independent and third-party candidates ===
==== Libertarian Party ====
===== Nominee =====
- Joe Hannoush, information systems technician

=== General election ===
==== Predictions ====
Source	Ranking	As of
The Cook Political Report	Solid R	April 25, 2022
Inside Elections	Solid R	May 17, 2022
Sabato's Crystal Ball	Safe R	April 27, 2022
Politico	Solid R	April 28, 2022
RCP	Safe R	June 9, 2022
Fox News	Solid R	July 11, 2022
DDHQ	Solid R	July 20, 2022
538	Solid R	June 30, 2022
The Economist	Safe R	September 28, 2022

==== Results ====
Florida's 6th congressional district, 2022
Party	Candidate	Votes	%
Republican	Michael Waltz (incumbent)	226,548	75.3
Libertarian	Joe Hannoush	74,207	24.7
Total votes		300,755	100.0
Republican hold			

== District 7 ==
2022 Florida's 7th congressional district election
- November 8, 2022
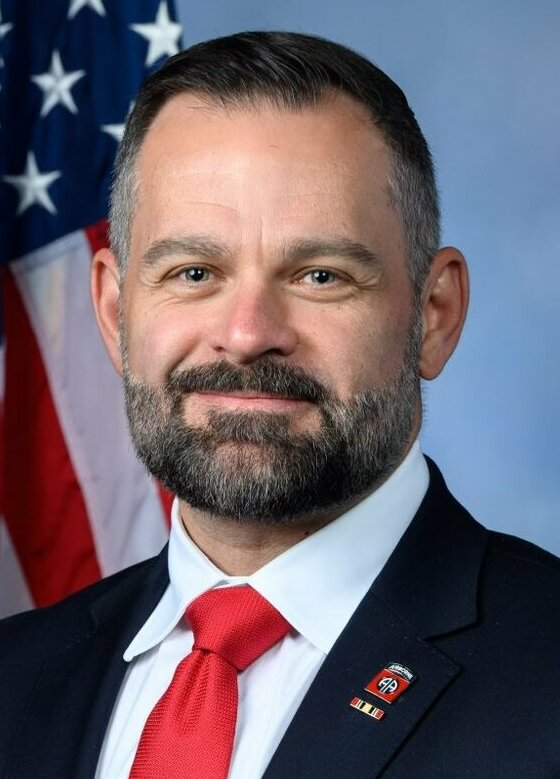

Nominee	Cory Mills	Karen Green
Party	Republican	Democratic
Popular vote	177,966	126,079
Percentage	58.53%	41.47%
- Mills: 50–60% 60–70% 70–80% 80–90% Green: 50–60% 60–70% 70–80%
U.S. Representative before election
Stephanie Murphy
Democratic
Elected U.S. Representative
Cory Mills
Republican

Democrat Stephanie Murphy, who had represented the district since 2017, was re-elected with 55% of the vote in 2020. Murphy initially stated she would run for re-election, but on December 20, 2021, she announced she would not run.

The boundaries of the district were redrawn from 2020, determined by the 2020 redistricting cycle. The 7th district was drawn to be much more conservative than on the previous map, simply by pairing Seminole County with Volusia instead of Orange.

This district was included on the list of Democratic-held seats the National Republican Congressional Committee was targeting in 2022.

=== Democratic primary ===
==== Candidates ====
===== Nominee =====
- Karen Green, vice chair of the Florida Democratic Party

===== Eliminated in primary =====
- Tatiana Fernandez, businesswoman
- Al Krulick, perennial candidate
- Allen Pastrano, cyber engineer

===== Declined =====
- Emily Bonilla, Orange County commissioner
- Anna Eskamani, state representative (running for re-election) (endorsed Green)
- Chris King, financial executive and nominee for lieutenant governor in 2018
- Stephanie Murphy, incumbent U.S. representative and co-chair of the Blue Dog Coalition
- Carlos Guillermo Smith, state representative (endorsed Green)

==== Endorsements ====
Karen Green

State legislators

- Anna Eskamani, state representative
- Carlos Guillermo Smith, state representative
- Vic Torres, state senator

==== Results ====
Democratic primary county results Map legend: Green—40–50%

Democratic primary results
Party	Candidate	Votes	%
Democratic	Karen Green	23,051	44.9
Democratic	Al Krulick	10,787	21.0
Democratic	Tatiana Fernandez	10,261	20.0
Democratic	Allek Pastrana	7,289	14.2
Total votes		51,388	100.0

=== Republican primary ===
==== Candidates ====
===== Nominee =====
- Cory Mills, U.S. Army veteran and defense consultant

===== Eliminated in primary =====
- Erika Benfield, former DeBary city commissioner
- Brady Duke, pastor and former Navy SEAL
- Ted Edwards, former Orange County commissioner
- Rusty Roberts, former chief of staff for former U.S. Representative John Mica
- Anthony Sabatini, state representative
- Armando Santos, businessman
- Scott Sturgill, businessman

===== Withdrawn =====
- Kevin John "Mac" McGovern, retired U.S. Navy captain (running in the 15th district)
- Kristopher Stark, real estate agent

===== Declined =====
- Mark Busch, vice mayor of Casselberry and candidate for this district in 2016
- Lee Constantine, Seminole County Commissioner (District 3), former state senator and state representative

==== Endorsements ====
Brady Duke

U.S. representatives

- Dan Crenshaw, U.S. representative from Texas's 2nd congressional district (2019–present)
Cory Mills

U.S. senators

- Ted Cruz, U.S. senator from Texas (2013–present)

U.S. representatives

- Brian Babin, U.S. representative from Texas's 36th congressional district (2015–present)
- Jim Banks, U.S. representative from Indiana's 3rd congressional district (2017–present)
- Gus Bilirakis, U.S. representative from Florida's 12th congressional district (2013–present)
- Neal Dunn, U.S. representative from Florida's 2nd congressional district (2017–present)
- Mayra Flores, U.S. representative from Texas's 34th congressional district (2022–2023)
- Ronny Jackson, U.S. representative from Texas's 13th congressional district (2021–present)
- Jim Jordan, U.S. representative from Ohio's 7th congressional district (2007–present)
- Brian Mast, U.S. representative from Florida's 18th congressional district (2017–present)
- Markwayne Mullin, U.S. representative from Oklahoma's 2nd congressional district (2013–present)
- Troy Nehls, U.S. representative from Texas's 22nd congressional district (2021–present)
- John Rutherford, U.S. representative from Florida's 4th congressional district (2017–present)
- Pete Sessions, U.S. representative from Texas's 17th congressional district (2021–present)
- Greg Steube, U.S. representative from Florida's 17th congressional district (2019–present)
- Beth Van Duyne, U.S. representative from Texas's 24th congressional district (2021–present)

Organizations

- American Conservative Union
- Conservative Political Action Conference
- Veterans for America First
Rusty Roberts

U.S. representatives

- John Mica, former U.S. representative for this district (1993–2017)
- Joe Walsh, former U.S. representative from Illinois's 8th congressional district (2011–2013)

Labor unions

- Coastal Florida Police Benevolent Association
Anthony Sabatini

U.S. executive branch officials

- Michael Flynn, 24th United States National Security Advisor (2017)

U.S. senators

- Rand Paul, U.S. senator from Kentucky (2011–present)

U.S. representatives

- Andy Biggs, U.S. representative from Arizona's 5th congressional district (2016–present)
- Dan Bishop, U.S. representative from North Carolina's 9th congressional district (2019–present)
- Madison Cawthorn, U.S. representative from North Carolina's 11th congressional district (2021–present)
- Matt Gaetz, U.S. representative from Florida's 1st congressional district (2017–present)
- Louie Gohmert, U.S. representative from Texas's 1st congressional district (2005–present)
- Paul Gosar, U.S. representative from Arizona's 4th congressional district (2011–present)
- Marjorie Taylor Greene, U.S. representative from Georgia's 14th congressional district (2021–present)
- Thomas Massie, U.S. representative from Kentucky's 4th congressional district (2012–present)
- Ron Paul, former U.S. representative for Texas's 22nd congressional district (1976–1977, 1979–1985) and Texas's 14th congressional district (1997–2013)

Individuals

- Roger Stone, conservative political consultant

Organizations

- FreedomWorks
- Gun Owners of America
- Republican Liberty Caucus
- Republican National Hispanic Assembly
- Stand for Health Freedom

==== Polling ====
Poll source	Date(s) administered	Sample size	Margin of error	Erika Benfield	Brady Duke	Ted Edwards	Cory Mills	Rusty Roberts	Anthony Sabatini	Armando Santos	Scott Sturgill	Undecided
St. Pete Polls	August 17, 2022	277 (LV)	± 5.9%	5%	16%	5%	24%	7%	22%	2%	3%	16%
St. Pete Polls	August 5, 2022	205 (LV)	± 6.8%	5%	12%	5%	23%	9%	22%	3%	3%	18%
RMG Research	July 6–13, 2022	300 (LV)	± 5.7%	2%	9%	1%	16%	0%	23%	–	5%	42%
Kurt Jetta (R) (Note: This poll was sponsored by Center Street PAC, which supports Rusty Roberts.)	March 4 – July 9, 2022	311 (RV)	± 5.6%	3%	3%	–	17%	9%	7%	5%	4%	51%
The Tyson Group (R)	July 5–7, 2022	400 (LV)	± 4.9%	2%	8%	1%	23%	1%	21%	1%	3%	40%
St. Pete Polls	March 28, 2022	285 (LV)	± 5.8%	6%	8%	–	13%	8%	12%	–	–	53%

Hypothetical polling

Poll source	Date(s) administered	Sample size	Margin of error	Erika Benfield	Lee Constantine	Brady Duke	Cory Mills	Rusty Roberts	Anthony Sabatini	Undecided
St. Pete Polls	March 28, 2022	285 (LV)	± 5.8%	7%	23%	4%	12%	5%	9%	39%

==== Debate ====
2022 Florida's 7th congressional district Republican primary debate
No.	Date	Host	Moderator	Link	Republican	Republican	Republican	Republican	Republican	Republican	Republican	Republican
Key: P Participant A Absent N Not invited I Invited W Withdrawn												
Key: P Participant A Absent N Not invited I Invited W Withdrawn					Erika Benfield	Brady Duke	Ted Edwards	Cory Mills	Rusty Roberts	Anthony Sabatini	Armando Santos	Scott Sturgill
1		WESH	Greg Fox		P	P	P	P	P	P	P	P

==== Results ====
Republican primary county results Map legend: Mills—40–50%; Mills—<30%

Republican primary results
Party	Candidate	Votes	%
Republican	Cory Mills	27,757	37.9
Republican	Anthony Sabatini	17,332	23.7
Republican	Brady Duke	11,221	15.3
Republican	Ted Edwards	4,259	5.8
Republican	Rusty Roberts	4,031	5.5
Republican	Erika Benfield	3,964	5.4
Republican	Scott Sturgill	3,094	4.2
Republican	Armando Santos	1,504	2.1
Total votes		73,162	100.0

=== General election ===
==== Predictions ====
Source	Ranking	As of
The Cook Political Report	Solid R (flip)	October 5, 2022
Inside Elections	Likely R (flip)	May 17, 2022
Sabato's Crystal Ball	Safe R (flip)	July 28, 2022
Politico	Likely R (flip)	October 18, 2022
RCP	Likely R (flip)	June 9, 2022
Fox News	Solid R (flip)	July 11, 2022
DDHQ	Solid R (flip)	July 20, 2022
538	Solid R (flip)	June 30, 2022
The Economist	Safe R (flip)	September 28, 2022

==== Results ====
Florida's 7th congressional district, 2022
Party	Candidate	Votes	%
Republican	Cory Mills	177,966	58.5
Democratic	Karen Green	126,079	41.5
Independent	Cardon Pompey (write-in)	10	0.0
Total votes		304,055	100.0
Republican gain from Democratic			

== District 8 ==
2022 Florida's 8th congressional district election
- November 8, 2022
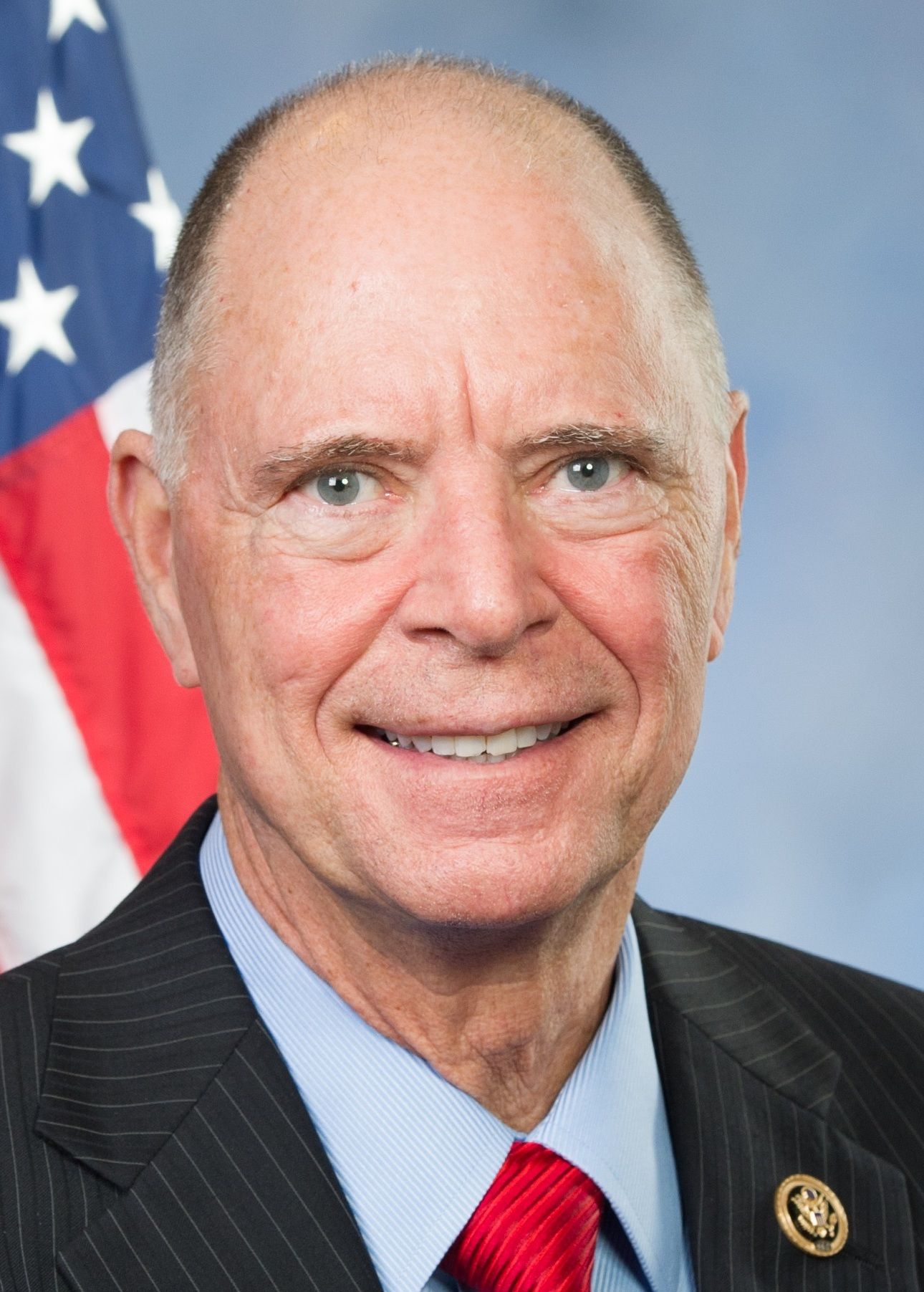

Nominee	Bill Posey	Joanne Terry
Party	Republican	Democratic
Popular vote	222,128	120,080
Percentage	64.91%	35.09%
- Posey: 50–60% 60–70% 70–80% 80–90% >90% Terry: 50–60% 60–70% 70–80%
U.S. Representative before election
Bill Posey
Republican
Elected U.S. Representative
Bill Posey
Republican

Republican Bill Posey, who had represented the district since 2009, was re-elected with 61% of the vote in 2020. Posey won re-election in 2022.

The boundaries of the district were redrawn from 2020, determined by the 2020 redistricting cycle.

=== Republican primary ===
==== Candidates ====
===== Nominee =====
- Bill Posey, incumbent U.S. representative

==== Endorsements ====
Bill Posey

Federal officials

- Mike Pompeo, former U.S. Secretary of State (2018–2021)

=== Democratic primary ===
==== Candidates ====
===== Nominee =====
- Joanne Terry, former satellite systems engineer

===== Eliminated in primary =====
- Danelle Dodge, technology consultant and activist

==== Results ====
Democratic primary county results Map legend: Terry—50–60%

Democratic primary results
Party	Candidate	Votes	%
Democratic	Joanne Terry	29,542	54.6
Democratic	Danielle Dodge	24,592	45.4
Total votes		54,134	100.0

=== General election ===
==== Predictions ====
Source	Ranking	As of
The Cook Political Report	Solid R	April 25, 2022
Inside Elections	Solid R	May 17, 2022
Sabato's Crystal Ball	Safe R	April 27, 2022
Politico	Solid R	April 28, 2022
RCP	Safe R	June 9, 2022
Fox News	Solid R	July 11, 2022
DDHQ	Solid R	July 20, 2022
538	Solid R	June 30, 2022
The Economist	Safe R	September 28, 2022

==== Results ====
Florida's 8th congressional district, 2022
Party	Candidate	Votes	%
Republican	Bill Posey (incumbent)	222,128	64.9
Democratic	Joanne Terry	120,080	35.1
Total votes		342,208	100.0
Republican hold			

== District 9 ==
2022 Florida's 9th congressional district election
- November 8, 2022
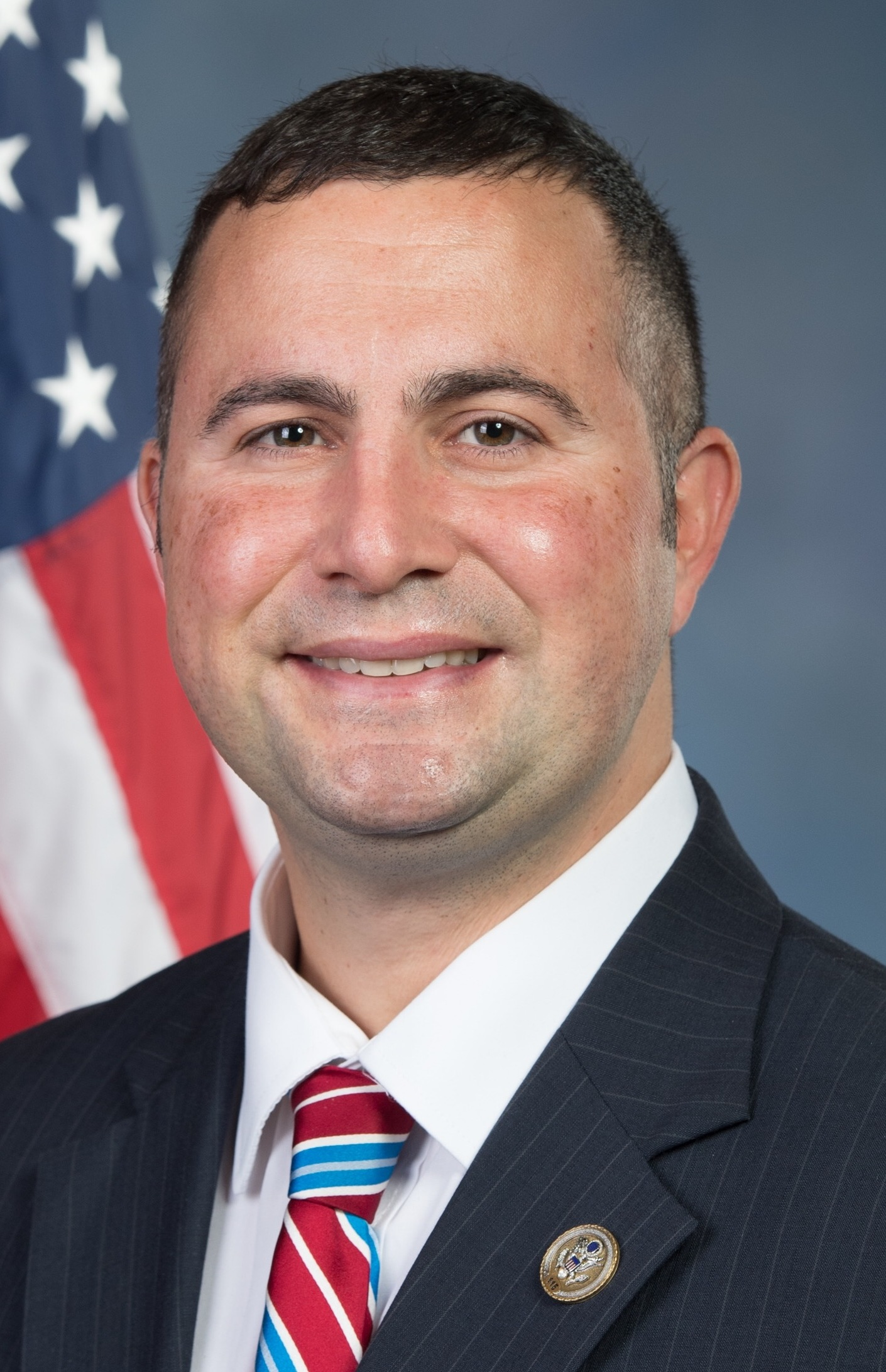

Nominee	Darren Soto	Scotty Moore
Party	Democratic	Republican
Popular vote	108,541	93,827
Percentage	53.64%	46.36%
- Soto: 50–60% 60–70% 70–80% Moore: 50–60% 60–70% 70–80% 80–90% No data
U.S. Representative before election
Darren Soto
Democratic
Elected U.S. Representative
Darren Soto
Democratic

Democrat Darren Soto, who had represented the district since 2017, was re-elected with 56.02% of the vote in 2020. Soto won re-election in 2022. Despite winning, however, his margin of victory was only around 7 percentage-points in a Biden+18 district, coinciding with the continuous erosion of support for the Democratic Party among Hispanic voters.

The boundaries of the district were redrawn from 2020, determined by the 2020 redistricting cycle. The 9th district lost most of the portion of Polk County it had in the 2016 map, mostly due to the massive growth of the Puerto Rican population in Orange County and Osceola County.

=== Democratic primary ===
==== Candidates ====
===== Nominee =====
- Darren Soto, incumbent U.S. representative

==== Endorsements ====
Darren Soto

Organizations

- Emgage
- Feminist Majority PAC
- League of Conservation Voters
- Planned Parenthood Action Fund
- Sierra Club

Labor unions

- AFSCME Florida
- Service Employees International Union Florida

=== Republican primary ===
Republican primary county results Map legend: Moore—50–60%; Moore—40–50%

==== Candidates ====
===== Nominee =====
- Scotty Moore, life coach and Christian missionary

===== Eliminated in primary =====
- Jose Castillo, businessman and candidate for this district in 2020
- Adianis Morales, pastor and organizer
- Sergio Ortiz, mortgage banker and candidate for this district in 2020

===== Withdrawn =====
- Bill Olson, former U.S. Army sergeant and nominee for this district in 2020 (running for state representative) (endorsed Castillo)

==== Endorsements ====
Scotty Moore

Executive branch officials

- Mark Meadows, former White House Chief of Staff (2020–2021), former U.S. representative from North Carolina's 11th congressional district (2013–2020)

U.S. senators

- Ted Cruz, U.S. senator from Texas (2013–present)

Organizations

- Family Research Council Action PAC

==== Results ====
Republican primary results
Party	Candidate	Votes	%
Republican	Scotty Moore	16,971	55.9
Republican	Jose Castillo	7,537	24.8
Republican	Adianis Morales	3,969	13.1
Republican	Sergio Oritz	1,900	6.3
Total votes		30,357	100.0

=== General election ===
==== Predictions ====
Source	Ranking	As of
The Cook Political Report	Solid D	April 25, 2022
Inside Elections	Solid D	May 17, 2022
Sabato's Crystal Ball	Safe D	April 27, 2022
Politico	Likely D	October 18, 2022
RCP	Likely D	June 9, 2022
Fox News	Solid D	October 11, 2022
DDHQ	Solid D	July 20, 2022
538	Solid D	June 30, 2022
The Economist	Likely D	November 1, 2022

==== Results ====
Florida's 9th congressional district, 2022
Party	Candidate	Votes	%
Democratic	Darren Soto (incumbent)	108,541	53.6
Republican	Scotty Moore	93,827	46.4
Total votes		202,368	100.0
Democratic hold			

== District 10 ==
2022 Florida's 10th congressional district election
- November 8, 2022
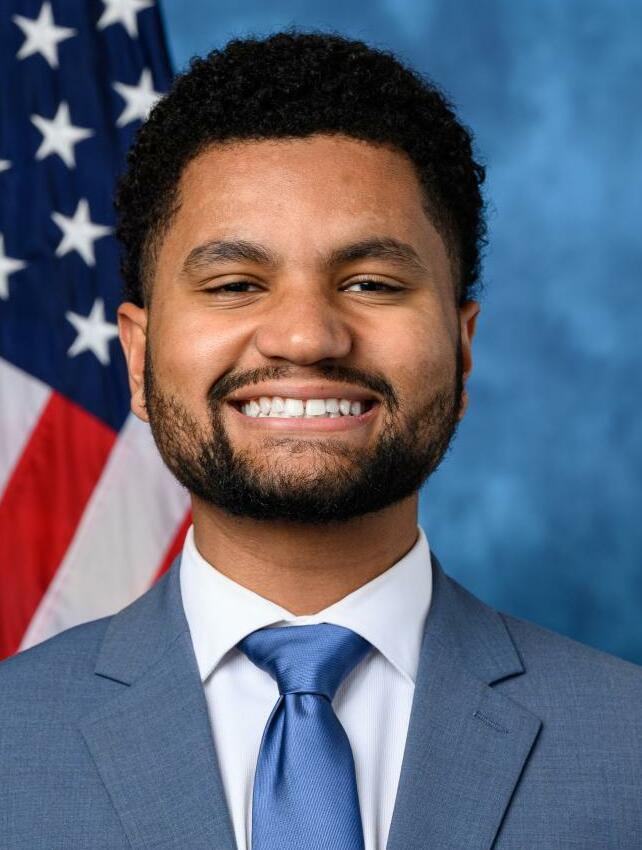

Nominee	Maxwell Frost	Calvin Wimbish
Party	Democratic	Republican
Popular vote	117,955	78,844
Percentage	59.00%	39.44%
- Precinct results Frost: 40–50% 50–60% 60–70% 70–80% 80–90% >90% Wimbish: 40–50% 50–60% 60–70% >90%
U.S. Representative before election
Val Demings
Democratic
Elected U.S. Representative
Maxwell Alejandro Frost
Democratic

Democrat Val Demings, who had represented the district since 2017, was re-elected with 63% of the vote in 2020. Demings did not run for re-election and instead ran unsuccessfully for the 2022 United States Senate election in Florida.

The boundaries of the district were redrawn from 2020, determined by the 2020 redistricting cycle.

=== Democratic primary ===
==== Candidates ====
===== Nominee =====
- Maxwell Alejandro Frost, former national organizing director of March for Our Lives

===== Eliminated in primary =====
- Jack Joseph Achenbach, dietician and personal chef
- Jeffrey Boone, financial executive and bitcoin investor
- Randolph Bracy, state senator from the 11th district (2016–present)
- Corrine Brown, former U.S. representative for Florida's 5th congressional district (2013–2017) and 3rd district (1993–2013) and convicted felon
- Terence Gray, pastor
- Alan Grayson, former U.S. representative from Florida's 9th congressional district (2013–2017) and 8th district (2009–2011), candidate for U.S. Senate in 2016 and 2022
- Natalie Jackson, lawyer
- Khalid Muneer, former banker, real estate broker and civic activist
- Teresa Tachon, public school teacher

===== Withdrew =====
- Aramis Ayala, state attorney for the Ninth Judicial Circuit Court of Florida (2017–2021) (running for attorney general)

===== Declined =====
- Val Demings, incumbent U.S. representative (running for U.S. Senate)

===== Endorsements =====
Aramis Ayala (withdrawn)

Governors

- Howard Dean, 79th governor of Vermont (1993–2001) and chair of the Democratic National Committee (2005–2009)

Individuals

- Shaquille O'Neal, former NBA player and sports analyst

Organizations

- ~~Democracy for America~~ (switched endorsement to Frost after Ayala withdrew)
Randolph Bracy

Organizations

- Democratic Majority for Israel
Maxwell Alejandro Frost

U.S. senators

- Ed Markey, U.S. senator from Massachusetts (2013–present)
- Bernie Sanders, U.S. senator from Vermont (2007–present)
- Elizabeth Warren, U.S. senator from Massachusetts (2013–present)

U.S. representatives

- Katherine Clark, U.S. representative for Massachusetts's 5th congressional district (2013–)
- Val Demings, U.S. representative for this district (2017–2023) (post-primary)
- Pramila Jayapal, U.S. representative for Washington's 7th congressional district (2017–present)
- Mondaire Jones, U.S. representative from New York's 17th congressional district (2021–2023)
- Ro Khanna, U.S. representative from California's 17th congressional district (2017–present)
- Ayanna Pressley, U.S. representative from Massachusetts's 7th congressional district (2019–)
- Jamie Raskin, U.S. representative from Maryland's 8th congressional district (2017–present)
- Darren Soto, U.S. representative for Florida's 9th congressional district (2017–) (post-primary)
- Ritchie Torres, U.S. representative from New York's 15th congressional district (2021–present)

State legislators

- Anna Eskamani, state representative
- Carlos Guillermo Smith, state representative
- Vic Torres, state senator

Local officials

- Jerry Demings, mayor of Orange County (post-primary)
- Buddy Dyer, mayor of Orlando (post-primary)
- Amy Mercado, Orange County property appraiser and former state representative

Individuals

- Fred Guttenberg, gun-control activist
- Dolores Huerta, civil rights activist
- Jesse Jackson, minister and former shadow U.S. Senator from Washington D.C. (1991–1997)
- Ben Jealous, president of People for the American Way

Organizations

- Brady: United Against Gun Violence
- Brand New Congress
- Communication Workers of America
- Community Justice Action Fund
- Congressional Hispanic Caucus
- Congressional Progressive Caucus
- Democracy for America (previously endorsed Ayala)
- Friends of the Earth Action
- Future Generation PAC
- Latino Victory Fund
- League of Conservation Voters
- Newtown Action Alliance
- Progressive Change Campaign Committee
- Progressive Democrats of America
- Protect Our Future
- Sierra Club

Labor unions

- 1199SEIU United Healthcare Workers East
- AFL–CIO
- American Federation of State, County and Municipal Employees
- Communication Workers of America
- Florida Education Association
- National Nurses United
- Service Employees International Union Florida

Newspapers

- Orlando Sentinel
Natalie Jackson

Individuals

- Benjamin Crump, attorney for the families of Ahmaud Arbery, Breonna Taylor, George Floyd, and Jacob Blake
- Philonise Floyd, brother of George Floyd

==== Polling ====
Poll source	Date(s) administered	Sample size	Margin of error	Jack Achenbach	Jeff Boone	Randolph Bracy	Corrine Brown	Maxwell Alejandro Frost	Terence Gray	Alan Grayson	Natalie Jackson	Khalid Muneer	Teresa Tachon	Undecided
Data for Progress (D)	August 19–21, 2022	585 (LV)	± 4.0%	1%	0%	18%	6%	34%	3%	14%	5%	2%	1%	15%
Impact Research (D) (Note: This poll was sponsored by Bracy's campaign.)	May 24–31, 2022	400 (LV)	± 4.9%	–	1%	29%	–	9%	2%	–	5%	–	1%	53%

==== Debate ====
2022 Florida's 10th congressional district Democratic primary debate
No.	Date	Host	Moderator	Link	Democratic	Democratic	Democratic	Democratic	Democratic	Democratic	Democratic	Democratic	Democratic	Democratic
Key: P Participant A Absent N Not invited I Invited W Withdrawn														
Key: P Participant A Absent N Not invited I Invited W Withdrawn					Jack Achenbach	Jeffrey Boone	Randolph Bracy	Corrine Brown	Maxwell Alejandro Frost	Terence Gray	Alan Grayson	Natalie Jackson	Khalid Muneer	Teresa Tachon
1		WESH	Greg Fox		A	P	P	P	P	P	P	P	P	P

==== Results ====
Democratic primary results by precinct Frost: <30%; 30–40%; 40–50%; 50–60%; 60–70%; 70–80%; Bracy: <30%; 30–40%; 40–50%; 50–60%; Grayson: 30–40%; 40–50%

Democratic primary results
Party	Candidate	Votes	%
Democratic	Maxwell Alejandro Frost	19,288	34.8
Democratic	Randolph Bracy	13,677	24.7
Democratic	Alan Grayson	8,526	15.4
Democratic	Corrine Brown	5,274	9.5
Democratic	Natalie Jackson	3,872	7.0
Democratic	Teresa Tachon	1,301	2.4
Democratic	Jeffrey Boone	1,181	2.1
Democratic	Terence Gray	1,032	1.9
Democratic	Jack Achenbach	714	1.3
Democratic	Khalid Muneer	604	1.1
Total votes		55,469	100.0

=== Republican primary ===
==== Candidates ====
===== Nominee =====
- Calvin Wimbish, sales manager and retired U.S. Army colonel

===== Eliminated in primary =====
- Lateresa Jones, perennial candidate
- Tuan Le, cafe owner and electrical engineer
- Thuy Lowe, nominee for this district in 2016
- Willie Montague, pastor and candidate for this district in 2020
- Peter Weed

===== Withdrawn =====
- William King
- Carter Morgan
- Angela Walls-Windhauser, businesswoman and perennial candidate

==== Endorsements ====
Thuy Lowe

Newspapers

- Orlando Sentinel
Calvin Wimbish

Organizations

- Family Research Council Action PAC

==== Polling ====
Poll source	Date(s) administered	Sample size	Margin of error	Lateressa Jones	Tuan Le	Thuy Lowe	Willie Montague	Peter Weed	Calvin Wimbish	Undecided
Victory Insights (R) (Note: This poll was sponsored by Wimbish's campaign.)	August 19–21, 2022	– (LV)	–	13%	14%	7%	3%	10%	30%	24%

==== Debate ====
2022 Florida's 10th congressional district Republican primary debate
No.	Date	Host	Moderator	Link	Republican	Republican	Republican	Republican	Republican	Republican
Key: P Participant A Absent N Not invited I Invited W Withdrawn										
Key: P Participant A Absent N Not invited I Invited W Withdrawn					Lateressa Jones	Tuan Le	Thuy Lowe	Willie Montague	Peter Weed	Calvin Wimbish
1		WESH	Greg Fox	YouTube	P	P	P	I	P	P

==== Results ====
Republican primary results
Party	Candidate	Votes	%
Republican	Calvin Wimbish	12,103	44.4
Republican	Tuan Le	3,601	13.2
Republican	Peter Weed	3,541	13.0
Republican	Thuy Lowe	3,201	11.8
Republican	Willie Montague	3,176	11.7
Republican	Lateressa Jones	1,614	5.9
Total votes		27,236	100.0

=== Independent and third-party candidates ===
==== Independents ====
===== Declared =====
- Jason Holic, businessman
- Usha Jain, perennial candidate

=== General election ===
==== Predictions ====
Source	Ranking	As of
The Cook Political Report	Solid D	April 25, 2022
Inside Elections	Solid D	May 17, 2022
Sabato's Crystal Ball	Safe D	April 27, 2022
Politico	Solid D	April 28, 2022
RCP	Safe D	June 9, 2022
Fox News	Solid D	July 11, 2022
DDHQ	Solid D	July 20, 2022
538	Solid D	June 30, 2022
The Economist	Safe D	September 28, 2022

==== Results ====
Florida's 10th congressional district, 2022
Party	Candidate	Votes	%
Democratic	Maxwell Alejandro Frost	117,955	59.0
Republican	Calvin Wimbish	78,844	39.4
Independent	Jason Holic	2,001	1.0
Independent	Usha Jain	1,110	0.6
Total votes		199,910	100.0
Democratic hold			

== District 11 ==
2022 Florida's 11th congressional district election
- November 8, 2022
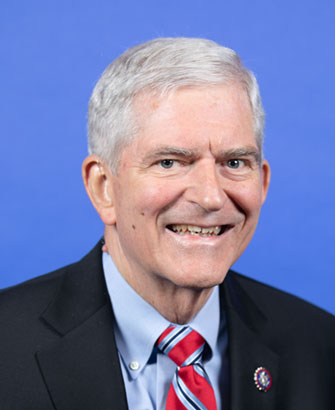

Nominee	Daniel Webster	Shante Munns
Party	Republican	Democratic
Popular vote	205,995	115,647
Percentage	63.07%	35.41%
- Webster: 50–60% 60–70% 70–80% 80–90% Munns: 50–60% 60–70% 70–80% No votes
U.S. Representative before election
Daniel Webster
Republican
Elected U.S. Representative
Daniel Webster
Republican

Republican Daniel Webster, who had represented the district since 2011, was re-elected with 66% of the vote in 2020. Webster won re-election in 2022.

The boundaries of the district were redrawn from 2020, determined by the 2020 redistricting cycle.

=== Republican primary ===
Republican primary results by precinct Webster: 40–50%; 50–60%; 60–70%; 70–80%; Loomer: 40–50%; 50–60%; 60–70%

==== Nominee ====
- Daniel Webster, incumbent U.S. representative

==== Eliminated in primary ====
- Laura Loomer, reporter for InfoWars, conspiracy theorist, activist, and nominee for the 21st district in 2020
- Gavriel Soriano, small business owner

==== Endorsements ====
Daniel Webster

U.S. representatives

- Kevin McCarthy, Minority Leader of the U.S. House of Representatives (2019–2023) and U.S. representative for California's 23rd congressional district (2007–2023)

Organizations

- Family Research Council Action PAC
- National Federation of Independent Business

Newspapers

- Orlando Sentinel
Laura Loomer

U.S. representatives

- Paul Gosar, U.S. representative for Arizona's 4th congressional district (2011–present)
- Marjorie Taylor Greene, U.S. representative for Georgia's 14th congressional district (2021–2026)

Individuals

- Michael Flynn, retired United States Army lieutenant general and 24th U.S. National Security Advisor.
- Roger Stone, political consultant and lobbyist

==== Results ====
Republican primary results
Party	Candidate	Votes	%
Republican	Daniel Webster (incumbent)	43,469	51.0
Republican	Laura Loomer	37,647	44.2
Republican	Gavriel Soriano	4,072	4.8
Total votes		85,188	100.0

=== Democratic primary ===
==== Candidates ====
===== Nominee =====
- Shante Munns, businesswoman

=== Independents ===
==== Candidates ====
===== Declared =====
- Kevin Porter

=== General election ===
==== Predictions ====
Source	Ranking	As of
The Cook Political Report	Solid R	April 25, 2022
Inside Elections	Solid R	May 17, 2022
Sabato's Crystal Ball	Safe R	April 27, 2022
Politico	Solid R	April 28, 2022
RCP	Safe R	June 9, 2022
Fox News	Solid R	July 11, 2022
DDHQ	Solid R	July 20, 2022
538	Solid R	June 30, 2022
The Economist	Safe R	September 28, 2022

==== Results ====
Florida's 11th congressional district, 2022
Party	Candidate	Votes	%
Republican	Daniel Webster (incumbent)	205,995	63.1
Democratic	Shante Munns	115,647	35.4
Independent	Kevin Porter	4,967	1.5
Total votes		326,609	100.0
Republican hold			

== District 12 ==
2022 Florida's 12th congressional district election
- November 8, 2022
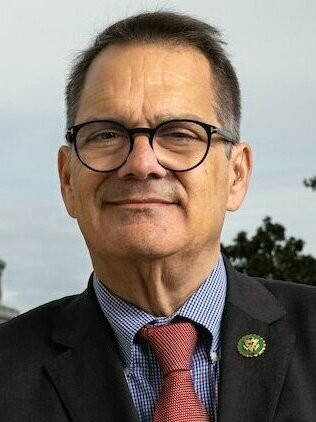

Nominee	Gus Bilirakis	Kimberly Walker
Party	Republican	Democratic
Popular vote	226,601	95,390
Percentage	70.38%	29.62%
- County results Billirakis: 60–70% 70–80%
U.S. Representative before election
Gus Bilirakis
Republican
Elected U.S. Representative
Gus Bilirakis
Republican

Republican Gus Bilirakis, who had represented the district since 2007, was re-elected with 63% of the vote in 2020. Bilirakis won re-election in 2022.

The boundaries of the district were redrawn from 2020, determined by the 2020 redistricting cycle.

=== Republican primary ===
==== Candidates ====
===== Nominee =====
- Gus Bilirakis, incumbent U.S. representative

===== Eliminated in primary =====
- Chris Leiser
- Jack Martin, pastor
- Brian Perras, U.S. Navy veteran and candidate for CA-29 in 2020
- Sid Preskitt, commercial diving contractor

==== Endorsements ====
Gus Bilirakis

U.S. presidents

- Donald Trump, former president of the United States (2017–2021)

Sheriffs

- Al Neinhuis, Hernando County sheriff
- Chris Nocco, Pasco County sheriff
- Mike Prendergast, Citrus County sheriff

Organizations

- United States Chamber of Commerce

==== Results ====
Republican primary results by county Map legend: Billirakis–70–80%; Billirakis–80–90%

Republican primary results
Party	Candidate	Votes	%
Republican	Gus Bilirakis (incumbent)	67,189	79.7
Republican	Jack Martin	7,790	9.2
Republican	Chris Leiser	4,000	4.7
Republican	Brian Perras	3,217	3.8
Republican	Sid Preskitt	2,142	2.5
Total votes		84,388	100.0

=== Democratic primary ===
==== Candidates ====
===== Nominee =====
- Kimberly Walker, businesswoman and U.S. Air Force veteran

=== General election ===
==== Predictions ====
Source	Ranking	As of
The Cook Political Report	Solid R	April 25, 2022
Inside Elections	Solid R	May 17, 2022
Sabato's Crystal Ball	Safe R	April 27, 2022
Politico	Solid R	April 28, 2022
RCP	Safe R	June 9, 2022
Fox News	Solid R	July 11, 2022
DDHQ	Solid R	July 20, 2022
538	Solid R	June 30, 2022
The Economist	Safe R	September 28, 2022

==== Results ====
Florida's 12th congressional district, 2022
Party	Candidate	Votes	%
Republican	Gus Bilirakis (incumbent)	226,601	70.4
Democratic	Kimberly Walker	95,390	29.6
Independent	Charles Smith (write-in)	4	0.0
Total votes		321,995	100.0
Republican hold			

== District 13 ==
2022 Florida's 13th congressional district election
- November 8, 2022
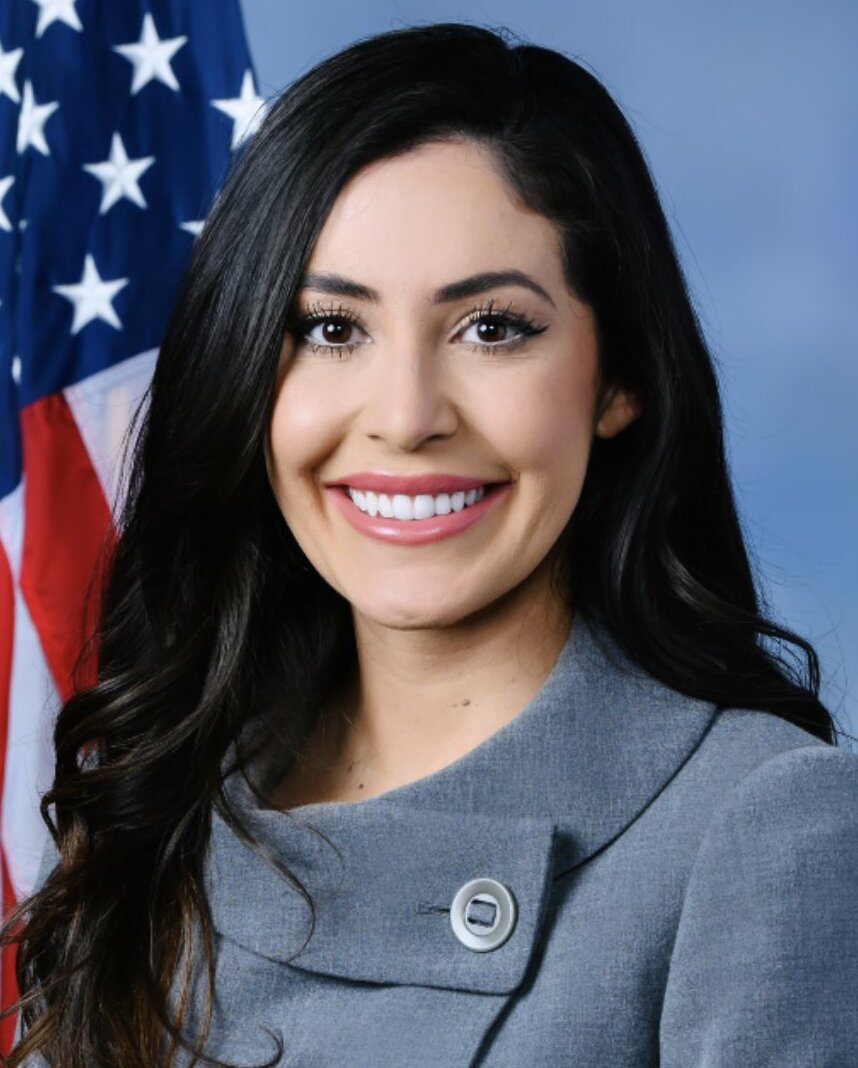

Nominee	Anna Paulina Luna	Eric Lynn
Party	Republican	Democratic
Popular vote	181,487	153,876
Percentage	53.14%	45.06%
- Precinct results Luna: 40–50% 50–60% 60–70% Lynn: 40–50% 50–60% 60–70% 70–80% 80–90% >90% No Votes
U.S. Representative before election
None (Vacant)
Elected U.S. Representative
Anna Paulina Luna
Republican

Democrat Charlie Crist was re-elected with 53% of the vote in 2020, having represented the district since January 3, 2017. He did not run for re-election to the House in 2022, but instead ran for and secured the Democratic nomination for the 2022 Florida gubernatorial election. Crist resigned from the House early on August 31, 2022.

The boundaries of the district had been redrawn from 2020, determined by the 2020 redistricting cycle. The 13th district was another district drawn to be much more conservative than on the previous map, by removing the east parts of Saint Petersburg city and jutting the district north to the Pasco-Pinellas border.

This district was included on the list of Democratic-held seats the National Republican Congressional Committee was targeting in 2022.

=== Democratic primary ===
==== Candidates ====
===== Nominee =====
- Eric Lynn, former senior advisor to the United States Secretary of Defense, candidate for this district in 2016

===== Disqualified =====
- Christian Hotchkiss, service representative at Macy's, Inc.

===== Withdrawn =====
- Ben Diamond, state representative from District 68 and grandson of former U.S. Representative Dante Fascell
- Michele Rayner, state representative from District 70 (2020–present) (running for re-election, endorsed Lynn)

===== Declined =====
- Charlie Crist, incumbent U.S. representative (running for governor)
- Rick Kriseman, former mayor of St. Petersburg and former state representative

==== Endorsements ====
Ben Diamond (withdrawn)

U.S. representatives

- ~~Jim Davis, former U.S. representative from Florida's 11th congressional district (1997–2007)~~ (switched endorsement to Lynn after Diamond withdrew)
- Steny Hoyer, U.S. representative from MD-05 (1981–present) and House Majority Leader (2019–present)

State officials

- Alex Sink, former chief financial officer of Florida (2007–2011)

State representatives

- Janet Long, former member of the Seminole, Florida City Council (2002–2006), state representative from district 51 (2008–2012) and Pinellas County Commissioner (2020–present)
- Sean Shaw, former state representative from the 61st district

Local officials

- Gina Driscoll, St. Pete City Council member (2018–present)
- Amy Foster, St. Pete City Council member (2014–2020)
- Brandi Gabbard, St. Pete City Council member (2018–present)
- ~~Pat Gerard, Pinellas County Commissioner (2014–present), former mayor of Largo (2006–2014)~~ (switched endorsement to Lynn after Diamond withdrew)

Organizations

- ~~League of Conservation Voters~~ (switched endorsement to Lynn after Diamond withdrew)
Eric Lynn

Federal officials

- Leon Panetta, former United States Secretary of Defense (2011–2013)

U.S. representatives

- Kathy Castor, U.S. representative for Florida's 14th congressional district (2007–)
- Charlie Crist, U.S. representative for this district
- Jim Davis, former U.S. representative from Florida's 11th congressional district (1997–2007) (previously endorsed Diamond)
- Peter Deutsch, former U.S. representative from Florida's 20th congressional district (1993–2005)
- Steve Israel, former U.S. representative for New York's 2nd (2001–2013) and 3rd (2013–2017) congressional districts
- Ron Klein, former U.S. representative for Florida's 22nd congressional district (2007–2011)
- Mel Levine, former U.S. representative from California's 27th congressional district (1983–1993)
- Kendrick Meek, former U.S. representative from Florida's 17th congressional district (2003–2011)
- Jimmy Panetta, U.S. representative from California's 18th congressional district (2017–present)
- Eric Swalwell, U.S. representative from California's 14th congressional district (2013–present)
- David Trone, U.S. representative for Maryland's 6th congressional district (2019–)
- Robert Wexler, former U.S. representative from Florida's 19th congressional district (1997–2010)

State legislators

- Michele Rayner, state representative from district 70 (2020–present) and withdrawn candidate in this election
- Jennifer Webb, former state representative (2018–2020)

Local officials

- Robyn Ache, former (Note: Article does not say former, but the city website does not list her as a current councilmember.) Belleair Beach city councilwoman
- Joe Barkley, Belleair Bluffs commissioner
- Jennie Blackburn, Redington Shores commissioner
- Gary Curtis, North Redington Beach town commissioner
- Pat Gerard, Pinellas County Commissioner (2014–present), former mayor of Largo (2006–2014) (previously endorsed Diamond)
- Copley Gerdes, St. Petersburg city councilmember
- Christopher Graus, St. Pete Beach commissioner
- Jim Olliver, vice mayor of Seminole (Republican) (post-primary)
- Paul Ray, Gulfport city councilman and former city commissioner (previously endorsed Rayner)
- Jamie Robinson, Largo city commissioner
- Bob Schmidt, mayor of Belleair Shore (Republican) (post-primary)
- Patrick Soranno, mayor of Indian Shores (Independent) (post-primary)
- April Thanos, Gulfport deputy mayor
- Ken Welch, mayor of St. Petersburg

Individuals

- Susan Latvala, former Pinellas County commissioner (Independent) (post-primary)
- Beverly Young, widow of Bill Young, U.S. representative from Florida (1972–2013) (post-primary)

Organizations

- End Citizens United
- Independent Party of Florida (post-primary)
- League of Conservation Voters (previously endorsed Diamond)
- Let America Vote
- Sierra Club
Michele Rayner (withdrawn)

U.S. representatives

- David Cicilline, U.S. representative from Rhode Island's 1st congressional district (2011–present)
- Mark Takano, U.S. representative from California's 41st congressional district (2013–present)
- Ritchie Torres, U.S. representative from New York's 15th congressional district (2021–)

State legislators

- Ed Narain, former state representative (2014–2016)

Local officials

- Deborah Figgs-Sanders, member of the St. Petersburg city council
- Steve Kornell, former member of the St. Petersburg city council
- ~~Paul Ray, Gulfport city councilman and former city commissioner~~ (switched endorsement to Lynn after Rayner withdrew)
- Michael Smith, Largo city commissioner
- Lisa Wheeler-Bowman, member of the St. Petersburg city council

Organizations

- Congressional Black Caucus PAC
- Democracy for America
- EMILY's List
- Equality PAC
- LGBTQ Victory Fund
- LPAC
- National Black Justice Coalition

=== Republican primary ===
==== Candidates ====
===== Nominee =====
- Anna Paulina Luna, director of Hispanic Engagement for Turning Point USA, U.S. Air Force veteran, and nominee for this district in 2020

===== Eliminated in primary =====
- Kevin Hayslett, attorney
- Moneer Kheireddine, law student at Stetson College of Law, former student body president at the University of South Florida (2017–2019), former employee of Metropolitan Ministries and freelance writer
- Amanda Makki, attorney and candidate for this district in 2020
- Christine Quinn, businesswoman and nominee for FL-14 in 2016 and 2020

===== Withdrew =====
- William Braddock
- Audrey Henson, businesswoman (running for state representative)

==== Endorsements ====
Kevin Hayslett

State legislators

- Ed Hooper, state senator
- Chris Sprowls, speaker of the Florida House of Representatives

Sheriffs

- Jim Coats, former sheriff of Pinellas County (2004–2011)
- Bob Gualtieri, sheriff of Pinellas County
- Grady Judd, sheriff of Polk County

Individuals

- Michael Flynn, retired United States Army lieutenant general, former U.S. National Security Advisor

Organizations

- Tea Party Express

Newspapers

- Tampa Bay Times
Anna Paulina Luna

Executive branch officials

- Richard Grenell, former United States Ambassador to Germany (2018–2020)
- Donald Trump, 45th president of the United States (2017–2021)

Governors

- Ron DeSantis, governor of Florida (2019–present) (post-primary)

U.S. representatives

- Lauren Boebert, U.S. representative from Colorado's 3rd congressional district
- Byron Donalds, U.S. representative from Florida's 19th congressional district
- Newt Gingrich, former U.S. Speaker of the House (1995–1999) and U.S. representative from GA-06 (1979–1999)
- Marjorie Taylor Greene, U.S. representative from Georgia's 14th congressional district
- Elise Stefanik, U.S. representative from New York's 21st congressional district
- Greg Steube, U.S. representative from Florida's 17th congressional district

Local officials

- Rick Baker, former mayor of St. Petersburg (2001–2010)
- Robert G. Blackmon, former St. Petersburg City Council member

Individuals

- Sheila Griffin, attorney, candidate for St. Petersburg city council in 2015 and Florida's 13th congressional district in 2020

Organizations

- Club for Growth
- Elevate PAC
- Gun Owners of America
- House Freedom Fund
- Republican Liberty Caucus
- Stand for Health Freedom
- Susan B. Anthony Pro-Life America Candidate Fund
- Turning Point Action
Amanda Makki

U.S. representatives

- Jake Ellzey, U.S. representative for Texas's 6th congressional district (2021–)

State officials

- Chris Latvala, state representative

Local officials

- Woody Brown, mayor of Largo
- Marybeth Henderson, mayor of Redington Shores
- John Hendricks, mayor of Madeira Beach
- Frank Hibbard, mayor of Clearwater
- Bill Queen, mayor of North Redington Beach
- Dan Saracki, mayor of Oldsmar
- Bob Schmidt, mayor of Belleair Shore
- Leslie Waters, mayor of Seminole
- David Will, mayor of Redington Beach

Individuals

- George Buck, nominee for this district in 2018
- Beverly Young, widow of Bill Young, U.S. representative from Florida (1972–2013)

Organizations

- Maggie's List
- Republican Main Street Partnership
- SEAL PAC

==== Debate ====
2022 Florida's 13th congressional district debate
No.	Date	Host	Moderator	Link	Republican	Republican	Republican	Republican	Republican	Republican	Republican
Key: P Participant A Absent N Not invited I Invited W Withdrawn											
Key: P Participant A Absent N Not invited I Invited W Withdrawn					William Braddock	Kevin Hayslett	Audrey Henson	Moneer Kheireddine	Anna Paulina Luna	Amanda Makki	Christine Quinn
1	Apr. 6, 2022	Abundant Life Ministries Church	Michael O'Fallon		W	P	P	N	P	P	P

==== Polling ====
Poll source	Date(s) administered	Sample size	Margin of error	Kevin Hayslett	Audrey Henson	Moneer Kheireddine	Anna Paulina Luna	Amanda Makki	Christine Quinn	Matt Tito	Undecided
St. Pete Polls	August 15, 2022	436 (LV)	± 4.7%	34%	–	3%	37%	14%	3%	–	9%
American Viewpoint (R) (Note: This poll was sponsored by Hayslett's campaign.)	July 24–27, 2022	400 (LV)	± 4.9%	34%	–	1%	36%	9%	1%	–	15%
The Tyson Group (R)	July 5–7, 2022	400 (LV)	± 4.9%	17%	–	1%	37%	10%	2%	–	33%
American Viewpoint (R)	Late June 2022	– (LV)	–	19%	–	1%	42%	13%	1%	–	20%
Spry Strategies (R) (Note: This poll was sponsored by Luna's campaign.)	June 8–11, 2022	556 (LV)	± 4.2%	16%	–	–	36%	10%	1%	–	38%
Spry Strategies (R)	March 23–27, 2022	847 (LV)	± 3.3%	9%	2%	–	35%	9%	4%	–	42%
St. Pete Polls	October 23–24, 2021	518 (LV)	± 4.3%	–	2%	–	37%	6%	–	3%	52%

==== Results ====
Republican primary results
Party	Candidate	Votes	%
Republican	Anna Paulina Luna	37,156	44.5
Republican	Kevin Hayslett	28,108	33.7
Republican	Amanda Makki	14,159	17.0
Republican	Christine Quinn	2,510	3.0
Republican	Moneer Khiereddine	1,599	1.9
Total votes		83,532	100.0

=== Independent and third-party candidates ===
==== Libertarian Party ====
===== Nominee =====
- Frank Craft, business owner

==== Write-ins ====
===== Declared =====
- Jacob Curnow, author and candidate for this district in 2020
- Dwight Young, public safety employee and candidate for U.S. Senate in 2016

=== General election ===
==== Predictions ====
Source	Ranking	As of
The Cook Political Report	Lean R (flip)	November 7, 2022
Inside Elections	Lean R (flip)	November 3, 2022
Sabato's Crystal Ball	Likely R (flip)	April 27, 2022
Politico	Likely R (flip)	April 28, 2022
RCP	Likely R (flip)	June 9, 2022
Fox News	Likely R (flip)	July 11, 2022
DDHQ	Likely R (flip)	September 29, 2022
538	Likely R (flip)	October 30, 2022
The Economist	Lean R (flip)	November 1, 2022

==== Polling ====
Graphical summary

Poll source	Date(s) administered	Sample size	Margin of error	Eric Lynn (D)	Anna Paulina Luna (R)	Undecided
St. Pete Polls/Fextel	October 26–27, 2022	509 (LV)	± 4.3%	45%	46%	9%
David Binder Research (D)	October 4–6, 2022	600 (LV)	± 4.0%	47%	47%	6%
David Binder Research (D) (Note: This poll was sponsored by Progress Pinellas.)	June 25–28, 2022	600 (LV)	± 4.0%	45%	43%	12%
Global Strategy Group (D) (Note: This poll was sponsored by Lynn's campaign.)	June 6–9, 2022	500 (LV)	± 4.4%	36%	45%	20%

Hypothetical polling

Eric Lynn vs. Kevin Hayslett

Poll source	Date(s) administered	Sample size	Margin of error	Eric Lynn (D)	Kevin Hayslett (R)	Undecided
Global Strategy Group (D)	June 6–9, 2022	500 (LV)	± 4.4%	36%	39%	23%

Eric Lynn vs. Amanda Makki

Poll source	Date(s) administered	Sample size	Margin of error	Eric Lynn (D)	Amanda Makki (R)	Undecided
Global Strategy Group (D)	June 6–9, 2022	500 (LV)	± 4.4%	36%	41%	22%

Generic Democrat vs. generic Republican

Poll source	Date(s) administered	Sample size	Margin of error	Generic Democrat	Generic Republican	Undecided
Global Strategy Group (D)	June 6–9, 2022	500 (LV)	± 4.4%	37%	47%	16%

==== Results ====
Florida's 13th congressional district, 2022
Party	Candidate	Votes	%
Republican	Anna Paulina Luna	181,487	53.1
Democratic	Eric Lynn	153,876	45.1
Libertarian	Frank Craft	6,163	1.8
Write-in		20	0.0
Total votes		341,546	100.0
Republican gain from Democratic			

== District 14 ==
2022 Florida's 14th congressional district election
- November 8, 2022
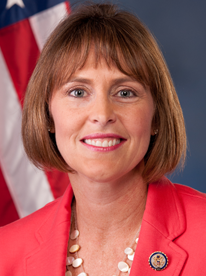

Nominee	Kathy Castor	James Judge
Party	Democratic	Republican
Popular vote	149,737	113,427
Percentage	56.9%	43.1%
- Castor: 50–60% 60–70% 70–80% 80–90% >90% Judge: 50–60% 60–70% 70–80% 80–90%
U.S. Representative before election
Kathy Castor
Democratic
Elected U.S. Representative
Kathy Castor
Democratic

Democrat Kathy Castor, who had represented the district since 2007, was re-elected with 60% of the vote in 2020. Castor won re-election in 2022.

The boundaries of the district were redrawn from 2020, determined by the 2020 redistricting cycle. As a result of redistricting, the 14th lost some of north Hillsborough County, while taking in the east parts of Pinellas. As a result, this made the neighboring 13th district more conservative.

=== Democratic primary ===
Democratic primary results by county Map legend: Castor–>90%

==== Candidates ====
===== Nominee =====
- Kathy Castor, incumbent U.S. representative

===== Eliminated in primary =====
- Christopher Bradley, IT professional

==== Endorsements ====
Kathy Castor

Organizations

- Emgage
- Feminist Majority PAC
- League of Conservation Voters
- Natural Resources Defense Council
- Planned Parenthood Action Fund
- Sierra Club

Labor unions

- AFSCME Florida
- Service Employees International Union

Newspapers

- Tampa Bay Times

==== Results ====
Democratic primary results
Party	Candidate	Votes	%
Democratic	Kathy Castor (incumbent)	62,562	90.3
Democratic	Christopher Bradley	6,684	9.7
Total votes		69,246	100.0

=== Republican primary ===
==== Candidates ====
===== Nominee =====
- James Judge, businessman and Coast Guard veteran

===== Eliminated in primary =====
- Sam Nashagh, naval aviator and combat veteran in the United States Marine Corps
- Jerry Torres, former Green Beret, founder of Torres Advanced Enterprise Solutions (previously filed to run in the 15th district) (disqualified from race, then restored to ballot)

===== Withdrawn =====
- Jay Collins, Army veteran (ran in the 15th district, then ran for state senate)
- Christine Quinn, businesswoman and nominee for this district in 2016 and 2020 (running in the 13th district)

==== Endorsements ====
Jay Collins (withdrawn)

Organizations

- SEAL PAC
James Judge

U.S. senators

- Rick Scott, U.S. senator from Florida

U.S. representatives

- Paul Gosar, U.S. representative for Arizona's 1st (2011–2013) and Arizona's 4th (2013–) congressional districts
- Ted Yoho, former U.S. representative for Florida's 3rd congressional district (2013–2021)

Local officials

- Rick Baker, former mayor of St. Petersburg (2001–2010)
- Frank Hibbard, mayor of Clearwater

Organizations

- Florida Police Benevolent Association
- Tampa Police Benevolent Association

Newspapers

- Tampa Bay Times
Jerry Torres

State legislators

- Jackie Toledo, state representative

==== Results ====
Republican primary results by county Map legend: Judge–50–60%

Republican primary results
Party	Candidate	Votes	%
Republican	James Judge	20,466	53.1
Republican	Jerry Torres	11,398	29.6
Republican	Sam Nashagh	6,650	17.3
Total votes		38,514	100.0

=== General election ===
==== Predictions ====
Source	Ranking	As of
The Cook Political Report	Solid D	April 25, 2022
Inside Elections	Solid D	May 17, 2022
Sabato's Crystal Ball	Safe D	April 27, 2022
Politico	Solid D	April 28, 2022
RCP	Likely D	October 31, 2022
Fox News	Solid D	October 11, 2022
DDHQ	Solid D	July 20, 2022
538	Solid D	June 30, 2022
The Economist	Safe D	September 28, 2022

==== Results ====
Florida's 14th congressional district, 2022
Party	Candidate	Votes	%
Democratic	Kathy Castor (incumbent)	149,737	56.9
Republican	James Judge	113,427	43.1
Total votes		263,164	100.0
Democratic hold			

== District 15 ==
2022 Florida's 15th congressional district election
- November 8, 2022
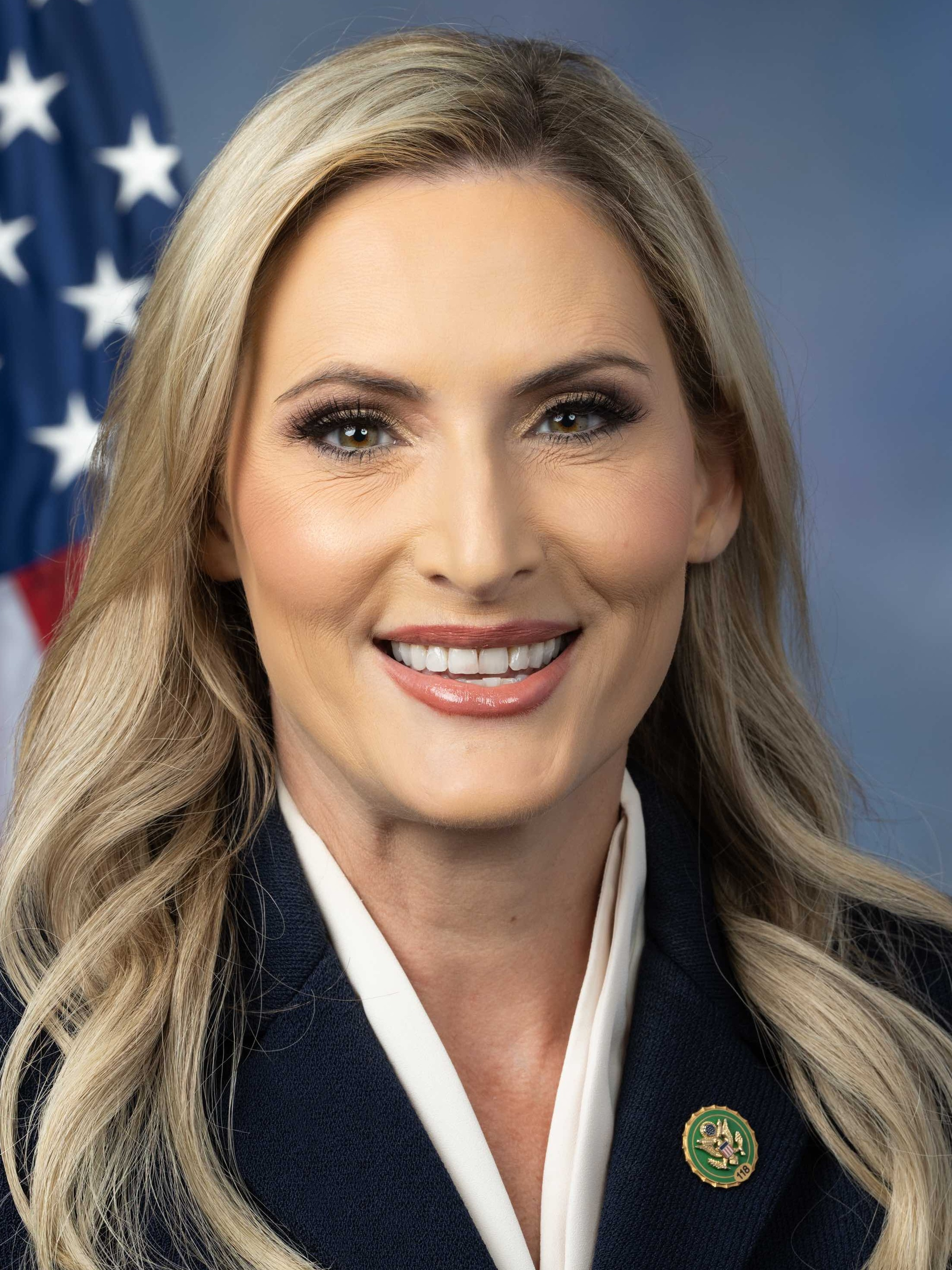

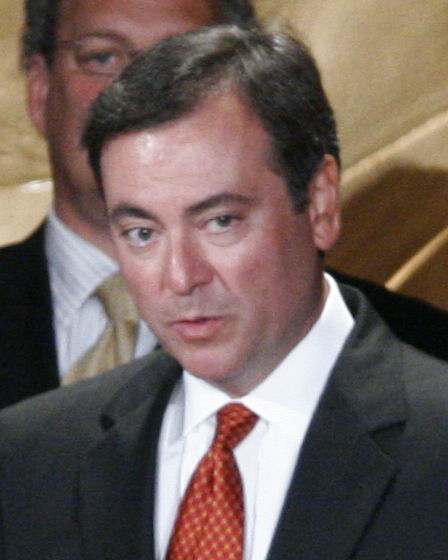
Nominee	Laurel Lee	Alan Cohn
Party	Republican	Democratic
Popular vote	145,219	102,835
Percentage	58.54%	41.46%
- County results Lee: 50–60% 60–70%
U.S. Representative before election
None (new seat)
Elected U.S. Representative
Laurel Lee
Republican

Florida gained one more congressional seat based on the 2020 census.

=== Republican primary ===
==== Candidates ====
===== Nominee =====
- Laurel Lee, former Florida Secretary of State (2019–2022)

===== Eliminated in primary =====
- Demetries Grimes, retired Navy commander
- Kevin John "Mac" McGovern, retired U.S. Navy captain (previously filed to run in the 7th district)
- Kelli Stargel, state senator from the 22nd district (2016–present) and 15th district (2012–2016)
- Jackie Toledo, state representative

===== Withdrawn =====
- Jay Collins, Army veteran (previously filed to run in the 14th district) (running for state senate) (endorsed Lee)
- Dennis Ross, former U.S. representative for the 12th district (2011–2013) and this district (2013–2019)
- Jerry Torres, former Green Beret, founder of Torres Advanced Enterprise Solutions (running in the 14th district)

==== Endorsements ====
Laurel Lee

U.S. representatives

- Gus Bilirakis, U.S. representative for Florida's 12th congressional district (post-primary)
- Scott Franklin, U.S. representative for Florida's 15th congressional district (post-primary)

State officials

- Ashley Moody, Florida attorney general

Sheriffs

- Chad Chronister, Hillsborough County sheriff (post-primary, endorsed Toledo before primary)
- Grady Judd, Polk County sheriff (post-primary, endorsed Stargel before primary)
- Chris Nocco, Pasco County sheriff

Local officials

- Bill Dodson, Plant City commissioner
- Jason Jones, Plant City commissioner
- Nathan Kilton, mayor of Plant City
- Rick Lott, former mayor of Plant City
- Michael Sparkman, vice mayor of Plant City

Organizations

- Americans for Prosperity Action-Florida
- Maggie's List (post-primary, endorsed Toledo before primary)

Newspapers

- Tampa Bay Times
Kelli Stargel

State legislators

- Wilton Simpson, president of the Florida Senate

State attorneys

- Brian Haas, state attorney for the 10th Circuit Court

Sheriffs

- Grady Judd, Polk County sheriff (switched endorsement to Lee after Stargel was eliminated)
Jackie Toledo

Sheriffs

- Chad Chronister, Hillsborough County sheriff (switched endorsement to Lee after Toledo was eliminated)

Organizations

- Maggie's List (switched endorsement to Lee after Toledo was eliminated)

==== Polling ====
Poll source	Date(s) administered	Sample size	Margin of error	Demetries Grimes	Laurel Lee	Kevin McGovern	Kelli Stargel	Jackie Toledo	Undecided
Victory Insights (R) (Note: Poll sponsored by Grimes' campaign)	August 2022	– (LV)	–	17%	36%	6%	17%	5%	19%
St. Pete Polls	August 18, 2022	267 (LV)	± 6.0%	7%	47%	8%	20%	5%	13%
St. Pete Polls	August 1, 2022	275 (LV)	± 5.9%	5%	44%	5%	16%	11%	20%
The Tyson Group (R)	July 5–7, 2022	400 (LV)	± 4.9%	5%	10%	3%	13%	10%	58%

==== Results ====
Republican primary results by county Map legend: Lee–40–50%; Stargel–40–50%

Republican primary results
Party	Candidate	Votes	%
Republican	Laurel Lee	22,481	41.5
Republican	Kelli Stargel	15,072	27.8
Republican	Jackie Toledo	6,307	11.6
Republican	Demetries Grimes	5,629	10.4
Republican	Kevin McGovern	4,713	8.7
Total votes		54,202	100.0

=== Democratic primary ===
==== Candidates ====
===== Nominee =====
- Alan Cohn, Peabody and Emmy award-winning journalist and nominee for Florida's 15th congressional district in 2014 and 2020

===== Eliminated in primary =====
- Gavin Brown, political consultant
- Eddie Geller, comedian
- Cesar Ramirez, Army veteran
- William VanHorn, aerospace contractor

===== Declined =====
- Rena Frazier, co-founder of the All For Transportation pro-transit committee in Hillsborough County
- Adam Hattersley, former state representative and candidate for Florida's 15th congressional district in 2020 (running for chief financial officer)

==== Endorsements ====
Alan Cohn

U.S. representatives

- Kathy Castor, U.S. representative for Florida's 14th congressional district
- Charlie Crist, U.S. representative for Florida's 13th congressional district
- Lois Frankel, U.S. representative for Florida's 21st congressional district
- Debbie Wasserman Schultz, U.S. representative for Florida's 23rd congressional district

State officials

- Betty Castor, former education commissioner of Florida (1986–1994)
- Alex Sink, former chief financial officer of Florida (2007–2011)

State legislators

- Samuel Bell III, former majority leader of the Florida House of Representatives

Local officials

- Andrew H. Warren, former state attorney for the 13th judicial circuit

Unions

- Communication Workers of America
- Teamsters Local 79
- United Food and Commercial Workers Local 1625

Newspapers

- Tampa Bay Times
Eddie Geller

State representatives

- Anna Eskamani, state representative
- Sean Shaw, former state representative (2016–2018) and nominee for Florida attorney general in 2018

Individuals

- Dulé Hill, actor

Organizations

- Progressive Change Campaign Committee

==== Debate ====
2022 Florida's 15th congressional district Democratic primary debate
No.	Date	Host	Moderator	Link	Democratic	Democratic	Democratic	Democratic	Democratic
Key: P Participant A Absent N Not invited I Invited W Withdrawn									
Key: P Participant A Absent N Not invited I Invited W Withdrawn					Gavin Brown	Alan Cohn	Eddie Geller	Cesar Ramirez	William VanHorn
1	Aug. 4, 2022	North Tampa Democrats		YouTube	P	P	P	P	P

==== Results ====
Democratic primary results by county Map legend: Cohn–<30%; Cohn–30–40%

Democratic primary results
Party	Candidate	Votes	%
Democratic	Alan M. Cohn	14,928	33.1
Democratic	Gavin Brown	10,034	22.3
Democratic	Eddie Geller	9,859	21.9
Democratic	Cesar Ramirez	7,817	17.3
Democratic	William VanHorn	2,435	5.4
Total votes		45,073	100.0

=== General election ===
==== Predictions ====
Source	Ranking	As of
The Cook Political Report	Likely R	April 25, 2022
Inside Elections	Likely R	May 17, 2022
Sabato's Crystal Ball	Likely R	April 27, 2022
Politico	Likely R	October 18, 2022
RCP	Likely R	June 9, 2022
Fox News	Likely R	July 11, 2022
DDHQ	Lean R	August 29, 2022
538	Solid R	October 19, 2022
The Economist	Likely R	September 28, 2022

==== Polling ====
Poll source	Date(s) administered	Sample size	Margin of error	Alan Cohn (D)	Laurel Lee (R)	Undecided
Alvarado Strategies (R) (Note: Poll sponsored by Floridians for Economic Advancement)	September 19–20, 2022	352 (LV)	± 5.2%	34%	41%	24%
GQR Research (D) (Note: This poll was sponsored by Cohn's campaign.)	August 24–29, 2022	400 (LV)	± 4.9%	44%	47%	9%

==== Results ====
Florida's 15th congressional district, 2022
Party	Candidate	Votes	%
Republican	Laurel Lee	145,219	58.5
Democratic	Alan M. Cohn	102,835	41.5
Total votes		248,054	100.0
Republican win (new seat)			

== District 16 ==
2022 Florida's 16th congressional district election
- November 8, 2022
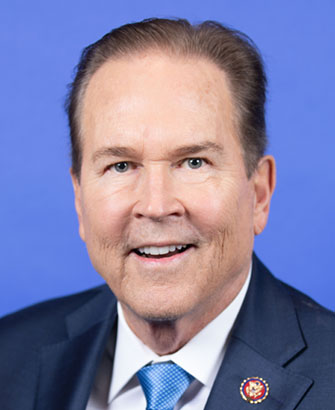

Nominee	Vern Buchanan	Jan Schneider
Party	Republican	Democratic
Popular vote	189,762	115,575
Percentage	62.15%	37.85%
- Buchanan: 50–60% 60–70% 70–80% 80–90% >90% Schneider: 50–60% 60–70% 70–80% 80–90% Tie: 40–50%
U.S. Representative before election
Vern Buchanan
Republican
Elected U.S. Representative
Vern Buchanan
Republican

Republican Vern Buchanan, who had represented the district since 2007, was reelected with 56% of the vote in 2020. Buchanan won re-election in 2022.

The boundaries of the district were redrawn from 2020, determined by the 2020 redistricting cycle.

=== Republican primary ===
==== Candidates ====
===== Nominee =====
- Vern Buchanan, incumbent U.S. representative

===== Eliminated in primary =====
- Martin Hyde, businessman

==== Endorsements ====
Vern Buchanan

Executive branch officials

- Donald Trump, 45th president of the United States (2017–2021)

Newspapers

- Tampa Bay Times
Martin Hyde

Executive branch officials

- Michael Flynn, former United States National Security Advisor

Individuals

- Roger Stone, political consultant

==== Polling ====
Poll source	Date(s) administered	Sample size	Margin of error	Vern Buchanan	Martin Hyde	Undecided
St. Pete Polls	February 7, 2022	501 (LV)	± 4.4%	76%	12%	12%

==== Results ====
Republican primary results by county Map legend: Buchanan–80–90%

Republican primary results
Party	Candidate	Votes	%
Republican	Vern Buchanan (incumbent)	64,028	86.2
Republican	Martin Hyde	10,219	13.8
Total votes		74,247	100.0

=== Democratic primary ===
==== Candidates ====
===== Nominee =====
- Jan Schneider, candidate for this district in 2016 and 2018

=== General election ===
==== Predictions ====
Source	Ranking	As of
The Cook Political Report	Solid R	April 25, 2022
Inside Elections	Solid R	May 17, 2022
Sabato's Crystal Ball	Safe R	April 27, 2022
Politico	Likely R	April 28, 2022
RCP	Safe R	June 9, 2022
Fox News	Solid R	July 11, 2022
DDHQ	Solid R	July 20, 2022
538	Solid R	June 30, 2022
The Economist	Safe R	September 28, 2022

==== Results ====
Florida's 16th congressional district, 2022
Party	Candidate	Votes	%
Republican	Vern Buchanan (incumbent)	189,762	62.1
Democratic	Jan Schneider	115,575	37.9
Independent	Ralph E. Hartman (write-in)	21	0.0
Total votes		305,358	100.0
Republican hold			

== District 17 ==
2022 Florida's 17th congressional district election
- November 8, 2022
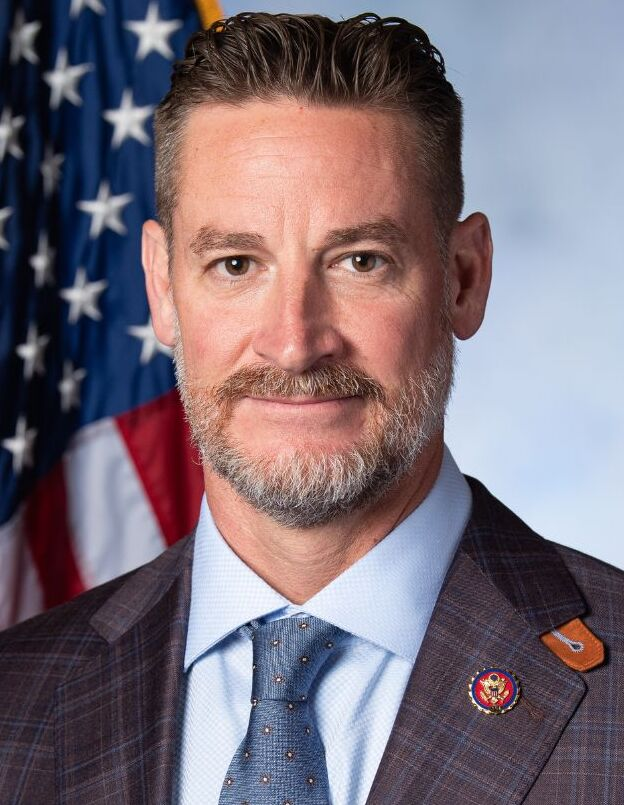

Nominee	Greg Steube	Andrea Kale
Party	Republican	Democratic
Popular vote	222,483	123,798
Percentage	63.85%	35.51%
- Steube: 50–60% 60–70% 70–80% 80–90% >90% Kale: 50–60% 60–70% 70–80%
U.S. Representative before election
Greg Steube
Republican
Elected U.S. Representative
Greg Steube
Republican

Republican Greg Steube, who had represented the district since 2019, was re-elected with 64% of the vote in 2020. Steube won re-election in 2022.

The boundaries of the district were redrawn from 2020, determined by the 2020 redistricting cycle. This district lost all of its previous rural counties, while being redrawn to encompass the entirety of Sarasota County.

=== Republican primary ===
==== Candidates ====
===== Nominee =====
- Greg Steube, incumbent U.S. representative

==== Endorsements ====
Greg Steube

Executive branch officials

- Donald Trump, 45th president of the United States (2017–2021)

Organizations

- Club for Growth PAC

=== Democratic primary ===
==== Candidates ====
===== Nominee =====
- Andrea Doria Kale

===== Declined =====
- Allen Ellison, political consultant and nominee for this district in 2018 and 2020 (running in District 23)

=== Independent and third-party candidates ===
==== Candidates ====
===== Declared =====
- Theodore Murray, former high school football coach and candidate for this district in 2020

=== General election ===
==== Predictions ====
Source	Ranking	As of
The Cook Political Report	Solid R	April 25, 2022
Inside Elections	Solid R	May 17, 2022
Sabato's Crystal Ball	Safe R	April 27, 2022
Politico	Solid R	April 28, 2022
RCP	Safe R	June 9, 2022
Fox News	Solid R	July 11, 2022
DDHQ	Solid R	July 20, 2022
538	Solid R	June 30, 2022
The Economist	Safe R	September 28, 2022

==== Results ====
Florida's 17th congressional district, 2022
Party	Candidate	Votes	%
Republican	Greg Steube (incumbent)	222,483	63.8
Democratic	Andrea Kale	123,798	35.5
Independent	Theodore Murray	2,225	0.6
Total votes		348,506	100.0
Republican hold			

== District 18 ==
2022 Florida's 18th congressional district election
- November 8, 2022
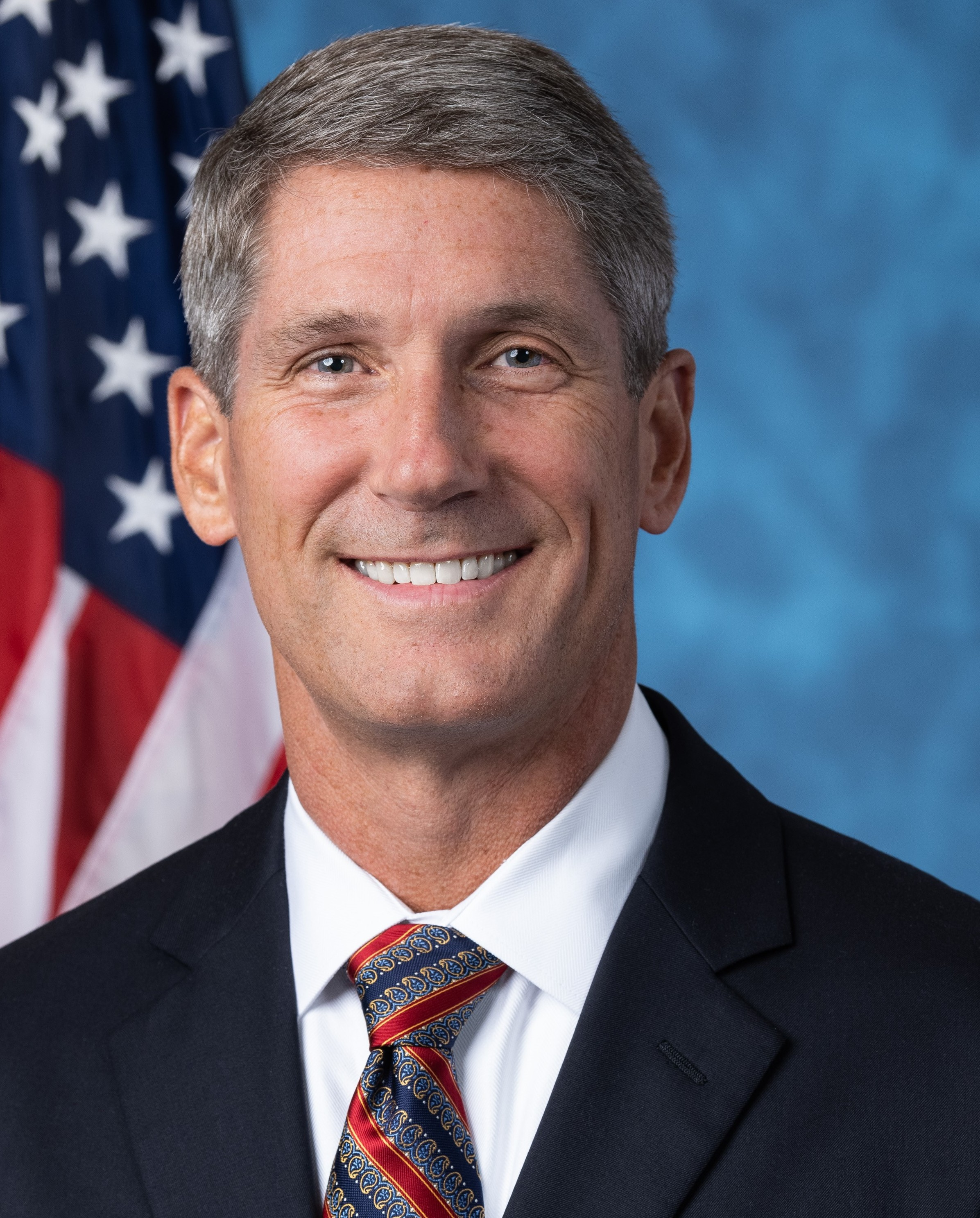

Nominee	Scott Franklin	Keith Hayden
Party	Republican	Independent
Popular vote	167,429	56,647
Percentage	74.72%	25.28%
- Franklin: 50–60% 60–70% 70–80% 80–90% >90% Hayden: 50–60% 60–70% 70–80% 80–90%
U.S. Representative before election
Scott Franklin
Republican
Elected U.S. Representative
Scott Franklin
Republican

Republican Scott Franklin, who had represented the district since 2021, was elected with 55% of the vote in 2020. Franklin won re-election in 2022.

The boundaries of the district were redrawn from 2020, determined by the 2020 redistricting cycle.

=== Republican primary ===
==== Candidates ====
===== Nominee =====
- Scott Franklin, incumbent U.S. representative

===== Eliminated in primary =====
- Kenneth Hartpence, network engineer
- Jennifer Raybon, attorney
- Wendy Schmeling, pastor
- Eddie Tarazona, cigar company owner

==== Results ====
Republican primary results by county Map legend: Franklin–50–60%; Franklin–60–70%; Franklin–70–80%; Franklin–80–90%

Republican primary results
Party	Candidate	Votes	%
Republican	Scott Franklin (incumbent)	44,927	73.1
Republican	Jennifer Raybon	6,606	10.7
Republican	Wendy June Schmeling	4,099	6.7
Republican	Kenneth James Hartpence	3,999	6.5
Republican	Eddie Tarazona	1,864	3.0
Total votes		61,495	100.0

=== Independent and third-party candidates ===
==== Candidates ====
- Keith R Hayden Jr, US Navy veteran

==== Predictions ====
Source	Ranking	As of
The Cook Political Report	Solid R	April 25, 2022
Inside Elections	Solid R	May 17, 2022
Sabato's Crystal Ball	Safe R	April 27, 2022
Politico	Solid R	April 28, 2022
RCP	Safe R	June 9, 2022
Fox News	Solid R	July 11, 2022
DDHQ	Solid R	July 20, 2022
538	Solid R	June 30, 2022
The Economist	Safe R	September 28, 2022

==== Results ====
Florida's 18th congressional district, 2022
Party	Candidate	Votes	%
Republican	Scott Franklin (incumbent)	167,429	74.7
Independent	Keith Hayden Jr	56,647	25.3
Independent	Leonard Serratore (write-in)	158	0.1
Total votes		224,234	100.0
Republican hold			

== District 19 ==
2022 Florida's 19th congressional district election
- November 8, 2022
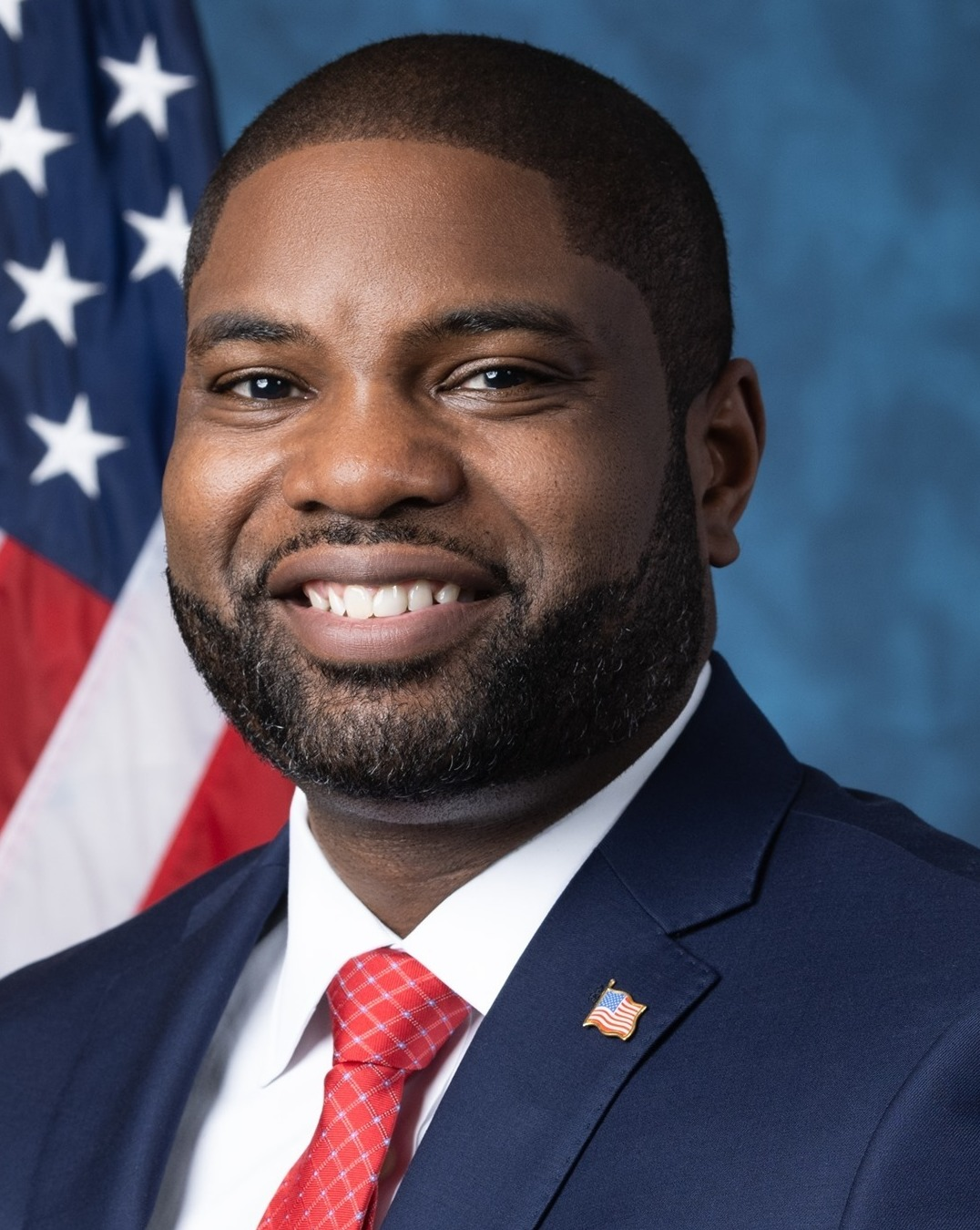

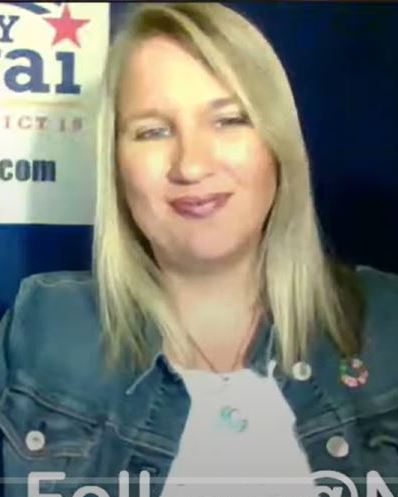
Nominee	Byron Donalds	Cindy Banyai
Party	Republican	Democratic
Popular vote	213,035	100,226
Percentage	68.01%	31.99%
- Donalds: 50–60% 60–70% 70–80% 80–90% Banyai: 50–60% 70–80%
U.S. Representative before election
Byron Donalds
Republican
Elected U.S. Representative
Byron Donalds
Republican

Republican Byron Donalds, who had represented the district since 2021, was elected with 61% of the vote in 2020. Donalds won re-election in 2022.

The boundaries of the district were redrawn from 2020, determined by the 2020 redistricting cycle.

=== Republican primary ===
==== Candidates ====
===== Nominee =====
- Byron Donalds, incumbent U.S. representative

===== Eliminated in primary =====
- Jim Huff, civilian member of the United States Army Corps of Engineers

===== Endorsements =====
Byron Donalds

Executive branch officials

- Donald Trump, 45th president of the United States (2017–2021)

U.S. senators

- Tim Scott, U.S. senator from South Carolina (2013–present)

Organizations

- Black America's Political Action Committee
- Turning Point Action

==== Results ====
Republican primary results
Party	Candidate	Votes	%
Republican	Byron Donalds (incumbent)	76,192	83.7
Republican	Jim Huff	14,795	16.3
Total votes		90,987	100.0

=== Democratic primary ===
==== Candidates ====
===== Nominee =====
- Cindy Banyai, political science professor at Florida Gulf Coast University and nominee for this district in 2020

=== General election ===
==== Predictions ====
Source	Ranking	As of
The Cook Political Report	Solid R	April 25, 2022
Inside Elections	Solid R	May 17, 2022
Sabato's Crystal Ball	Safe R	April 27, 2022
Politico	Solid R	April 28, 2022
RCP	Safe R	June 9, 2022
Fox News	Solid R	July 11, 2022
DDHQ	Solid R	July 20, 2022
538	Solid R	June 30, 2022
The Economist	Safe R	September 28, 2022

==== Results ====
Florida's 19th congressional district, 2022
Party	Candidate	Votes	%
Republican	Byron Donalds (incumbent)	213,035	68.0
Democratic	Cindy Banyai	100,226	32.0
Independent	Patrick Post (write-in)	13	0.0
Total votes		313,274	100.0
Republican hold			

== District 20 ==
2022 Florida's 20th congressional district election
- November 8, 2022
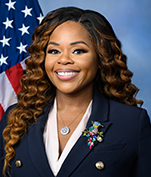

Nominee	Sheila Cherfilus-McCormick	Drew Montez Clark
Party	Democratic	Republican
Popular vote	136,215	52,151
Percentage	72.31%	27.69%
- Cherfilus-McCormick: 50–60% 60–70% 70–80% 80–90% >90% Clark: 50–60% 60–70% 70–80% >90% No votes
U.S. Representative before election
Sheila Cherfilus-McCormick
Democratic
Elected U.S. Representative
Sheila Cherfilus-McCormick
Democratic

Democrat Alcee Hastings, who represented the district since 1993, was re-elected with 78% of the vote in 2020. After Hastings died on April 6, 2021, a special election was held on January 11, 2022, to succeed him, which was won by Sheila Cherfilus-McCormick. Cherfilus-McCormick won re-election in 2022.

=== Democratic primary ===
==== Candidates ====
===== Nominee =====
- Sheila Cherfilus-McCormick, incumbent U.S. representative

===== Eliminated in primary =====
- Dale Holness, former mayor of Broward County and candidate for this district in the 2022 special election
- Anika Omphroy, state representative

===== Declined =====
- Bobby DuBose, former minority leader of the Florida House of Representatives and candidate for this district in the 2022 special election
- Omari Hardy, former state representative and candidate for this district in the 2022 special election
- Barbara Sharief, former mayor of Broward County and candidate for this district in the 2022 special election (running for state senate; endorsed Cherfilus-McCormick)
- Perry Thurston, former state senator and candidate for this district in the 2022 special election

==== Polling ====
Poll source	Date(s) administered	Sample size	Margin of error	Sheila Cherfilus-McCormick	Dale Holness	Undecided
RMG Research	June 4–9, 2022	500 (LV)	± 4.5%	45%	21%	34%

=== Endorsements ===
Sheila Cherfilus-McCormick

Local officials

- Barbara Sharief, mayor of Broward County (2016–2017) and candidate for this seat in the 2022 special election

Organizations

- Brand New Congress
- The Dolphin Democrats
- Sierra Club

Labor unions

- 1199SEIU United Healthcare Workers East
- AFSCME Florida
- Service Employees International Union Florida

Newspapers

- The Palm Beach Post
- Sun-Sentinel

==== Results ====
Democratic primary results
Party	Candidate	Votes	%
Democratic	Sheila Cherfilus-McCormick (incumbent)	47,601	65.6
Democratic	Dale Holness	20,783	28.6
Democratic	Anika Omphroy	4,197	5.8
Total votes		72,581	100.0

=== Republican primary ===
==== Candidates ====
===== Nominee =====
- Dr. Drew Montez Clark, businessman

=== General election ===
==== Predictions ====
Source	Ranking	As of
The Cook Political Report	Solid D	April 25, 2022
Inside Elections	Solid D	May 17, 2022
Sabato's Crystal Ball	Safe D	April 27, 2022
Politico	Solid D	April 28, 2022
RCP	Safe D	June 9, 2022
Fox News	Solid D	July 11, 2022
DDHQ	Solid D	July 20, 2022
538	Solid D	June 30, 2022
The Economist	Safe D	September 28, 2022

==== Results ====
Florida's 20th congressional district, 2022
Party	Candidate	Votes	%
Democratic	Sheila Cherfilus-McCormick (incumbent)	136,215	72.3
Republican	Drew Montez Clark	52,151	27.7
Total votes		188,366	100.0
Democratic hold			

== District 21 ==
2022 Florida's 21st congressional district election
- November 8, 2022
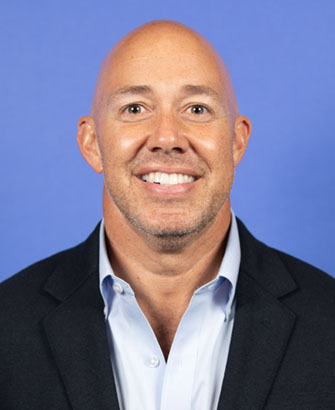

Nominee	Brian Mast	Corinna Robinson
Party	Republican	Democratic
Popular vote	208,614	119,891
Percentage	63.5%	36.5%
- Mast: 50–60% 60–70% 70–80% 80–90% >90% Robinson: 50–60% 60–70% 70–80% 80–90% >90% Tie: 50–60% No votes
U.S. Representative before election
Brian Mast
Republican
Elected U.S. Representative
Brian Mast
Republican

Republican Brian Mast, who had represented the district since 2017, was re-elected with 56% of the vote in 2020. Mast won re-election in 2022.

The boundaries of the district were redrawn from 2020, determined by the 2020 redistricting cycle.

=== Republican primary ===
==== Candidates ====
===== Nominee =====
- Brian Mast, incumbent U.S. representative

===== Eliminated in primary =====
- Jeff Buongiorno, former deputy sheriff
- Melissa Martz, attorney
- Ljubo Skrbic, doctor

==== Results ====
Republican primary results
Party	Candidate	Votes	%
Republican	Brian Mast (incumbent)	56,535	78.1
Republican	Jeff Buongiorno	8,850	12.2
Republican	Melissa Martz	6,186	8.5
Republican	Ljubo Skrbic	853	1.2
Total votes		72,424	100.0

=== Democratic primary ===
==== Candidates ====
===== Nominee =====
- Corinna Robinson

=== General election ===
==== Predictions ====
Source	Ranking	As of
The Cook Political Report	Solid R	April 25, 2022
Inside Elections	Solid R	May 17, 2022
Sabato's Crystal Ball	Safe R	April 27, 2022
Politico	Solid R	April 28, 2022
RCP	Safe R	June 9, 2022
Fox News	Solid R	July 11, 2022
DDHQ	Solid R	July 20, 2022
538	Solid R	June 30, 2022
The Economist	Safe R	September 28, 2022

==== Results ====
Florida's 21st congressional district, 2022
Party	Candidate	Votes	%
Republican	Brian Mast (incumbent)	208,614	63.5
Democratic	Corinna Robinson	119,891	36.5
Total votes		328,505	100.0
Republican hold			

== District 22 ==
2022 Florida's 22nd congressional district election
- November 8, 2022
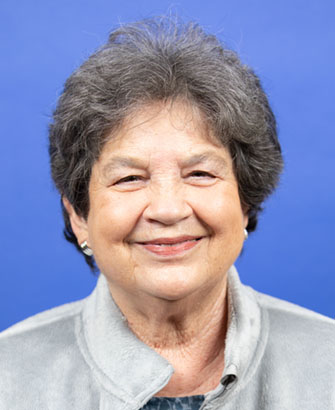

Nominee	Lois Frankel	Dan Franzese
Party	Democratic	Republican
Popular vote	150,010	122,194
Percentage	55.11%	44.89%
- Precinct results Frankel: 50–60% 60–70% 70–80% 80–90% >90% Franzese: 50–60% 60–70% 70–80% 80–90% >90% Tie: 50–60% No votes
U.S. Representative before election
Lois Frankel
Democratic
Elected U.S. Representative
Lois Frankel
Democratic

Democrat Lois Frankel, who had represented the district since 2013, was re-elected with 59% of the vote in 2020. Frankel won re-election in 2022.

The boundaries of the district were redrawn from 2020, determined by the 2020 redistricting cycle.

=== Democratic primary ===
==== Candidates ====
===== Nominee =====
- Lois Frankel, incumbent U.S. representative

===== Endorsements =====
Lois Frankel

Organizations

- Feminist Majority PAC
- NARAL Pro-Choice America
- Planned Parenthood Action Fund
- Pro-Israel America
- Sierra Club

Labor unions

- AFSCME Florida
- Service Employees International Union

=== Republican primary ===
==== Candidates ====
===== Nominee =====
- Daniel John Franzese

===== Eliminated in primary =====
- Deborah Adeimy
- Peter Arianas
- Rod Dorilás, Navy veteran
- Carrie Lawlor

===== Declined =====
- Laura Loomer, reporter for InfoWars, far-right activist, and nominee for this district in 2020 (running in the 11th district)

==== Endorsements ====
Deborah Adeimy

Newspapers

- The Palm Beach Post

==== Results ====
Republican primary results
Party	Candidate	Votes	%
Republican	Dan Franzese	11,972	34.7
Republican	Deborah Adeimy	11,842	34.3
Republican	Rod Dorilas	6,594	19.1
Republican	Peter Steven Arianas	2,082	6.0
Republican	Carrie Lawlor	2,055	6.0
Total votes		34,503	100.0

=== General election ===
==== Predictions ====
Source	Ranking	As of
The Cook Political Report	Solid D	April 25, 2022
Inside Elections	Solid D	May 17, 2022
Sabato's Crystal Ball	Safe D	April 27, 2022
Politico	Likely D	October 18, 2022
RCP	Likely D	June 9, 2022
Fox News	Likely D	July 11, 2022
DDHQ	Solid D	July 20, 2022
538	Solid D	June 30, 2022
The Economist	Safe D	September 28, 2022

==== Results ====
Florida's 22nd congressional district, 2022
Party	Candidate	Votes	%
Democratic	Lois Frankel (incumbent)	150,010	55.1
Republican	Dan Franzese	122,194	44.9
Total votes		272,204	100.0
Democratic hold			

== District 23 ==
2022 Florida's 23rd congressional district election
- November 8, 2022
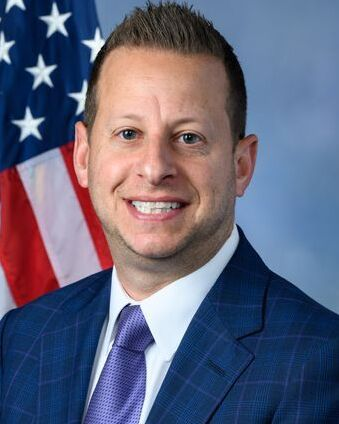

Nominee	Jared Moskowitz	Joe Budd
Party	Democratic	Republican
Popular vote	143,951	130,681
Percentage	51.59%	46.83%
- Moskowitz: 40–50% 50–60% 60–70% 70–80% 80–90% Budd: 40–50% 50–60% 60–70% 70–80%
U.S. Representative before election
Ted Deutch
Democratic
Elected U.S. Representative
Jared Moskowitz
Democratic

Democrat Ted Deutch, who had represented the district since 2010, was re-elected with 58% of the vote in 2020. On February 28, 2022, he announced he would leave Congress to become CEO of the American Jewish Committee. Deutch resigned early on September 30, 2022.

The boundaries of the district were redrawn from 2020, determined by the 2020 redistricting cycle.

=== Democratic primary ===
==== Candidates ====
===== Nominee =====
- Jared Moskowitz, Broward County commissioner, former director of the Florida Division of Emergency Management, and former state representative

===== Eliminated in primary =====
- Allen Ellison, political consultant and nominee for FL-17 in 2018 and 2020
- Michaelangelo Hamilton
- Hava Holzhauer, former Anti-Defamation League Florida regional director
- Ben Sorensen, Fort Lauderdale city commissioner and vice mayor
- Michael Trout, perennial candidate

===== Withdrawn =====
- Curtis Calabrese, commercial airline pilot and naval air combat veteran
- Imtiaz Mohammad

===== Declined =====
- Dave Aronberg, Palm Beach County state attorney and former state senator
- Mark Bogen, Broward County commissioner
- Lauren Book, minority leader of the Florida Senate
- Ted Deutch, incumbent U.S. representative
- Gary Farmer, state senator and former minority leader of the Florida Senate (currently running for Florida's 17th circuit court)
- Fred Guttenberg, gun-control activist (endorsed Moskowitz)
- Chad Klitzman, former Obama staffer
- Tina Polsky, state senator (endorsed Moskowitz)
- Dean Trantalis, mayor of Fort Lauderdale

==== Endorsements ====
Ted Deutch (declined)

Organizations

- Planned Parenthood Action Fund
- Pro-Israel America
- Sierra Club
Jared Moskowitz

Executive branch officials

- Hillary Clinton, former United States Secretary of State (2009–2013), former U.S. senator from New York (2001–2009), former First Lady of the United States (1993–2001)

U.S. representatives

- Hakeem Jeffries, U.S. representative for New York's 8th congressional district (2013–)
- Patrick Murphy, former U.S. representative for Florida's 18th congressional district (2013–2017)
- Joe Neguse, U.S. representative from Colorado's 2nd congressional district (2019–)
- Donna Shalala, former U.S. representative for Florida's 27th congressional district (2019–2021)
- Larry Smith, former U.S. representative for Florida's 16th congressional district
- Robert Wexler, former U.S. representative for Florida's 19th congressional district

State officials

- Bob Butterworth, former Florida attorney general (1987–2002)
- Alex Sink, former Florida chief financial officer (2007–2011) and Democratic nominee for governor in 2010

State legislators

- Loranne Ausley, state senator
- Robin Bartleman, state representative
- Janet Cruz, state senator
- Dan Daley, state representative
- Ben Diamond, state representative
- Anna Eskamani, state representative
- Joe Geller, state representative
- Michael Gottlieb, state representative
- Christine Hunschofsky, state representative
- Evan Jenne, minority leader of the house of representatives
- Shevrin Jones, state senator
- Rosalind Osgood, state senator
- Jason Pizzo, state senator
- Tina Polsky, state senator
- Bobby Powell, state senator
- Kevin Rader, state representative
- Michele Rayner, state representative
- David Silvers, former state representative
- Irving Slosberg, former state representative
- Carlos Guillermo Smith, state representative
- Eleanor Sobel, former state senator
- Richard Stark, state representative

Local officials

- Dave Aronberg, Palm Beach County state attorney
- Antonio Arserio, Margate mayor
- Mack Bernard, Palm Beach County commissioner
- Mark Bogen, Broward County commissioner
- Jane Bolin, Oakland Park commissioner and former mayor
- Mike Bracchi, Wilton Manors commissioner
- Ric Bradshaw, Palm Beach County sheriff
- Scott Brook, Coral Springs
- Daniella Levine Cava, mayor of Miami-Dade County
- Debbie Eisinger, former Cooper City mayor
- Bill Ganz, Deerfield Beach, mayor
- Dan Gelber, mayor of Miami Beach
- Steven Geller, Broward County commissioner
- Rex Hardin, Pompano Beach mayor
- Denise Horland, Plantation city councilwoman
- Rachelle Litt, Palm Beach Gardens vice mayor
- Melissa McKinlay, Palm Beach County commissioner
- Judy Paul, Davie mayor
- Harold Pryor, Broward County state attorney
- Nan Rich, Broward County commissioner
- Mike Ryan, mayor of Sunrise
- Maria Sachs, Palm Beach County commissioner
- Scott Singer, Boca Raton mayor
- Deborah Tarrant, Hillsboro Beach, mayor
- Perry Thurston, former state senator
- Gregory Tony, Broward County sheriff
- Becky Tooley, Coconut Creek mayor
- Rich Walker, Parkland mayor
- Robert Weinroth, Palm Beach County mayor

Individuals

- Lori Alhadeff, gun-control activist
- Fred Guttenberg, gun-control activist

Labor unions

- 1199SEIU United Healthcare Workers East
- American Federation of Teachers
- Communication Workers of America
- Florida Education Association
- National Education Association
- Service Employees International Union Florida

Organizations

- League of Conservation Voters
- Protect Our Future
- Sierra Club

Newspapers

- The Palm Beach Post
- Sun-Sentinel
Ben Sorensen

U.S. representatives

- Patrick Murphy, former U.S. representative from Florida's 18th congressional district (2013–2017)

Local officials

- Kevin Biederman, Hollywood commissioner
- Anthony Caggiano, vice mayor of Margate
- Chris Caputo, Wilton Manors commissioner
- Julia Carson, former Wilton Manors commissioner
- Mike Gelin, vice mayor of Tamarac
- Steve Glassman, Fort Lauderdale commissioner
- Bobbie Grace, former Dania Beach mayor
- Mitch Rosenwald, Oakland Park commissioner
- Caryl Shuham, Hollywood commissioner

Organizations

- VoteVets

Labor unions

- International Union of Painters and Allied Trades

==== Results ====
Democratic primary results
Party	Candidate	Votes	%
Democratic	Jared Moskowitz	38,822	61.1
Democratic	Ben Sorensen	13,012	20.5
Democratic	Hava Holzhauer	5,276	8.3
Democratic	Allen Ellison	3,960	6.2
Democratic	Mike Trout	1,390	2.2
Democratic	Michaelangelo Collins Hamilton	1,064	1.7
Total votes		63,524	100.0

=== Republican primary ===
==== Candidates ====
===== Nominee =====
- Joe Budd, entrepreneur

===== Eliminated in primary =====
- Steve Chess, retired chiropractor
- Christy McLaughlin, candidate for FL-23 in 2020
- Myles Perrone
- James Pruden, attorney and nominee for this district in 2020
- Darlene Swaffar, insurance agent and candidate for this district in 2020
- Ira Weinstein

===== Declined =====
- Chip LaMarca, state representative (ran for re-election)
- George Moraitis, former state representative

==== Endorsements ====
James Pruden

Newspapers

- The Palm Beach Post (primary only)

==== Results ====
Republican primary results
Party	Candidate	Votes	%
Republican	Joe Budd	12,592	37.6
Republican	Jim Pruden	7,399	22.1
Republican	Darlene Cerezo Swaffar	3,872	11.6
Republican	Christy McLaughlin	3,832	11.5
Republican	Steven Chess	2,840	8.5
Republican	Ira Weinstein	2,297	6.9
Republican	Myles Perrone	639	1.9
Total votes		33,471	100.0

=== Independent and third-party candidates ===
==== Independents ====
===== Declared =====
- Mark Napier, former CIA officer
- Christine Scott

=== General election ===
==== Predictions ====
Source	Ranking	As of
The Cook Political Report	Solid D	April 25, 2022
Inside Elections	Solid D	May 17, 2022
Sabato's Crystal Ball	Likely D	November 2, 2022
Politico	Likely D	April 28, 2022
RCP	Lean D	June 9, 2022
Fox News	Likely D	July 11, 2022
DDHQ	Solid D	July 20, 2022
538	Likely D	October 20, 2022
The Economist	Safe D	September 28, 2022

==== Results ====
Florida's 23rd congressional district, 2022
Party	Candidate	Votes	%
Democratic	Jared Moskowitz	143,951	51.6
Republican	Joe Budd	130,681	46.8
Independent	Christine Scott	3,079	1.1
Independent	Mark Napier	1,338	0.5
Total votes		279,049	100.0
Democratic hold			

== District 24 ==
2022 Florida's 24th congressional district election
- November 8, 2022
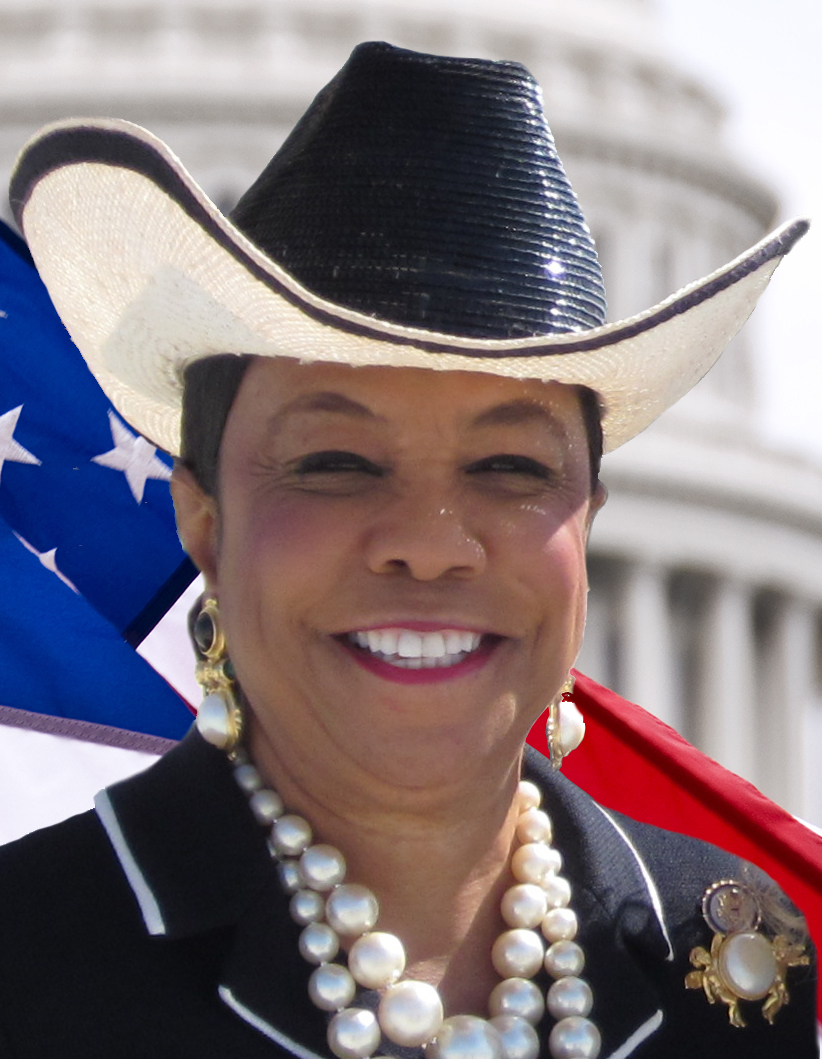

Nominee	Frederica Wilson	Jesus Navarro
Party	Democratic	Republican
Popular vote	133,442	52,449
Percentage	71.79%	28.21%
- Wilson: 50–60% 60–70% 70–80% 80–90%% >90% Navarro: 50–60% 60–70% 70–80% 80–90% >90% No votes
U.S. Representative before election
Frederica Wilson
Democratic
Elected U.S. Representative
Frederica Wilson
Democratic

Democrat Frederica Wilson, who had represented the district since 2011, was re-elected with 76% of the vote in 2020. Wilson won re-election in 2022.

The boundaries of the district were redrawn from 2020, determined by the 2020 redistricting cycle.

=== Democratic primary ===
==== Candidates ====
===== Nominee =====
- Frederica Wilson, incumbent U.S. representative

===== Eliminated in primary =====
- Kevin Harris, first responder

==== Endorsements ====
Frederica Wilson

State legislators

- Shevrin Jones, state senator

Organizations

- Feminist Majority PAC
- Planned Parenthood Action Fund
- Sierra Club

Labor unions

- 1199SEIU United Healthcare Workers East
- AFSCME Florida
- Service Employees International Union Florida

Newspapers

- Miami Herald

==== Results ====
Democratic primary results
Party	Candidate	Votes	%
Democratic	Frederica Wilson (incumbent)	56,776	89.3
Democratic	Kevin Harris	6,816	10.7
Total votes		63,592	100.0

=== Republican primary ===
==== Candidates ====
===== Nominee =====
- Jesus Navarro

===== Eliminated in primary =====
- Lavern Spicer, nonprofit executive and nominee for this district in 2020

===== Declined =====
- Patricia Gonzalez

==== Endorsements ====
Lavern Spicer

Newspapers

- Miami Herald

==== Results ====
Republican primary results
Party	Candidate	Votes	%
Republican	Jesus Navarro	6,373	64.5
Republican	Lavern Spicer	3,506	35.5
Total votes		9,879	100.0

=== General election ===
==== Predictions ====
Source	Ranking	As of
The Cook Political Report	Solid D	April 25, 2022
Inside Elections	Solid D	May 17, 2022
Sabato's Crystal Ball	Safe D	April 27, 2022
Politico	Solid D	April 28, 2022
RCP	Safe D	June 9, 2022
Fox News	Solid D	July 11, 2022
DDHQ	Solid D	July 20, 2022
538	Solid D	June 30, 2022
The Economist	Safe D	September 28, 2022

==== Results ====
Florida's 24th congressional district, 2022
Party	Candidate	Votes	%
Democratic	Frederica Wilson (incumbent)	133,442	71.8
Republican	Jesus Navarro	52,449	28.2
Total votes		185,891	100.0
Democratic hold			

== District 25 ==
2022 Florida's 25th congressional district election
- November 8, 2022
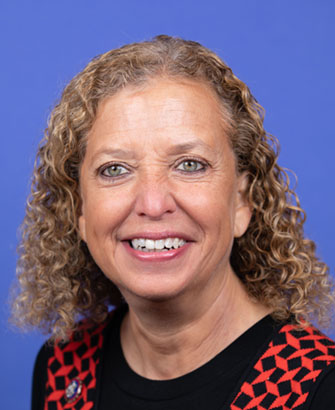

Nominee	Debbie Wasserman Schultz	Carla Spalding
Party	Democratic	Republican
Popular vote	129,113	105,239
Percentage	55.09%	44.91%
- Precinct results Wasserman Schultz: 50–60% 60–70% 70–80% 80–90%% >90% Spalding: 50–60% 60–70% 70–80% No data
U.S. Representative before election
Debbie Wasserman Schultz
Democratic
Elected U.S. Representative
Debbie Wasserman Schultz
Democratic

Democrat Debbie Wasserman Schultz, who had represented the district since 2005, was re-elected with 58% of the vote in 2020. Wasserman Schultz won re-election in 2022.

The boundaries of the district were redrawn from 2020, determined by the 2020 redistricting cycle.

=== Democratic primary ===
==== Candidates ====
===== Nominee =====
- Debbie Wasserman Schultz, incumbent U.S. representative

===== Eliminated in primary =====
- Robert Millwee

==== Endorsements ====
Debbie Wasserman Schultz

Organizations

- Feminist Majority PAC
- League of Conservation Voters
- Planned Parenthood Action Fund
- Pro-Israel America
- Sierra Club

Labor unions

- AFSCME Florida
- Service Employees International Union

Newspapers

- Sun-Sentinel

==== Results ====
Democratic primary results
Party	Candidate	Votes	%
Democratic	Debbie Wasserman Schultz (incumbent)	50,554	89.0
Democratic	Robert Millwee	6,241	11.0
Total votes		56,795	100.0

=== Republican primary ===
==== Candidates ====
===== Nominee =====
- Carla Spalding, nurse, Independent candidate for the 18th district in 2016, candidate for this district in 2018, and nominee in 2020

===== Eliminated in primary =====
- Rubin Young

==== Endorsements ====
Carla Spalding

Individuals

- Michael Flynn, retired United States Army lieutenant general and the 24th U.S. National Security Advisor

==== Results ====
Republican primary results
Party	Candidate	Votes	%
Republican	Carla Spalding	16,425	71.6
Republican	Rubin Young	6,511	28.4
Total votes		22,936	100.0

=== General election ===
==== Predictions ====
Source	Ranking	As of
The Cook Political Report	Solid D	April 25, 2022
Inside Elections	Solid D	May 17, 2022
Sabato's Crystal Ball	Safe D	April 27, 2022
Politico	Solid D	April 28, 2022
RCP	Safe D	June 9, 2022
Fox News	Solid D	July 11, 2022
DDHQ	Solid D	July 20, 2022
538	Solid D	June 30, 2022
The Economist	Safe D	September 28, 2022

==== Results ====
Florida's 25th congressional district, 2022
Party	Candidate	Votes	%
Democratic	Debbie Wasserman Schultz (incumbent)	129,113	55.1
Republican	Carla Spalding	105,239	44.9
Total votes		234,352	100.0
Democratic hold			

== District 26 ==
2022 Florida's 26th congressional district election
- November 8, 2022
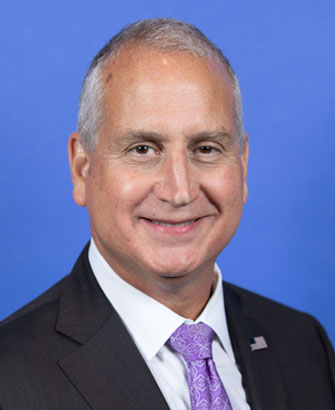

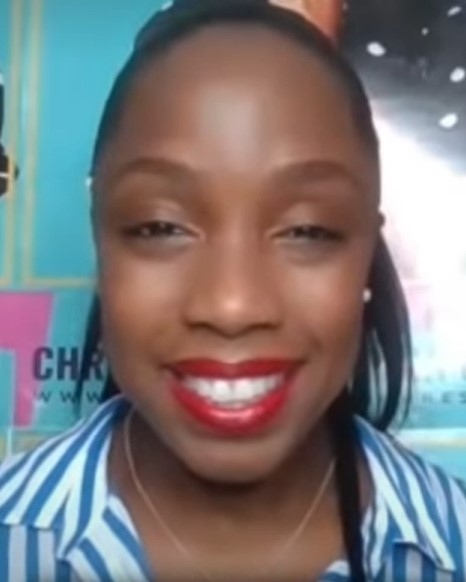
Nominee	Mario Díaz-Balart	Christine Olivo
Party	Republican	Democratic
Popular vote	143,240	58,868
Percentage	70.87%	29.13%
- Díaz-Balart: 50–60% 60–70% 70–80% 80–90% >90% Olivo: 50–60% 60–70% 70–80% 80–90% >90% Tie: 50% No votes
U.S. Representative before election
Mario Díaz-Balart
Republican
Elected U.S. Representative
Mario Díaz-Balart
Republican

Republican Mario Díaz-Balart, who had represented the district since 2003, was unopposed in 2020. Díaz-Balart won re-election in 2022.

The boundaries of the district were redrawn from 2020, determined by the 2020 redistricting cycle.

=== Republican primary ===
==== Candidates ====
===== Nominee =====
- Mario Díaz-Balart, incumbent U.S. representative

===== Eliminated in primary =====
- Darren Aquino

===== Endorsements =====
Mario Díaz-Balart

Executive branch officials

- Donald Trump, 45th president of the United States (2017–2021)

==== Results ====
Republican primary results
Party	Candidate	Votes	%
Republican	Mario Díaz-Balart (incumbent)	36,861	84.3
Republican	Darren Aquino	6,885	15.7
Total votes		43,746	100.0

=== Democratic primary ===
==== Candidates ====
===== Nominee =====
- Christine Olivo

===== Withdrew =====
- Adam Gentle (running for FL State House)

==== Endorsements ====
Christine Olivo

Individuals

- Marianne Williamson, author and candidate for the Democratic nomination for President of the United States in 2020

=== General election ===
==== Predictions ====
Source	Ranking	As of
The Cook Political Report	Solid R	April 25, 2022
Inside Elections	Solid R	May 17, 2022
Sabato's Crystal Ball	Safe R	April 27, 2022
Politico	Solid R	April 28, 2022
RCP	Safe R	June 9, 2022
Fox News	Solid R	July 11, 2022
DDHQ	Solid R	July 20, 2022
538	Solid R	June 30, 2022
The Economist	Safe R	September 28, 2022

==== Results ====
Florida's 26th congressional district, 2022
Party	Candidate	Votes	%
Republican	Mario Díaz-Balart (incumbent)	143,240	70.9
Democratic	Christine Olivo	58,868	29.1
Total votes		202,108	100.0
Republican hold			

== District 27 ==
2022 Florida's 27th congressional district election
- November 8, 2022
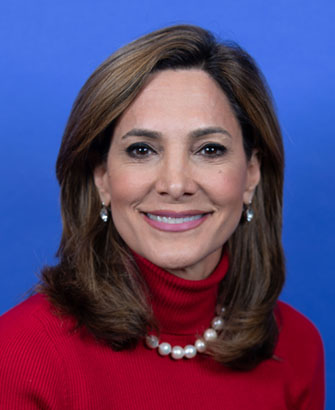

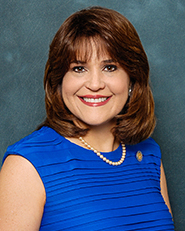
Nominee	María Elvira Salazar	Annette Taddeo
Party	Republican	Democratic
Popular vote	136,038	101,404
Percentage	57.29%	42.71%
- Precinct results Salazar: 50–60% 60–70% 70–80% 80–90% >90% Taddeo: 50–60% 60–70% 70–80% 80–90% >90% Tie: 50% No votes
U.S. Representative before election
Maria Elvira Salazar
Republican
Elected U.S. Representative
Maria Elvira Salazar
Republican

Republican Maria Elvira Salazar, who had represented the district since 2021, flipped the district and was elected with 51% of the vote in 2020. Salazar won re-election in 2022.

The boundaries of the district were redrawn from 2020, as determined by the 2020 redistricting cycle. Miami Beach was removed from the 27th, while the district took in more Cuban-heavy areas inland.

This district was included on the list of Republican-held seats the Democratic Congressional Campaign Committee was targeting in 2022.

=== Republican primary ===
==== Candidates ====
===== Nominee =====
- Maria Elvira Salazar, incumbent U.S. representative

===== Eliminated in primary =====
- Frank Polo

==== Endorsements ====
Maria Elvira Salazar

Federal officials

- Tim Scott, U.S. senator from South Carolina

Organizations

- Maggie's List
- Republican Jewish Coalition
- Turning Point Action
- Winning for Women
Declined to endorse

Newspapers

- Miami Herald

==== Results ====
Republican primary results
Party	Candidate	Votes	%
Republican	Maria Elvira Salazar (incumbent)	33,760	80.8
Republican	Frank Polo	8,023	19.2
Total votes		41,783	100.0

=== Democratic primary ===
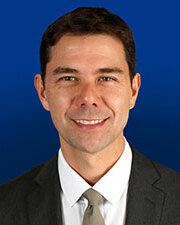
Miami City Commissioner Ken Russell finished second in the primary

==== Candidates ====
===== Nominee =====
- Annette Taddeo, state senator, nominee for FL-18 in 2008 and for lieutenant governor in 2014, and candidate for FL-26 in 2016 (previously ran for Governor)

===== Eliminated in primary =====
- Angel Montalvo, progressive activist
- Ken Russell, Miami City Commissioner

===== Withdrawn =====
- Eileen Higgins, Miami-Dade County commissioner
- Janelle Perez, co-owner of Doctors Healthcare Plans Inc., a medicare managed–care company, and former Republican staffer for U.S. House Committee on Foreign Affairs (running for SD-37)

===== Declined =====
- Debbie Mucarsel-Powell, former U.S. representative for the 26th district
- Donna Shalala, former U.S. representative (endorsed Taddeo)

==== Endorsements ====
Ken Russell

U.S. representatives

- Patrick Murphy, former U.S. representative for Florida's 18th congressional district

State legislators

- Juan-Carlos Planas, former Republican state representative (Independent)

Local officials

- Bob Best, Miami springs city councilman
- Richard Coriat, Cutler Bay city councilman
- Jessica Cosden, Cape Coral city councilwoman
- John E. Dailey, mayor of Tallahassee
- Daniel Dietch, former mayor of Surfside
- Jean Ahearn Koch, Sarasota city commissioner
- Rick Kriseman, former mayor of St. Petersburg
- Brent Latham, mayor of North Bay Village
- Merritt Matheson, mayor of Stuart
- Bernie Parness, Deerfield Beach commissioner
- ~~Philip Stoddard, former mayor of South Miami~~ (switched endorsement to Taddeo)
- Rachel Streitfeld, North Bay Village commissioner
- Dean Trantalis, mayor of Fort Lauderdale

Individuals

- Udonis Haslem, basketball player for the Miami Heat

Labor unions

- American Federation of State, County and Municipal Employees Local 1907
- International Association of Fire Fighters Local 587
- International Brotherhood of Electrical Workers Local 349
- International Brotherhood of Teamsters Local 769
- Unite Here Local 355
Annette Taddeo

U.S. representatives

- Kathy Castor, congresswoman for Florida's 14th congressional district
- Charlie Crist, congressman for Florida's 13th congressional district
- Lois Frankel, congresswoman for Florida's 21st congressional district
- Ruben Gallego, congressman for Arizona's 7th congressional district
- Steny Hoyer, congressman for Maryland's 5th congressional district and as House Majority Leader (2007–2011; 2019–present)
- Donna Shalala, former congresswoman for this district (2019–2021)
- Debbie Wasserman Schultz, congresswoman for Florida's 23rd congressional district

State legislators

- Shevrin Jones, state senator
- Andrew Learned, state representative

Local officials

- Alix Desulme, vice mayor of North Miami
- Katie Saint Fleur, Miami Shores village councilmember
- Dan Gelber, mayor of Miami Beach
- Michael Gongora, Miami Beach city commissioner
- Paul Hernandez, former Hialeah city councilmember
- Eileen Higgins, Miami-Dade County commissioner
- Anna Hockhammer,Pinecrest village councilmember
- Cindy Lerner, former mayor of Pinecrest
- Josh Liebman, South Miami city commissioner
- Joy Malekoff, Miami Beach city commissioner
- James McDonald, former Pinecrest village councilmember
- Kionne McGhee, Miami-Dade County commissioner
- Gladys Mezrahi, Aventura city councilmember
- Jean Monestime, Miami-Dade County commissioner
- Sally Phillips, mayor of South Miami
- Shannon del Prado, Pinecrest village councilmember
- Micky Steinberg, Miami-Dade County commissioner-elect
- Phillip Stoddard, former mayor of South Miami (previously endorsed Russell)
- Leanne Tellam, vice mayor of South Miami
- Raul Valdes-Fauli, former mayor of Coral Gables

Individuals

- Al Cárdenas, former chair of the Florida Republican Party (Republican)

Organizations

- Congressional Hispanic Caucus BOLD PAC
- EMILY's List
- Giffords PAC
- League of Conservation Voters
- NARAL Pro-Choice America
- Planned Parenthood
- Sierra Club

Labor unions

- 1199SEIU United Healthcare Workers East
- AFSCME Florida
- Communications Workers of America
- National Education Association
- Plumbers Local 519
- Service Employees International Union Florida
- Transport Workers Union of America Local 291

Newspapers

- Miami Herald

==== Polling ====
Poll source	Date(s) administered	Sample size	Margin of error	Angel Montalvo	Ken Russell	Annette Taddeo	Undecided
SEA Polling & Strategic Design (D) (Note: This poll was sponsored by Taddeo's campaign.)	June 22–25, 2022	400 (LV)	± 4.9%	1%	15%	51%	33%

Hypothetical polling

Poll source	Date(s) administered	Sample size	Margin of error	Debbie Mucarsel-Powell	Janelle Perez	David Richardson	Donna Shalala	Undecided
Public Policy Polling (D) (Note: Poll conducted for an undisclosed Democratic group)	August 20–22, 2021	593 (LV)	± 4.0%	20%	4%	7%	28%	41%

==== Results ====
Democratic primary results
Party	Candidate	Votes	%
Democratic	Annette Taddeo	27,015	67.8
Democratic	Ken Russell	10,337	25.9
Democratic	Angel Montalvo	2,493	6.3
Total votes		39,845	100.0

=== Independents ===
==== Candidates ====
===== Declared =====
- Ian Medina

=== General election ===
==== Predictions ====
Source	Ranking	As of
The Cook Political Report	Likely R	November 7, 2022
Inside Elections	Likely R	May 17, 2022
Sabato's Crystal Ball	Likely R	April 27, 2022
Politico	Lean R	October 3, 2022
RCP	Likely R	June 9, 2022
Fox News	Likely R	July 11, 2022
DDHQ	Likely R	October 7, 2022
538	Likely R	August 1, 2022
The Economist	Tossup	September 28, 2022

==== Polling ====
Graphical summary

Poll source	Date(s) administered	Sample size	Margin of error	María Elvira Salazar (R)	Annette Taddeo (D)	Undecided
Cygnal (R) (Note: Poll sponsored by Leadership for a Strong America PAC, which supports Salazar)	October 9–11, 2022	300 (LV)	± 6.0%	50%	44%	6%
SEA Polling & Strategic Design (D)	October 3–5, 2022	400 (LV)	± 4.9%	46%	47%	7%
Alvarado Strategies (R)	July 26–29, 2022	440 (LV)	± 4.7%	39%	34%	27%
SEA Polling & Strategic Design (D)	May 23–26, 2022	400 (RV)	± 4.9%	47%	45%	8%

Hypothetical polling

María Elvira Salazar vs. Ken Russell

Poll source	Date(s) administered	Sample size	Margin of error	María Elvira Salazar (R)	Ken Russell (D)	Other	Undecided
RMG Research	July 31 – August 6, 2022	400 (LV)	± 4.9%	44%	37%	7%	12%
The Kitchens Group (D) (Note: Poll sponsored by Russell's campaign)	April 18–21, 2022	350 (LV)	± 5.2%	43%	41%	–	16%

==== Results ====
Florida's 27th congressional district, 2022
Party	Candidate	Votes	%
Republican	Maria Elvira Salazar (incumbent)	136,038	57.3
Democratic	Annette Taddeo	101,404	42.7
Total votes		237,442	100.0
Republican hold			

== District 28 ==
2022 Florida's 28th congressional district election
- November 8, 2022
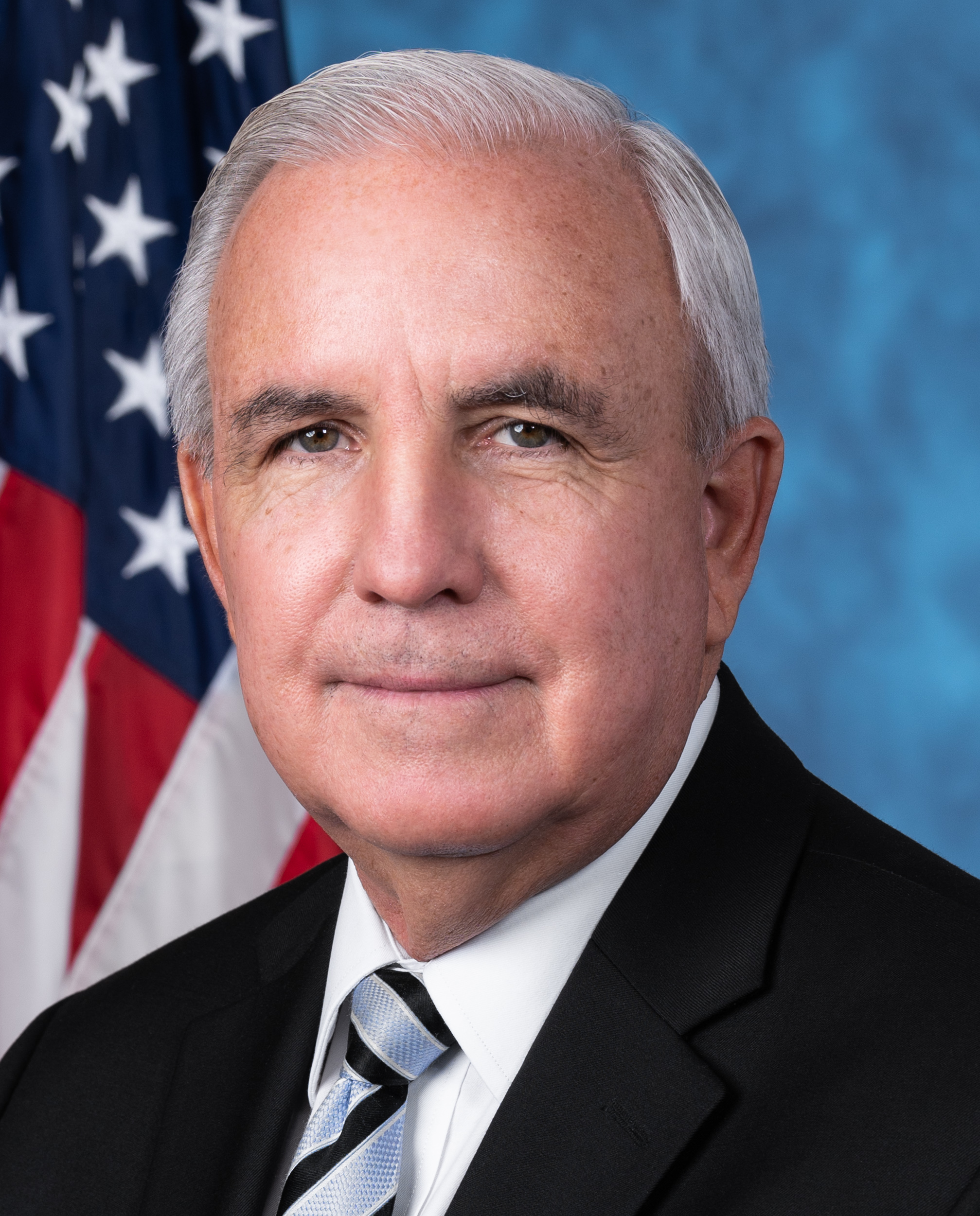

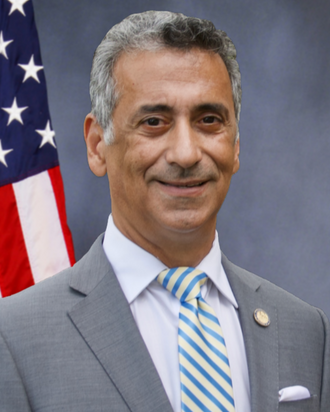
Nominee	Carlos Gimenez	Robert Asencio
Party	Republican	Democratic
Popular vote	134,457	76,665
Percentage	63.69%	36.31%
- Gimenez: 50–60% 60–70% 70–80% 80–90% >90% Asencio: 50–60% 60–70% 70–80% 80–90% >90% Tie: 40–50% No votes
U.S. Representative before election
Carlos Giménez
Republican
Elected U.S. Representative
Carlos Gimenez
Republican

Republican Carlos Giménez, who had represented the 26th district since 2021, flipped that district and was elected with 52% of the vote in 2020. Giménez won re-election in the new 28th district in 2022.

The boundaries of the district were redrawn from 2020, determined by the 2020 redistricting cycle.

This district was included on the list of Republican-held seats the Democratic Congressional Campaign Committee was targeting in 2022.

=== Republican primary ===
==== Candidates ====
===== Nominee =====
- Carlos Giménez, incumbent U.S. representative

===== Eliminated in primary =====
- Carlos Garin
- KW Miller

===== Endorsements =====
Carlos A. Giménez

Executive branch officials

- Donald Trump, 45th president of the United States (2017–2021)

Organizations

- Republican Jewish Coalition
Declined to endorse

Newspapers

- Miami Herald

==== Results ====
Republican primary results
Party	Candidate	Votes	%
Republican	Carlos Giménez (incumbent)	28,762	73.4
Republican	Carlos Garin	6,048	15.4
Republican	KW Miller	4,395	11.2
Total votes		39,205	100.0

=== Democratic primary ===
==== Candidates ====
===== Nominee =====
- Robert Asencio, former state representative and former captain of the Miami-Dade Schools Police Department

===== Eliminated in primary =====
- Juan Parades

===== Declined =====
- Debbie Mucarsel-Powell, former U.S. representative
- David Richardson, Miami Beach commissioner

===== Endorsements =====
Robert Asencio

U.S. representatives

- Charlie Crist, former U.S. representative for Florida's 13th congressional district (2017–2022)

Organizations

- Congressional Hispanic Caucus BOLD PAC

Labor unions

- AFL–CIO
- AFSCME Florida
- Communications Workers of America
- International Brotherhood of Electrical Workers Local 349
- International Union of Operating Engineers
- Office and Professional Employees International Union
- Transport Workers Union of America

Newspapers

- Miami Herald

==== Results ====
Democratic primary results
Party	Candidate	Votes	%
Democratic	Robert Asencio	18,504	69.3
Democratic	Juan Parades	8,217	30.8
Total votes		26,721	100.0

=== General election ===
==== Predictions ====
Source	Ranking	As of
The Cook Political Report	Solid R	April 25, 2022
Inside Elections	Solid R	May 17, 2022
Sabato's Crystal Ball	Safe R	July 28, 2022
Politico	Likely R	April 28, 2022
RCP	Likely R	June 9, 2022
Fox News	Solid R	July 11, 2022
DDHQ	Solid R	July 20, 2022
538	Solid R	June 30, 2022
The Economist	Likely R	September 28, 2022

==== Polling ====
Poll source	Date(s) administered	Sample size	Margin of error	Carlos Giménez (R)	Robert Asencio (D)	Undecided
Impact Research (D) (Note: Poll sponsored by Asencio's campaign)	September 8–13, 2022	400 (LV)	± 5.0%	50%	40%	10%

==== Results ====
Florida's 28th congressional district, 2022
Party	Candidate	Votes	%
Republican	Carlos Giménez (incumbent)	134,457	63.7
Democratic	Robert Asencio	76,665	36.3
Independent	Jeremiah Schaffer (write-in)	28	0.0
Total votes		211,150	100.0
Republican hold			

== See also ==
- Elections in Florida
- Political party strength in Florida
- Florida Democratic Party
- Florida Republican Party
- Government of Florida
- 2022 United States Senate election in Florida
- 2022 Florida gubernatorial election
- 2022 Florida House of Representatives election
- 2022 Florida Senate election
- 2022 Florida elections
- 2022 United States gubernatorial elections
- 2022 United States elections

== Notes ==
Partisan clients
