= List of places in Florida: W-Z =

This list of current cities, towns, unincorporated communities, counties, and other recognized places in the U.S. state of Florida also includes information on the number and names of counties in which the place lies, and its lower and upper ZIP Code bounds, if applicable.

Name of place	Number of counties	Counties	Lower zip code	Upper zip code
Wabash	1	Polk	33801	
Wabasso	1	Indian River	32970	
Wabasso Beach	1	Indian River	32963	
Wacahoota	1	Alachua	32667	
Wachtokha	1	Suwannee		
Wacca	1	Levy		
Wacissa	1	Jefferson	32361	
Waddells Mill	1	Jackson		
Wade	1	Alachua		
Wadesboro	1	Leon	32301	
Wagner	1	Seminole		
Wagon Wheel	1	Collier		
Wahneta	1	Polk	33880	
Wahoo	1	Sumter	33513	
Waits Junction	1	Lake		
Wakulla	1	Wakulla	32327	
Wakulla Beach	1	Wakulla	32327	
Wakulla Gardens	1	Wakulla		
Wakulla Springs	1	Wakulla	32305	
Wakulla Station	1	Wakulla		
Walden Lake	1	Hillsborough	33566	
Waldo	1	Alachua	32694	
Walkill	1	Clay	32043	
Wallace	1	Santa Rosa	32570	
Wall Springs	1	Pinellas	33563	
Walnut Hill	1	Escambia	32568	
Walsingham	1	Pinellas		
Walton	1	St. Lucie	33457	
Wannee	1	Gilchrist	32619	
Ward	1	Leon		
Ward Basin	1	Santa Rosa		
Ward Ridge	1	Gulf	32456	
Wards Creek	1	St. Johns		
Warm Mineral Springs	1	Sarasota	34287	
Warrington	1	Escambia	32507	
Washington Park	1	Broward	33314	
Washington Shores	1	Orange		
Waterbury	1	Manatee	34251	
Watercolor	1	Walton		
Waterford Lakes	1	Orange		
Watergate	1	Palm Beach	33428	
Waters Lake	1	Gilchrist	32693	
Watersound	1	Walton		
Watertown	1	Columbia	32055	
Watson	1	Palm Beach		
Watson Island	1	Miami-Dade	33132	
Wauchula	1	Hardee	33873	
Wauchula Hills	1	Hardee	33873	
Waukeenah	1	Jefferson	32344	
Wausau	1	Washington	32463	
Waveland	1	St. Lucie		
Waverly	1	Polk	33877	
Waverly Hills	1	Leon		
Weathersfield	1	Seminole	32701	
Webb's City	1	Pinellas	33701	
Webbville	1	Jackson		
Webster	1	Sumter	33597	
Wedgefield	1	Orange		
Weeki Wachee	1	Hernando	34613	
Weeki Wachee Acres	1	Hernando		
Weeki Wachee Gardens	1	Hernando		
Weekiwachee Springs	1	Hernando		
Weirsdale	1	Marion	32195	
Wekiva	1	Lake		
Wekiva Springs	1	Seminole		
Wekiwa Manor	1	Orange	32703	
Wekiva Springs	1	Seminole		
Welaka	1	Putnam	32193	
Welcome	1	Hillsborough	33547	
Welchton	1	Marion		
Wellborn	1	Suwannee	32094	
Wellington	1	Palm Beach		
Wellswood	1	Hillsborough		
Wesconnett	1	Duval		
Wesley Chapel	1	Pasco	33543	
Wesley Chapel South	1	Pasco		
Wesley Manor	1	St. Johns	32223	
West and East Lealman	1	Pinellas		
West Auburndale	1	Polk	33823	
West Augustine	1	St. Johns	32084	
West Bay	1	Bay	32407	
West Bay	1	Duval	32219	
West Boca Raton	1	Palm Beach		
West Bradenton	1	Manatee	34205	
Westchase	1	Hillsborough		
Westchester	1	Miami-Dade	33165	
West Deerfield Beach	1	Broward		
West DeLand	1	Volusia		
West Delray Beach	1	Palm Beach		
West Dixie Bend	1	Broward		
West Eau Gallie	1	Brevard	32935	
West End	1	Jackson	32446	
West End	1	Marion		
Western Acres	1	Lee	33903	
West Farm	1	Madison	32340	
West Frost Proof	1	Polk	33843	
West Frostproof	1	Polk		
Westgate	1	Manatee	33505	
West Gate	1	Palm Beach	33401	
Westgate-Belvedere Homes	1	Palm Beach		
Westgate Lake Manor	1	Broward		
West Hills	1	Alachua	32601	
West Holly Hill	1	Volusia	32017	
West Hollywood	1	Broward	33083	
West Jacksonville	1	Duval	32220	
West Jensen	1	Martin		
West Kendall	1	Miami-Dade		
West Ken-Lark	1	Broward		
West Lake	1	Hamilton		
West Lakes	1	Palm Beach	33433	
West Lake Wales	1	Polk	33853	
West Lantana	1	Palm Beach	33462	
West Lealman	1	Pinellas		
West Little River	1	Miami-Dade		
West Melbourne	1	Brevard	32901	
West Miami	1	Miami-Dade	33144	
Westmoreland Estates	1	Alachua	32601	
West Occidental	1	Hamilton		
Weston	1	Broward	33071	
West Ormond Beach	1	Volusia		
West Palm Beach	1	Palm Beach	33401	20
West Palm Beach Farms	1	Palm Beach		
West Palmetto Park	1	Palm Beach	33432	
West Panama City Beach	1	Bay	32413	
West Park	1	Broward		
West Park	1	Hillsborough		
West Pensacola	1	Escambia	32505	
West Perrine	1	Miami-Dade		
West Polk	1	Polk		
West Samoset	1	Manatee		
West Scenic Park	1	Polk	33853	
Westside	1	Volusia	34478	
West Tampa	1	Hillsborough	33677	
West Tocoi	1	Clay	32043	
West Vero Beach	1	Indian River	32960	
West Vero Corridor	1	Indian River		
Westview	1	Miami-Dade	33168	
Westville	1	Holmes	32464	
Westward	1	Palm Beach	33411	
West Winter Haven	1	Polk		
Westwood	1	Duval	32229	
Westwood	1	Orange	32808	
Westwood Lakes	1	Miami-Dade	33165	
Wetumpka	1	Gadsden		
Wewahitchka	1	Gulf	32465	
Whidden Corner	1	Hendry		
Whiskey Creek	1	Lee		
Whispering Hills	1	Brevard		
Whispering Hills Golf Estates	1	Brevard		
Whispering Palms	1	Palm Beach	33460	
Whispering Pines	1	Okeechobee		
Whisper Walk	1	Palm Beach		
White Acres	1	Leon		
White Beach	1	Sarasota		
White City	1	Gulf	32465	
White City	1	St. Lucie	33452	
Whitehead Crossroads	1	Washington	32427	
Whitehouse	1	Duval	32220	
White House	1	Duval		
Whites Ford	1	St. Johns		
Whites Landing	1	Seminole	32765	
White Springs	1	Hamilton	32096	
White Springs	1	Liberty	32321	
White Trout Lake	1	Hillsborough		
Whiteville	1	Putnam		
Whitfield	1	Manatee	33580	
Whitfield	1	Santa Rosa		
Whitfield Estates	1	Manatee	33580	
Whiting Field Naval Air Station	1	Santa Rosa	32570	
Whitney	1	Lake	32748	
Whitney Beach	1	Manatee	34228	
Whittier	1	Osceola		
Wiggins	1	Manatee		
Wilbur-by-the-Sea	1	Volusia	32016	
Wilburn	1	Columbia		
Wilcox	1	Gilchrist	32693	
Wilcox Junction	1	Gilchrist		
Wild Island	1	Highlands		
Wilds Landing	1	Nassau		
Wildwood	1	Sumter	34785	
Wiley	1	Brevard		
Williams	1	Brevard		
Williamsburg	1	Orange	32821	
Williams Camp	1	Levy		
Williams Point	1	Brevard	32922	
Williford	1	Gilchrist		
Willis	1	Calhoun		
Willis Landing	1	Gulf	32465	
Williston	1	Levy	32696	
Williston Highlands	1	Levy		
Willow	1	Manatee	33564	
Willow Oak	1	Polk	33860	
Wilma	1	Liberty		
Wilson	1	Brevard		
Wilson Haven	1	Pasco	33512	
Wilton Manor	1	Broward	33305	
Wilton Manors	1	Broward	33334	
Wimauma	1	Hillsborough	33598	
Wimberly Estates	1	Alachua		
Windermere	1	Orange	34786	
Windley Key	1	Monroe		
Windmill Village Trailer Park	1	Collier	33940	
Windsor	1	Alachua	32601	
Windsor	1	Indian River		
Windy Hill	1	Duval	32216	
Winfield	1	Columbia	32055	
Winslow Beach	1	Brevard	32931	
Winston	1	Polk	33803	
Winter Beach	1	Indian River	32971	
Winter Garden	1	Orange	34777	
Winter Haven	1	Polk	33880	85
Winter Park	1	Orange	32789	93
Winter Springs	1	Seminole	32708	
Wiscon	1	Hernando		
Wisconsin Village	1	Brevard		
Withla	1	Polk		
Wolfolk	1	Polk		
Wonderwood	1	Duval	32233	
Woodland Acres	1	Duval	32211	
Woodland Drives	1	Leon		
Woodland Park	1	Lee	33902	
Woodlawn	1	Bay	32401	
Woodlawn Beach	1	Santa Rosa	32561	
Wood Memorial Hospital	1	DeSoto	33821	
Woodmere	1	Sarasota		
Woodruff	1	Gadsden		
Woodruff Springs	1	Seminole	32771	
Woods	1	Liberty	32321	
Woods	1	Pasco		
Woodside Heights	1	Leon	32301	
Woodville	1	Bay	32401	
Woodville	1	Leon	32362	
Woodward Avenue	1	Leon	32316	
World Commerce Center	1	St. Johns		
World Golf Village	1	St. Johns		
Worthington Springs	1	Union	32697	
Wright	1	Okaloosa	32548	
Wulfert	1	Lee		
Wycliffe	1	Palm Beach		
Wynnehaven Beach	1	Okaloosa	32569	
Wynwood	1	Seminole	32771	
Yacht Harbor	1	Palm Beach	33404	
Yalaha	1	Lake	34797	
Yamato	1	Palm Beach		
Yankeetown	1	Levy	34498	
Ybel	1	Lee		
Ybor City	1	Hillsborough	33605	
Yeehaw	1	Indian River		
Yeehaw Junction	1	Osceola	33472	
Yellow Bluff	1	Marion	32134	
Yellow Bluff Fort	1	Duval		
Yellow Jacket	1	Dixie		
Yelvington	1	St. Johns	32031	
Yniestra	1	Escambia		
Yon's Lakeside Estates	1	Leon	32301	
Yon's Subdivision	1	Glades	32456	
York	1	Marion	32670	
Youmans	1	Hillsborough	33566	
Youngstown	1	Bay	32466	
Yukon	1	Duval	32230	
Yulee	1	Nassau	32097	
Yulee Heights	1	Nassau		
Zana	1	Martin		
Zeagler	1	Putnam	32077	
Zellwood	1	Orange	32798	
Zephyrhills	1	Pasco	33539	44
Zephyrhills North	1	Pasco		
Zephyrhills South	1	Pasco		
Zephyrhills West	1	Pasco		
Zolfo Springs	1	Hardee	33890	
Zuber	1	Marion	32670	

== See also ==
- Florida
- List of municipalities in Florida
- List of former municipalities in Florida
- List of counties in Florida
- List of census-designated places in Florida
