= Florida's 10th congressional district =

U.S. House district for Florida

Coordinates: 28°30′58″N 81°44′28″W

- Map of district boundaries
- Representative: Maxwell Frost; D–Orlando
- Area: 516 mi^{2} (1,340 km^{2})
- Distribution: 98.67% urban; 1.33% rural
- Population (2025): 784,444
- Median household income: $73,824
- Ethnicity: 35.5% White; 29.9% Hispanic; 24.2% Black; 4.7% Asian; 4.4% Two or more races; 1.3% other
- Cook PVI: D+13

Florida's 10th congressional district is a congressional district in the U.S. state of Florida. It was reassigned in 2012, effective January 3, 2013, Central Florida. Before 2017, the district included parts of western Orange County, most of Lake County, as well as a northern section of Polk County. The current district is entirely within Orange County, and covers most of its western portion. It is situated along the Interstate 4 corridor. It includes most of the western half of Orlando. Other cities and towns wholly or partly within the district include Apopka, Belle Isle, Eatonville, Harlem Heights, Ocoee, Oak Ridge, Orlo Vista, Winter Garden, and Windermere. In 2020, the district was expanded further north and south to include most of Orlando east of Interstate 4, the Baldwin Park area (redevelopment of the former Naval Training Center Orlando), Orlando Executive Airport, Winter Park, the portion of Maitland within Orange County, Azalea Park, Goldenrod, Rio Pinar and Alafaya/Waterford Lakes areas, and continuing east to the University of Central Florida, Naval Support Activity Orlando, the Central Florida Research Park, and the Lake Pickett, Bithlo and Wedgefield areas. Even with this expansion, the 10th remains a minority majority district.

It is currently represented by Democrat Maxwell Frost. Due to redistricting after the 2010 census, this district was re-numbered, and slightly reconfigured from the former 8th district. Prior to 2017, it was considered a swing district with a slight Republican tilt. Due to mid-decade redistricting that occurred in 2016, the district became much more compact. It is now considered solidly Democratic.

The former 10th district, during 2003–2012, covered areas further west and encompassed much of Pinellas County, on the Gulf coast of central Florida.

== Composition ==
For the 118th and successive Congresses (based on redistricting following the 2020 census), the district contains all or portions of the following counties and communities:

Orange County (21)

Alafaya, Azalea Park, Bithlo, Christmas (part; also 8th), Clarcona (part; also 11th), Doctor Phillips (part; also 11th), Eatonville, Fairview Shores, Goldenrod (part; also 7th; shared with Seminole County), Lockhart, Maitland, Oak Ridge, Orlando (part; also 9th), Orlo Vista, Pine Hills (part; also 11th), Rio Pinar, Tangelo Park, Union Park, University, Wedgefield (part; also 8th), Winter Park

== List of members representing the district ==
Member	Party	Years	Cong ress	Electoral history	District location
District created January 3, 1963
Sam Gibbons (Tampa)	Democratic	January 3, 1963 – January 3, 1967	88th 89th	Elected in 1962. Re-elected in 1964. Redistricted to the 6th district.	1963–1973 [data missing]
J. Herbert Burke (Hollywood)	Republican	January 3, 1967 – January 3, 1973	90th 91st 92nd	Elected in 1966. Re-elected in 1968. Re-elected in 1970. Redistricted to the 12th district.	1963–1973 [data missing]
Skip Bafalis (Fort Myers Beach)	Republican	January 3, 1973 – January 3, 1983	93rd 94th 95th 96th 97th	Elected in 1972. Re-elected in 1974. Re-elected in 1976. Re-elected in 1978. Re-elected in 1980. Retired to run for Governor of Florida.	1973–1983 [data missing]
Andy Ireland (Winter Park)	Democratic	January 3, 1983 – July 15, 1984	98th 99th 100th 101st 102nd	Redistricted from the 8th district and re-elected in 1982. Changed parties. Re-elected in 1984. Re-elected in 1986. Re-elected in 1988. Re-elected in 1990. Retired.	1983–1993 [data missing]
Andy Ireland (Winter Park)	Republican	July 15, 1984 – January 3, 1993	98th 99th 100th 101st 102nd	Redistricted from the 8th district and re-elected in 1982. Changed parties. Re-elected in 1984. Re-elected in 1986. Re-elected in 1988. Re-elected in 1990. Retired.	1983–1993 [data missing]
Bill Young (Indian Shores)	Republican	January 3, 1993 – January 3, 2013	103rd 104th 105th 106th 107th 108th 109th 110th 111th 112th	Redistricted from the 8th district and re-elected in 1992. Re-elected in 1994. Re-elected in 1996. Re-elected in 1998. Re-elected in 2000. Re-elected in 2002. Re-elected in 2004. Re-elected in 2006. Re-elected in 2008. Re-elected in 2010. Redistricted to the 13th district.	1993–2003 [data missing]
Bill Young (Indian Shores)	Republican	January 3, 1993 – January 3, 2013	103rd 104th 105th 106th 107th 108th 109th 110th 111th 112th	Redistricted from the 8th district and re-elected in 1992. Re-elected in 1994. Re-elected in 1996. Re-elected in 1998. Re-elected in 2000. Re-elected in 2002. Re-elected in 2004. Re-elected in 2006. Re-elected in 2008. Re-elected in 2010. Redistricted to the 13th district.	2003–2013
Daniel Webster (Orlando)	Republican	January 3, 2013 – January 3, 2017	113th 114th	Redistricted from the 8th district and re-elected in 2012. Re-elected in 2014. Redistricted to the 11th district.	2013–2017
Val Demings (Orlando)	Democratic	January 3, 2017 – January 3, 2023	115th 116th 117th	Elected in 2016. Re-elected in 2018. Re-elected in 2020. Retired to run for U.S. Senator.	2017–2023
Maxwell Frost (Orlando)	Democratic	January 3, 2023 – present	118th 119th	Elected in 2022. Re-elected in 2024; Re-elected in 2026.	2023–2027: Most of Orlando

== Recent election results ==
=== 1992 ===
Party	Candidate	Votes	%
Republican Party	Bill Young	149,606	56.6%
Democratic Party	Karen Moffitt	114,809	43.4%
Republican hold			

=== 1994 ===
Party	Candidate	Votes	%
Republican Party	Bill Young (incumbent)	Unopposed	100%
Republican hold			

=== 1996 ===
Party		Candidate	Votes	%
Republican Party	Bill Young (incumbent)	114,443	66.6%	
Democratic Party	Henry Green	57,375	33.4%	
Republican hold				

=== 1998 ===
Party	Candidate	Votes	%
Republican Party	Bill Young (incumbent)	Unopposed	100%
Republican hold			

=== 2000 ===
Party	Candidate	Votes	%
Republican Party	Bill Young (incumbent)	146,799	75.7%
Natural Law	Josette Green	26,908	13.9%
Independent	Randy Heine	20,296	10.5%
Republican hold			

=== 2002 ===
Party	Candidate	Votes	%
Republican Party	Bill Young (incumbent)	Unopposed	100%
Republican hold			

=== 2004 ===
Party	Candidate	Votes	%
Republican Party	Bill Young (incumbent)	207,052	69.3%
Democratic Party	Bob D. Derry	91,568	30.7%
Republican hold			

=== 2006 ===
Party	Candidate	Votes	%
Republican Party	Bill Young (incumbent)	131,301	66%
Democratic Party	Samm Simpson	67,285	34%
Republican hold			

=== 2008 ===
Party	Candidate	Votes	%
Republican Party	Bill Young (incumbent)	182,781	60.7%
Democratic Party	Bob Hackworth	118,460	39.3%
Republican hold			

=== 2010 ===
Bill Young won re-election over Charlie Justice with 65.9% of the vote.

=== 2012 ===
Due to redistricting, the 8th district was renumbered to become the 10th district. Freshman Republican Daniel Webster sought re-election, and despite the renumbering of the district, would be considered the election's incumbent.

Val Demings, a former Chief of the Orlando Police Department and wife of the Orange County Sheriff, entered the race and won the Democratic nomination. Democrat Alan Grayson, who represented the district from 2009 until 2011, was rumored to be interested in jumping into the mix. However, he ultimately did not enter the race, and instead ran for the open seat in the new 9th district.

On election day, Webster won a fairly narrow 3.4% victory over Demings to secure re-election. Webster slightly underperformed in the district compared to the top of the ticket, where presidential candidate Mitt Romney received 53.4% of the vote.

Florida 10th Congressional District 2012
Party	Candidate	Votes	%
Republican	Daniel Webster (Incumbent)	164,649	51.7
Democratic	Val Demings	153,574	48.3
Write-In	Naipaul Seegolam	46	0.0
Total votes		318,269	100.0

=== 2014 ===
Republican incumbent Daniel Webster ran for re-election. His Democratic opponent from 2012, Val Demings, pulled out of a possible re-match to run for Orange County Mayor instead. Ultimately, she pulled out of that race as well. Webster was unopposed in the Republican primary.

On the Democratic side, three candidates faced off in the August 26 primary. The candidates included former Eustis City Commissioner William Ferree, civil rights lawyer and Trayvon Martin family attorney Shayan Modarres, and former Navy Chief Petty Officer Mike McKenna. McKenna, a Walt Disney World security officer (49.9%) won the Democratic primary, and faced Webster in the November general election. McKenna spent only $5,000 on his primary campaign, a fraction of his two opponents.

On July 11, 2014, Florida Circuit Court Judge Terry Lewis ruled that this district, along with the neighboring minority-access District 5, was drawn to favor Republicans. On August 1, Judge Lewis gave Florida's state legislature an Aug. 15 deadline to submit new congressional maps for those two districts.

In the general election, Webster was a decided favorite, and ran only a few television ads. With very little money in his campaign funds, McKenna ran no ads, instead counting on a grass-roots, "door-to-door" campaign. Webster easily cruised to reelection by a margin of 62% to 38%.

=== 2016 ===
Due to a series of court-ordered re-drawings that made the 10th district substantially more Democratic-leaning, Republican incumbent Daniel Webster announced he would instead run for the open seat in the 11th district. Webster's departure created an open-seat election for the updated 10th District, which immediately drew the interest of multiple Democrats. Val Demings won the primary, and easily won the general election.

==== Republican primary ====
- Geoff LaGarde withdrew his name from the race on June 24 and endorsed Thuy Lowe for the nomination. Lowe was declared the nominee, and no Republican primary was held.

==== Democratic primary ====
- Val Demings, former Orlando police chief and nominee in 2012
- Fatima Fahmy, attorney
- Bob Poe, former chair of the Florida Democratic Party
- Geraldine Thompson, state senator

Val Demings won the primary on August 30, 2016.

Primary Election
Party	Candidate	Votes	%
Democratic	Val Demings	23,260	57.12
Democratic	Geraldine F. Thompson	8,192	20.12
Democratic	Bob Poe	6,918	16.99
Democratic	Fatima Rita Fahmy	2,349	5.77
Total votes		40,719	100

==== General election ====
Florida's 10th congressional district election, 2016
Party	Candidate	Votes	%
Democratic	Val Demings	198,491	64.87
Republican	Thuy Lowe	107,498	35.13
Total votes		305,989	100
Democratic gain from Republican			

=== 2018 ===
The 10th district was centered around Orlando and the surrounding suburbs such as Lockhart, Oak Ridge, and Zellwood. Democrat Val Demings was elected with 65% of the vote in 2016. Because no write-in candidates or candidates of other parties filed to run in this district, the Democratic primary was open to all voters.

- Wade Darius, marketing firm owner
- Val Demings, incumbent

Democratic primary results
Party	Candidate	Votes	%
Democratic	Val Demings (incumbent)	73,583	75.0
Democratic	Wade Darius	24,519	25.0
Total votes		98,102	100.0

Incumbent Val Demings ran unopposed in the general election.

=== 2020 ===
2020 United States House of Representatives elections in Florida
Party	Candidate	Votes	%
Democratic	Val Demings (incumbent)	239,434	63.61%
Republican	Vennia Francois	136,889	36.36%
Independent	Sufiyah Yasmine (write-in)	74	0.01%
Total votes		376,397	100.0
Democratic hold			

=== 2022 ===
2022 United States House of Representatives elections in Florida
Party	Candidate	Votes	%
Democratic	Maxwell Frost	117,955	59.00%
Republican	Calvin Wimbish	78,844	39.44%
Independent	Jason Holic	2,001	1.00%
Independent	Usha Jain	1,110	0.56%
Total votes		199,910	100.0
Democratic hold			

=== 2024 ===
2024 United States House of Representatives elections in Florida
Party	Candidate	Votes	%
Democratic	Maxwell Frost	181,455	62.37%
Republican	Willie J. Montague	109,460	37.63%
Total votes		290,915	100.0
Democratic hold			

=== 2026 ===
Incumbent Maxwell Frost ran for re-election unopposed after all other opponents declined to run or failed to qualify for the ballot.

2026 United States House of Representatives elections in Florida
Party	Candidate	Votes	%
Democratic	Maxwell Frost	Unopposed	100.00%
Democratic hold			

== Recent election results from statewide races ==
Year	Office	Results
2008	President	Obama 63% - 36%
2010	Senate	Rubio 43% - 32%
2010	Governor	Sink 60% - 40%
2010	Attorney General	Gelber 49% - 43%
2010	Chief Financial Officer	Ausley 45% - 44%
2012	President	Obama 63% - 37%
2012	Senate	Nelson 69% - 31%
2014	Governor	Crist 61% - 39%
2016	President	Clinton 64% - 31%
2016	Senate	Murphy 58% - 37%
2018	Senate	Nelson 66% - 33%
2018	Governor	Gillum 67% - 32%
2018	Attorney General	Shaw 63% - 35%
2018	Chief Financial Officer	Ring 65% - 35%
2020	President	Biden 65% - 34%
2022	Senate	Demings 60% - 39%
2022	Governor	Crist 58% - 41%
2022	Attorney General	Ayala 57% - 43%
2022	Chief Financial Officer	Hattersley 59% - 41%
2024	President	Harris 61% - 38%
2024	Senate	Mucarsel-Powell 59% - 38%

== Sources ==
- Martis, Kenneth C. (1989). The Historical Atlas of Political Parties in the United States Congress. New York: Macmillan Publishing Company.
- Martis, Kenneth C. (1982). The Historical Atlas of United States Congressional Districts. New York: Macmillan Publishing Company.
- Congressional Biographical Directory of the United States 1774–present
- District Map at GovTrack.us
