= Florida's 15th congressional district =

U.S. House district for Florida

- Map of district boundaries
- Representative: Laurel Lee; R–Tampa
- Area: 1,170 mi^{2} (3,000 km^{2})
- Distribution: 92.06% urban; 7.94% rural
- Population (2025): 851,740
- Median household income: $78,853
- Ethnicity: 51.1% White; 25.2% Hispanic; 13.7% Black; 5.2% Asian; 3.9% Two or more races; 0.9% other
- Cook PVI: R+9

Florida's 15th congressional district is an electoral district for the U.S. Congress and is located in the northeastern suburbs of Tampa, including parts of Hillsborough, Pasco, and Polk counties. The district includes Plant City and Zephyrhills, as well as parts of Tampa city proper, Brandon, and Lakeland.

From 2003 to 2013, the prior 15th district contained most of Brevard County south of the city of Cocoa (including the Kennedy Space Center), all of Indian River County, most of Osceola County, and a very small portion of Polk County. The district took in the cities of Kissimmee, Melbourne, and Vero Beach, as well as Patrick Space Force Base. Boundaries were redrawn due to a lawsuit in 2015. Much of this area is now the 8th district, while the current 15th takes in most of what was previously the 12th district.

From 2013 to 2017, the district included the northern parts of Hillsborough and Polk counties. After court-ordered redistricting for the 2016 elections, it also included the southernmost parts of Lake County.

The district is currently represented by Republican Laurel Lee.

== Recent election results from statewide races ==
| Year | Office | Results |
|---|---|---|
| 2008 | President | McCain 50% - 49% |
| 2010 | Senate | Rubio 47% - 17% |
| 2010 | Governor | Scott 52% - 48% |
| 2010 | Attorney General | Bondi 59% - 36% |
| 2010 | Chief Financial Officer | Atwater 58% - 35% |
| 2012 | President | Romney 51% - 49% |
| 2012 | Senate | Nelson 57% - 43% |
| 2014 | Governor | Scott 52% - 48% |
| 2016 | President | Trump 50% - 46% |
| 2016 | Senate | Rubio 52% - 43% |
| 2018 | Senate | Scott 50% - 49% |
| 2018 | Governor | DeSantis 50% - 49% |
| 2018 | Attorney General | Moody 54% - 44% |
| 2018 | Chief Financial Officer | Patronis 52% - 48% |
| 2020 | President | Trump 51% - 48% |
| 2022 | Senate | Rubio 57% - 41% |
| 2022 | Governor | DeSantis 59% - 40% |
| 2022 | Attorney General | Moody 61% - 39% |
| 2022 | Chief Financial Officer | Patronis 59% - 41% |
| 2024 | President | Trump 55% - 44% |
| 2024 | Senate | Scott 54% - 44% |

== Composition ==
For the 118th and successive Congresses (based on redistricting following the 2020 census), the district contains all or portions of the following counties and communities:

Hillsborough County (18)

Brandon (part; also 16th), Carrollwood (part; also 14th), Cheval, Dover, East Lake-Orient Park (part; also 14th), Keystone (part; also 14th), Lake Magdalene, Lutz, Mango, Northdale (part; also 14th), Pebble Creek, Plant City, Seffner, Tampa (part; also 14th), Temple Terrace, Thonotosassa, University, Valrico (part; also 16th)

Pasco County (9)

Crystal Springs, Land O' Lakes (part; also 12th), Odessa (part; also 12th), Pasadena Hills (part; also 12th), Wesley Chapel (part; also 12th), Zephyrhills, Zephyrhills North, Zephyrhills South, Zephyrhills West

Polk County (4)

Kathleen, Lakeland (part; also 18th), Medulla (part; also 18th), Willow Oak (part; also 18th)

== List of members representing the district ==
| Representative | Party | Years | Congress | Note | District location |
|---|---|---|---|---|---|
District created January 3, 1973
| Dante Fascell (Miami) | Democratic | January 3, 1973 – January 3, 1983 | 93rd 94th 95th 96th 97th | Redistricted from the 12th district and re-elected in 1972. Re-elected in 1974. Re-elected in 1976. Re-elected in 1978. Re-elected in 1980. Redistricted to the 19th district. | |
| Clay Shaw (Fort Lauderdale) | Republican | January 3, 1983 – January 3, 1993 | 98th 99th 100th 101st 102nd | Redistricted from the 12th district and re-elected in 1982. Re-elected in 1984. Re-elected in 1986. Re-elected in 1988. Re-elected in 1990. Redistricted to the 22nd district. | |
| Jim Bacchus (Merritt Island) | Democratic | January 3, 1993 – January 3, 1995 | 103rd | Redistricted from the 11th district and re-elected in 1992. Retired. | 1993–2003 [data missing] |
| Dave Weldon (Indialantic) | Republican | January 3, 1995 – January 3, 2009 | 104th 105th 106th 107th 108th 109th 110th | Elected in 1994. Re-elected in 1996. Re-elected in 1998. Re-elected in 2000. Re-elected in 2002. Re-elected in 2004. Re-elected in 2006. Retired. | 1993–2003 [data missing] |
| Dave Weldon (Indialantic) | Republican | January 3, 1995 – January 3, 2009 | 104th 105th 106th 107th 108th 109th 110th | Elected in 1994. Re-elected in 1996. Re-elected in 1998. Re-elected in 2000. Re-elected in 2002. Re-elected in 2004. Re-elected in 2006. Retired. | 2003–2013 |
| Bill Posey (Rockledge) | Republican | January 3, 2009 – January 3, 2013 | 111th 112th | Elected in 2008. Re-elected in 2010. Redistricted to the 8th district. | 2003–2013 |
| Dennis Ross (Lakeland) | Republican | January 3, 2013 – January 3, 2019 | 113th 114th 115th | Redistricted from the 12th district and re-elected in 2012. Re-elected in 2014. Re-elected in 2016. Retired. | 2013–2017 |
| Dennis Ross (Lakeland) | Republican | January 3, 2013 – January 3, 2019 | 113th 114th 115th | Redistricted from the 12th district and re-elected in 2012. Re-elected in 2014. Re-elected in 2016. Retired. | 2017–2023 |
| Ross Spano (Riverview) | Republican | January 3, 2019 – January 3, 2021 | 116th | Elected in 2018. Lost renomination. | 2017–2023 |
| Scott Franklin (Lakeland) | Republican | January 3, 2021 – January 3, 2023 | 117th | Elected in 2020. Redistricted to the 18th district. | 2017–2023 |
| Laurel Lee (Tampa) | Republican | January 3, 2023 – present | 118th 119th | Elected in 2022. Re-elected in 2024. Re-elected in 2026. | 2023–2027 |

== Election results ==
=== 2002 ===
Florida's 15th Congressional District Election (2002)
| Party | Candidate | Votes | % |
|---|---|---|---|
| Republican | Dave Weldon* | 146,414 | 63.15 |
| Democratic | Jim Tso | 85,433 | 36.85 |
| Total votes | | 231,847 | 100.00 |
| Turnout | | | |
| Republican hold | | | |

=== 2004 ===
Florida's 15th Congressional District Election (2004)
| Party | Candidate | Votes | % |
|---|---|---|---|
| Republican | Dave Weldon* | 210,388 | 65.35 |
| Democratic | Simon Pristoop | 111,538 | 34.65 |
| Total votes | | 321,926 | 100.00 |
| Turnout | | | |
| Republican hold | | | |

=== 2006 ===
Florida's 15th Congressional District Election (2006)
| Party | Candidate | Votes | % |
|---|---|---|---|
| Republican | Dave Weldon* | 125,965 | 56.29 |
| Democratic | Robert Bowman | 97,834 | 43.71 |
| Total votes | | 223,799 | 100.00 |
| Turnout | | | |
| Republican hold | | | |

=== 2008 ===
Florida's 15th Congressional District Election (2008)
| Party | Candidate | Votes | % |
|---|---|---|---|
| Republican | Bill Posey | 192,151 | 53.10 |
| Democratic | Stephen Lee Blythe | 151,951 | 41.99 |
| Independent | Frank Zilaitis | 14,274 | 3.94 |
| Independent | Trevor Lowing | 3,495 | 0.97 |
| Total votes | | 361,871 | 100.00 |
| Turnout | | | |
| Republican hold | | | |

=== 2010 ===
Florida's 15th Congressional District Election (2010)
| Party | Candidate | Votes | % |
|---|---|---|---|
| Republican | Bill Posey* | 157,079 | 64.76 |
| Democratic | C. Shannon Roberts | 85,595 | 35.27 |
| Total votes | | 242,674 | 100.00 |
| Turnout | | | |
| Republican hold | | | |

=== 2012 ===
Republican candidate Dennis Ross won the election unopposed, as the Democrats did not nominate a candidate. Ross at the time was already the incumbent of the old 12th District prior to the 2010 reapportionment.

=== 2014 ===
Florida's 15th Congressional District Election (2014)
| Party | Candidate | Votes | % |
|---|---|---|---|
| Republican | Dennis Ross | 128,750 | 60.3 |
| Democratic | Alan Cohn | 84,832 | 39.7 |
| Total votes | | 213,582 | 100.00 |
| Turnout | | | |
| Republican hold | | | |

=== 2016 ===
Florida's 15th Congressional District Election (2016)
| Party | Candidate | Votes | % |
|---|---|---|---|
| Republican | Dennis Ross* | 182,999 | 57.5 |
| Democratic | Jim Lange | 135,475 | 42.5 |
| Total votes | | 318,474 | 100.00 |
| Turnout | | | |
| Republican hold | | | |

=== 2018 ===
Florida's 15th Congressional District Election (2018)
| Party | Candidate | Votes | % |
|---|---|---|---|
| Republican | Ross Spano | 151,380 | 53.02 |
| Democratic | Kristen Carlson | 134,132 | 46.98 |
| Total votes | | 285,532 | 100.00 |
| Turnout | | | |
| Republican hold | | | |

=== 2020 ===
2020 United States House of Representatives elections in Florida
| Party | Candidate | Votes | % |
|---|---|---|---|
| Republican | Scott Franklin | 216,374 | 55.38% |
| Democratic | Alan Cohn | 174,297 | 44.61% |
| Total votes | | 390,671 | 100.0 |
| Republican hold | | | |

=== 2022 ===
2022 United States House of Representatives elections in Florida
| Party | Candidate | Votes | % |
|---|---|---|---|
| Republican | Laurel Lee | 145,219 | 58.54% |
| Democratic | Alan Cohn | 102,835 | 41.46% |
| Total votes | | 248,054 | 100.0 |
| Republican hold | | | |

=== 2024 ===
2024 United States House of Representatives elections in Florida
| Party | Candidate | Votes | % |
|---|---|---|---|
| Republican | Laurel Lee (incumbent) | 195,334 | 56.18% |
| Democratic | Pat Kemp | 152,361 | 43.82% |
| Total votes | | 347,695 | 100.0 |
| Republican hold | | | |
