= Alan Cohn =

American journalist (born 1962 or 1963)

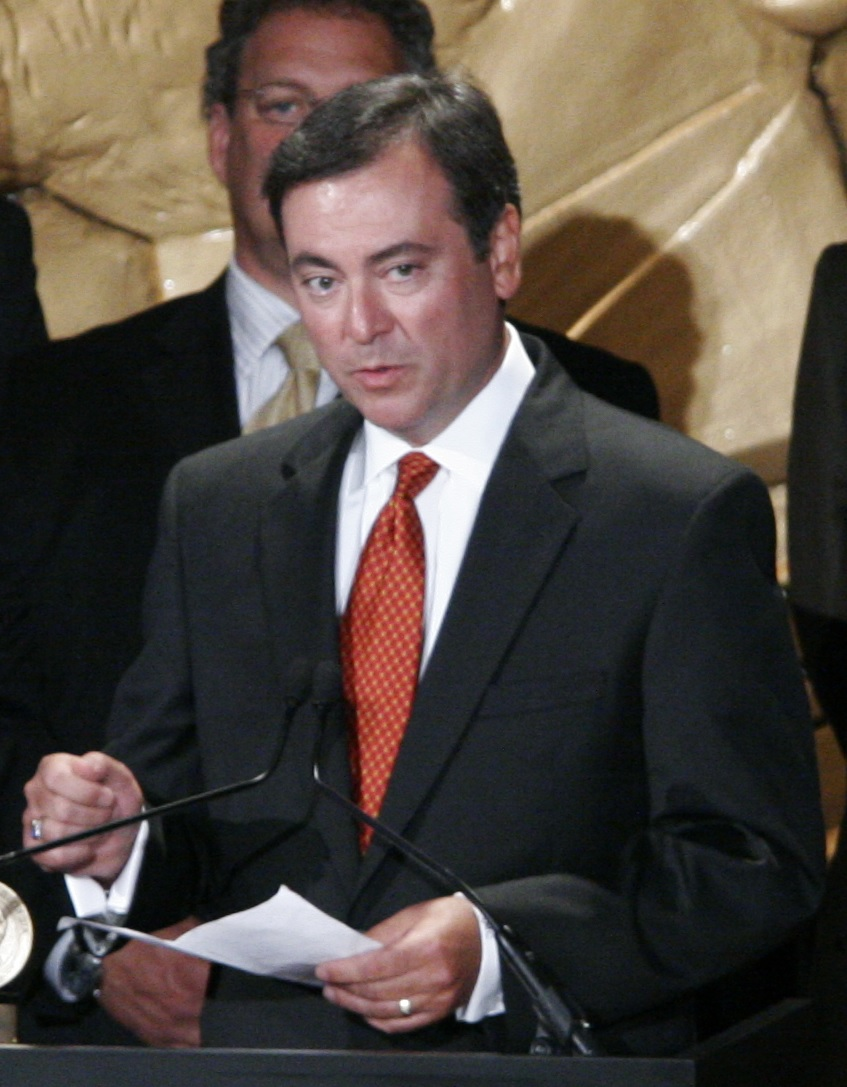
- Cohn at the 66th Annual Peabody Awards in 2007
- Born: Alan Michael Cohn; 1962 or 1963 (age 63–64)
- Education: Hofstra University (BA)
- Occupation: Journalist
- Political party: Democratic
- Spouse: Patricia
- Children: 2
- Website: Campaign website

Alan Michael Cohn (born 1962 or 1963) is an American journalist who was the Democratic nominee in the 2022 U.S. House of Representatives election in Florida's 15th congressional district.

== Early life and education ==
Cohn was born in 1962 or 1963.

He graduated from Hofstra University. While at Hofstra, Cohn worked for CBS News in New York. He considers fellow Charles Osgood to be his mentor.

== Journalism career ==
Cohn won the 2020 Democratic nomination for Congress in Florida's 15th congressional district and went on to raise over $2.3 million. He was named to the DCCC's "Red to Blue" program and was endorsed by President-Elect Joe Biden and former president Barack Obama.

Cohn is the recipient of the 2007 George Foster Peabody Award, one of journalism's highest honors, for uncovering that defective parts were being installed on Black Hawk helicopters built by Stratford-based Sikorsky Aircraft. He was the anchor and managing editor of ABC7 at 7 on WWSB in Sarasota, where he interviewed people including Donald Trump and Jerry Springer. Cohn also worked for WFTS-TV in Tampa ABC. Cohn won the Peabody Award for a multi-year investigation of quality control issues at Sikorsky Aircraft. While at WTNH, Cohn uncovered a scandal involving DMV employees illegally selling driver's licenses, as well as security gaps in Metro North. Cohn has also worked for NBC, New England Cable News (where he won an Emmy Award for uncovering a convicted killer's attempt to become a Boston Police officer), the Boston Globe, WTIC-TV, WGGB-TV, and WAMI-TV in Miami, Florida (where he won an Emmy Award for winning back benefits for a forgotten Vietnam veteran).

== Political career ==
Cohn ran in the 15th district in the 2020 election. In the Democratic primary election, Cohn defeated state representative Adam Hattersley and U.S. Marine Corps veteran Jesse Philippe, earning 41% of the vote. In the general election, Cohn faced Republican Scott Franklin, a Lakeland city commissioner who had previously defeated incumbent Ross Spano in the Republican primary. Ultimately, Franklin defeated Cohn, 55%-45%.

In the 2022 election, Cohn won the Democratic primary for the newly redrawn 15th district, finishing first out of a five-candidate field with 33.1% of the vote. He went on to lose the general election for this district to Republican nominee Laurel Lee by 17 percentage points.

== Personal life ==
Cohn has two children with his wife, Patricia. Their son, Aaron, is a pitcher in the Oakland A's organization.
