= Burlington County Times =

Newspaper in Willingboro Township, New Jersey

- Type: Daily newspaper
- Format: Broadsheet
- Owner: USA Today Co.
- Publisher: Mike Jameson
- Editor: Patricia S. Walker
- Founded: 1958 as Levittown Times
- Headquarters: 116B Burrs Road, Westampton, New Jersey 08060
- Country: United States
- Circulation: 1,966 (as of 2024)
- OCLC number: 15288442
- Website: burlingtoncountytimes.com

Logo in 2011

The Burlington County Times is a daily newspaper located in Westampton, New Jersey, U.S. The paper, which is part of the USA Today Co. chain of newspapers, covers municipal and county issues in Burlington County, New Jersey, as well as local and professional sporting events.

== Coverage ==
The paper publishes weekly special sections, including "To Do", a guide to local entertainment, and "Spot" a weekly guide to things to see and do in Marlton, New Jersey, Medford, New Jersey, Medford Lakes, New Jersey, Moorestown, New Jersey, Mount Laurel, New Jersey, Riverton, New Jersey, and Southampton, New Jersey.

In September 2013 the Burlington County Times launched a website, which features daily news stories, editorial content, obituaries, photographs, videos, and a community calendar. The paper also has a suite of mobile apps for iOS, Android and Kindle Fire.

== History ==
The paper was founded in 1958 by S.W. Calkins, who already owned the Bucks County Courier Times in Bucks County, Pennsylvania and The Herald-Standard in Uniontown, Pennsylvania. At the urging of builder William Levitt, Calkins began the Levittown Times in now Willingboro, New Jersey, with offices and a printing facility on U.S. Route 130. Following the name change of Levittown to Willingboro, the name of the newspaper changed to "Burlington County Times." In the early 1970s, the paper went from a 6-day afternoon paper at a cost of 60 cents per week to a 7-day paper. Only the Sunday paper was a morning paper, the rest of the week still being published in the afternoons. With the addition of Sunday, the weekly subscription price rose to 75 cents. In 2008, print operations were shifted to a new facility in Falls Township, Pennsylvania along with the Bucks County Courier Times and The Intelligencer. In 2017, Calkins Media was acquired by GateHouse Media.

== Notable writers ==
- Bill Fleischman (1961 to 1966)
