= Lealman, Florida =

- Census-designated place
- Location in Pinellas County and the state of Florida
- Coordinates: 27°49′11″N 82°41′05″W
- Country: United States
- State: Florida
- County: Pinellas

Area
  - Total: 4.09 sq mi (10.59 km^{2})
  - Land: 4.02 sq mi (10.42 km^{2})
  - Water: 0.066 sq mi (0.17 km^{2})
- Elevation: 46 ft (14 m)

Population (2020)
  - Total: 21,189
  - Density: 5,267.8/sq mi (2,033.91/km^{2})
- Time zone: UTC-5 (Eastern (EST))
  - Summer (DST): UTC-4 (EDT)
- ZIP Code: 33714
- Area code: 727
- FIPS code: 12-75912
- GNIS feature ID: 2583359

Lealman, known as East Lealman until 2010, is a census-designated place (CDP) in Pinellas County, Florida, United States. As of the 2020 census, Lealman had a population of 21,189. Prior to 2010, Lealman was part of a larger CDP named West and East Lealman.

In 2015, the Pinellas County Board of County Commissioners created the Lealman Community Redevelopment Area (CRA), the first redevelopment area in unincorporated Pinellas County.

== Geography ==
Lealman is bordered by the city of Pinellas Park to the north, St. Petersburg to the east and south, and by the town of West Lealman to the west. The elevation is 49 feet (15 m) above sea level.

According to the United States Census Bureau, the CDP has a total area of 4.1 square miles (10.5 km^{2}), of which 4.0 square miles (10.4 km^{2}) is land, and 0.04 square miles (0.1 km^{2}) (1.63%) is water.

== Demographics ==
Historical population
Census	Pop.	Note	%±
2020	21,189		—
U.S. Decennial Census

Lealman first appeared as a census designated place in the 2010 U.S. census formed from part of the deleted West and East Lealman, Florida CDP and additional area.

=== 2020 census ===
As of the 2020 census, Lealman had a population of 21,189. The median age was 45.6 years. 18.0% of residents were under the age of 18 and 20.2% of residents were 65 years of age or older. For every 100 females there were 99.5 males, and for every 100 females age 18 and over there were 98.5 males age 18 and over.

100.0% of residents lived in urban areas, while 0.0% lived in rural areas.

There were 9,526 households in Lealman, of which 22.1% had children under the age of 18 living in them. Of all households, 29.0% were married-couple households, 28.0% were households with a male householder and no spouse or partner present, and 33.6% were households with a female householder and no spouse or partner present. About 38.2% of all households were made up of individuals and 16.1% had someone living alone who was 65 years of age or older.

There were 10,679 housing units, of which 10.8% were vacant. The homeowner vacancy rate was 3.5% and the rental vacancy rate was 6.2%.

Racial composition as of the 2020 census
Race	Number	Percent
White	13,581	64.1%
Black or African American	2,401	11.3%
American Indian and Alaska Native	96	0.5%
Asian	1,771	8.4%
Native Hawaiian and Other Pacific Islander	25	0.1%
Some other race	978	4.6%
Two or more races	2,337	11.0%
Hispanic or Latino (of any race)	3,114	14.7%
