= WWSB =

Television station in Sarasota, Florida

- Sarasota–Bradenton–; Venice–North Port, Florida; United States
- City: Sarasota, Florida
- Channels: Digital: 24 (UHF); Virtual: 40
- Branding: ABC 7

Programming
- Affiliations: 40.1: ABC; for others, see § Technical information and subchannels

Ownership
- Owner: Gray Media; (Gray Television Licensee, LLC)

History
- First air date: October 23, 1971
- Former call signs: WXLT-TV (1971–1986)
- Former channel numbers: Analog: 40 (UHF, 1971–2009); Digital: 52 (UHF, 2002–2009)
- Call sign meaning: Sarasota and Bradenton

Technical information
- Licensing authority: FCC
- Facility ID: 61251
- ERP: 90 kW
- HAAT: 234 m (768 ft)
- Transmitter coordinates: 27°33′21″N 82°21′48″W

Links
- Public license information: Public file; LMS
- Website: www.mysuncoast.com

WWSB (channel 40, cable channel 7) is a television station licensed to Sarasota, Florida, United States, serving the Suncoast (including Sarasota, Bradenton, and Venice) as an affiliate of ABC. The station is owned by Gray Media and maintains studios on 10th Street north of downtown Sarasota and a transmitter southeast of Parrish.

Channel 40 began broadcasting on October 23, 1971, as WXLT-TV. Built and owned by the Sarasota–Bradenton Florida Television Company, it filled a gap in ABC network coverage, as the network's Tampa Bay area affiliate of the time, WLCY-TV/WTSP (channel 10), had a transmitter north of the metropolitan area and a weak signal in Sarasota. In 1974, the station gained notoriety when Christine Chubbuck, host of the morning talk show Suncoast Digest, committed suicide live on air. The station was mostly known for its low-budget local news offering and as an alternative for Tampa Bay–area viewers for those times when channel 10 opted not to air a given ABC program. Its coverage of Hurricane Elena in 1985, which prompted evacuation warnings for waterfront areas, was derided as inadequate and exposed weaknesses in the news department.

In 1986, channel 40 was sold to Southern Broadcast Associates, a consortium headed by a former station manager of WTVJ in Miami and owned in part by Calkins Newspapers. The station and news department were overhauled to bring them up to date, including an increase in the news staff and a call sign change to WWSB that November. The station increased its ratings in the Sarasota area and became its highest-rated TV news station. When ABC moved its Tampa Bay affiliation to WFTS-TV in 1994, eliminating the original reason for affiliating with channel 40, the network announced its intent to disaffiliate from WWSB. The station mounted a defense of its affiliation, stating that its ability to provide local news programming to the Suncoast was in peril, and successfully secured a renewal with ABC. In the years that followed, the station introduced new local newscasts and moved from its original studios on Lawton Drive to its present facility near downtown Sarasota. It adopted its present ABC 7 brand in 2004. Calkins exited broadcasting and sold its stations in 2017 to Raycom Media, which merged into Gray in 2019.

== WXLT-TV ==
=== Construction and early years ===
On December 21, 1965, the Sarasota–Bradenton Florida Television Company applied to the Federal Communications Commission (FCC) for permission to build a new television station on UHF channel 47, soon modified to 40, in Sarasota. A second application for the channel was filed by Tamiami T.V., Inc., but it was not pursued by its backers, and the FCC awarded channel 40 to Sarasota–Bradenton Television in August 1967.

Construction plans for the station, given the call sign WXLT-TV, were announced in August 1970, alongside a primary affiliation with the ABC network. ABC had a gap in coverage that the Sarasota station filled. Only some viewers in the area could receive the network's Tampa Bay–area affiliate, WLCY-TV (channel 10). Channel 10 had been allocated to the Tampa Bay area in 1957. Site restrictions related to the assignment, upheld by the FCC to protect Miami's channel 10 station and then-operating UHF station WSUN-TV in St. Petersburg, left WLCY-TV on a shorter tower to the north of the Tampa Bay area, with a coverage area 65 percent the size of the other major stations in the market, WFLA-TV and WTVT.

WXLT-TV began broadcasting on October 24, 1971. It began providing ABC and local programming to 140,000 homes, replacing WLCY-TV on cable television systems in its area. Among its local offerings were local newscasts at 6 and 11 p.m. By 1974, the evening newscast, titled Newswatch, was expanded to an hour, and the station had introduced a morning talk show, Suncoast Digest.

=== Suicide of Christine Chubbuck ===
On July 15, 1974, viewers of Suncoast Digest, as well as two studio guests, witnessed as its host, Christine Chubbuck, ended a newscast leading off the program with an announcement:

"In keeping with the WXLT practice of presenting the most immediate and complete reports of local blood and guts news, TV-40 presents what is believed to be a television first. In living color, an exclusive coverage of an attempted suicide."

Chubbuck then proceeded to shoot herself on the air with a 38-caliber pistol. The remainder of her script contained a news bulletin, to be read in the third person, about Chubbuck being transported to the hospital in critical condition. She was transported to the hospital and died that evening after what was believed to be the first-ever live televised suicide. Suncoast Digest survived Chubbuck's death and remained on the air as of 1977 with the same format, having changed its title to A.M. Gulf Coast. In 1975, a guest died in the channel 40 studio during an airing of A.M. Gulf Coast, though it occurred outside of the view of WXLT's cameras.

=== In channel 10's shadow ===
In September 1979, over objections from channel 10, WXLT-TV moved its transmitter facility to a site closer to Sarasota, 10 miles (16 km) north of Bradenton at Parrish. The new facility provided a stronger ABC signal to sections of Polk County that previously had received little to no ABC network service. That same year, channel 10—which changed its call sign to WTSP in 1978—built a taller tower at its existing site, which WXLT had opposed. In spite of the 1979 upgrade, WTSP continued to float a relocation of its tower to Riverview, which WXLT continued to oppose.

As Sarasota grew, WXLT-TV remained much the same. The station was mostly known for its low-budget local news offering and as an alternative for those times when channel 10 opted not to air a given ABC program. WXLT did not have any full-time weather presenters as late as June 1974, causing the station to be heavily criticized when storms hit Sarasota and Manatee counties and the station failed to broadcast any on-air advisories. Chubbuck, then serving as WXLT public affairs director, told the Sarasota Herald-Tribune, "[w]e have been very lax in giving out weather bulletins ... I think without a doubt, we let the people down."

== WWSB ==
=== Sale to Southern Broadcast ===
In 1985, the Sarasota–Bradenton Television Company began to negotiate the sale of WXLT-TV. The $41 million sale was made public on September 6, 1985. The buyer was Southern Broadcast Associates, a firm headed by Doug Barker, station manager of Miami's WTVJ. The announcement came days after the station's coverage of Hurricane Elena, which was criticized by viewers for being sporadic and failing to provide regularly updated information. The hurricane prompted evacuation warnings for waterfront areas in Sarasota and Manatee counties, but WXLT-TV, which lacked equipment for live news broadcasting outside the studio and was short-staffed, had limited capacity to update its viewers on the situation. Company president Robert Nelson felt that viewers were unfairly comparing WXLT to the larger stations in the Tampa market or to the stations in the multi-affiliate Fort Myers market to the south. Southern Broadcast promised upgrades in the area of news.

The FCC approved the sale to Southern Broadcast in November 1985, but a series of financial complications delayed its consummation. That same month, minority stockholder W. E. Schonek claimed that Southern Broadcast had not made arrangements to acquire the studio facility on Lawton Drive, which he owned with his brother, or the transmitter building, which he owned with Nelson—with whom he had fallen out over a provision in the sale contract giving him a five-year consulting position with WXLT after the sale. Meanwhile, one of Southern Broadcast's investors, part of a Connecticut-based consortium, withdrew his commitment after a family tragedy. As a consequence, Nelson became part of the new ownership group when the deal was completed in March 1986. Schonek's lawsuit was not settled until September 1988, after the case went to a jury trial in which jurors could not agree on a verdict. Calkins Newspapers, a Pennsylvania-based publishing company, acquired 49 percent of the station shortly after the transaction and became the majority owner in 1989.

After taking ownership, Barker set out to retool the station. Barker saw the need to update the station's on-air image. The old NewsCenter 40 news title was replaced with News 40, and a new set and graphics package were instituted. On August 31, the call sign was changed to WWSB, representing Sarasota and Bradenton. The hour-long early evening news was cut to 30 minutes and newscasts added at 7:25 a.m. during Good Morning America and at noon. Anchorman Bob Keehn, who had been with the station since its start, was removed from the evening newscasts in December as part of Barker's push to give the station a more up-to-date news presentation. The news department of 13 employees increased to 18 immediately and 30 by 1990.

With renewed resources and a focus on covering news in the Sarasota–Bradenton area, WWSB's ratings began to increase as viewers turned back to it from the Tampa Bay stations, particularly WTSP. Within 18 months, channel 40 had doubled its audience share in Sarasota County, going from a third-place finish to first place. Barker and vice president and station manager Linda DesMarais exited in 1992 because the other owners in Southern Broadcast had no interest in buying additional TV stations, as they had foreseen at the start of the venture.

=== 1994 affiliation near-loss ===
On May 23, 1994, Fox announced it had agreed to affiliate with 12 stations owned by New World Communications, including WTVT in Tampa, the longtime CBS affiliate. Even though ABC did not need to seek a new affiliate in Tampa Bay, as part of a group agreement with Scripps-Howard Broadcasting, ABC announced on June 17 that it would move to the former Fox affiliate, WFTS-TV (channel 28). The changeover from WTSP to WFTS eliminated the reason that WWSB had been given an ABC affiliation in the first place, as WFTS had a centrally located tower at Riverview. As a result, ABC simultaneously announced its intention to discontinue its affiliation with WWSB.

This left WWSB with two likely scenarios: become a CBS affiliate, as it appeared would happen to WTSP, or become an independent station without a network affiliation or the valuable compensation it brought. When CBS opted to sign WTSP as an affiliate but not WWSB, station president Stan Crumley warned, "Right now, it looks like there is a very good chance that we just won't exist anymore. This is probably one of the most serious situations I have ever been in in my 25 years in broadcasting." Crumley blamed the network's decision to not add WWSB as an affiliate on its need to placate its Fort Myers affiliate, WINK-TV.

In response, WWSB began a legal battle to retain its network affiliation. On July 8, it filed a challenge to the broadcast license of WFTS-TV, alleging that ABC's decision to go with the Scripps-Howard group deal violated FCC rules and that it was conditional on removing WWSB from the network. It also argued that any disaffiliation would reduce the availability of local news programming in the Sarasota–Bradenton area, which it claimed WFTS would not provide. Scripps denied the claims made by WWSB, though ABC chairman Bob Iger made a sworn statement indicating that it was the network's desire to have one affiliate in the Tampa Bay market so as to strengthen WFTS. In early October, ABC sent a six-month disaffiliation notice to WWSB, setting April 2, 1995, as channel 40's last day with the network.

After eight months of negotiations, and with a month to go until the disaffiliation date, WWSB and ABC announced on March 7, 1995, that the station would remain an ABC affiliate under a new three-year deal that permitted an extension dependent on WWSB's delivery of viewers to ABC World News Tonight and Nightline. In the years following the new pact, WWSB expanded its local news offerings. A 5 p.m. newscast, First News at Five, debuted in 1995; this was followed by a morning newscast, News 40 Sunrise, which debuted in 1998 as a 30-minute program and was expanded to an hour in 2002.

In 1997, five Black women and the Manatee County branch of the NAACP challenged the renewal of WWSB's license, claiming they had been denied opportunities to anchor. The NAACP complaint alleged that in the station's 25-year history, it had never had a Black anchor, even though it had at least two in the 1970s, including Ed James, who went on to host the long-running public affairs program Black Almanac. One of the challengers was Vickie Oldham, host of the WWSB public affairs program Common Ground, who claimed decreasing support for the program. She alleged having been told by manager Manny Calvo that the mostly White Sarasota area precluded a Black anchor, with a better chance of doing so in a market with a larger Black population. The FCC upheld the renewal of the license in 2001, but Oldham credited the petition with spurring the station to hire more people of color.

=== Move to downtown Sarasota ===
In March 2000, WWSB broke ground on a new facility at 10th Street and Lemon Avenue, on the northern edge of downtown Sarasota. The new facility was designed for digital production and provided additional space for the growing station.

WWSB switched from branding as channel 40 to "ABC 7" using its number on local cable systems, in March 2004. The rebrand included a variation of the circle 7 logo associated with ABC affiliates in other cities. In 2014 and 2015, the station launched a lifestyle show, Suncoast View, and a 7 p.m. newscast hosted by Alan Cohn.

On April 11, 2016, it was reported that Calkins would exit the broadcasting industry and sell its stations to Raycom Media. The sale was completed on April 30, 2017. Raycom Media then merged with Gray Television in a $3.65 billion deal announced in 2018 and completed on January 2, 2019.

==== Notable former on-air staff ====
- Christine Chubbuck – host of Suncoast Digest, 1973–1974
- Alan Cohn – 7 p.m. anchor
- Brad Giffen – anchor, 2003–2008
- Kevin Negandhi – sports anchor, 1999–2002 and 2004–2006
- Craig Sager – sportscaster, 1970s

== Technical information and subchannels ==
WWSB's transmitter is located southeast of Parrish, Florida. The station's signal is multiplexed:

Subchannels of WWSB
| Subchannel | Res. | Short name | Programming |
|---|---|---|---|
| 40.1 | 720p | WWSB-HD | ABC |
| 40.2 | 480i | Outlaw | Outlaw |
| 40.3 | 480i | DEFY | Defy |
| 40.4 | 480i | The365 | 365BLK |

WWSB began broadcasting a digital signal on channel 52 on November 1, 2002. Compared to the analog facility, WWSB-DT covered additional area to the north. It ceased analog broadcasting on February 1, 2009, in order to remove the second antenna and transmission line in time to begin post-transition digital telecasting on February 17, using its assigned channel 24.

== See also ==
- Channel 7 branded TV stations in the United States
- Channel 24 digital TV stations in the United States
- Channel 40 virtual TV stations in the United States
