= The Beaver County Times =

Daily newspaper published in Beaver, Pennsylvania, United States

Coordinates: 40.700342°N 80.298106°W

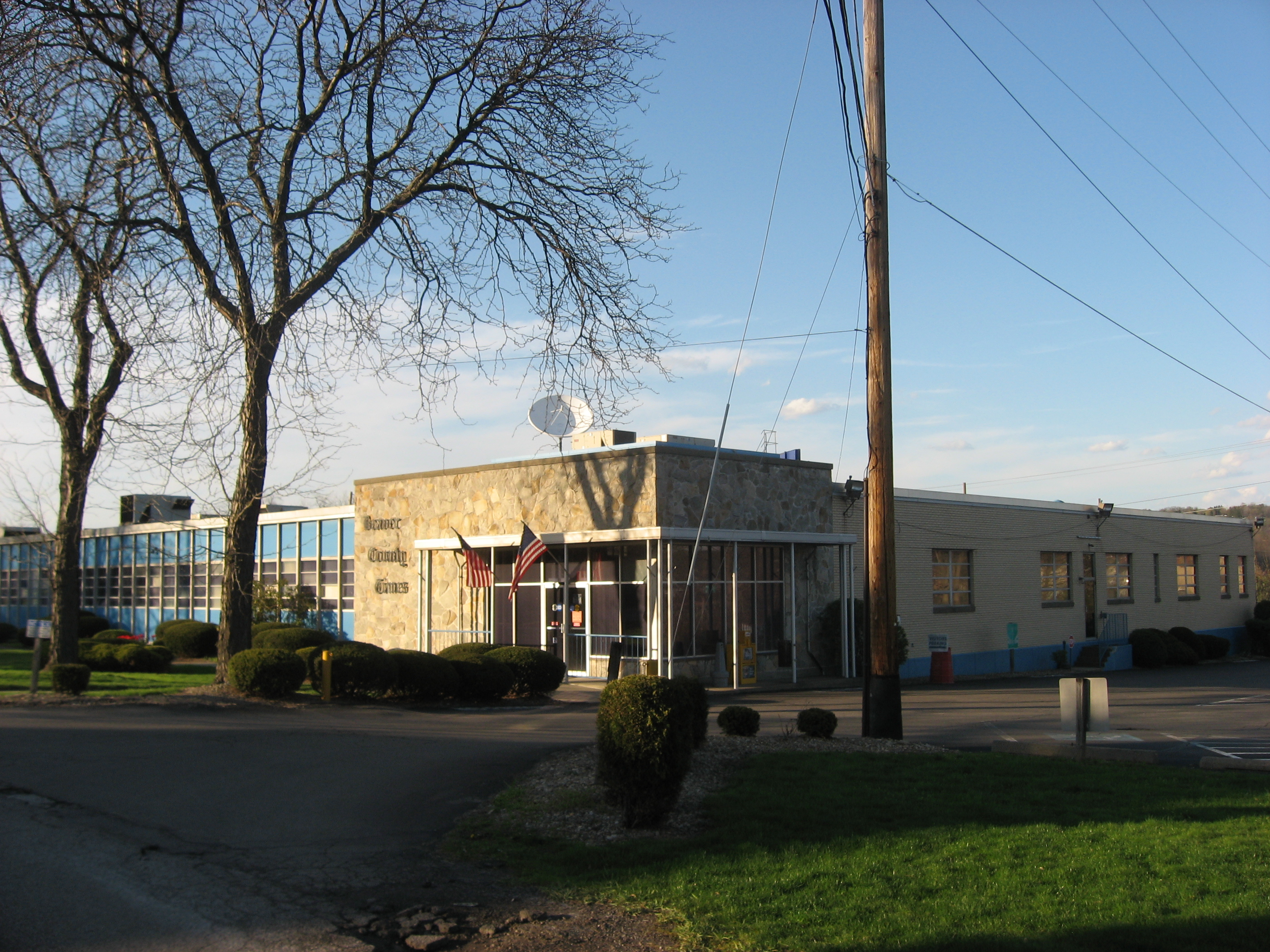
- Offices of the Times in Bridgewater
- Type: Daily newspaper
- Owner: USA Today Co.
- Founder: Michael Weyland
- Founded: 1807; 219 years ago (As Beaver Minerva)
- Language: English
- Headquarters: Aliquippa, Pennsylvania
- Country: United States
- OCLC number: 14348988
- Website: timesonline.com

The Beaver County Times is a daily newspaper published in Aliquippa, Pennsylvania, United States, serving suburban Beaver County northwest of Pittsburgh. It is the sole newspaper covering Beaver County. The Times has previously produced several online video series, including its flagship news program The Times Today, Game On, History in a Minute, Get Out This Weekend, and more. Archival issues of The Beaver County Times can be viewed online at Google News.

== History ==
The Times is the result of the merger of many of Beaver County's newspapers, starting with the Beaver Minerva, first published in 1807 and generally believed to have been the county's first newspaper. The Beaver Times was founded by Michael Weyland and was published from 1851 to 1895, when the name was changed to the Beaver Argus. It was changed again to The Daily Times from 1909 to 1946. It was sold in 1946 to S. W. Calkins, who combined it with his 1943 acquisition Aliquippa Gazette. This paper was known as The Beaver Valley Times until 1957, when it became The Beaver County Times after its acquisition of the Ambridge Daily Citizen. In 1979, The Times purchased the last remaining competing daily newspaper in the county, The News Tribune of Beaver Falls. In April 1997, the paper switched from an evening print to morning.

Times owner Calkins Media was acquired by GateHouse Media in 2017, and GateHouse was merged into Gannett in 2019. Since 2017, The Beaver County Times has experienced massive cuts in staff, as well as the newspaper's coverage.
