= Calkins Media =

American media company

Calkins Media, Inc. was a media company established in 1937. It included daily newspapers and digital sites in Pennsylvania and New Jersey, a weekly newspaper in South Miami-Dade County, and broadcast stations located in Huntsville, Tallahassee and Sarasota. Corporate and digital headquarters were located in Bucks County.

In 2016, Raycom Media agreed to purchase Calkins Media's three television stations. A sale of WAAY-TV to Raycom affiliate American Spirit Media was blocked by the Department of Justice due to Raycom's ownership of WAFF. Raycom closed on the purchase of WWSB and WTXL-TV on May 1, 2017, while WAAY-TV was instead sold to Heartland Media.

In 2017, GateHouse Media and Ogden Newspapers agreed to terms to purchase Calkins Media's newspaper assets.

== Former assets ==
=== Newspapers ===
- The Beaver County Times - (now owned by Gannett)
- Bucks County Courier Times - (PA) - (now owned by Gannett)
- Burlington County Times (NJ) - (now owned by Gannett)
- Ellwood City Ledger - (now owned by Gannett)
- Greene County Messenger - (now owned by Ogden Newspapers)
- (Uniontown, PA) The Herald-Standard - (now owned by Ogden Newspapers)
- South Dade News Leader - (now owned by South Dade News, Inc.)
- The Intelligencer (Doylestown, Pennsylvania) - (now owned by Gannett)

=== Television stations ===
Stations arranged alphabetically by state and by city of license.

Stations owned by Calkins Media
Media market	State	Station	Purchased	Sold	Notes
Huntsville	Alabama	WAAY-TV	2007	2017	
Sarasota, Florida	Florida	WWSB	1986	2017	(Note: The station is licensed to Sarasota, which is part of the Tampa market. However, WWSB does not serve all of the Tampa/St. Petersburg area as the ABC affiliate (WFTS serves the Tampa metro area, WWSB serves the southern portion of the market). The station also serves portions of the Fort Myers market.)
Tallahassee	Florida	WTXL-TV	2005	2017	
