= The Gettysburgian =

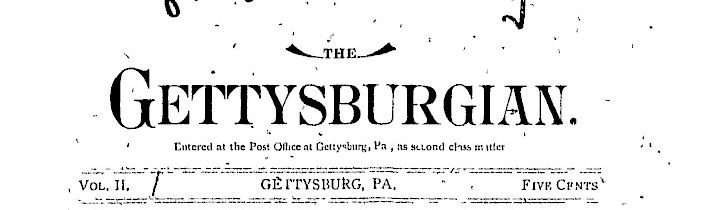
- Type: Monthly
- Format: Broadsheet
- School: Gettysburg College
- Owner: Gettysburg College
- Publisher: Gettysburg College
- Editor-in-chief: Vincent DiFonzo
- Managing editor: Ella Prieto
- News editor: Brandon Fey
- Opinion editor: Terra Hobler
- Photo editor: Will Oehler
- Features Editor: Sophie Lange
- Founded: 1897
- Language: English
- Headquarters: Gettysburg College, Gettysburg, Pennsylvania
- City: Gettysburg
- Country: United States
- Website: gettysburgian.com
- Free online archives: issuu.com/thegettysburgian

The Gettysburgian is the monthly student magazine and digital publication for Gettysburg College in Gettysburg, Pennsylvania, United States. Originally called the Weekly Gettysburgian and first published in 1897, it currently provides local and campus news for the student population. The Gettysburgian is entirely run by students, who maintain editorial control over the publication.

== History ==
The Gettysburgian was founded in 1897 and published its first issue on March 16 of that year. It has published consistently since then, making it Gettysburg College's oldest active student organization.

In 2012, the Gettysburgian launched their website. During the summer of 2019, the editorial staff of The Gettysburgian decided to switch from a weekly newspaper to a monthly magazine to encourage higher readership among students. The Gettysburgian splits its content into five sections: News, Arts & Entertainment, Sports, Opinions, and Features. The Gettysburgian publishes three magazine issues per semester and six per year.

All articles are published on the publication's website, which is updated daily.

== Notable writers ==
- Bill Fleischman, sports journalist and professor

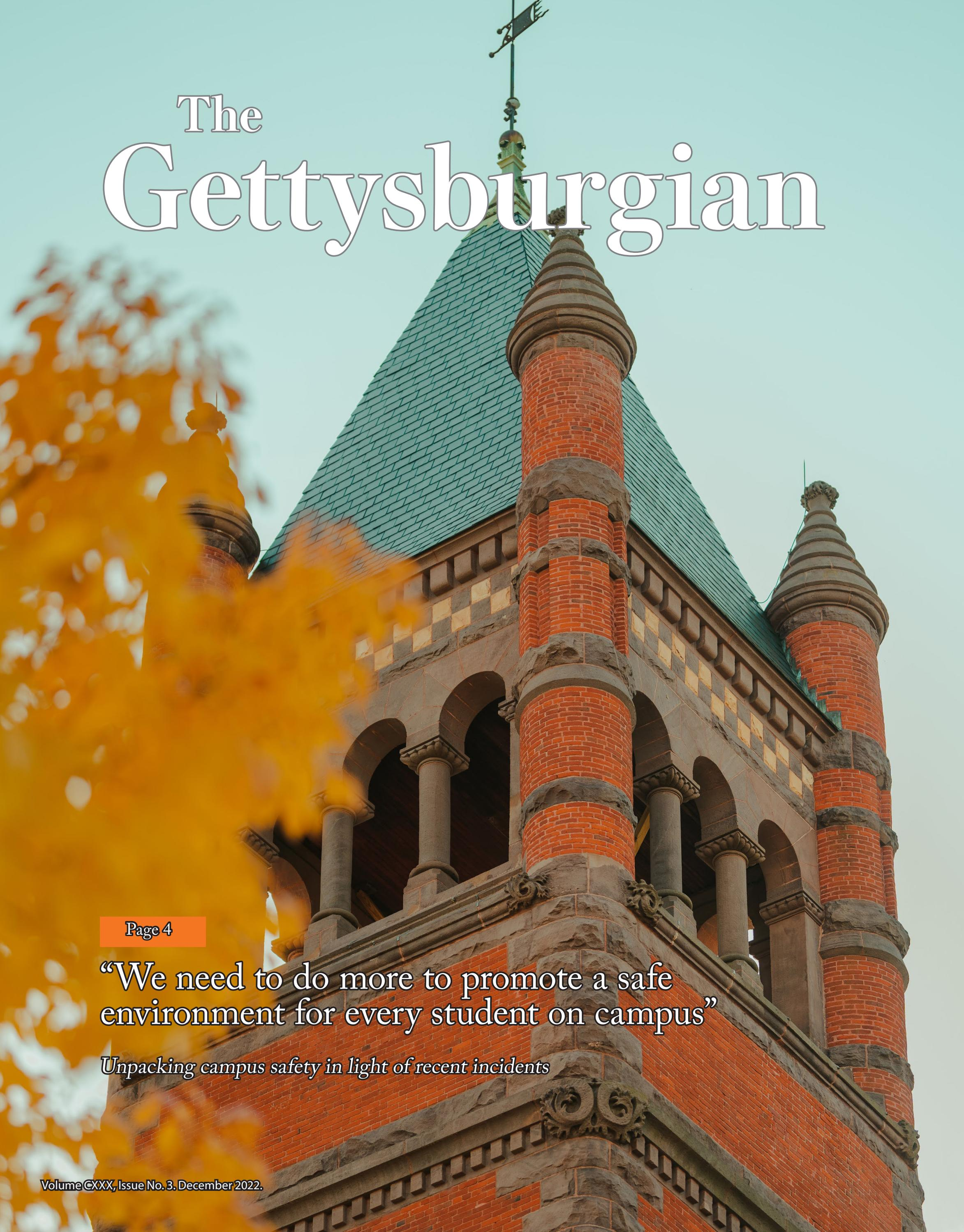
December 2022 edition of the Gettysburgian magazine
