= Bill Fleischman =

American sports journalist (1939–2019)

- Born: April 8, 1939; Chester, Pennsylvania, US
- Died: May 1, 2019 (aged 80); Wilmington, Delaware, US
- Education: Gettysburg College
- Occupations: Journalist, writer, professor
- Known for: Philadelphia Daily News; The News Journal; Burlington County Times

William R. Fleischman Jr. (April 8, 1939 – May 1, 2019) was an American sports journalist. During the 1960s, he worked at The News Journal and the Burlington County Times after graduating from Gettysburg College. He reported for the Philadelphia Daily News from 1969 to 2005, and eventually became its assistant sports editor. During the 1970s, he wrote regularly on the Philadelphia Flyers when the team won two Stanley Cups, and co-authored a biography for the team's goaltender Bernie Parent. Fleischman also served as president of the Professional Hockey Writers' Association from 1979 to 1981, and was president of the Philadelphia Sports Writers Association from 1990 to 1992. He was a regular attendee for NASCAR events and co-authored several editions of The Unauthorized NASCAR Fan Guide. In addition to newspaper work, he taught journalism at the University of Delaware for 28 years, was a commentator for a sports talk show on Comcast, and was the historian for the Delaware Sports Museum and Hall of Fame.

== Early career ==
William R. Fleischman Jr. was born in Chester, Pennsylvania on April 8, 1939. He grew up in the Philadelphia area and graduated from Germantown High School in 1956. He completed an English degree with a minor in history at Gettysburg College in 1960, where he wrote for the student newspaper, The Gettysburgian, and hosted a radio show called "Bullet Bill's Bandstand". He was the sports editor of the Burlington County Times from 1961 to 1966, then worked with Al Cartwright as the sports editor for The News Journal from 1966 to 1969.

== Philadelphia Daily News ==
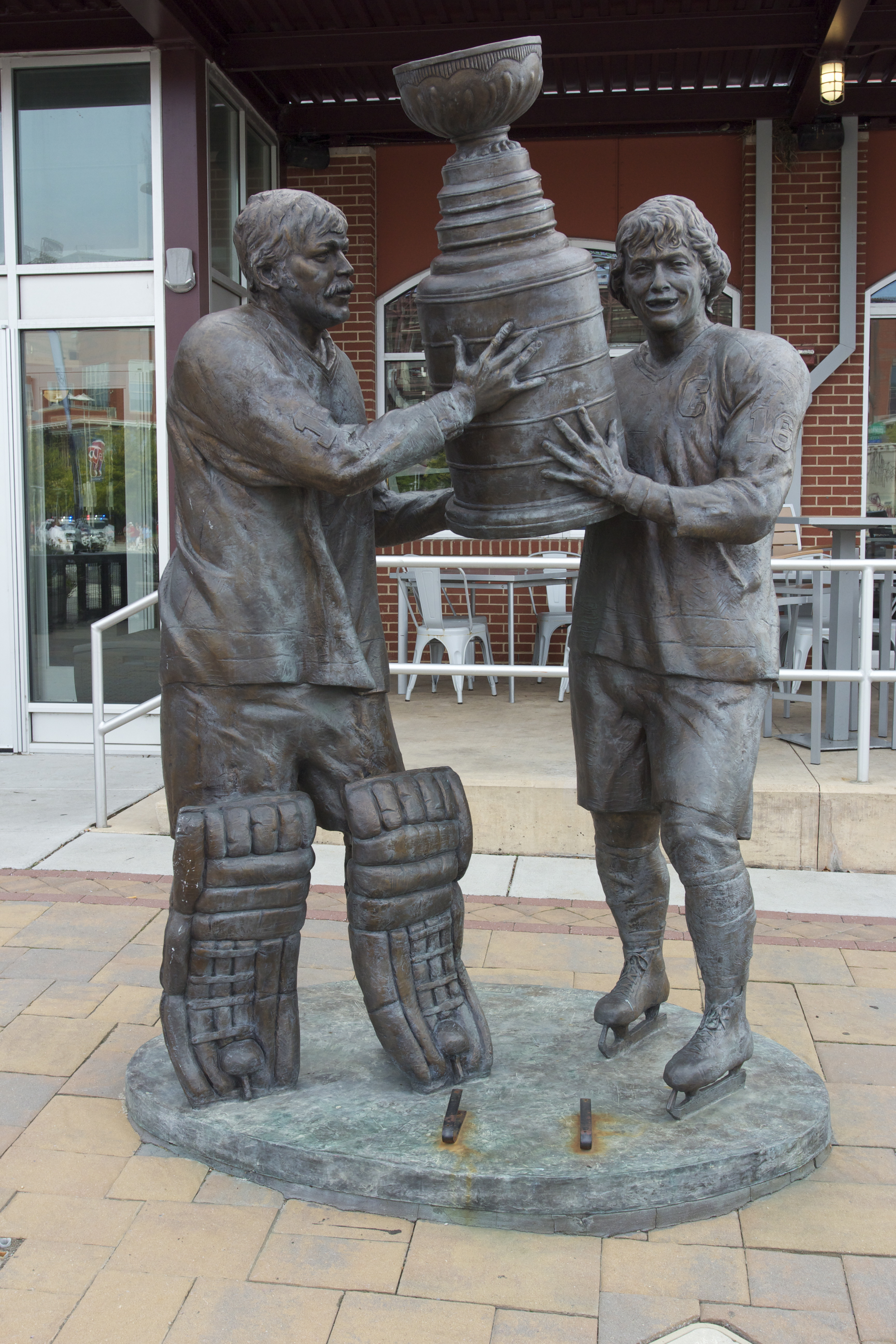
Statue of Bernie Parent and Bobby Clarke depicting a Stanley Cup victory, c. 1974 – c. 1975

Fleischman wrote for the Philadelphia Daily News from 1969 to 2005. He began as a general sports writer, became a desk editor, and then the assistant sports editor. His regular topics included coverage for the Philadelphia Flyers, auto racing, Drexel Dragons men's basketball, the US Open Tennis Championships, and The Championships, Wimbledon. He was a regular attendee for NASCAR events held at the Dover Motor Speedway, and co-authored several editions of The Unauthorized NASCAR Fan Guide, an almanac of facts and figures.

During the 1970s, Fleischman wrote regularly on the Flyers when the team was nicknamed the "Broad Street Bullies", and won Stanley Cups in 1974 and 1975. Daily News colleague Ray Didinger recalled that after the 1974 Stanley Cup championship parade, Fleischman stated that he heard an advertisement on the radio which said, "And be sure to pick up tomorrow's Daily News to read Bill Fleischman's story about how this Flyers championship team was built". Fleischman had planned to write a "fun and easy" article about the parade, instead of a lengthier article on the history of the team. Despite exhaustion from not having a day off in weeks and a rapidly-approaching publishing deadline, Didinger credited him for remaining calm instead of confronting the paper's editors, and having "just sat down and wrote a thoroughly detailed piece that read like he spent weeks researching it".

Fleischman and Sonny Schwartz co-authored a biography for Flyers' goaltender Bernie Parent, titled Bernie, Bernie, published in 1975. Fleischman was elected vice-president of the Professional Hockey Writers' Association in 1977, then served as its president from 1979 to 1981. He later served as vice-president of the Philadelphia Sports Writers Association from 1988 to 1990, and was its president from 1990 to 1992.

In 2005, Fleischman retired from full-time work with the Daily News, then continued to write as a correspondent for NASCAR and Drexel basketball.

== Later career ==
After retiring from full-time work, Fleischman was a commentator on Daily News Live, a sports talk television show broadcast on Comcast. He also co-ordinated the scheduling of other panelists on the show. He later served as the historian for the Delaware Sports Museum and Hall of Fame, and wrote biographies for the inductees.

== University of Delaware ==
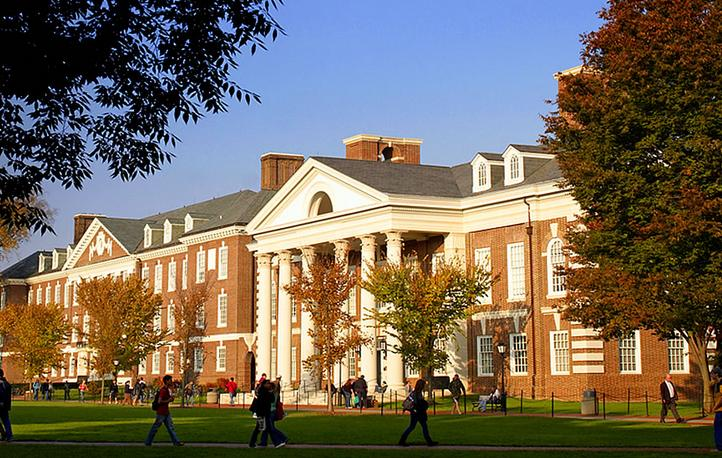
University of Delaware campus

Fleischman began working as an adjunct professor for journalism at the University of Delaware in 1981, and taught at the school for 28 years, where he shared his newspapers experiences and articles in classes. Jeff Gluck felt that Fleischman wanted students to think outside the box, and stated that, "He really wanted to push you and say, here's what you should do. Don't settle for this, be fair, but be creative. It would really bother him when people would settle for the mundane, routine stuff. He had a way of challenging you and pushing you, but in the kindest way possible".

As of 2019, the University of Delaware offered a stipend of US$1,000 named for Fleischman, given to a student with an internship in sports journalism or copy editing.

== Reputation ==
Jeff Pearlman wrote that, "The reason [Fleischman was] so well regarded for his time as a beat writer with the Flyers, is because he was such a decent guy". Flyers' team captain Bobby Clarke felt, "There was no harshness, no vindictiveness [in his work]. He wasn't ever out to get somebody". Wayne Fish wrote in The Morning Call that, "[Fleischman] understood what it meant for blue-collar fans to relate to a blue-collar team", and that, "His sharp wit, his ability to boil events down to a single purpose is what made for such compelling reading".

== Personal life ==
Fleischman met his wife, Barbara, while taking a modern poetry course at Gettysburg College. He later jokingly said to his wife, "I'm the only thing you ever got out of that class".

The Fleischmans moved to Wilmington, Delaware and were married for 57 years. They had two daughters, one of whom died at age 21 in a car accident. They established a scholarship in her name at Syracuse University, given annually to a female journalism student.

Fleischman died from cancer on May 1, 2019, in Wilmington.
