= Shayan Modarres =

American activist and attorney (born 1984)

Shayan Modarres (born May 15, 1984) is an Iranian American, civil rights activist and attorney in Orlando, Florida. He is originally from the Washington, D.C./Maryland metropolitan area. He has assisted in the representation of the family of Trayvon Martin since 2012. He was a Democratic candidate for United States House of Representatives for Florida's 10th Congressional District in the 2014 midterm election.

== Early life ==
Modarres was born in Silver Spring, Maryland to immigrant parents who moved to the United States from Iran in the 1970s. His father worked as a statistics professor before retiring from American University in 2013. His mother works in IT/security for one of the nation's largest healthcare providers. Modarres graduated from American University with a degree in pre-law and political science, and later graduated cum laude from Florida A&M University College of Law.

== Political career ==
Modarres is a former Democratic candidate for United States House of Representatives for Florida's 10th Congressional District. He was attempting to unseat the incumbent, Republican Daniel Webster, in the 2014 midterm election. Modarres was endorsed by the Orlando Sentinel in the Democratic primary.
