= 2022 Florida Chief Financial Officer election =

2022 Chief Financial Officer of Florida election
- November 8, 2022
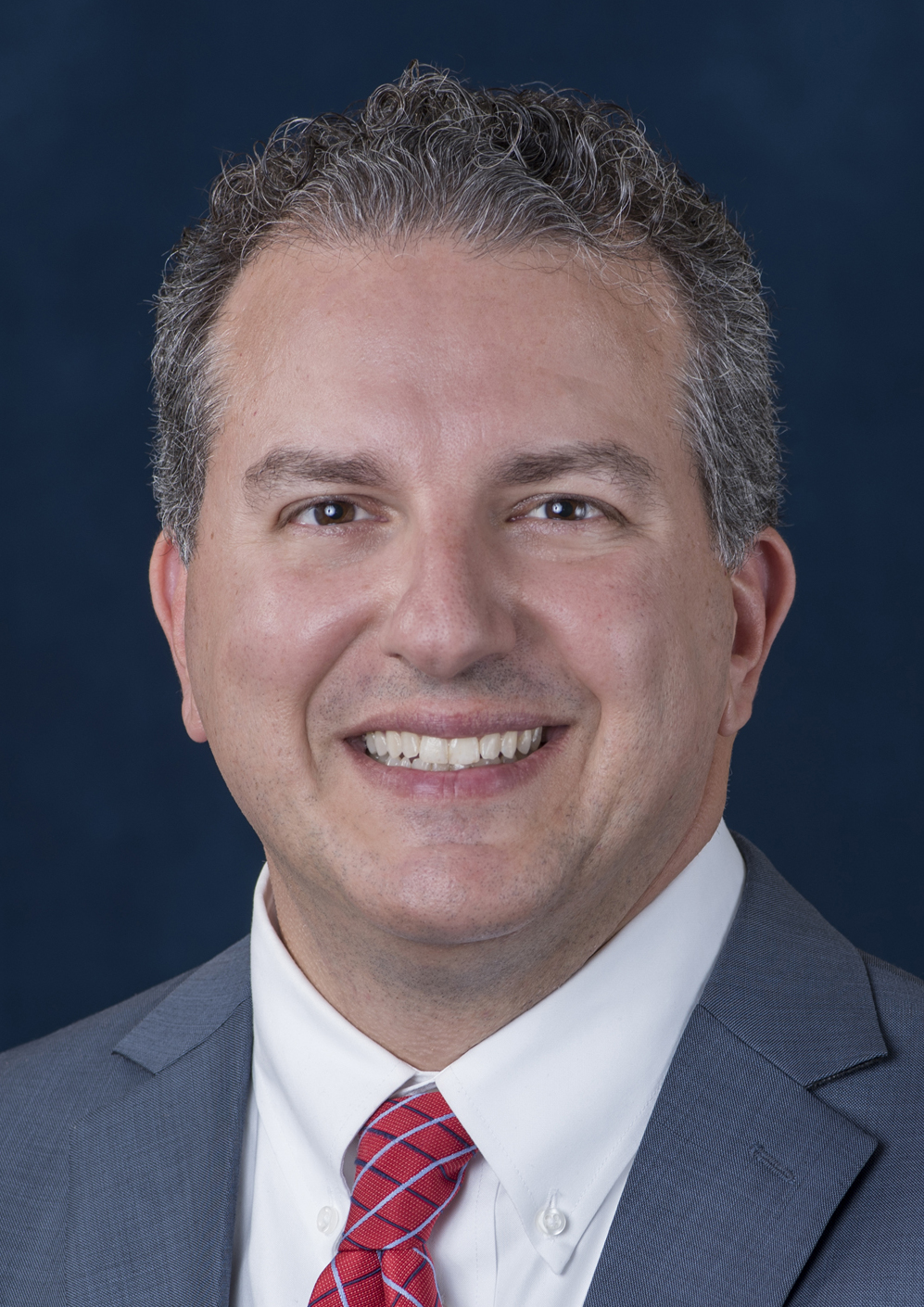

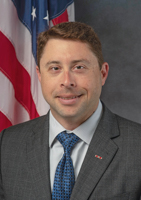
Nominee	Jimmy Patronis	Adam Hattersley
Party	Republican	Democratic
Popular vote	4,528,811	3,085,697
Percentage	59.48%	40.52%
- Patronis: 50–60% 60–70% 70–80% 80–90% >90% Hattersley: 50–60% 60–70% 70–80% 80–90% >90% Tie: 50% No votes
CFO before election
Jimmy Patronis
Republican
Elected CFO
Jimmy Patronis
Republican

The 2022 Florida Chief Financial Officer election was held on November 8, 2022, to elect the Chief Financial Officer of Florida. Incumbent Republican CFO Jimmy Patronis won re-election to a second term with over 59% of the vote and a margin of victory of 19 percentage points.

== Republican primary ==
=== Candidates ===
==== Nominee ====
- Jimmy Patronis, incumbent Chief Financial Officer of Florida

=== Endorsements ===
Jimmy Patronis

Federal officials

- Donald Trump, former President of the United States

State officials

- Ron DeSantis, Governor of Florida
- Ashley Moody, Florida Attorney General

Local officials

- 60 sheriffs

Organizations

- Florida Chamber of Commerce
- National Federation of Independent Business Florida PAC

== Democratic primary ==
=== Candidates ===
==== Nominee ====
- Adam Hattersley, former state representative and candidate for Florida's 15th congressional district in 2020

==== Did not qualify ====
- Tyrone Javellana, accountant

==== Withdrawn ====
- Karla Jones

==== Declined ====
- Lauren Book, minority leader of the Florida Senate

=== Endorsements ===
Adam Hattersley

Statewide officials

- Alex Sink, former Chief Financial Officer of Florida

Organizations

- Sierra Club (post primary)

Labor unions

- 1199SEIU United Healthcare Workers East
- Service Employees International Union Florida

== Independent and third party candidates ==
=== Independent candidates ===
==== Withdrawn ====
- Richard Dembinsky, perennial candidate

==== Did not qualify ====
- Benjamin Horbowy

== General election ==
=== Polling ===
Poll source	Date(s) administered	Sample size (Note: Key: A – all adults RV – registered voters LV – likely voters V – unclear)	Margin of error	Jimmy Patronis (R)	Adam Hattersley (D)	Undecided
Mason-Dixon Polling & Strategy	September 26–28, 2022	800 (LV)	± 3.5%	47%	37%	16%

=== Results ===
State Senate district results

State House district results

2022 Florida Chief Financial Officer election
Party	Candidate	Votes	%	±%
Republican	Jimmy Patronis (incumbent)	4,528,811	59.48%	+7.74%
Democratic	Adam Hattersley	3,085,697	40.52%	−7.74%
Total votes		7,614,508	100.0%	
Republican hold				

==== By county ====
2022 Florida Chief Financial Officer election (by county)
County	Jimmy Patronis Republican		Adam Hattersley Democratic	
County	#	%	#	%
Alachua	39,927	42.48%	54,069	57.52%
Baker	9,219	88.87%	1,155	11.13%
Bay	53,919	80.68%	12,913	19,32%
Bradford	8,141	81.14%	1,892	18.86%
Brevard	167,742	64.11%	93,923	35.89%
Broward	243,960	41.55%	343,187	58.45%
Calhoun	4,151	85.92%	680	14.08%
Charlotte	63,646	70.48%	26,661	29.52%
Citrus	55,481	74.49%	19,001	25.51%
Clay	66,731	75.00%	22,248	25.00%
Collier	115,445	72.07%	44,736	27.93%
Columbia	18,349	78.58%	5,002	21.42%
DeSoto	6,371	74.88%	2,137	25.12%
Dixie	5,066	85.98%	826	14.02%
Duval	181,195	55.89%	142,996	44.11%
Escambia	73,747	64.93%	39,825	35.07%
Flagler	38,298	66.51%	19,281	33.49%
Franklin	4,031	74.86%	1,354	25.14%
Gadsden	6,694	38.84%	10,542	61.16%
Gilchrist	6,551	85.84%	1,081	14.16%
Glades	2,963	79.18%	779	20.82%
Gulf	5,217	81.57%	1,179	18.43%
Hamilton	3,055	72.24%	1,174	27.76%
Hardee	4,409	81.53%	999	18.47%
Hendry	5,919	73.25%	2,161	26.75%
Hernando	55,110	69.93%	23,702	30.07%
Highlands	28,872	73.76%	10,273	26.24%
Hillsborough	257,725	54.29%	217,007	45.71%
Holmes	6,201	92.03%	537	7.97%
Indian River	50,597	67.54%	24,489	32.46%
Jackson	12,394	76.34%	3,841	23.66%
Jefferson	4,318	61.55%	2,697	38.45%
Lafayette	2,555	88.87%	320	11.13%
Lake	104,794	66.75%	52,205	33.25%
Lee	183,419	68.49%	84,378	31.51%
Leon	51,663	44.69%	63,931	55.31%
Levy	13,738	77.77%	3,926	22.23%
Liberty	2,220	85.62%	373	14.38%
Madison	4,608	66.82%	2,288	33.18%
Manatee	109,967	65.14%	58,841	34.86%
Marion	105,610	68.99%	47,470	31.01%
Martin	52,616	69.23%	23,385	30.77%
Miami-Dade	383,095	55.19%	311,005	44.81%
Monroe	20,188	60.84%	12,992	39.16%
Nassau	36,222	77.23%	10,682	22.77%
Okaloosa	61,233	76.78%	18,251	23.22%
Okeechobee	8,428	79.46%	2,179	20.54%
Orange	184,797	46.39%	213,592	53.61%
Osceola	52,405	51.90%	48,569	48.10%
Palm Beach	271,302	50.85%	262,203	49.15%
Pasco	145,736	66.00%	75,064	34.00%
Pinellas	227,876	54.94%	186,915	45.06%
Polk	145,102	64.44%	80,060	35.56%
Putnam	19,735	75.60%	6,369	24.40%
St. Johns	99,544	70.22%	42,218	29.78%
St. Lucie	69,913	58.51%	49,572	41.49%
Santa Rosa	59,386	79.59%	15,227	20.41%
Sarasota	130,984	61.26%	82,846	38.74%
Seminole	100,090	56.08%	78,391	43.92%
Sumter	64,047	73.18%	23,472	26.82%
Suwannee	13,342	82.46%	2,838	17.54%
Taylor	6,190	82.05%	1,354	17.95%
Union	3,894	86.63%	601	13.37%
Volusia	140,870	63.62%	80,568	36.38%
Wakulla	11,051	74.37%	3,809	25.63%
Walton	28,572	82.81%	5,931	17.19%
Washington	7,815	86.16%	1,255	13.84%
Totals	4,528,811	59.48%	3,085,697	40.52%

Counties that flipped from Democratic to Republican

- Hillsborough (largest municipality: Tampa)
- Miami-Dade (largest city: Miami)
- Osceola (largest municipality: Kissimmee)
- Palm Beach (largest city: West Palm Beach)
- St. Lucie (largest city: Port St. Lucie)

==== By congressional district ====
Patronis won 21 of 28 congressional districts, including one that elected a Democrat.

District	Patronis	Hattersley	Representative
1st	73%	27%	Matt Gaetz
2nd	64%	36%	Neal Dunn
3rd	64%	36%	Kat Cammack
4th	61%	39%	Aaron Bean
5th	66%	34%	John Rutherford
6th	68%	32%	Michael Waltz
7th	60%	40%	Stephanie Murphy (117th Congress)
7th	60%	40%	Cory Mills (118th Congress)
8th	65%	35%	Bill Posey
9th	49.9%	50.1%	Darren Soto
10th	41%	59%	Val Demings (117th Congress)
10th	41%	59%	Maxwell Frost (118th Congress)
11th	63%	37%	Daniel Webster
12th	70%	30%	Gus Bilirakis
13th	58%	42%	Anna Paulina Luna
14th	47%	53%	Kathy Castor
15th	59%	41%	Laurel Lee
16th	62%	38%	Vern Buchanan
17th	65%	35%	Greg Steube
18th	69%	31%	Scott Franklin
19th	69%	31%	Byron Donalds
20th	29%	71%	Sheila Cherfilus-McCormick
21st	62%	38%	Brian Mast
22nd	48%	52%	Lois Frankel
23rd	50.1%	49.9%	Jared Moskowitz
24th	31%	69%	Frederica Wilson
25th	47%	53%	Debbie Wasserman Schultz
26th	70%	30%	Mario Díaz-Balart
27th	58%	42%	María Elvira Salazar
28th	63%	37%	Carlos A. Giménez

== See also ==
- Chief Financial Officer of Florida
