= Oak Ridge, Florida =

Unincorporated area in Florida, US

- Census-designated place
- Location in Orange County and the state of Florida
- Coordinates: 28°28′22″N 81°25′01″W
- Country: United States
- State: Florida
- County: Orange

Area
  - Total: 3.73 sq mi (9.66 km^{2})
  - Land: 3.55 sq mi (9.19 km^{2})
  - Water: 0.18 sq mi (0.47 km^{2})
- Elevation: 102 ft (31 m)

Population (2020)
  - Total: 25,062
  - Density: 7,062.0/sq mi (2,726.66/km^{2})
- Time zone: UTC-5 (Eastern (EST))
  - Summer (DST): UTC-4 (EDT)
- FIPS code: 12-50638
- GNIS feature ID: 2403364

Oak Ridge is a census-designated place and unincorporated area in Orange County, Florida, United States. As of the 2020 census, Oak Ridge had a population of 25,062. It is part of the Orlando–Kissimmee–Sanford, Florida Metropolitan Statistical Area.

== Geography ==
According to the United States Census Bureau, the CDP has a total area of 3.7 square miles (9.7 km^{2}), of which 3.6 square miles (9.2 km^{2}) is land and 0.19 square miles (0.5 km^{2}) (4.87%) is water.

== Demographics ==
Historical population
Census	Pop.	Note	%±
1980	15,477		—
1990	15,388		−0.6%
2000	22,349		45.2%
2010	22,685		1.5%
2020	25,062		10.5%

=== 2020 census ===
As of the 2020 census, Oak Ridge had a population of 25,062. The median age was 31.9 years. 27.5% of residents were under the age of 18 and 9.3% of residents were 65 years of age or older. For every 100 females there were 98.9 males, and for every 100 females age 18 and over there were 96.3 males age 18 and over.

100.0% of residents lived in urban areas, while 0.0% lived in rural areas.

There were 7,998 households in Oak Ridge, of which 43.2% had children under the age of 18 living in them. Of all households, 35.5% were married-couple households, 21.2% were households with a male householder and no spouse or partner present, and 33.1% were households with a female householder and no spouse or partner present. About 18.5% of all households were made up of individuals and 4.1% had someone living alone who was 65 years of age or older.

There were 8,438 housing units, of which 5.2% were vacant. The homeowner vacancy rate was 0.8% and the rental vacancy rate was 5.5%.

Racial composition as of the 2020 census
Race	Number	Percent
White	4,288	17.1%
Black or African American	9,339	37.3%
American Indian and Alaska Native	272	1.1%
Asian	817	3.3%
Native Hawaiian and Other Pacific Islander	38	0.2%
Some other race	5,722	22.8%
Two or more races	4,586	18.3%
Hispanic or Latino (of any race)	12,780	51.0%

=== 2000 census ===
As of the 2000 census, there were 22,349 people, 7,389 households, and 5,379 families residing in the CDP. The population density was 2,074.3/km^{2} (5,370.9/mi^{2}). There were 7,791 housing units at an average density of 723.1/km^{2} (1,872.3/mi^{2}). The racial makeup of the CDP was 43.08% White, 28.44% African American, 0.41% Native American, 5.67% Asian, 0.29% Pacific Islander, 13.92% from other races, and 8.19% from two or more races. Hispanic or Latino of any race were 41.42% of the population.

There were 7,389 households, out of which 41.5% had children under the age of 18 living with them, 43.0% were married couples living together, 21.4% had a female householder with no husband present, and 27.2% were non-families. 18.0% of all households were made up of individuals, and 2.5% had someone living alone who was 65 years of age or older. The average household size was 3.02 and the average family size was 3.40.

In the CDP, the population was spread out, with 29.6% under the age of 18, 12.7% from 18 to 24, 34.9% from 25 to 44, 17.5% from 45 to 64, and 5.3% who were 65 years of age or older. The median age was 29 years. For every 100 females, there were 101.9 males. For every 100 females age 18 and over, there were 101.0 males.

The median income for a household in the CDP was $30,290, and the median income for a family was $31,422. Males had a median income of $21,991 versus $18,573 for females. The per capita income for the CDP was $12,347. About 17.2% of families and 19.6% of the population were below the poverty line, including 25.9% of those under age 18 and 11.6% of those age 65 or over.
