= Adam Hattersley =

American politician and author from Florida

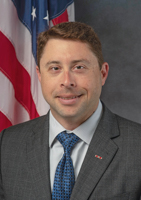

Member of the Florida House of Representatives from the 59th district
- In office November 6, 2018 – November 3, 2020
- Preceded by: Ross Spano
- Succeeded by: Andrew Learned

Personal details
- Born: March 24, 1978 (age 48)
- Party: Independent (before 2018); Democratic (2018–present)
- Spouse: Christie Mangan
- Education: University of Michigan, Ann Arbor (BS, MS)

Military service
- Allegiance: United States
- Branch/service: United States Navy
- Years of service: 2000–2008
- Rank: Lieutenant
- Unit: USS Columbus (SSN-762); 402nd Civil Affairs Battalion
- Battles/wars: Iraq War
- Awards: Bronze Star Medal

Adam Roger Hattersley (born March 24, 1978) is an American politician and author who was a member of the Florida House of Representatives from the 59th district in Hillsborough County from 2018 to 2020. He ran for Chief Financial Officer of Florida in the 2022 election.

He is an engineer, small business owner, and internationally certified men's gymnastics judge and he earned a Bronze Star for his service in the U.S. Navy during the Iraq War.

== Education ==
Hattersley received his Bachelor of Engineering and Master of Science in Engineering in aerospace engineering from the University of Michigan. He was a member of the men's gymnastics team at the University of Michigan, and was on Michigan's 1999 NCAA national championship team. Today, Hattersley is an internationally certified judge for men's gymnastics.

== Military service ==
After receiving his master's degree in engineering, Hattersley joined the United States Navy as an officer in the year 2000. He served as a nuclear submarine officer on the USS Columbus, and then as an electrical engineering instructor at the United States Naval Academy. In 2006, he deployed for Operation Iraqi Freedom, and received a Bronze Star for his service.

== Political career ==
=== Florida House of Representatives ===
Hattersley was elected to the 59th district of the Florida House of Representatives in the general election on November 6, 2018, winning 51 percent of the vote to Republican candidate Joe Wicker's 49 percent. He was the first Democrat to win in Florida's 59th state house district since the seat was drawn in 2012.

He is the author of the book Accidental Politician, published June 2021, an autobiographical account of his 2018 campaign.

=== U.S. House of Representatives campaign ===
In July 2019, Hattersley announced that he would not seek reelection in the Florida State Legislature, and would instead challenge Congressman Ross Spano in Florida's 15th congressional district. Earning 33 percent of the vote, Hattersley placed second in the primary election out of three total candidates, with Alan Cohn advancing to the general election.

=== Chief Financial Officer of Florida campaign ===
Hattersley ran for Chief Financial Officer of Florida in 2022. He campaigned on addressing the property insurance crisis, holding elected officials accountable, and making the CFO's role less political. Hattersley lost the election to incumbent Republican Jimmy Patronis.

== Political positions ==
Hattersley supports a public health insurance option to lower health insurance costs. He calls for action to address global warming. He has proposals for improving educational opportunities for veterans.

Party political offices
Preceded by Jeremy Ring	Democratic nominee for Chief Financial Officer of Florida; 2022	Succeeded by Annette Taddeo
