= West and East Lealman, Florida =

- Former CDP
- Location in Pinellas County and the state of Florida
- Coordinates: 27°49′12″N 82°41′12″W
- Country: United States
- State: Florida
- County: Pinellas

Area
  - Total: 4.7 sq mi (12.3 km^{2})
  - Land: 4.7 sq mi (12.2 km^{2})
  - Water: 0.039 sq mi (0.1 km^{2})
- Elevation: 49 ft (15 m)

Population (2000)
  - Total: 21,753
  - Density: 4,580/sq mi (1,768.5/km^{2})
- Time zone: UTC-5 (Eastern (EST))
  - Summer (DST): UTC-4 (EDT)
- ZIP Code: 33714
- Area code: 727
- FIPS code: 12-75912
- GNIS feature ID: 1853302

West and East Lealman, more commonly known collectively as Lealman, was a census-designated place (CDP) in Pinellas County, Florida, United States. The population was 21,753 at the 2000 census. For the 2010 census, the area was split into two separate CDPs, Lealman and West Lealman.

== Geography ==
"West and East Lealman" was located at 27°49′12″N 82°41′12″W (27.820103, -82.686670). The community is adjacent to the cities of Pinellas Park, St. Petersburg, and Kenneth City. The elevation is 49 feet (15 m) above sea level.

According to the United States Census Bureau, the CDP had a total area of 12.3 km^{2} (4.7 sq mi). 12.3 km^{2} (4.7 sq mi) of it was land and 0.1 km^{2} (0.039 sq mi) of it (0.63%) was water.

== Demographics ==
Historical population
Census	Pop.	Note	%±
1980	19,873		—
1990	21,748		9.4%
2000	21,753		0.0%

As of the census of 2000, there were 21,753 people, 9,906 households, and 5,369 families residing in the CDP. The population density was 1,775.7 people/km^{2} (4,599 people/mi^{2}). There were 11,750 housing units at an average density of 959.1 units/km^{2} (2,484 units/mi^{2}). The racial makeup of the CDP was 88.31% White, 3.22% African American, 0.61% Native American, 4.08% Asian, 0.07% Pacific Islander, 1.65% from other races, and 2.05% from two or more races. Hispanic or Latino of any race were 4.91% of the population.

There were 9,906 households, out of which 23.5% had children under the age of 18 living with them, 36.4% were married couples living together, 12.7% had a female householder with no husband present, and 45.8% were non-families. 37.0% of all households were made up of individuals, and 16.3% had someone living alone who was 65 years of age or older. The average household size was 2.16 and the average family size was 2.82.

In the CDP, the population was spread out, with 21.0% under the age of 18, 6.7% from 18 to 24, 28.9% from 25 to 44, 23.9% from 45 to 64, and 19.3% who were 65 years of age or older. The median age was 41 years. For every 100 females, there were 99.1 males. For every 100 females age 18 and over, there were 97.4 males.

The median income for a household in the CDP was $26,282, and the median income for a family was $31,915. Males had a median income of $25,700 versus $20,639 for females. The per capita income for the CDP was $15,672. About 11.5% of families and 17.4% of the population were below the poverty line, including 22.1% of those under age 18 and 12.7% of those age 65 or over.
