= Fairview Shores, Florida =

Unincorporated area in Florida, US

- Census-designated place
- Location in Orange County and the state of Florida
- Coordinates: 28°35′48″N 81°22′52″W
- Country: United States
- State: Florida
- County: Orange

Area
  - Total: 3.32 sq mi (8.60 km^{2})
  - Land: 2.96 sq mi (7.67 km^{2})
  - Water: 0.36 sq mi (0.93 km^{2})
- Elevation: 98 ft (30 m)

Population (2020)
  - Total: 10,722
  - Density: 3,622.7/sq mi (1,398.74/km^{2})
- Time zone: UTC-5 (Eastern (EST))
  - Summer (DST): UTC-4 (EDT)
- FIPS code: 12-21750
- GNIS feature ID: 2402474

Fairview Shores is a census-designated place and an unincorporated area in Orange County, Florida, United States. As of the 2020 census, Fairview Shores had a population of 10,722. It is part of the Orlando–Kissimmee–Sanford, Florida Metropolitan Statistical Area.

== Geography ==
According to the United States Census Bureau, the CDP has a total area of 3.6 square miles (9.3 km^{2}), of which 3.1 square miles (7.9 km^{2}) is land and 0.54 square miles (1.4 km^{2}) (15.18%) is water.

== Demographics ==
Historical population
Census	Pop.	Note	%±
2020	10,722		—
U.S. Decennial Census

=== 2020 census ===
As of the 2020 census, Fairview Shores had a population of 10,722. The median age was 39.2 years. 19.0% of residents were under the age of 18 and 16.5% of residents were 65 years of age or older. For every 100 females there were 101.0 males, and for every 100 females age 18 and over there were 99.7 males age 18 and over.

100.0% of residents lived in urban areas, while 0.0% lived in rural areas.

There were 4,608 households in Fairview Shores, of which 24.3% had children under the age of 18 living in them. Of all households, 30.9% were married-couple households, 24.8% were households with a male householder and no spouse or partner present, and 33.8% were households with a female householder and no spouse or partner present. About 34.4% of all households were made up of individuals and 12.3% had someone living alone who was 65 years of age or older.

There were 4,985 housing units, of which 7.6% were vacant. The homeowner vacancy rate was 2.5% and the rental vacancy rate was 7.7%.

Racial composition as of the 2020 census
Race	Number	Percent
White	6,099	56.9%
Black or African American	1,989	18.6%
American Indian and Alaska Native	50	0.5%
Asian	452	4.2%
Native Hawaiian and Other Pacific Islander	9	0.1%
Some other race	722	6.7%
Two or more races	1,401	13.1%
Hispanic or Latino (of any race)	2,173	20.3%

=== 2000 census ===
At the 2000 census there were 13,898 people, 5,879 households, and 3,333 families in the CDP. The population density was 1,372.4/km^{2} (3,550.8/mi^{2}). There were 6,326 housing units at an average density of 624.7/km^{2} (1,616.3/mi^{2}). The racial makeup of the CDP was 78.09% White, 13.28% African American, 0.36% Native American, 2.72% Asian, 0.11% Pacific Islander, 3.14% from other races, and 2.30% from two or more races. Hispanic or Latino of any race were 9.43%.

Of the 5,879 households 26.7% had children under the age of 18 living with them, 37.1% were married couples living together, 14.6% had a female householder with no husband present, and 43.3% were non-families. 31.6% of households were one person and 11.2% were one person aged 65 or older. The average household size was 2.33 and the average family size was 2.97.

The age distribution was 23.1% under the age of 18, 7.8% from 18 to 24, 34.3% from 25 to 44, 20.8% from 45 to 64, and 14.0% 65 or older. The median age was 36 years. For every 100 females, there were 97.1 males. For every 100 females age 18 and over, there were 93.4 males.

The median household income was $35,399 and the median family income was $41,570. Males had a median income of $31,203 versus $26,221 for females. The per capita income for the CDP was $19,918. About 9.4% of families and 13.6% of the population were below the poverty line, including 20.0% of those under age 18 and 9.5% of those age 65 or over.
