= Ross Spano =

American politician (born 1966)

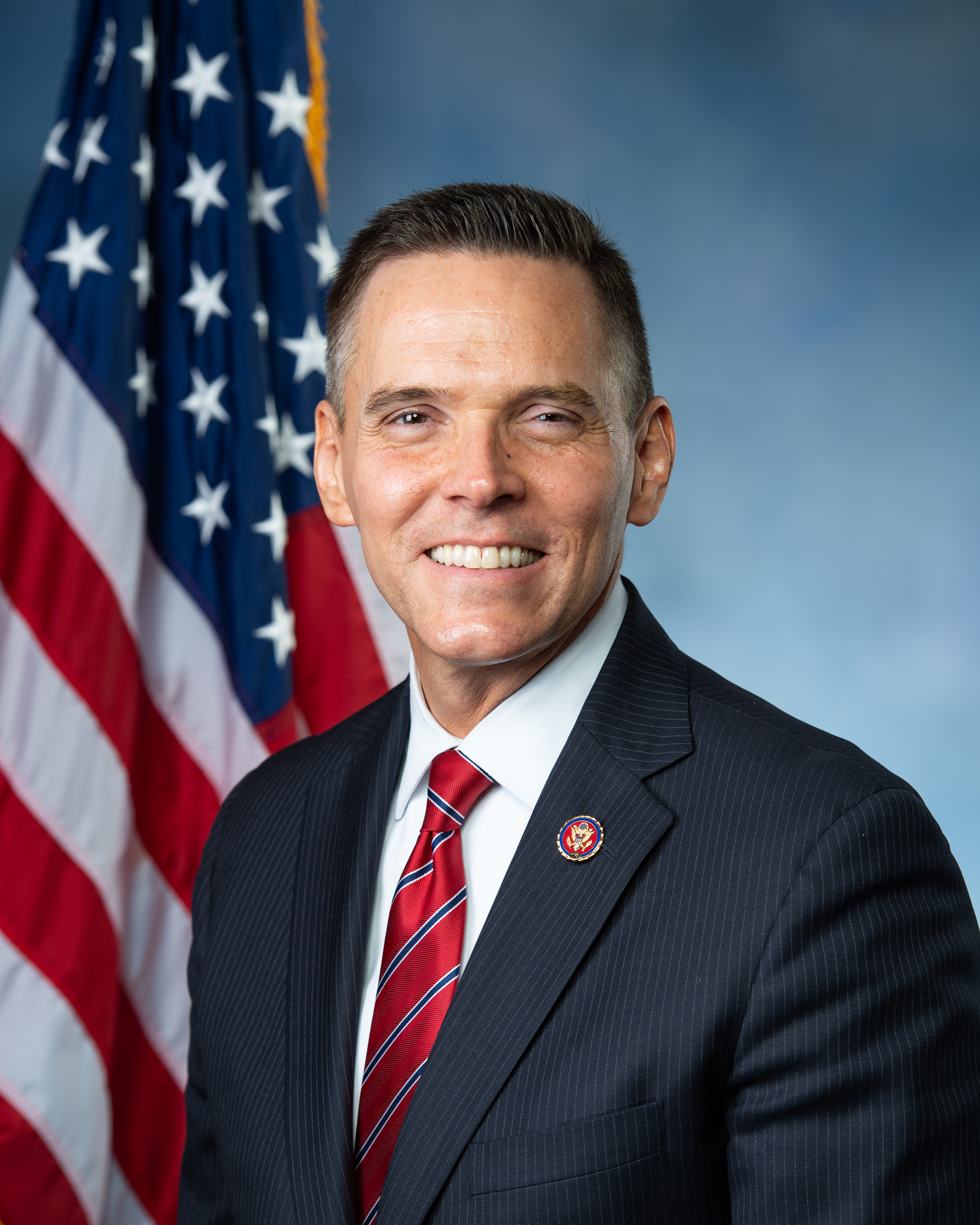
- Official portrait, 2019

Member of the U.S. House of Representatives from Florida's 15th district
- In office January 3, 2019 – January 3, 2021
- Preceded by: Dennis Ross
- Succeeded by: Scott Franklin

Member of the Florida House of Representatives from the 59th district
- In office November 6, 2012 – November 6, 2018
- Preceded by: Redistricted
- Succeeded by: Adam Hattersley

Personal details
- Born: Vincent Ross Spano; July 16, 1966 (age 60) Tampa, Florida, U.S.
- Party: Republican
- Spouse: Amie
- Children: 4
- Education: University of South Florida (BA); Florida State University (JD)

Vincent Ross Spano (born July 16, 1966) is an American politician who served as the U.S. representative from Florida's 15th congressional district. The district stretches from Lakeland to the northeastern suburbs of Tampa. A Republican, he was first elected to Congress in the 2018 elections. He ran for reelection in the 2020 election but was defeated in the Republican primary.

== Personal life ==
Ross Spano was born in Tampa and currently lives in nearby Dover. He graduated from Brandon High School. He later attended the University of South Florida, where he graduated with a BA in history in 1994, and the Florida State University College of Law, receiving a JD cum laude in 1998, where he was a member of the FSU moot court team and the FSU Journal of Transnational Law and Policy. Ross Spano was admitted to the Florida bar the same year.

Spano is a Baptist.

== Florida House of Representatives ==
In 2012, following the reconfiguration of the Florida House of Representatives districts, Spano ran in the newly created 59th District, and faced Joe Wicker, Betty Jo Tompkins, and Mike Floyd in the Republican primary. He emerged victorious with 40% of the vote, with Wicker close behind having 38% of the vote. Spano ran in the general election against the Democratic nominee, Gail Gottlieb. Spano defeated Gottlieb with 51% of the vote, coming out ahead by 1,051 votes.

In the Florida House of Representatives, Spano serves on the Choice and Innovation Subcommittee, Civil Justice Subcommittee, Health Quality Subcommittee, Higher Education & Workforce Subcommittee, and Judiciary Committee. Ross Spano also served on the Federal Judicial Nominating Commission during his tenure in the Florida House.

While serving in the legislature Spano authored numerous pieces of human trafficking legislation. He sponsored a bill to allow judges "to vacate certain criminal convictions if the offender can prove that they committed them under duress," as would happen in a situation in which someone had been illegally trafficked.

In 2017, Spano sponsored a resolution declaring that the viewing of pornography was causing a "public health crisis."

== U.S. House of Representatives ==
=== Elections ===
==== 2018 ====
In 2018, Spano ran to represent Florida's 15th congressional district in the United States House of Representatives. He defeated Neil Combee in the Republican primary, winning approximately 44% of the votes to Combee's 34%. Spano went on to face Democratic candidate Kristen Carlson in the general election. Spano defeated Carlson, receiving 53% of the vote to Carlson's 47%. It was the closest race in the district in 26 years, when Charles Canady only won by five points in 1992 in what was then the 12th District. Additionally, it was only the fourth time that a Democrat had managed 40 percent of the vote in the district since Andy Ireland switched parties in 1984 in what was then the 10th District (it was renumbered the 12th in 1992, and has been the 15th since 2013).

During Spano's election to the House of Representatives in 2018, he loaned his campaign more than $100,000 from what he reported as personal funds - a move that drew media attention as financial disclosures forms filed by Spano indicated that he did not have the necessary funds to loan himself the reported amount. It was later reported that Spano had been lent the money by friends. In December 2018, Spano wrote in a news release that his campaign financing "may have been in violation of the Federal Campaign Finance Act". In November 2019, it was reported that the Justice Department was conducting a criminal investigation into Spano over possible campaign finance violations. Spano has denied any wrongdoing.

==== 2020 ====
In August 2020, Spano narrowly lost the primary for renomination by the Republican Party to Scott Franklin.

=== Tenure ===
Spano gained attention when he quoted civil rights leader Coretta Scott King to explain his opposition to the Equality Act, which would outlaw discrimination on the basis of sexual orientation and gender identity; King was a leading supporter of LGBT rights.

On December 18, 2019, Spano voted against both articles of impeachment against Trump.

In December 2020, Spano was one of 126 Republican members of the House of Representatives who signed an amicus brief in support of Texas v. Pennsylvania, a lawsuit filed at the United States Supreme Court contesting the results of the 2020 presidential election, in which Joe Biden prevailed over incumbent Donald Trump. The Supreme Court declined to hear the case on the basis that Texas lacked standing under Article III of the Constitution to challenge the results of the election held by another state.

=== Committee assignments ===
- United States House Committee on Transportation and Infrastructure
  - Subcommittee on Aviation
  - Subcommittee on Highways and Transit
  - Subcommittee on Railways, Pipelines, and Hazardous Materials
- United States House Committee on Small Business
  - Subcommittee on Economic Growth, Tax and Capital Access
  - Subcommittee on Investigations, Oversight and Regulations (Ranking Member)

== Electoral history ==
2018, Florida's 15th congressional district, Republican primary results
Party	Candidate	Votes	%
Republican	Ross Spano	26,868	44.1
Republican	Neil Combee	20,577	33.8
Republican	Sean Harper	6,013	9.9
Republican	Danny Kushmer	4,061	6.7
Republican	Ed Shoemaker	3,377	5.5
Total votes		60,896	100.0

Florida's 15th congressional district, 2018
Party	Candidate	Votes	%
Republican	Ross Spano	151,380	53.0
Democratic	Kristen Carlson	134,132	47.0
Independent	Dave Johnson (write-in)	15	0.0
Independent	Jeffrey G. Rabinowitz (write-in)	3	0.0
Independent	Alek Bynzar (write-in)	2	0.0
Total votes		285,532	100.0
Republican hold			

=== Primary results ===
2020, Florida's 15th congressional district, Republican primary results
Party	Candidate	Votes	%
Republican	Scott Franklin	30,718	51.2
Republican	Ross Spano (incumbent)	29,240	48.8
Total votes		59,958	100.0

U.S. House of Representatives
Preceded by Dennis Ross	Member of the U.S. House of Representatives from Florida's 15th congressional district 2019–2021	Succeeded by Scott Franklin
U.S. order of precedence (ceremonial)
Preceded by Debbie Mucarsel-Powell as Former U.S. Representative	Order of precedence of the United States as Former U.S. Representative	Succeeded by Chris Bell as Former U.S. Representative
