= Whisper Walk, Florida =

- unincorporated place
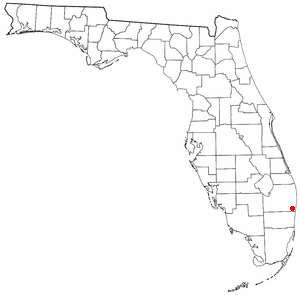
- Location of Whisper Walk, Florida
- Coordinates: 26°23′51″N 80°11′15″W
- Country: United States
- State: Florida
- County: Palm Beach

Area
  - Total: 1.0 sq mi (2.6 km^{2})
  - Land: 1.0 sq mi (2.6 km^{2})
  - Water: 0 sq mi (0.0 km^{2})
- Elevation: 20 ft (6.1 m)

Population (2000)
  - Total: 5,135
  - Density: 5,124/sq mi (1,978.3/km^{2})
- Time zone: UTC-5 (Eastern (EST))
  - Summer (DST): UTC-4 (EDT)
- Area codes: 561, 728
- FIPS code: 12-77216
- GNIS feature ID: 2403020

Whisper Walk was a former census-designated place (CDP) and current unincorporated place northwest of Boca Raton in Palm Beach County, Florida, United States. The population was 5,135 at the 2000 census. While it is not in the city of Boca Raton, Boca Raton is its postal address, and the community is frequently classified under its umbrella term.

== Geography ==
According to the United States Census Bureau, the CDP has a total area of 2.6 km^{2} (1.0 sq mi), all land.

== Demographics ==
Whisper Walk is a 55 and over community. By deed restriction, at least one member of the household must be age fifty-five or higher. The majority of residents are seasonal, retired Jewish couples from the New York metropolitan area, and other Northeastern areas.

As of the census of 2000, there were 5,135 people, 2,418 households, and 1,716 families residing in the CDP. The population density was 1,982.6 people/km^{2} (5,135 people/mi^{2}). There were 2,637 housing units at an average density of 1,018.2 units/km^{2} (2,637 units/mi^{2}). The racial makeup of the CDP was 93.67% White (89% were Non-Hispanic White,) 2.06% African American, 0.04% Native American, 2.77% Asian, 0.53% from other races, and 0.93% from two or more races. Hispanic or Latino of any race were 5.63% of the population.

In 2000, there were 2,418 households, out of which 16.6% had children under the age of 18 living with them, 65.3% were married couples living together, 3.7% had a female householder with no husband present, and 29.0% were non-families. 26.7% of all households were made up of individuals, and 22.4% had someone living alone who was 65 years of age or older. The average household size was 2.12 and the average family size was 2.53.

In 2000, in the former CDP, the population was spread out, with 14.9% under the age of 18, 2.3% from 18 to 24, 16.4% from 25 to 44, 15.0% from 45 to 64, and 51.4% who were 65 years of age or older. The median age was 66 years. For every 100 females, there were 84.6 males. For every 100 females age 18 and over, there were 82.0 males.

In 2000, the median income for a household in the CDP was $42,368, and the median income for a family was $51,308. Males had a median income of $51,422 versus $34,844 for females. The per capita income for the CDP was $26,098. About 3.4% of families and 4.7% of the population were below the poverty line, including 5.7% of those under age 18 and 5.3% of those age 65 or over.

As of 2000, English was the first language for 91.60% of all residents, while Spanish accounted for 5.48%, Italian for 1.18%, Yiddish made up 1.07%, and Hebrew was the mother tongue for 0.64% of the population.
