= The Herald-Standard =

Daily newspaper in Uniontown, Pennsylvania

- Type: Daily newspaper
- Owner: Ogden Newspapers
- Founded: 1797
- Language: English
- Headquarters: Uniontown, Pennsylvania
- OCLC number: 15355917
- Website: heraldstandard.com

The Herald-Standard is a daily newspaper in Uniontown, Pennsylvania, and it has a circulation of 30,000. The newspaper and the newspaper's website, Heraldstandard.com - Uniontown Newspapers, Inc., are owned by Ogden Newspapers.

== History ==
The Herald-Standard newspaper traces its ancestry back to the Fayette Gazette and Union Advertiser which published its first edition on December 5, 1797. The media company was purchased in part by Stanley W. Calkins in the 1930s. Calkins Media Inc. owned five daily and one weekly newspaper in Pennsylvania, one daily newspaper in New Jersey, one weekly newspaper in Florida, two ABC affiliate television stations in Florida and one station in Alabama. Calkins sold The Herald-Standard to Ogden Newspapers in 2017. The Herald-Standard also owns the weekly Greene County Messenger.

Heraldstandard.com has nearly 185 employees and it currently reaches over 168,000 readers in its local and surrounding markets.
