= Wedgefield, Florida =

Unincorporated area in Florida, US

Wedgefield In Orlando Florida
- Census-designated place
- Location in Orange County and the state of Florida
- Coordinates: 28°29′46″N 81°05′25″W
- Country: United States
- State: Florida
- County: Orange

Area
  - Total: 23.39 sq mi (60.59 km^{2})
  - Land: 23.33 sq mi (60.43 km^{2})
  - Water: 0.066 sq mi (0.17 km^{2})
- Elevation: 69 ft (21 m)

Population (2020)
  - Total: 8,017 ▲
  - Density: 343.6/sq mi (132.68/km^{2})
- Time zone: UTC-5 (Eastern (EST))
  - Summer (DST): UTC-4 (EDT)
- FIPS code: 12-75612
- GNIS feature ID: 2402990

Wedgefield is a census-designated place and an unincorporated area in Orange County, Florida, United States. As of the 2020 census, Wedgefield had a population of 8,017. It is part of the Orlando–Kissimmee Metropolitan Statistical Area.

== Geography ==
According to the United States Census Bureau, the CDP has a total area of 60.9 km^{2} (23.5 mi^{2}), of which 60.7 km^{2} (23.4 mi^{2}) is land and 0.2 km^{2} (0.1 mi^{2}) (0.34%) is water.

Wedgefield is bounded by SR 520 and SR 528 (Beachline Expressway), in a corner such that the two roads make a wedge shape where they meet. The other major road is Dallas Boulevard, formerly SR 13, which used to link to East Colonial Drive but has not for decades since a portion north of Wedgefield was demolished and sodded over. Dallas Boulevard only links directly to the Beachline (Exit 24), where only eastbound traffic can exit onto Dallas and traffic on Dallas can only enter the Beachline westbound. Traffic seeking to get onto the Beachline eastbound, SR 520 or SR 50 must take a series of side roads onto SR 520.

Most of the land in Wedgefield is divided into lots of 1-acre (4,000 m^{2}) or larger, but the majority of houses in the subdivision are situated on lots of one acre or less.

== Demographics ==
Historical population
Census	Pop.	Note	%±
2000	2,700		—
2010	6,705		148.3%
2020	8,017		19.6%
U.S. Decennial Census

=== 2020 census ===
As of the 2020 census, Wedgefield had a population of 8,017. The median age was 43.3 years. 20.8% of residents were under the age of 18 and 15.9% of residents were 65 years of age or older. For every 100 females there were 98.2 males, and for every 100 females age 18 and over there were 96.6 males age 18 and over.

0.0% of residents lived in urban areas, while 100.0% lived in rural areas.

There were 2,782 households in Wedgefield, of which 33.9% had children under the age of 18 living in them. Of all households, 65.6% were married-couple households, 12.4% were households with a male householder and no spouse or partner present, and 16.4% were households with a female householder and no spouse or partner present. About 15.2% of all households were made up of individuals and 5.1% had someone living alone who was 65 years of age or older.

There were 2,860 housing units, of which 2.7% were vacant. The homeowner vacancy rate was 0.6% and the rental vacancy rate was 4.7%.

Racial composition as of the 2020 census
Race	Number	Percent
White	4,671	58.3%
Black or African American	817	10.2%
American Indian and Alaska Native	34	0.4%
Asian	418	5.2%
Native Hawaiian and Other Pacific Islander	10	0.1%
Some other race	715	8.9%
Two or more races	1,352	16.9%
Hispanic or Latino (of any race)	2,259	28.2%

=== 2000 census ===
As of the census of 2000, there were 2,700 people, 956 households, and 790 families residing in the CDP. The population density was 44.5/km^{2} (115.3/mi^{2}). There were 1,010 housing units at an average density of 16.7/km^{2} (43.1/mi^{2}). The racial makeup of the CDP was 81.15% White, 6.78% African American, 0.07% Native American, 7.56% Asian, 0.22% Pacific Islander, 2.81% from other races, and 1.41% from two or more races. Hispanic or Latino of any race were 9.15% of the population.

There were 956 households, out of which 35.6% had children under the age of 18 living with them, 72.5% were married couples living together, 6.7% had a female householder with no husband present, and 17.3% were non-families. 11.0% of all households were made up of individuals, and 2.9% had someone living alone who was 65 years of age or older. The average household size was 2.82 and the average family size was 3.05.

In the CDP, the population was spread out, with 24.6% under the age of 18, 6.5% from 18 to 24, 32.5% from 25 to 44, 26.4% from 45 to 64, and 10.0% who were 65 years of age or older. The median age was 38 years. For every 100 females, there were 104.9 males. For every 100 females age 18 and over, there were 101.3 males.

The median income for a household in the CDP was $61,705, and the median income for a family was $62,174. Males had a median income of $34,792 versus $28,653 for females. The per capita income for the CDP was $24,448. About 6.3% of families and 5.8% of the population were below the poverty line, including 9.9% of those under age 18 and none of those age 65 or over.
