= West Lealman, Florida =

- Census-designated place
- Location within Florida
- Coordinates: 27°49′15″N 82°44′47″W
- Country: United States
- State: Florida
- County: Pinellas

Area
  - Total: 3.27 sq mi (8.47 km^{2})
  - Land: 3.15 sq mi (8.15 km^{2})
  - Water: 0.12 sq mi (0.32 km^{2})
- Elevation: 13 ft (4.0 m)

Population (2020)
  - Total: 16,438
  - Density: 5,224.6/sq mi (2,017.24/km^{2})
- Time zone: UTC-5 (Eastern (EST))
  - Summer (DST): UTC-4 (EDT)
- Area code: 727
- FIPS code: 12-76481
- GNIS feature ID: 2583388

West Lealman is a census-designated place (CDP) in Pinellas County, Florida, United States. As of the 2020 census, West Lealman had a population of 16,438. Prior to 2010, West Lealman was part of a larger CDP named West and East Lealman.

== Geography ==
West Lealman is bordered by the city of Pinellas Park to the northeast, St. Petersburg to the south, and by the town of Kenneth City to the east. Long Bayou and Cross Bayou border the CDP to the west, with the city of Seminole on the opposite shore of Cross Bayou.

According to the United States Census Bureau, the CDP has a total area of 3.2 square miles (8.3 km^{2}), of which 3.1 square miles (8.1 km^{2}) is land and 0.08 square miles (0.2 km^{2}) (1.96%) is water.

== Demographics ==
Historical population
Census	Pop.	Note	%±
2020	16,438		—
U.S. Decennial Census

West Lealman first appeared as a census designated place in the 2010 U.S. census formed from part of the deleted West and East Lealman, Florida CDP.

=== 2020 census ===
As of the 2020 census, West Lealman had a population of 16,438. The median age was 52.8 years. 16.0% of residents were under the age of 18 and 29.8% of residents were 65 years of age or older. For every 100 females there were 91.8 males, and for every 100 females age 18 and over there were 90.0 males age 18 and over.

100.0% of residents lived in urban areas, while 0.0% lived in rural areas.

There were 7,974 households in West Lealman, of which 17.7% had children under the age of 18 living in them. Of all households, 31.9% were married-couple households, 24.4% were households with a male householder and no spouse or partner present, and 35.0% were households with a female householder and no spouse or partner present. About 42.6% of all households were made up of individuals and 24.6% had someone living alone who was 65 years of age or older.

There were 9,561 housing units, of which 16.6% were vacant. The homeowner vacancy rate was 1.6% and the rental vacancy rate was 4.6%.

Racial composition as of the 2020 census
Race	Number	Percent
White	12,407	75.5%
Black or African American	1,008	6.1%
American Indian and Alaska Native	63	0.4%
Asian	853	5.2%
Native Hawaiian and Other Pacific Islander	13	0.1%
Some other race	627	3.8%
Two or more races	1,467	8.9%
Hispanic or Latino (of any race)	1,968	12.0%
