= Zephyrhills South, Florida =

- CDP
- Location in Pasco County and the state of Florida
- Coordinates: 28°12′55″N 82°11′19″W
- Country: United States
- State: Florida
- County: Pasco

Area
  - Total: 1.98 sq mi (5.12 km^{2})
  - Land: 1.98 sq mi (5.12 km^{2})
  - Water: 0 sq mi (0.00 km^{2})
- Elevation: 79 ft (24 m)

Population (2020)
  - Total: 4,985
  - Density: 2,521.8/sq mi (973.66/km^{2})
- Time zone: UTC-5 (Eastern (EST))
  - Summer (DST): UTC-4 (EDT)
- FIPS code: 12-79237
- GNIS feature ID: 2403051

Zephyrhills South is a census-designated place (CDP) in Pasco County, Florida, United States. As of the 2020 census, Zephyrhills South had a population of 4,985.

== Geography ==
According to the United States Census Bureau, the CDP has a total area of 1.9 square miles (5.0 km^{2}), all land.

=== Climate ===
Climate data for Zephyrhills
Month	Jan	Feb	Mar	Apr	May	Jun	Jul	Aug	Sep	Oct	Nov	Dec	Year
Mean daily maximum °F (°C)	71 (22)	73 (23)	77 (25)	82 (28)	87 (31)	90 (32)	90 (32)	91 (33)	88 (31)	83 (28)	76 (24)	72 (22)	82 (28)
Mean daily minimum °F (°C)	52 (11)	53 (12)	56 (13)	62 (17)	67 (19)	71 (22)	73 (23)	73 (23)	72 (22)	66 (19)	58 (14)	53 (12)	63 (17)
Average precipitation inches (mm)	2.2 (56)	2.3 (58)	4.5 (110)	3.3 (84)	3.2 (81)	6.7 (170)	8.7 (220)	6.9 (180)	6.5 (170)	3.3 (84)	1.7 (43)	2.1 (53)	51.4 (1,310)
Source: Weatherbase

== Demographics ==
Historical population
Census	Pop.	Note	%±
1980	1,986		—
1990	2,514		26.6%
2000	4,435		76.4%
2010	5,276		19.0%
2020	4,985		−5.5%

=== 2020 census ===
As of the 2020 census, Zephyrhills South had a population of 4,985. The median age was 60.0 years. 11.9% of residents were under the age of 18 and 42.2% of residents were 65 years of age or older. For every 100 females there were 91.1 males, and for every 100 females age 18 and over there were 91.1 males age 18 and over.

100.0% of residents lived in urban areas, while 0.0% lived in rural areas.

There were 2,529 households in Zephyrhills South, of which 14.9% had children under the age of 18 living in them. Of all households, 40.3% were married-couple households, 21.4% were households with a male householder and no spouse or partner present, and 30.1% were households with a female householder and no spouse or partner present. About 37.8% of all households were made up of individuals and 25.1% had someone living alone who was 65 years of age or older.

There were 4,022 housing units, of which 37.1% were vacant. The homeowner vacancy rate was 2.6% and the rental vacancy rate was 11.3%.

Racial composition as of the 2020 census
Race	Number	Percent
White	4,259	85.4%
Black or African American	103	2.1%
American Indian and Alaska Native	41	0.8%
Asian	36	0.7%
Native Hawaiian and Other Pacific Islander	1	0.0%
Some other race	179	3.6%
Two or more races	366	7.3%
Hispanic or Latino (of any race)	565	11.3%

=== 2000 census ===
At the 2000 census, there were 4,435 people, 2,199 households and 1,451 families residing in the CDP. The population density was 2,311.9 inhabitants per square mile (892.6/km^{2}). There were 3,651 housing units at an average density of 1,903.2 per square mile (734.8/km^{2}). The racial makeup was 96.05% White, 0.74% African American, 0.36% Native American, 0.36% Asian, 0.02% Pacific Islander, 0.59% from other races, and 1.87% from two or more races. Hispanic or Latino of any race were 2.64% of the population.

There were 2,199 households, of which 11.1% had children under the age of 18 living with them, 58.3% were married couples living together, 5.9% had a female householder with no husband present, and 34.0% were non-families. 28.4% of all households were made up of individuals, and 19.0% had someone living alone who was 65 years of age or older. The average household size was 2.02 and the average family size was 2.39.

11.7% of the population were under the age of 18, 3.9% from 18 to 24, 15.1% from 25 to 44, 22.3% from 45 to 64, and 47.0% who were 65 years of age or older. The median age was 63 years. For every 100 females, there were 93.4 males. For every 100 females age 18 and over, there were 92.2 males.

The median household income was $23,483 and the median family income was $29,681. Males had a median income of $26,771 and females $20,395 for. The per capita income was $14,905. About 8.1% of families and 12.5% of the population were below the poverty line, including 24.9% of those under age 18 and 7.2% of those age 65 or over.
