= Willow Oak, Florida =

- Census-designated place
- Location in Polk County and the state of Florida
- Coordinates: 27°55′18″N 82°01′28″W
- Country: United States
- State: Florida
- County: Polk

Area
  - Total: 3.14 sq mi (8.14 km^{2})
  - Land: 3.12 sq mi (8.08 km^{2})
  - Water: 0.027 sq mi (0.07 km^{2})
- Elevation: 108 ft (33 m)

Population (2020)
  - Total: 6,806
  - Density: 2,182.0/sq mi (842.46/km^{2})
- Time zone: UTC-5 (Eastern (EST))
  - Summer (DST): UTC-4 (EDT)
- Area code: 863
- FIPS code: 12-77862
- GNIS feature ID: 2403032

Willow Oak is a census-designated place (CDP) in western Polk County, Florida, United States. As of the 2020 census, Willow Oak had a population of 6,806. It is part of the Lakeland–Winter Haven Metropolitan Statistical Area.

== Geography ==
According to the United States Census Bureau, the CDP has a total area of 3.2 square miles (8.3 km^{2}), all land.

== Demographics ==
Historical population
Census	Pop.	Note	%±
2020	6,806		—
U.S. Decennial Census

=== 2020 census ===
As of the 2020 census, Willow Oak had a population of 6,806. The median age was 31.8 years. 29.7% of residents were under the age of 18 and 10.2% of residents were 65 years of age or older. For every 100 females there were 104.0 males, and for every 100 females age 18 and over there were 101.3 males age 18 and over.

100.0% of residents lived in urban areas, while 0.0% lived in rural areas.

There were 2,214 households in Willow Oak, of which 41.1% had children under the age of 18 living in them. Of all households, 48.6% were married-couple households, 18.2% were households with a male householder and no spouse or partner present, and 22.8% were households with a female householder and no spouse or partner present. About 19.7% of all households were made up of individuals and 7.2% had someone living alone who was 65 years of age or older.

There were 2,385 housing units, of which 7.2% were vacant. The homeowner vacancy rate was 2.6% and the rental vacancy rate was 6.3%.

Racial composition as of the 2020 census
Race	Number	Percent
White	3,895	57.2%
Black or African American	466	6.8%
American Indian and Alaska Native	85	1.2%
Asian	42	0.6%
Native Hawaiian and Other Pacific Islander	3	0.0%
Some other race	989	14.5%
Two or more races	1,326	19.5%
Hispanic or Latino (of any race)	2,861	42.0%

=== 2000 census ===
As of the census of 2000, there were 4,917 people, 1,784 households, and 1,250 families residing in the CDP. The population density was 1,529.1 inhabitants per square mile (590.4/km^{2}). There were 1,932 housing units at an average density of 600.8 units per square mile (232.0 units/km^{2}). The racial makeup of the CDP was 83.67% White, 7.02% African American, 0.45% Native American, 0.49% Asian, 0.02% Pacific Islander, 6.45% from other races, and 1.91% from two or more races. Hispanic or Latino of any race were 19.95% of the population.

There were 1,784 households, out of which 38.3% had children under the age of 18 living with them, 54.0% were married couples living together, 9.8% had a female householder with no husband present, and 29.9% were non-families. 23.8% of all households were made up of individuals, and 4.5% had someone living alone who was 65 years of age or older. The average household size was 2.76 and the average family size was 3.22.

In the CDP, the population was spread out, with 28.9% under the age of 18, 11.1% from 18 to 24, 34.6% from 25 to 44, 18.7% from 45 to 64, and 6.8% who were 65 years of age or older. The median age was 30 years. For every 100 females, there were 106.3 males. For every 100 females age 18 and over, there were 107.9 males.

The median income for a household in the CDP was $39,591, and the median income for a family was $45,545. Males had a median income of $31,819 versus $22,425 for females. The per capita income for the CDP was $16,729. About 7.2% of families and 13.4% of the population were below the poverty line, including 17.0% of those under age 18 and 8.4% of those age 65 or over.
