= Zephyrhills West, Florida =

- CDP
- Location in Pasco County and the state of Florida
- Coordinates: 28°14′32″N 82°11′46″W
- Country: United States
- State: Florida
- County: Pasco

Area
  - Total: 2.63 sq mi (6.81 km^{2})
  - Land: 2.63 sq mi (6.81 km^{2})
  - Water: 0 sq mi (0.00 km^{2})
- Elevation: 85 ft (26 m)

Population (2020)
  - Total: 5,533
  - Density: 2,103.4/sq mi (812.11/km^{2})
- Time zone: UTC-5 (Eastern (EST))
  - Summer (DST): UTC-4 (EDT)
- FIPS code: 12-79243
- GNIS feature ID: 2403052

Zephyrhills West is a census-designated place (CDP) in Pasco County, Florida, United States. As of the 2020 census, Zephyrhills West had a population of 5,533.

== Geography ==
According to the United States Census Bureau, the CDP has a total area of 2.7 square miles (7.0 km^{2}), all land.

== Demographics ==
Historical population
Census	Pop.	Note	%±
1980	3,698		—
1990	4,249		14.9%
2000	5,242		23.4%
2020	5,533		—

=== 2020 census ===
As of the 2020 census, Zephyrhills West had a population of 5,533. The median age was 66.2 years. 8.6% of residents were under the age of 18 and 52.6% of residents were 65 years of age or older. For every 100 females there were 88.8 males, and for every 100 females age 18 and over there were 89.2 males age 18 and over.

100.0% of residents lived in urban areas, while 0.0% lived in rural areas.

There were 2,968 households in Zephyrhills West, of which 10.3% had children under the age of 18 living in them. Of all households, 43.3% were married-couple households, 19.7% were households with a male householder and no spouse or partner present, and 30.1% were households with a female householder and no spouse or partner present. About 36.9% of all households were made up of individuals and 25.4% had someone living alone who was 65 years of age or older.

There were 4,087 housing units, of which 27.4% were vacant. The homeowner vacancy rate was 3.9% and the rental vacancy rate was 16.1%.

Racial composition as of the 2020 census
Race	Number	Percent
White	4,869	88.0%
Black or African American	104	1.9%
American Indian and Alaska Native	12	0.2%
Asian	29	0.5%
Native Hawaiian and Other Pacific Islander	2	0.0%
Some other race	149	2.7%
Two or more races	368	6.7%
Hispanic or Latino (of any race)	479	8.7%

=== 2000 census ===
As of the 2000 census, there were 5,242 people, 2,803 households, and 1,749 families residing in the CDP. The population density was 1,973.4 inhabitants per square mile (761.9/km^{2}). There were 4,133 housing units at an average density of 1,555.9 per square mile (600.7/km^{2}). The racial makeup of the CDP was 97.60% White, 0.23% African American, 0.34% Native American, 0.50% Asian, 0.02% Pacific Islander, 0.40% from other races, and 0.92% from two or more races. Hispanic or Latino of any race were 2.08% of the population.

There were 2,803 households, out of which 8.3% had children under the age of 18 living with them, 56.4% were married couples living together, 4.4% had a female householder with no husband present, and 37.6% were non-families. 34.0% of all households were made up of individuals, and 25.0% had someone living alone who was 65 years of age or older. The average household size was 1.87 and the average family size was 2.31.

In the CDP, the population was spread out, with 9.0% under the age of 18, 2.2% from 18 to 24, 11.8% from 25 to 44, 20.5% from 45 to 64, and 56.4% who were 65 years of age or older. The median age was 68 years. For every 100 females, there were 86.3 males. For every 100 females age 18 and over, there were 85.5 males.

The median income for a household in the CDP was $26,195, and the median income for a family was $29,451. Males had a median income of $27,663 versus $21,346 for females. The per capita income for the CDP was $19,921. About 8.4% of families and 10.7% of the population were below the poverty line, including 30.5% of those under age 18 and 6.4% of those age 65 or over.
