= Zephyrhills North, Florida =

- CDP
- Location in Pasco County and the state of Florida
- Coordinates: 28°14′56″N 82°09′53″W
- Country: United States
- State: Florida
- County: Pasco

Area
  - Total: 0.99 sq mi (2.57 km^{2})
  - Land: 0.99 sq mi (2.57 km^{2})
  - Water: 0 sq mi (0.00 km^{2})
- Elevation: 105 ft (32 m)

Population (2020)
  - Total: 2,663
  - Density: 2,683.4/sq mi (1,036.06/km^{2})
- Time zone: UTC-5 (Eastern (EST))
  - Summer (DST): UTC-4 (EDT)
- FIPS code: 12-79231
- GNIS feature ID: 2403050

Zephyrhills North is a census-designated place (CDP) in Pasco County, Florida, United States. As of the 2020 census, Zephyrhills North had a population of 2,663.

== Geography ==
According to the United States Census Bureau, the CDP has a total area of 1.1 square miles (2.8 km^{2}), all land.

== Demographics ==
Historical population
Census	Pop.	Note	%±
1980	1,710		—
1990	2,320		35.7%
2000	2,544		9.7%
2020	2,663		—

=== 2020 census ===
As of the 2020 census, Zephyrhills North had a population of 2,663. The median age was 62.6 years. 10.3% of residents were under the age of 18 and 45.3% of residents were 65 years of age or older. For every 100 females there were 94.5 males, and for every 100 females age 18 and over there were 94.4 males age 18 and over.

100.0% of residents lived in urban areas, while 0.0% lived in rural areas.

There were 1,408 households in Zephyrhills North, of which 13.6% had children under the age of 18 living in them. Of all households, 45.0% were married-couple households, 22.4% were households with a male householder and no spouse or partner present, and 26.6% were households with a female householder and no spouse or partner present. About 36.0% of all households were made up of individuals and 24.9% had someone living alone who was 65 years of age or older.

There were 1,940 housing units, of which 27.4% were vacant. The homeowner vacancy rate was 2.3% and the rental vacancy rate was 18.7%.

Racial composition as of the 2020 census
Race	Number	Percent
White	2,282	85.7%
Black or African American	68	2.6%
American Indian and Alaska Native	22	0.8%
Asian	21	0.8%
Native Hawaiian and Other Pacific Islander	2	0.1%
Some other race	91	3.4%
Two or more races	177	6.6%
Hispanic or Latino (of any race)	252	9.5%

=== 2000 census ===
As of the 2000 census, there were 2,544 people, 1,298 households, and 842 families residing in the CDP. The population density was 2,360.0 inhabitants per square mile (911.2/km^{2}). There were 1,889 housing units at an average density of 1,752.4 per square mile (676.6/km^{2}). The racial makeup of the CDP was 94.34% White, 1.14% African American, 0.67% Native American, 1.38% Asian, 0.04% Pacific Islander, 1.06% from other races, and 1.38% from two or more races. Hispanic or Latino of any race were 3.30% of the population.

There were 1,298 households, out of which 13.1% had children under the age of 18 living with them, 54.7% were married couples living together, 8.8% had a female householder with no husband present, and 35.1% were non-families. 31.0% of all households were made up of individuals, and 22.0% had someone living alone who was 65 years of age or older. The average household size was 1.96 and the average family size was 2.37.

In the CDP, the population was spread out, with 12.9% under the age of 18, 4.8% from 18 to 24, 14.6% from 25 to 44, 20.3% from 45 to 64, and 47.4% who were 65 years of age or older. The median age was 64 years. For every 100 females, there were 81.5 males. For every 100 females age 18 and over, there were 79.1 males.

The median income for a household in the CDP was $29,462, and the median income for a family was $32,897. Males had a median income of $28,214 versus $20,529 for females. The per capita income for the CDP was $16,344. About 6.6% of families and 10.7% of the population were below the poverty line, including 24.2% of those under age 18 and 5.3% of those age 65 or over.
