= 2026 St. Petersburg, Florida, mayoral election =

Local election in Florida, US

2026 St. Petersburg mayoral election
- August 18, 2026 (primary election); November 3, 2026 (runoff)
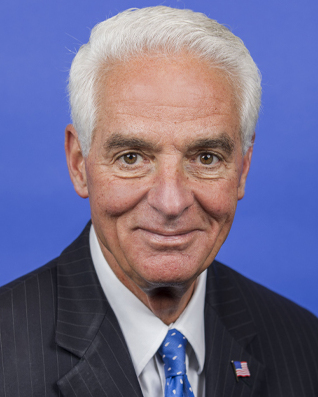

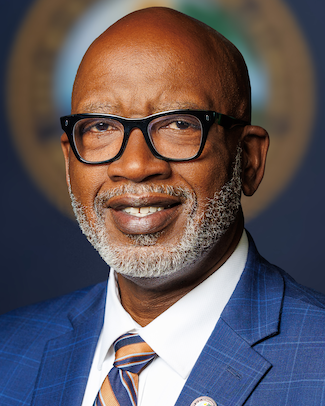

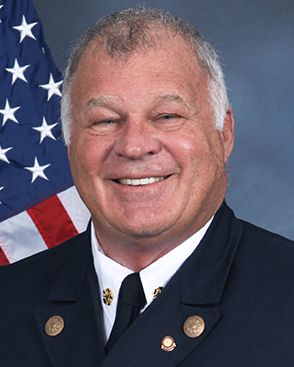

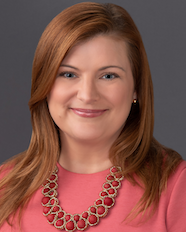
Candidate	Charlie Crist	Ken Welch	Jim Large
Party	Nonpartisan	Nonpartisan	Nonpartisan
Alliance	Democratic	Democratic	Republican
First round	19,436; 35.19%	11,451; 20.73%	9,852; 17.84%
Runoff	64,858; 62.00%	39,758; 38.00%	Eliminated
Candidate	Brandi Gabbard	Maria Scruggs
Party	Nonpartisan	Nonpartisan
Alliance	Democratic
First round	9,737; 17.63%	2,881; 5.22%
Runoff	Eliminated	Eliminated
- First round precinct results Crist: 20–30% 30–40% 40–50% 50–60% 60–70% 70–80% 80–90% Welch: 20–30% 30–40% 40–50% 50–60% 60–70% Large: 40–50% Gabbard: 20–30% 30–40% Tie: 30–40%
Mayor before election
Ken Welch
Democratic
Elected mayor
Charlie Crist
Democratic

The 2026 St. Petersburg mayoral election took place on August 18, 2026, with a runoff election scheduled to be held on November 3, 2026. Incumbent mayor Ken Welch, who was first elected in 2021, is seeking re-election. Welch and his main challenger, former Florida governor Charlie Crist, advanced to the runoff election after no candidate received a majority of the vote. Crist subsequently defeated Welch in the runoff by a 24-point margin.

The election is officially non-partisan, though candidates are free to reveal their registered party affiliations. Crist and Welch are both registered members of the Democratic Party.

== Candidates ==
=== Advanced to runoff ===
- Charlie Crist, former U.S. representative (2017–2022), former Republican governor of Florida (2007–2011), Democratic nominee for governor in 2014 and 2022, and Independent candidate for U.S. Senate in 2010 (Democratic)
- Ken Welch, incumbent mayor (Democratic)

=== Eliminated in first round ===
- Kevin Batdorf, former Shore Acres Neighborhood Association president (endorsed Crist)
- Brandi Gabbard, St. Petersburg city councilor (Democratic)
- Jim Large, former St. Petersburg fire chief (Republican)
- Maria Scruggs, former president of the St. Petersburg NAACP and perennial candidate (endorsed Crist)

=== Not on ballot ===
- Paul Congemi, perennial candidate and candidate for mayor in 2009, 2013, and 2017

=== Declined ===
- Ben Diamond, former state representative from HD-68 (2016–2022) (endorsed Crist)

== First round ==
=== Endorsements ===
Charlie Crist

U.S. representatives

- Cheri Bustos, former IL-17 (2013–2023)
- Matt Cartwright, former PA-08 (2013–2025)
- Lois Frankel, FL-22 (2013–present)

Judicial officials

- James E. C. Perry, former Florida Supreme Court justice (2009–2016)
- Peggy Quince, former Florida Supreme Court justice (1999–2019)

State legislators

- Ben Diamond, former HD-68 (2016–2022)
- John M. McKay, former president of the Florida Senate from SD-26 (1990–2002) (Republican)
- Frank Peterman, former HD-55 (2000–2008)
- Darryl Rouson, SD-16 (2016–present) (Note: Rouson initially co-endorsed Crist and Welch, but later rescinded his endorsement of Welch.)
- Allison Tant, HD-09 (2020–present)

Local officials

- Rick Baker, former mayor of St. Petersburg (2001–2010) (Republican)
- Dan Gelber, former mayor of Miami Beach (2017–2023)
- Manny Diaz, former mayor of Miami (2001–2009) and chair of the Florida Democratic Party (2021–2023)

Individuals

- Manuel Sykes, pastor and civic leader

Newspapers

- Tampa Bay Times (co-endorsement with Gabbard)
Brandi Gabbard

Organizations

- National Organization for Women Florida
- Suncoast Sierra Club

Newspapers

- Tampa Bay Times (co-endorsement with Crist)
Jim Large

Local officials

- Bill Foster, former mayor of St. Petersburg (2010–2014) (endorsed Crist in the runoff)
Ken Welch

State legislators

- Arthenia Joyner, former minority leader of the Florida Senate (2014–2016) from SD-19 (2012–2016)
- Les Miller, former minority leader of the Florida Senate (2004–2006) from SD-18 (2000–2006)
- Michele Rayner, HD-62 (2020–present)
- ~~Darryl Rouson, SD-16 (2016–present)~~ (endorsement rescinded)

Local officials

- Jane Castor, mayor of Tampa (2019–present)
- Patricia Gerard, former Pinellas County commissioner from the 2nd district (2014–2022)
- Kionne McGhee, vice chair of the Miami-Dade County Commission (2024–present) from the 9th district (2020–present)
- Bobby Powell, Palm Beach County commissioner from the 7th district (2024–present)

Labor unions

- SEIU Florida
- St. Petersburg Association of Fire Fighters
- St. Petersburg Police Benevolent Association

Organizations

- Equality Florida
- Stonewall Democrats of Pinellas County

=== Polling ===
Poll source	Date(s) administered	Sample size (Note: Key: A – all adults RV – registered voters LV – likely voters V – unclear)	Margin of error	Kevin Batdorf	Charlie Crist	Brandi Gabbard	Jim Large	Maria Scruggs	Ken Welch	Undecided
St. Pete Polls (Note: Poll sponsored by Florida Politics)	July 27–28, 2026	351 (LV)	± 5.2%	3%	34% (Note: With voters who lean towards a given candidate)	15%	9%	3%	19%	17%
St. Pete Polls	July 18, 2026	379 (LV)	± 5.0%	4%	31%	11%	9%	2%	17%	26%
St. Pete Polls	July 18, 2026	379 (LV)	± 5.0%	4%	35%	12%	9%	2%	18%	20%
St. Pete Polls (Note: Poll sponsored by St. Pete Shines, an organization supporting Crist)	March 25–26, 2026	538 (LV)	± 4.2%	2%	23%	6%	4%	5%	19%	42%
St. Pete Polls	March 25–26, 2026	538 (LV)	± 4.2%	–	–	24%	–	–	32%	44%

=== Debates and forum ===
2026 St. Petersburg mayoral election first round debates and candidate forum
No.	Date	Host	Moderator	Link	Nonpartisan	Nonpartisan	Nonpartisan	Nonpartisan	Nonpartisan	Nonpartisan	Nonpartisan
Key: P Participant A Absent N Not invited I Invited W Withdrawn											
Key: P Participant A Absent N Not invited I Invited W Withdrawn					Kevin Batdorf	Paul Congemi	Charlie Crist	Brandi Gabbard	Jim Large	Maria Scruggs	Ken Welch
1	Jun. 10, 2026	NAACP St. Petersburg Branch No. 5130	Judithanne McLauchlan; Craig Patrick; Marilyn Turman	YouTube	P	N	P	P	A	P	P
2	Jun. 18, 2026	League of Women Voters; St. Petersburg Area		YouTube	P	N	P	P	P	P	P
3	Jun. 24, 2026	Bay News 9 Stronger Together St. Pete Foundation	Josh Rojas	YouTube	P	N	P	P	P	P	P

=== Results ===
2026 St. Petersburg, Florida, mayoral election
Candidate	Votes	%
Charlie Crist	19,436	35.19
Ken Welch (incumbent)	11,451	20.73
Jim Large	9,852	17.84
Brandi Gabbard	9,737	17.63
Maria Scruggs	2,881	5.22
Kevin Batdorf	1,882	3.41
Total votes	55,239	100.00

== Runoff ==
=== Endorsements ===
Charlie Crist

Local officials

- Bill Foster, former mayor of St. Petersburg (2010–2014) (Republican; previously endorsed Large)
- Rick Kriseman, former mayor of St. Petersburg (2014–2022) (previously declined to endorse)
- Bob Ulrich, former mayor of St. Petersburg (1987–1991) (Republican)

Individuals

- Kevin Batdorf, former Shore Acres Neighborhood Association president and former mayoral candidate
- Maria Scruggs, former president of the St. Petersburg NAACP and former mayoral candidate
Ken Welch

State legislators

- Ashley Gantt, HD-109 (2022–present)
Declined to endorse

Individuals

- Jim Large, former St. Petersburg fire chief and former mayoral candidate (Republican)

=== Debates ===
2026 St. Petersburg mayoral election runoff debate
No.	Date	Host	Moderator	Link	Nonpartisan	Nonpartisan
Key: P Participant A Absent N Not invited I Invited W Withdrawn						
Key: P Participant A Absent N Not invited I Invited W Withdrawn					Charlie Crist	Ken Welch
1	Oct. 13, 2026	Bay News 9	Holly Gregory	YouTube	P	P

=== Polling ===
Poll source	Date(s) administered	Sample size	Margin of error	Charlie Crist	Ken Welch	Undecided
St. Pete Polls	October 29–30, 2026	489 (LV)	± 4.4%	54%	34%	12%
St. Pete Polls	October 29–30, 2026	489 (LV)	± 4.4%	55% (Note: With voters who lean towards a given candidate)	35%	10%
St. Pete Polls	October 13, 2026	419 (LV)	± 4.8%	50%	32%	18%
St. Pete Polls	October 13, 2026	419 (LV)	± 4.8%	53% (Note: With voters who lean towards a given candidate)	32%	15%
St. Pete Polls	August 31 – September 1, 2026	509 (LV)	± 4.3%	52%	27%	21%
St. Pete Polls	July 27–28, 2026	351 (LV)	± 5.2%	45%	30%	25%
St. Pete Polls	July 18, 2026	379 (LV)	± 5.0%	44%	28%	28%
St. Pete Polls	March 25–26, 2026	538 (LV)	± 4.2%	36%	31%	33%

=== Results ===
2026 St. Petersburg, Florida, mayoral runoff
Candidate	Votes	%
Charlie Crist	64,858	62.00
Ken Welch (incumbent)	39,758	38.00
Total votes	104,616	100.00

== See also ==
- 2026 Florida elections
  - 2026 Tallahassee mayoral election
- 2026 United States local elections

== Notes ==
Partisan clients
