= 2021 St. Petersburg, Florida mayoral election =

- August 24, 2021; November 2, 2021 (runoff)
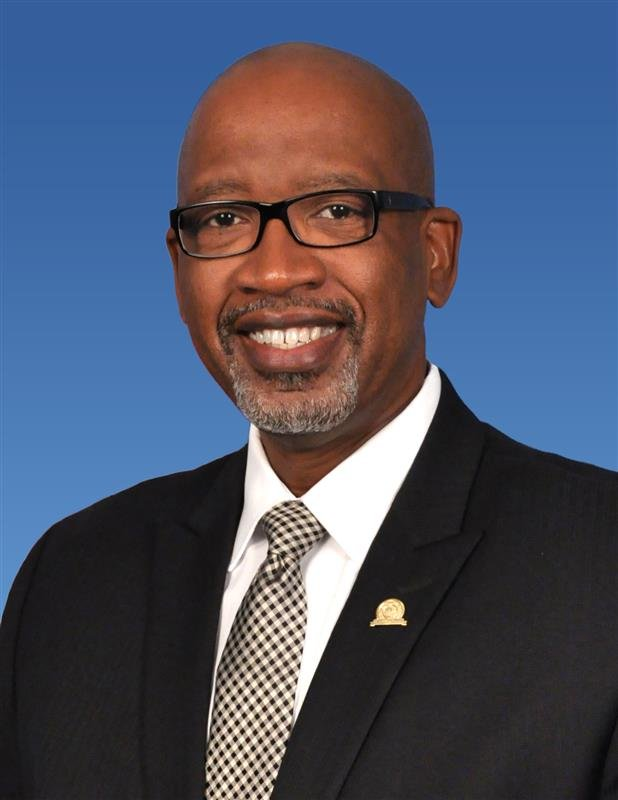

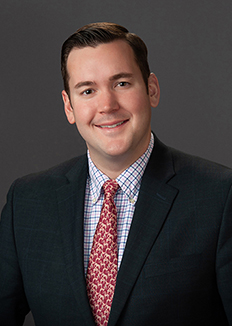

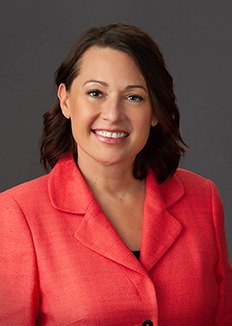

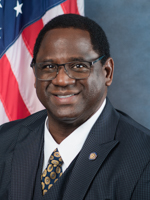
Candidate	Ken Welch	Robert Blackmon	Darden Rice
Party	Nonpartisan	Nonpartisan	Nonpartisan
Alliance	Democratic	Republican	Democratic
First-round	21,812; 39.48%	15,638; 28.30%	9,180; 16.62%
Runoff	38,037; 59.7%	25,712; 40.3%	Eliminated
Candidate	Wengay Newton	Pete Boland
Party	Nonpartisan	Nonpartisan
Alliance	Democratic	Republican
First-round	4,123; 7.46%	3,421; 6.19%
Runoff	Eliminated	Eliminated
- Runoff precinct results Welch: 50–60% 60–70% 70–80% 80–90% >90% Blackmon: 50–60% 60–70% 70–80% No votes
Mayor before election
Rick Kriseman
Democratic
Elected Mayor
Ken Welch
Democratic

The 2021 St. Petersburg, Florida, mayoral election was held on August 24, 2021, with a runoff on November 2 because no candidate received more than 50% of the vote in the first round. It elected the mayor of St. Petersburg, Florida. Incumbent Democratic mayor Rick Kriseman was term-limited and could not seek a third term in office. Municipal elections in St. Petersburg are officially nonpartisan. Former Pinellas County commissioner Ken Welch easily defeated city councilor Robert Blackmon in the runoff. Candidates eliminated in the first round included city councilor Darden Rice, former state representative Wengay Newton, and restaurateur Pete Boland. Welch took office in January 2022, becoming the first black mayor of St. Petersburg.

== Candidates ==
=== Declared ===
==== Democratic Party ====
- Michael Ingram, political science major at the University of South Florida
- Wengay Newton, former state representative, former city councilor, and candidate for the Pinellas County commission in 2020
- Marcile Powers, small business owner
- Darden Rice, city councilor
- Ken Welch, former Pinellas County commissioner

==== Republican Party ====
- Robert Blackmon, city councilor
- Pete Boland, restaurateur

==== Independents ====
- Torry Nelson, teacher

=== Did not file ===
- Paul Congemi, singer-songwriter and perennial candidate (party affiliation: Republican)
- Michael Levinson, poet and perennial candidate (party affiliation: Independent) (ran a write-in campaign)
- Vincent Nowicki, realtor (party affiliation: Independent)

=== Declined ===
- Rick Baker, former mayor (party affiliation: Republican) (endorsed Newton, then Blackmon)
- Jeff Brandes, state senator (party affiliation: Republican) (endorsed Blackmon)
- Ed Montanari, chair of the St. Petersburg City Council (party affiliation: Republican)

== General election ==
=== Endorsements ===
Robert Blackmon (R)

State politicians

- Larry Ahern, former state representative
- Jeff Brandes, state senator
- Kathleen Peters, Pinellas County commissioner and former state representative

Local politicians

- Doreen Caudell, vice mayor of Clearwater
- Kathleen Ford, former St. Petersburg city councilor
- Dick Greco, former mayor of Tampa
- Tyler Payne, mayor of Treasure Island
- Bob Ulrich, former mayor of St. Petersburg
- Larry Williams, former St. Petersburg city councilor

Labor unions

- Florida Gulf Coast Associated Builders and Contractors
- International Association of Bridge, Structural, Ornamental and Reinforcing Iron Workers Local 397
Wengay Newton (D)

Local politicians

- Rick Baker, former mayor of St. Petersburg (Republican)
Darden Rice (D)

State politicians

- Anna Eskamani, state representative
- Annette Taddeo, state senator and nominee for lieutenant governor of Florida in 2014

County officials

- Kevin Beckner, former Hillsborough County Commissioner

Local officials

- Gina Driscoll, St. Petersburg city councilor
- Jim Kennedy, former St. Petersburg city councilor
- Virginia Littrell, former St. Petersburg city councilor

Organizations

- Building Bridges For America
- EMILY's List
- Equality Florida
- Florida College Democrats
- Lesbian PAC
- LGBTQ Victory Fund
- National Organization for Women (co-endorsement with Ken Welch)
- Roadmap for Progress
- Ruth's List
- #VOTEPROCHOICE
- Working Families Party

Labor unions

- Service Employees International Union (co-endorsement with Ken Welch)
Ken Welch (D)

Federal officials

- Charlie Crist, U.S. representative for Florida's 13th congressional district, former Republican-turned-Independent Governor of Florida, Republican and Independent candidate for U.S. Senate in 2010, and Democratic nominee for governor in 2014
- Jim Davis, former U.S. representative for Florida's 11th congressional district and nominee for governor of Florida in 2006

State politicians

- Dave Aronberg, Palm Beach County State Attorney and former state senator
- Charlie Justice, Pinellas County commissioner and former state senator
- Janet Long, Pinellas County commissioner and former state representative
- Michele Rayner, state representative
- Sean Shaw, former state representative

Pinellas County officials

- Ken Burke, Clerk of Court (Republican)
- Deborah Clark, former elections supervisor (Republican)
- Jim Coats, former sheriff (Republican)
- Pam Dubov, former property appraiser (Republican)
- Rene Flowers, county commissioner
- Pat Gerard, county commissioner
- Bob Gualtieri, sheriff (Republican)
- Karen Seel, county commissioner
- Bob Stewart, former county commissioner (Republican)

Local politicians

- Bob Buckhorn, former mayor of Tampa
- Deborah Figgs-Sanders, St. Petersburg city councilor
- Amy Foster, St. Petersburg city councilor
- Charlie Gerdes, former St. Petersburg city councilor
- Connie Kone, former St. Petersburg city councilor
- Rick Kriseman, incumbent mayor
- Lisa Wheeler-Bowman, St. Petersburg city councilor

Individuals

- Bob Dillinger, former public defender
- Bob Devin Jones, playwright
- Kerry Kriseman, wife of incumbent mayor Rick Kriseman
- Bill Law, former president of St. Petersburg College and Tallahassee Community College
- Martha Lenderman, mental health advocate
- Susan McGrath, former chair of the Pinellas County Democratic Party
- John Morgan, lawyer (Independent)
- Andy Oliver, pastor of Allendale United Methodist Church
- Scott Wagman, businessman and candidate for mayor in 2009

Newspapers and publications

- Tampa Bay Times

Organizations

- National Organization for Women (co-endorsement with Darden Rice)
- Pinellas Stonewall Democrats
- Pinellas Young Democrats

Labor unions

- Service Employees International Union (co-endorsement with Darden Rice)

=== Fundraising ===
Campaign finance reports as of May 28, 2021
Candidate (party)	Total raised
Robert Blackmon (R)	did not file
Pete Boland (R)	did not file
Michael Ingram (D)	$1,611
Michael Levinson (I)	$3,319
Torry Nelson (I)	did not file
Wengay Newton (D)	$16,959
Marcile Powers (D)	$533
Darden Rice (D)	$556,053
Ken Welch (D)	$282,469
Vincent Nowicki (I)	$22,117

=== Polling ===
Poll source	Date(s) administered	Sample size (Note: Key: A – all adults RV – registered voters LV – likely voters V – unclear)	Margin of error	Pete Boland	Robert Blackmon	Wengay Newton	Darden Rice	Ken Welch	Other	Undecided
St. Pete Polls/Florida Politics	August 21, 2021	542 (LV)	± 4.2%	5%	27%	6%	17%	37%	3% (Note: Michael Ingram, Torry Nelson, and Marcile Powers with 1%)	5%
St. Pete Polls/Florida Politics	August 5, 2021	749 (LV)	± 3.6%	4%	25%	10%	16%	31%	3% (Note: Michael Ingram, Torry Nelson, and Marcile Powers with 1%)	10%
St. Pete Polls/Florida Politics	July 22, 2021	644 (LV)	± 3.9%	4%	22%	8%	17%	23%	6% (Note: Michael Ingram, Torry Nelson, and Marcile Powers with 2%)	21%
St. Pete Polls/Florida Politics	June 21, 2021	386 (LV)	± 5.0%	2%	12%	13%	12%	20%	7% (Note: Michael Ingram with 3%; Torry Nelson with 2%; Marcile Powers with 1%)	34%
St. Pete Polls/Florida Politics	May 13, 2021	527 (LV)	± 4.3%	–	–	12%	16%	16%	16% (Note: Michael Levinson with 5%; Paul Congemi with 4%; Michael Ingram and Vincent Nowicki with 3%; Marcile Powers with 2%)	40%
St. Pete Polls/Florida Politics	March 2, 2021	581 (LV)	± 4.1%	–	–	14%	15%	14%	14% (Note: Paul Congemi with 5%; Michael Ingram and Michael Levinson with 3%; Vincent Nowicki with 2%; Marcile Powers with 1%)	43%
InsiderAdvantage/Fox 13	January 31, 2021	400 (RV)	± 4.2%	–	6%	8%	7%	12%	0% (Note: Deveron Gibbons with 0%)	67%

=== Debate ===
2021 St. Petersburg mayoral election debate
No.	Date & time	Host(s)	Moderator(s)	Link	Participants							
Key: P Participant N Non-invitee I Invitee					Blackmon	Boland	Ingram	Nelson	Newton	Powers	Rice	Welch
1	June 22, 2021; 7:00 p.m. EDT	Tampa Bay Times; Bay News 9	Steve Contorno; Holly Gregory	Video	P	P	P	P	P	P	P	P

=== Results ===
General election results
Party	Candidate	Votes	%
Nonpartisan	Ken Welch	21,812	39.48
Nonpartisan	Robert Blackmon	15,638	28.30
Nonpartisan	Darden Rice	9,180	16.62
Nonpartisan	Wengay Newton	4,123	7.46
Nonpartisan	Pete Boland	3,421	6.19
Nonpartisan	Michael Ingram	460	0.83
Nonpartisan	Marcile Powers	404	0.73
Nonpartisan	Torry Nelson	211	0.38
Total votes		55,249	100.00

== Runoff ==
=== Candidates ===
- Robert Blackmon (R), city councilor
- Ken Welch (D), former Pinellas County commissioner

=== Polling ===
Poll source	Date(s) administered	Sample size	Margin of error	Robert Blackmon	Ken Welch	Undecided
St. Pete Polls/Florida Politics	October 26, 2021	524 (LV)	± 4.3%	39%	55%	6%
St. Pete Polls/Florida Politics	September 22, 2021	484 (LV)	± 4.5%	36%	53%	11%
St. Pete Polls/Florida Politics	August 21, 2021	542 (LV)	± 4.2%	29%	53%	18%
St. Pete Polls/Florida Politics	August 5, 2021	749 (LV)	± 3.6%	28%	44%	28%
St. Pete Polls/Florida Politics	July 22, 2021	644 (LV)	± 3.9%	24%	32%	**44%**
St. Pete Polls/Florida Politics	June 21, 2021	386 (LV)	± 5.0%	17%	30%	**53%**

Hypothetical polling

with Robert Blackmon and Darden Rice

Poll source	Date(s) administered	Sample size	Margin of error	Robert Blackmon	Darden Rice	Undecided
St. Pete Polls/Florida Politics Archived December 22, 2025, at the Wayback Machine	August 21, 2021	542 (LV)	± 4.2%	30%	**44%**	26%
St. Pete Polls/Florida Politics Archived December 31, 2025, at the Wayback Machine	August 5, 2021	749 (LV)	± 3.6%	28%	**39%**	31%
St. Pete Polls/Florida Politics Archived November 21, 2024, at the Wayback Machine	July 22, 2021	644 (LV)	± 3.9%	23%	**32%**	**45%**
St. Pete Polls/Florida Politics Archived November 19, 2024, at the Wayback Machine	June 21, 2021	386 (LV)	± 5.0%	18%	**28%**	**54%**

with Darden Rice and Ken Welch

Poll source	Date(s) administered	Sample size	Margin of error	Darden Rice	Ken Welch	Undecided
St. Pete Polls/Florida Politics Archived December 22, 2025, at the Wayback Machine	August 21, 2021	542 (LV)	± 4.2%	23%	55%	23%
St. Pete Polls/Florida Politics Archived December 31, 2025, at the Wayback Machine	August 5, 2021	749 (LV)	± 3.6%	25%	47%	27%
St. Pete Polls/Florida Politics Archived November 21, 2024, at the Wayback Machine	July 22, 2021	644 (LV)	± 3.9%	25%	36%	**39%**
St. Pete Polls/Florida Politics Archived November 19, 2024, at the Wayback Machine	June 21, 2021	386 (LV)	± 5.0%	21%	36%	**44%**
St. Pete Polls/Florida Politics Archived November 22, 2024, at the Wayback Machine	May 13, 2021	527 (LV)	± 4.3%	24%	31%	**45%**
St. Pete Polls/Florida Politics Archived November 18, 2024, at the Wayback Machine	March 2, 2021	581 (LV)	± 4.1%	24%	31%	**46%**

=== Endorsements ===
Endorsements in bold were made after the general election.

Robert Blackmon (R)

Federal officials

- **Gus Bilirakis**, U.S. representative for Florida's 12th congressional district

State politicians

- Larry Ahern, former state representative
- **Rudy Bradley**, former state representative
- Jeff Brandes, state senator
- **Nick DiCeglie**, state representative
- **Jim Frishe**, former state representative
- Kathleen Peters, Pinellas County commissioner and former state representative
- **Chris Sprowls**, Speaker of the Florida House of Representatives
- **Jackie Toledo**, state representative

Local politicians

- **Rick Baker**, former mayor of St. Petersburg (previously endorsed Wengay Newton)
- Doreen Caudell, vice mayor of Clearwater
- Kathleen Ford, former St. Petersburg city councilor
- Dick Greco, former mayor of Tampa
- Tyler Payne, mayor of Treasure Island
- Bob Ulrich, former mayor of St. Petersburg
- Larry Williams, former St. Petersburg city councilor

Individuals

- **Kevin Harrington**, entrepreneur and "Shark" from the TV show Shark Tank
- **Art Laffer**, economist and Reagan Administration advisor

Labor unions

- Florida Gulf Coast Associated Builders and Contractors
- International Association of Bridge, Structural, Ornamental and Reinforcing Iron Workers Local 397
Ken Welch (D)

Federal officials

- **Kathy Castor**, U.S. representative for Florida's 14th congressional district (2007-present)
- Charlie Crist, U.S. representative for Florida's 13th congressional district, former Republican-turned-Independent Governor of Florida, Republican and Independent candidate for U.S. Senate in 2010, and Democratic nominee for governor in 2014
- Jim Davis, former U.S. representative for Florida's 11th congressional district and nominee for governor of Florida in 2006

State politicians

- Dave Aronberg, Palm Beach County State Attorney and former state senator
- **Janet Cruz**, state senator and former Minority Leader of the Florida House of Representatives (2016–2018)
- Charlie Justice, Pinellas County commissioner and former state senator
- Janet Long, Pinellas County commissioner and former state representative
- Michele Rayner, state representative
- Sean Shaw, former state representative

Pinellas County officials

- Ken Burke, Clerk of Court (Republican)
- Deborah Clark, former Elections Supervisor (Republican)
- Jim Coats, former Sheriff (Republican)
- Pam Dubov, former Property Appraiser (Republican)
- Rene Flowers, county commissioner
- Pat Gerard, county commissioner
- Bob Gualtieri, Sheriff (Republican)
- Karen Seel, county commissioner
- Bob Stewart, former county commissioner (Republican)

Local politicians

- Bob Buckhorn, former mayor of Tampa
- **Jane Castor**, mayor of Tampa
- Deborah Figgs-Sanders, St. Petersburg city councilor
- Amy Foster, St. Petersburg city councilor
- Charlie Gerdes, former St. Petersburg city councilor
- Connie Kone, former St. Petersburg city councilor
- Rick Kriseman, incumbent mayor
- **Darden Rice**, St. Petersburg city councilor and 2021 mayoral candidate
- Lisa Wheeler-Bowman, St. Petersburg city councilor

Individuals

- Bob Dillinger, former public defender
- Bob Devin Jones, playwright
- Kerry Kriseman, wife of incumbent mayor Rick Kriseman
- Bill Law, former president of St. Petersburg College and Tallahassee Community College
- Martha Lenderman, mental health advocate
- Susan McGrath, former chair of the Pinellas County Democratic Party
- John Morgan, lawyer (Independent)
- Andy Oliver, pastor of Allendale United Methodist Church
- Scott Wagman, businessman and candidate for mayor in 2009

Newspapers and publications

- Tampa Bay Times

Organizations

- **Equality Florida** (previously endorsed Darden Rice)
- National Organization for Women (co-endorsement with Darden Rice)
- Pinellas Stonewall Democrats
- Pinellas Young Democrats
- **Sierra Club**

Labor unions

- Service Employees International Union (co-endorsement with Darden Rice)

=== Results ===
Runoff results
Party	Candidate	Votes	%
**Nonpartisan**	**Ken Welch**	**38,037**	**59.7%**
Nonpartisan	Robert Blackmon	25,712	40.3%
Total votes		**63,749**	**100.00**
