= Science and Technology Education Innovation Center =

Coordinates: 27.792982°N 82.744547°W

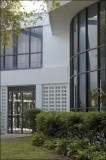
The Science Center of Pinellas County

The Science and Technology Education Innovation Center, formerly known as the Science Center of Pinellas County, is an educational center in St. Petersburg, Florida, United States. It occupies 7 acres (28,000 m^{2}) of land located on 22nd Avenue North, in West St. Petersburg, located near the Tyrone Mall.

== History ==
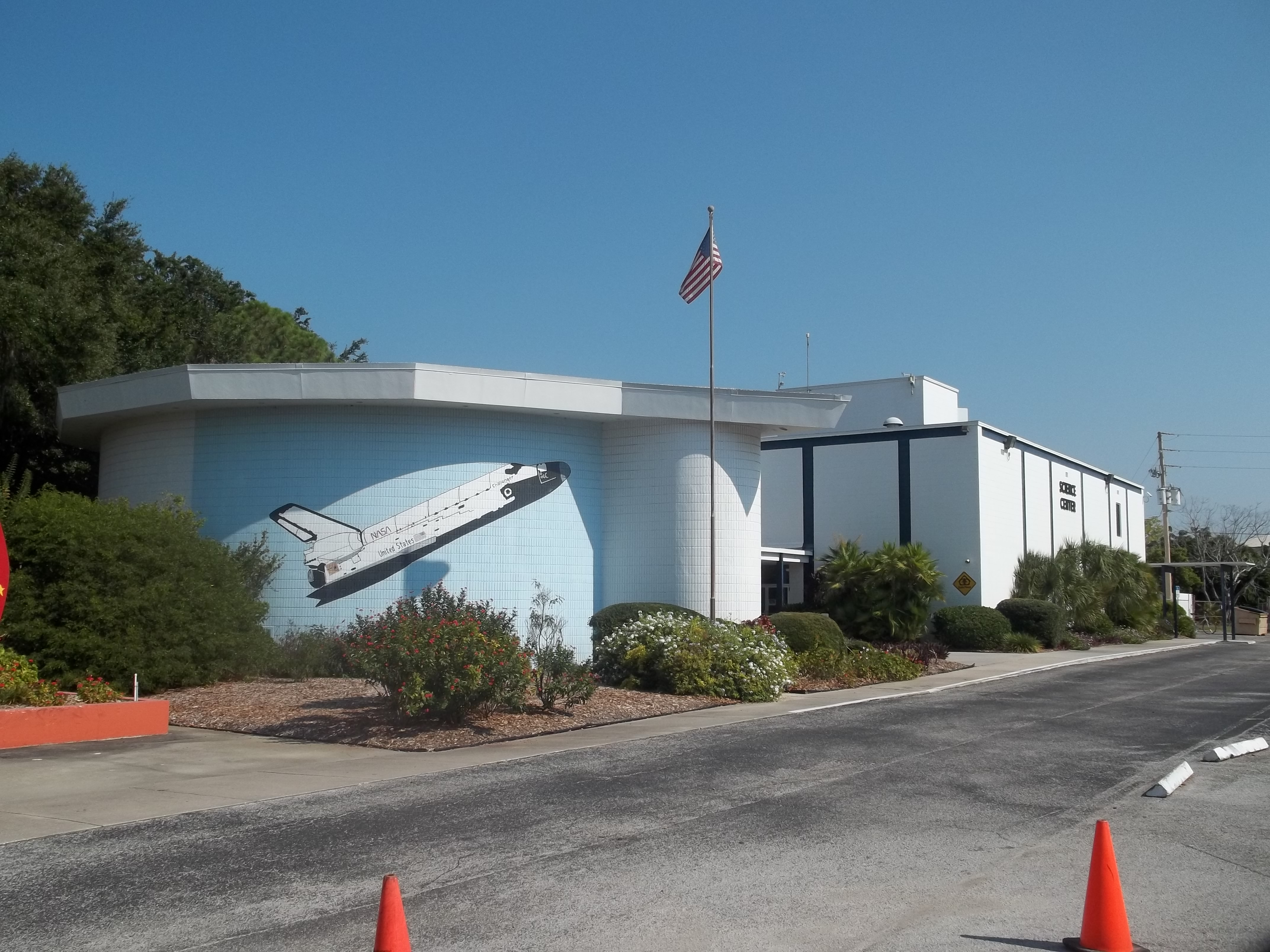

The Science Center is a non-profit organization founded in St. Petersburg in 1959 by William Guild and Nell Rodgers Croley. It was the first science center of its kind in the world, and it operates on donations and grants. Its mission is to inspire interest in and to promoting the understanding of all sciences.

In 1966 the present main building was completed. During the 1960s and early 70s, the center offered after-school and weekend classes for students from Kindergarten through middle school in such subjects as biology, chemistry, electronics and astronautics. Today about 22,000 children visit the building each school year during field trips. The Science Center frequently works with Pinellas County schools, and all summer camp classes and science camps taught at the Science Center meet FCAT guidelines.

== Features ==
=== Margaret Ewell Dickins Marine Exhibit ===
In 2000 the Margaret Ewell Dickins Marine Room opened. The exhibit includes numerous aquariums filled with marine creatures such as a snowflake moray and a black sea bass. The most popular feature is a 600-gallon touch tank where visitors can touch starfish, horseshoe crabs, guitarfish, slipper lobsters, hermit crabs and sea urchins. In addition, the Science Center holds marine biology classes for children in this room during science summer camps and school breaks.

=== Observatory ===
In 1997, the Carol Samuels Observatory opened. The observatory provides visitors with a view of cosmic events and features through a 16-inch (410 mm) Meade telescope. The research-grade telescope is the only one available to the public in Pinellas County in a non-university setting. The St. Petersburg Astronomy Club holds a handful of events at the Science Center throughout the year, and helps the public use the Meade Telescope to view comets, eclipses, or planets.

=== White Gardens ===
The idea for the White Gardens came from Starley M. White, chairman of the Board of the former National Bank. Surrounding the White Gardens is a "Walk of States", a mosaic tile walkway made up of more than 50 sections, one section for each state in the United States. A segment of the walk is dedicated to the Seminole tribe and Andrew Jackson. Each of the 50 states are displayed in order of their admission into the union. The walkway shows an image of the state, including the state's bird and flower. Beside each state's tile walk the state's rock is on display. The Walk of States was created by St. Petersburg artist Attillio Puglisi. It was moved to the Science Center in 1971.

== Planetarium ==
In 1971 the Discovery Center was built. This building houses the Columbia Planetarium. In 2003 the Spirit of Columbia Theater and Planetarium opened. The Planetarium offers a showing daily which is included in the $5 admission fee. The Science Center's digital planetarium is the only one available to the public in Pinellas County. It can show the sky as it was on any specific date in history and when the center is rented out for birthday parties or anniversaries, it is often set to show the night sky as it appeared the night of the event commemorated.

== Optical lab ==
The Science Center houses the only optical lab for the public to grind telescope mirrors in the southeastern United States. The lab is operated by the St. Petersburg Astronomy Club. The club welcomes the public to visit the optical lab on Saturdays between 1 p.m. and 4 p.m. to build a homemade telescope from scratch.

== Gift shop ==
A small gift shop features science and space-themed toys which are available to purchase at reasonable prices.

== Future ==
In 2019 the City of St. Petersburg acquired the facility with plans to tear down the building. City Councilmember Robert G. Blackmon brought together a coalition including State Representative Linda Chaney, State Senator Darryl Rouson, and Congressperson Charlie Crist to raise $5.5 million towards its restoration.

== See also ==
- List of science centers
