= St. Petersburg green benches =

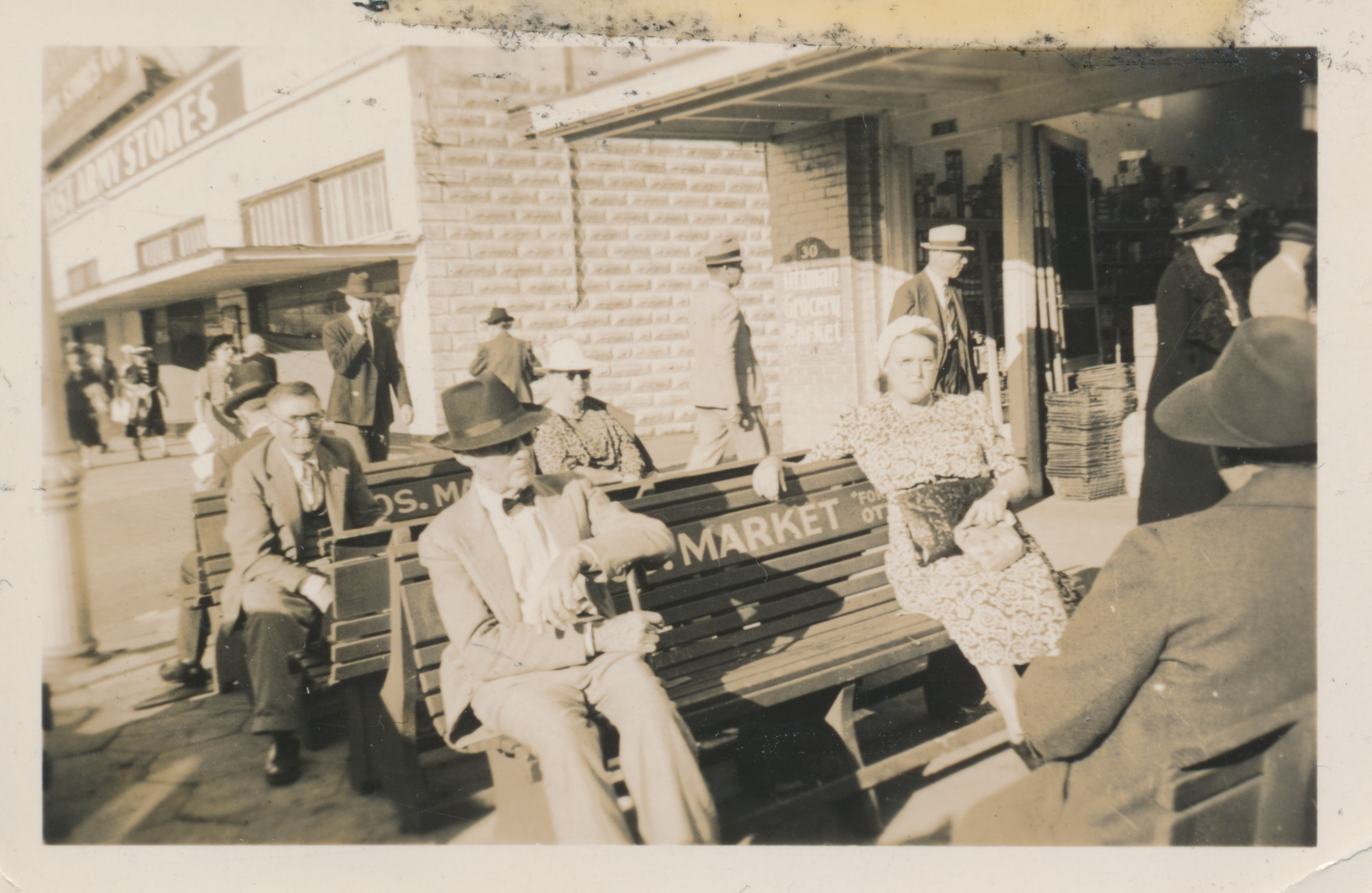
Past residents of St. Petersburg, FL relaxing on green benches in the downtown region.

The city of St. Petersburg, Florida popularized green benches (typical metal bench, painted green) in the early 1900s. They quickly grew in popularity to become a hospitality trademark of the city and drew tourists in from around the United States.

== Emergence of the benches ==
The first green benches appeared in St. Petersburg in 1908 under the supervision of Noel Mitchell, a real estate developer and salesman. The goal of this project was to provide structures on which people could comfortably socialize in the downtown area. Fond of Mitchell's idea, many around the city started to follow suit and installed their own renditions of the benches. Shortly following this explosion of road-side seating, the benches won national recognition when 1916 Mayor Al Lang imposed an ordinance to make all of the benches green. The benches lined the streets of St. Petersburg in long rows, and it was estimated that at their peak, there were around 7,000 of them in the city. For white folk, these benches served as a charming place to socialize with friends, neighbors, and the like. According to many white residents, the presence of the benches highlighted the romance of the city and symbolized hospitality.

== Racial segregation ==
However, the well-known green benches did not hold a hospitable, romantic city image to all. The benches began to add to the profuse discrimination in St. Petersburg that was already exemplified by numerous forms of explicit and implicit racism. While no laws were implemented to restrict black residents from enjoying the benches, it was custom that police officers would only permit the white community to use them. However, black care-takers were allowed to use the benches while accompanying white children. While there existed other forms of excluding the black population from St. Petersburg's city life, the green benches were the most prominent example. As a result, some residents believe that the green benches continue to be "an ugly symbol" of a segregationist era in history and specifically in the city of St. Petersburg.

== Controversial preservation of benches ==
The green benches were removed from the streets of St. Petersburg in the 1960s during the era that youth culture became a national obsession. This then led to the city growing vulnerable to feelings of marginality and insecurity, and to such a great extent that city officials required the removal of the green benches. The city decided to remove them because they believed it gave St. Petersburg an elderly, more dated image, instead of the newer, younger one they were striving for in order to keep the tourism industry afloat. Currently, there are a few local businesses that have continued to use the green benches as a positive symbol, such as Green Bench Brewery, the 4th Street Chick-fil-A, and Ollie's Outlet. Although many of the white residents may overlook this, or feel that it was an important part of history that should be brought back, the black population does not take the symbolism lightly. Many black residents who were raised in St. Petersburg believe that all green bench-related things should not be supported because they humiliate the black population. Even though the benches are gone, there are still local businesses that handcraft and sell them, such as GreenBenches & Co. in Clearwater. Green benches from this company are currently located all over the Bay area, such as in Busch Gardens, outside the Florida Aquarium, and at Tropicana Field.

== Gallery ==
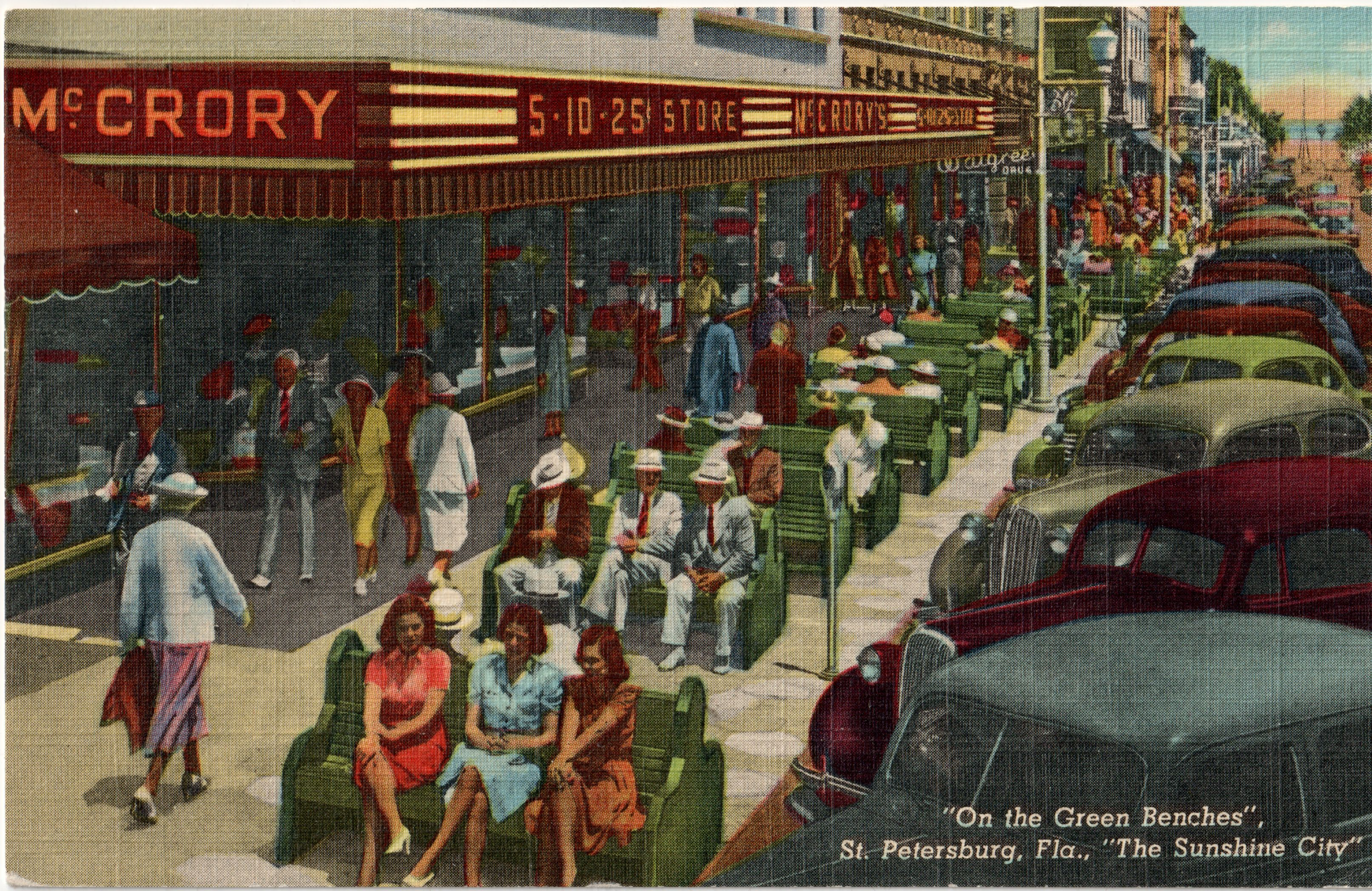

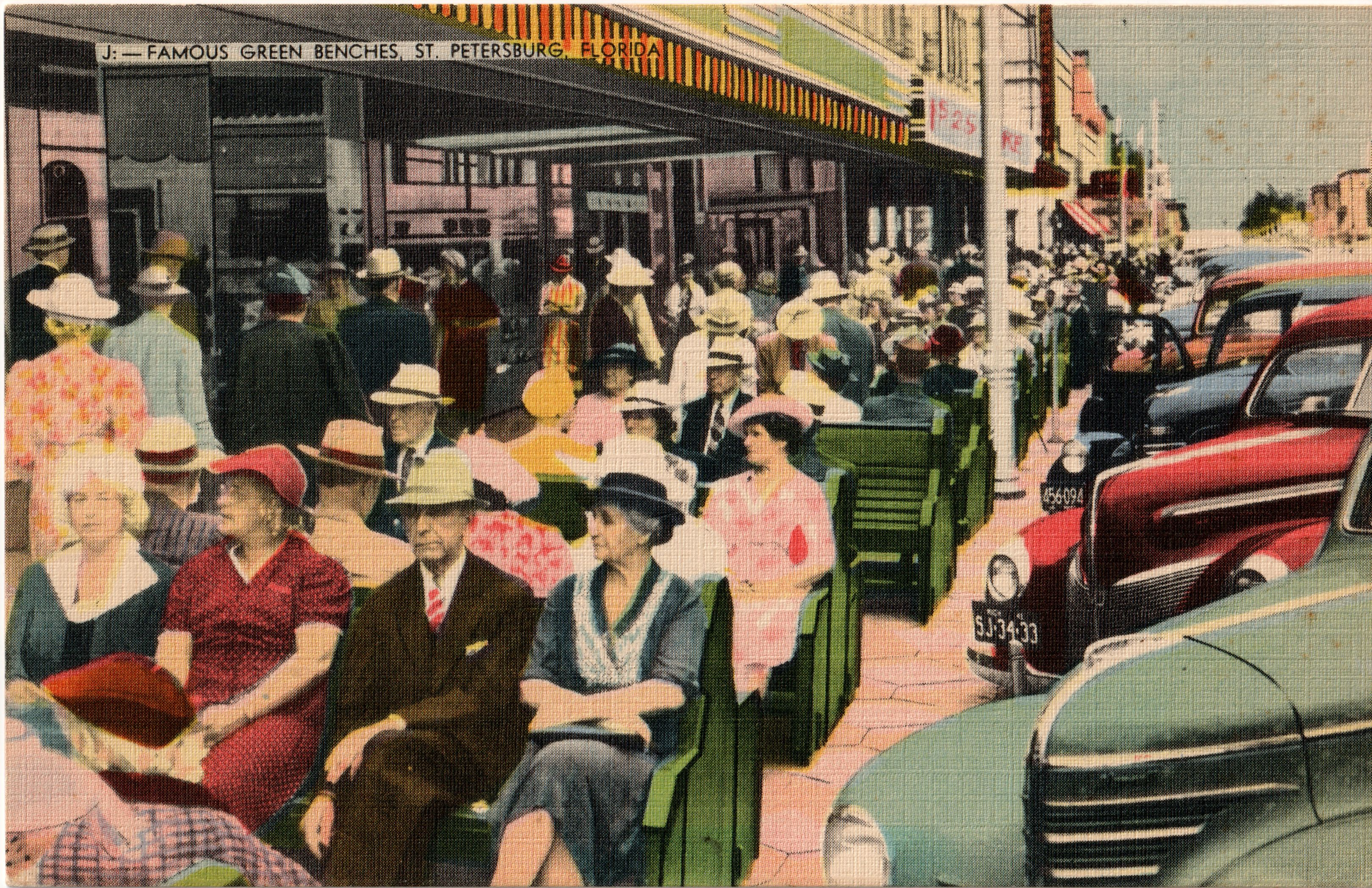

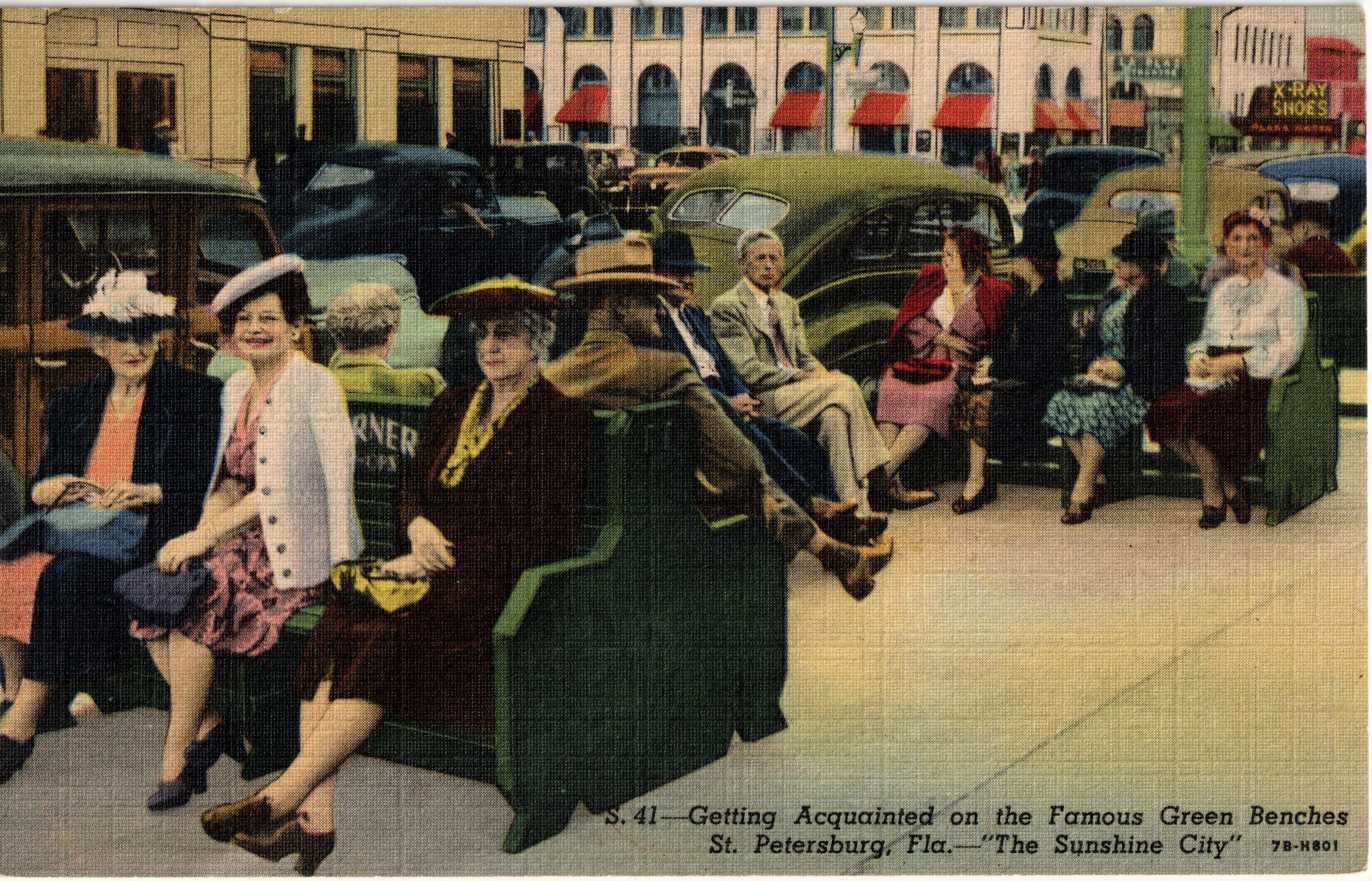
