= Herman Goldner =

American politician (1916–2010)

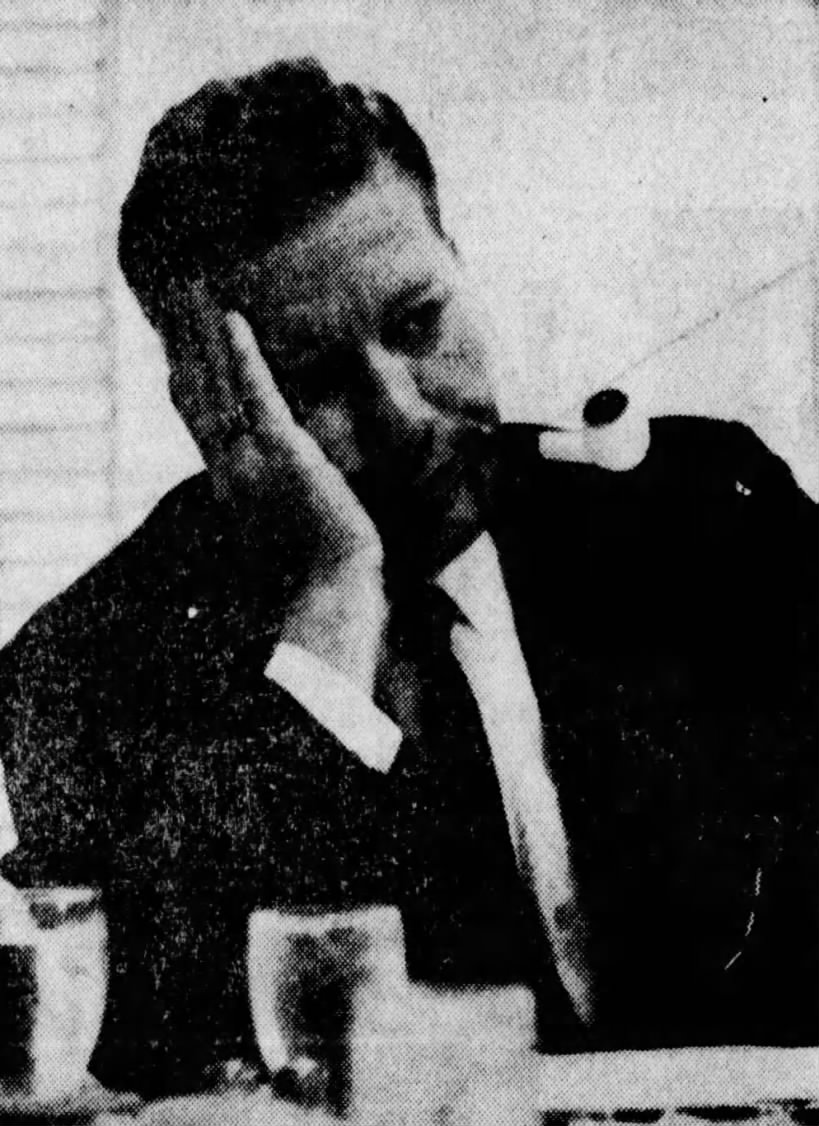
- Goldner in 1961

Mayor of St. Petersburg
- In office 1961–1967
- Preceded by: Edward F. Brantley
- Succeeded by: Don Jones
- In office 1971–1973
- Preceded by: Don L. Spicer
- Succeeded by: Randolph Wedding

Personal details
- Born: November 12, 1916 Detroit, Michigan, U.S.
- Died: September 9, 2010 (aged 93) Virginia Beach, Virginia, U.S.
- Party: Democratic (after 1972)
- Other political affiliations: Republican (until 1972)
- Spouse: Winifred Herlan Munyan (m. 1938)
- Children: 2
- Education: Miami University; Western Reserve University; Harvard Business School

Military service
- Branch/service: United States Navy
- Battles/wars: World War II

Herman Wilson Goldner (November 12, 1916 – September 9, 2010) was a lawyer and politician in the United States. He served four terms as mayor of St. Petersburg, Florida. Originally a Republican, he switched parties and became a Democrat during Richard Nixon's presidency.

== Early life ==
Goldner was born on November 12, 1916, in Detroit, Michigan. He received his undergraduate degree at Miami University, law degree at Western Reserve University, and business degree from Harvard Business School. Goldner moved to St. Petersburg in 1949.

== Political career ==
He served as Mayor of St. Petersburg from 1961 to 1967 and 1971 to 1973. In the 1964 election, he refused to support Barry Goldwater and instead endorsed Lyndon B. Johnson. He helped organize a regional planning organization.

Goldner championed the elimination of St. Petersburg city ordinances that practiced segregation. He defended murals by George Snow Hill in St. Petersburg's city hall with caricatured depictions of African Americans. The mural was torn down by Joseph Waller who later became African People's Socialist Party leader Omali Yeshitela.

In 1972, he switched his party affiliation from Republican to Democratic and endorsed Edmund Muskie.

== Personal life ==
He married his wife Winifred Herlan Munyan, on November 3, 1938. They both had two sons, Brian and Michael.
