= List of neighborhoods in St. Petersburg, Florida =

This is a list of neighborhoods in St. Petersburg in Pinellas County, Florida, United States. Many of the city's neighborhoods have been renamed, redefined and changed since the city's founding in 1888. As such, the exact extents of some neighborhoods can differ from person to person. The following is the list of all the city's major neighborhoods, including any corresponding sub-neighborhoods within them.

St. Petersburg, Florida, has more than 100 neighborhoods.

Neighborhoods in St. Petersburg
Neighborhood	Demonym	Population 2010	Population/ Km²	Sub-neighborhoods	Coordinates
Allendale					
Allendale Terrace					
Arlington Park					
Azalea Homes					
Bahama Shores					
Barcley Estates					
Bartlett Park					
Bayboro					
Bayou Highlands					
Bayway Isles					
Big Bayou					
Bonita Bayou					
Brighton Bay					
Broadwater					
Campbell Park					
Carillon					
Casler Heights					
Causeway Isles					
Caya Costa					
Central Oak Park					
Childs Park					
Clam Bayou					
Coquina Key					
Crescent Heights					
Crescent Lake					
Cromwell Heights					
Crossroads					
Disston Heights					
Dome City					
Downtown (North Downtown and University Park)					
Driftwood					
Eagle Crest					
Eden Isle					
Edgemoor					
Euclid Heights					
Euclid St. Paul's					
Five Points					
Fossil Park					
Fruitland Heights					
Garden Manor					
Garden Manor Lake					
Gateway					
Graham-Rogall					
Grand Central					
Greater Pinellas Point					
Greater Woodlawn					
Harbor Isle					
Harbordale					
Harris Park					
Harshaw Lake Park					
Highland Grove					
Highland Oaks					
Historic Kenwood					
Historic Old Northeast/North Shore					
Historic Roser Park					
Historic Park Street					
Historic Uptown					
Holiday Park					
Isla del Sol					
James-Clearview					
Jordan Park					
Jungle Prada					
Jungle Terrace					
La Puerta Del Sol					
Lake Euclid					
Lake Maggiore Park					
Lake Maggiore Shores					
Lake Pasadena					
Lakewood Estates					
Lakewood Terrace					
Live Oaks					
Magnolia Heights					
Mangrove Bay					
Mangrove Bayou					
Mariners Pass					
Maximo					
Meadowlawn					
Mel-Tan Heights					
Melrose-Mercy/Pine Acres					
Methodist Town					
Mobel Americana/Americana Cove					
Northeast Park					
North Kenwood					
Oakwood Garden/Pinefield View					
Old Bayside/St. Petersburg Marina					
Old Northeast					
Old Pasadena					
Old Southeast					
Palmetto Park					
Pasadena					
Pasadena Bear Creek					
Pasadena Vista/West Lake Estates					
Patrician Point					
Perkins					
Perry Bayview					
Pinellas Point/The Pink Streets					
Placido Bayou					
Ponce De Leon					
Ponderosa Shores					
Renaissance					
Riviera Bay					
Riviera Bay Subdivision					
Roser Park Historic District					
Round Lake Historic District/Round Lake					
Sheryl Manor					
Shore Acres					
Skyway Marina					
Snell Gardens					
Snell Isle					
Sterling Manor					
Sunset Drive					
Tangerine Terrace					
Tanglewood					
Thirteenth Street Heights					
Thirty-First Street Neighborhood					
Tropical Shores					
Twin Brooks					
Tyrone Landing					
Tyrone Park					
Venetian Isles					
Waterway Estates					
Weedon Island Preserve					
West Neighborhood					
Westminster Heights					
Wildwood Heights					
Windward Pointe					
Winston Park					
Woodlawn Circle					
Woodlawn Oaks					
Wyngate Townhomes					
Yacht Club Estates					
