= Noel A. Mitchell =

American businessman and politician

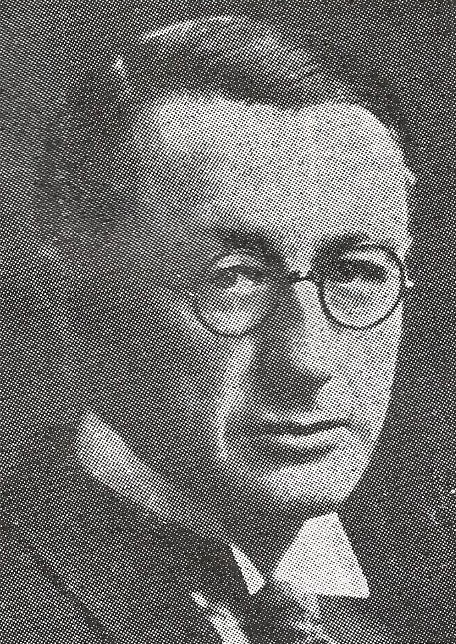
- Mitchell, circa 1920

Mayor of St. Petersburg
- In office April 6, 1920 – November 15, 1921
- Preceded by: Al Lang
- Succeeded by: Frank Pulver

Personal details
- Born: April 27, 1859 Block Island, Rhode Island; United States
- Died: October 6, 1936 (aged 77)
- Spouse: Adalaide B. Mitchell (1901–1929)
- Children: 1

Noel A. Mitchell (April 27, 1859 – October 6, 1936; born in Block Island, Rhode Island) was a businessman and advertiser who built considerable wealth through the sale of Atlantic City salt water taffy, and a burgeoning real estate business in St. Petersburg, Florida, which would later fund his successful run for mayor of St. Petersburg.

== Mitchell's Original Atlantic City Salt Water Taffy ==
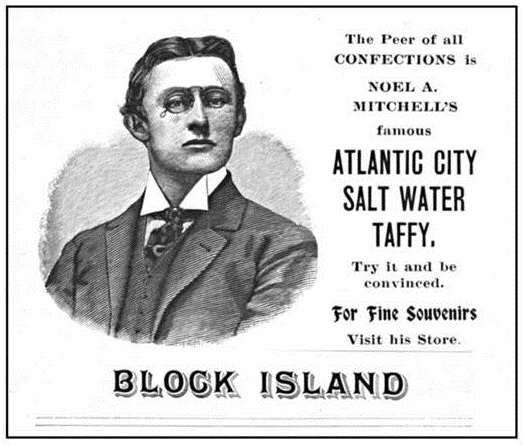
Noel A. Mitchell, taffy man

Noel Mitchell, the son of Mary Jane and Edward Mitchell, was born on January 9, 1874. Coming from a humble background, Mitchell attended public school in Rhode Island and later enrolled in a course in business college. In 1892, Mitchell’s climb to success began with his creation of a successful business venture in the sale of salt water taffy. Advertised as "a mixture of easy-flowing sweetness and the salty Atlantic Ocean", Mitchell carefully crafted his brand. On every box of taffy sold, Mitchell's face was featured prominently in the center to increase his notoriety (later he would use his candy to advertise St. Petersburg by including post cards within every box). Mitchell also offered to ship his taffy nationwide for a flat fee of 40 cents, making it affordable to purchase and easily attainable outside the immediate area. Soon, no longer was Mitchell's brand limited to Atlantic City and the surrounding area. Instead, Mitchell's brand was becoming a nationally recognized product, sold in states all over the nation.

Now a successful businessman, Mitchell defended his brand vigorously. On July 6, 1911, The Evening Independent published news of an impending lawsuit against a Connecticut firm owned by P. A. Atwood for infringing upon Mitchell's trademark use of "salt water". In this instance, Mitchell successfully defended his brand, securing both damages and compensation for this infringement.

== Mitchell's Corner and The City of Green Benches ==
After visiting St. Petersburg in 1904, Noel Mitchell decided to make Florida his permanent home. By 1907, Mitchell purchased the entirety of the Durant block at Fourth and Central for $15,000, opening a real estate business on what would soon be known as “Mitchell’s Corner”. Taking advantage of a booming real estate market, Mitchell became one of the leading real estate salesmen specializing in the sale and development of beach property.

There were many rivals during the real estate boom and the ability to differentiate oneself was key. One of the ways Mitchell did this was by employing the use of an extremely large and colorful sign in front of his real estate building, on which Mitchell called himself "The Sand Man" (given his choice to sell beach property, the name is appropriate). A large sign was not the only item that hung outside of Mitchell's office however, as it was not unusual to see large Tarpon fish (as depicted in the picture) hanging beneath the sign above his office. This was Mitchell's way of advertising what St. Petersburg could offer to those who enjoyed fishing.

Before long, Mitchell became a champion for St. Petersburg, as while he not only developed numerous ways of advertising his business, he also used his position as a leader of the chamber of commerce to boost not only himself nationally, but also the city itself. Mitchell tried everything to garner national attention, including the distribution of motion pictures showing celebrations in St. Petersburg, sending post cards depicting local wonders to every person who bought his Original Atlantic City Salt Water Taffy and even helped to finance the creation of an air boat hangar for one of the first commercial airline companies in the United States. This airline made trips across the bay area. Mitchell would later fly on the airline himself.

Mitchell's real estate business was not always a booming success. His lack of early success led to a creative idea that in turn led St. Petersburg further onto the national spotlight and earned it the name, "The City of Green Benches". In the beginning, Mitchell quickly noticed that he was not getting nearly the foot traffic he had hoped when starting his real estate company. Even though he had set his office up in St. Petersburg, his location was not ideal. Many customers seemed to have little desire to walk to his shop. Noticing that those of who did come into his shop were often looking for a place to sit, Mitchell realized that he might attract more business if he provided a place for the guests to sit. Initially Mitchell ordered 50 bright orange benches and installed them outside of his shop. The results were almost instantaneous. Not only did people start coming from all over just to sit on his benches, due to the large nature of the benches, Mitchell was able to advertise his business at the same time. Quickly other business owners began to ask Mitchell if they could borrow some of his benches; others had their own made. Soon enough, there were thousands of assorted benches throughout St. Petersburg.

While the benches went a long way towards providing comfort for visitors and residents alike, the benches did nothing for the appearance of St. Petersburg. To improve upon the appearance of the benches, Al Lang, elected mayor in 1916, passed an ordinance that required all benches to be both green and of a uniform size. While initially unhappy, shop keepers grew to understand the necessity of such an ordinance and grudgingly accepted it. This left St. Petersburg with thousands of benches for visitors and shoppers to rest, and yet they were uniform and tasteful so as to not be an eyesore. In an era of unintended consequences, Mitchell created more national notoriety for St. Petersburg by simply trying to advertise his shop than many of his other ploys.

== Mayor and later disgrace ==
After unsuccessfully running for mayor between 1912 and 1920 Mitchell would not be denied. In his bid for mayor in 1920 Mitchell showed that he was not only a shrewd businessman but also politically astute. In 1919, women in the St. Petersburg area had recently won a referendum allowing them to vote for the first time. Mitchell capitalized on women's desire to vote and began actively courting them. Mitchell, at last, won the mayoral race and took office in 1920 to become the 12th Mayor of St. Petersburg, beating the incumbent Al Lang.

Ever the business man, while mayor, Mitchell noticed a growing trend of tourism and realized that "the chief concern of the Sunshine City" was tourism and saw value in St. Petersburg's continued hospitality towards visitors. The effect of such thinking would lead to the blocking of a levy whose purpose was to require a "tuition charge" be placed upon tourists in an effort to pay for local education.

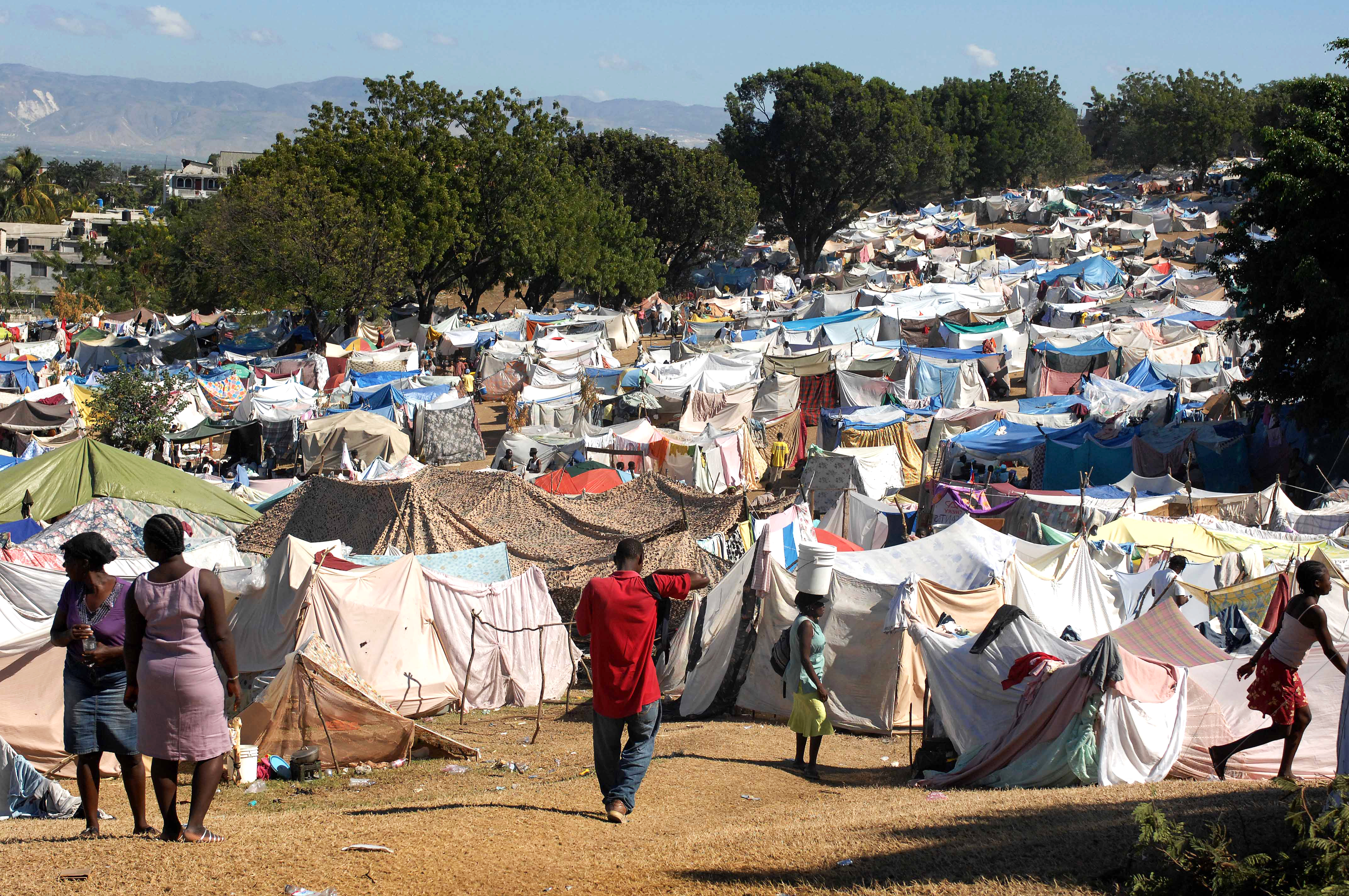
An example of a tent city

In his time as mayor, Mitchell's creativity would not be diminished. Noticing an increase of "Tin Can Tourists" due to a lack of hotel accommodations, Mitchell seized the opportunity to create more headlines for St. Petersburg. In August 1920, Mitchell offered St. Petersburg municipal property to create a "tent city" which not only provided a free place for visitors to stay, but also offered amenities such as garbage collection and toilet facilities for free. Quickly the site was overcrowded as over one hundred families took up residence within the lot in less than two weeks. Due to its early success and now overcrowding, businessmen began to see the makings of an opportunity. Men began to envision a large plot of land outside the city limits where the tourists could live. It would be designed in a particular way so that it could serve also as a public park, set with pristine pathways, gardens and archways. Much to Mitchell's disappointment however, not everyone in St. Petersburg was happy with the attention the tent city brought. Even conscious of their national image the city council, against the urgings of Mitchell, abolished the tent city ending the local governments involvement indefinitely. This did not ban local individuals from continuing in the footsteps of Mitchell, and soon outside of city limits other sites began to arise. Unlike Mitchell's experiment however, these lots would charge modest fees for those who stayed in them. Later, their popularity would only increase as the economy in the United States worsened and slipped into the Great Depression.

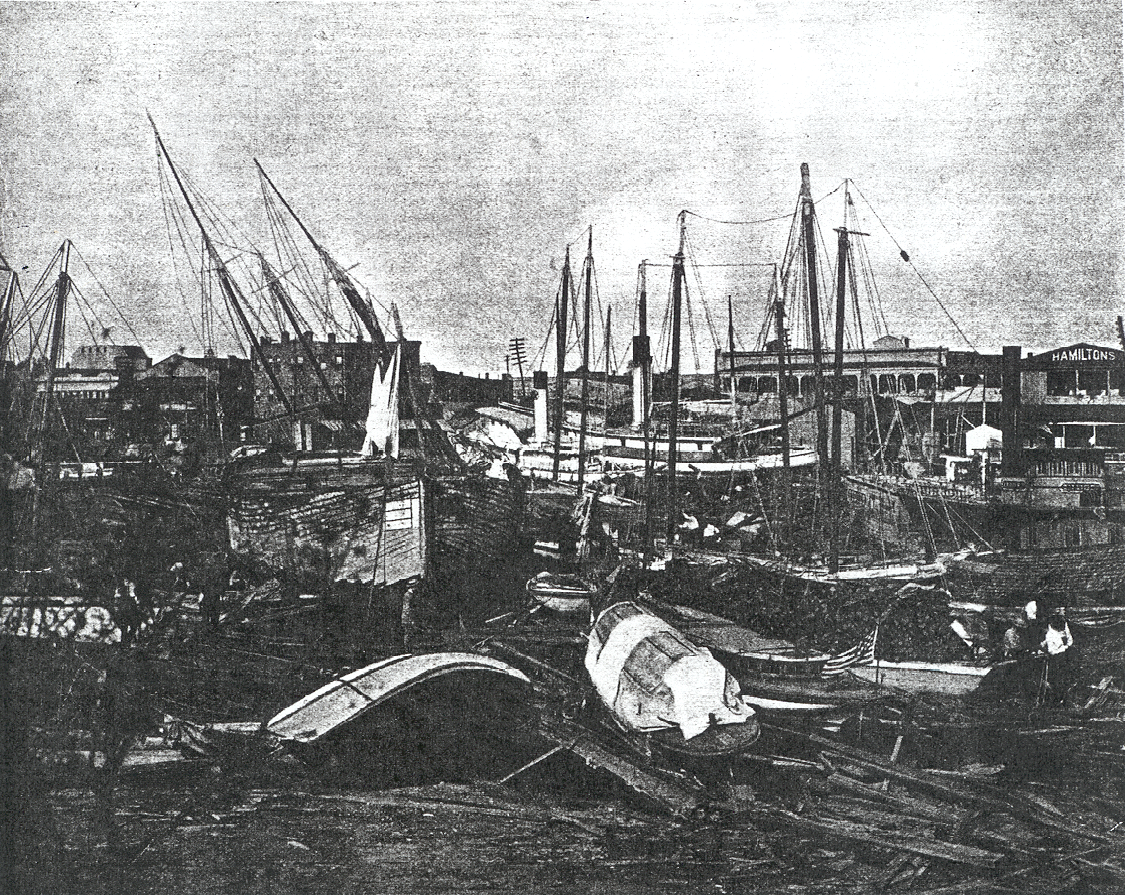
Hurricane damage in Florida

In 1921 tragedy fell upon the City of St. Petersburg in the form of a hurricane. With winds upwards of 100 mph and a storm surge of over 6 feet, many areas in and around St. Petersburg suffered massive damage. Forever the champion of St. Petersburg, Mitchell along with others did whatever they could do to alleviate the fears of both visitors and local citizens by fixing and hiding damage as quickly as possible. Downplaying the risk of future damage by storms was also a common tool in securing continued faith in the new city. At this point however, the growth of St. Petersburg would not be stopped. St. Petersburg's survival of the storm would do nothing but provide encouragement for both tourists and residents alike, securing the continued success and prosperity of St. Petersburg going forward.

Mitchell's outward and friendly manner would bring an early end to his tenure as Mayor of St. Petersburg. Ever the socialite, Mitchell loved throwing lavish parties for his friends and constituents. While throwing a party during the prohibition era was not illegal, drinking was. In November 1921, the local police raided a party Mitchell hosted in his mayoral office and later charged him with public drunkenness. After Mitchell's refusal to resign, Thorton Parker filed an affidavit for Mitchell's recall and received more than 185 signatures. Mitchell in turn published a formal statement that took up half a page within The Evening Independent in which he defended himself, denied his drunkenness and unleashed a scathing attack on his accusers. Mitchell was recalled on November 15, 1921 and although he immediately announced his intention to run again for the Mayor of St. Petersburg and later for the Governorship of Florida, he would never again attain office in the State of Florida or anywhere else.

== Family ==
Noel A. Mitchell was married to Adalade B. Mitchel, of New London, Connecticut, in 1901. The Mitchells would later divorce in 1929. Mitchell was survived by his adopted daughter Mrs. Gladys Seeley.
