= Corinne Freeman =

American politician (1926–2014)

Mayor of St. Petersburg, Florida
- In office April 1, 1977 – 1985
- Preceded by: Charles E. Schuh
- Succeeded by: Edward L. Cole Jr., MD.

Personal details
- Born: November 9, 1926 Brooklyn, New York City, New York
- Died: May 11, 2014 (aged 87)
- Education: Adelphi University

Corinne Freeman (November 9, 1926 – May 11, 2014) was the mayor of St. Petersburg, Florida, United States, serving from April 1, 1977 until 1985. She was the city's first female mayor. After serving as mayor she would be a member of the Pinellas County School Board for the next 10 years.

== Early life ==
Freeman was born in Brooklyn in 1926 to Sidoni Daxe and was raised there with her much younger brother, Henry. She chose nursing as a profession and graduated from Adelphi University in the U.S. Public Health Service Division of Nursing program. She then became a nurse with the Army Cadet Corp, which had been started by Eleanor Roosevelt, whom she met. There she served during WWII as a nurse rotating through several hospitals and institutions. She met her future husband Mike Freeman early in her career, and they married in 1947. She and Mike had two sons, Michael and Stephan. She and Mike raised their two sons in Marblehead, Massachusetts. Early in her political life, she became involved in the League of Women Voters. There, she assisted in the production of multiple political debates, and thereby met some of the great political leaders of the 1950s and 1960s.

In 1968, she and Mike moved their family to St. Petersburg, Florida. Mike was a devoted husband and supporter until his death in 2001.

== Career ==
Freeman was active with local women's Republican clubs in Massachusetts and Florida when she lived in those respective states. Corrine was one of four Jewish mayors of St. Petersburg.

She died of cancer on May 11, 2014, at the age of 87.
