= Wengay Newton =

American politician

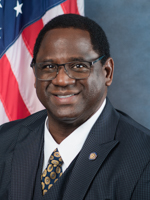

Member of the Florida House of Representatives from the 70th district
- In office November 8, 2016 – November 3, 2020
- Preceded by: Darryl Rouson
- Succeeded by: Michele Rayner

Personal details
- Born: August 27, 1963 (age 62) St. Petersburg, Florida
- Party: Democratic
- Education: ITT Tech (AS)

Wengay M. Newton (born August 27, 1963) is an American politician from Florida. A Democrat, he served two terms in the Florida House of Representatives from 2016 to 2020, representing parts of Pinellas, Sarasota, Manatee, and Hillsborough Counties.

== Early life and career ==
Newton was born and raised in the Midtown South neighborhood of St. Petersburg as one of eight children of a divorced mother. Newton graduated from Northeast High School in 1981 and attended ITT Tech where he earned an associate degree in Electronics Engineering. After graduating from ITT Tech, Newton went to work for Xerox, where he worked for eighteen years.

== Political career ==
Newton first ran for the St. Petersburg city council in 2007. His opponent was Gershom Faulkner, outreach director for Congresswoman Kathy Castor. Despite Faulkner being considered the establishment candidate, Newton ultimately prevailed and was elected to the city council. In 2011, while running for reelection, Newton faced Faulkner in a rematch. Newton increased his share of the vote from 52 to 66%.

Newton ran for the 70th State House District in 2015 as incumbent representative Darryl Rouson was term-limited. Newton ultimately won the Democratic nomination with 60% of the vote over Dan Fiorini and C.J. Czaia. In the general election, Newton faced Republican Cori Fournier, a realtor. Newton beat Fournier with 76% of the vote.

In 2020, Newton opted to run for a seat on the Pinellas County Commission, losing to Rene Flowers.

On December 19, 2020, Newton filed and declared his candidacy for Mayor of St. Petersburg in the 2021 St. Petersburg mayoral election. Despite being endorsed by former Republican Mayor Rick Baker, Newton received only 7.5% of the vote in the first round and was eliminated.

In September 2021, Newton announced a run for his old state house seat as incumbent Michele Rayner-Goolsby is not running for reelection.

In August 2025, Newton faced Kyandra Darling for the 62nd district of the Florida State House, and lost. The race was to replace Michele Rayner, who was running for Florida State Senate’s 16th district. .
