= Larry Ahern (politician) =

American politician (born 1955)

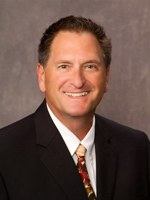

Member of the Florida House of Representatives
- In office November 2, 2010 – November 6, 2018
- Preceded by: Janet Long
- Succeeded by: Nick DiCeglie
- Constituency: 51st district (2010–2012); 66th district (2012–present)

Personal details
- Born: April 26, 1955 (age 71) Detroit, Michigan, U.S.
- Party: Republican
- Spouse: Maureen Byrne Ahern
- Children: Lauren Ahern, Lindsay Anderson, Sarah Byrne
- Profession: Small businessman

Larry Ahern (born April 26, 1955) is a Republican politician and a former member of the Florida House of Representatives, representing the 66th District, which includes northwestern Pinellas County, stretching from Clearwater to Seminole, from 2012 to 2018. Ahern previously represented the 51st District from 2010 to 2012. He ran for Pinellas County Commission in 2020, losing to incumbent Janet Long.

== History ==
Ahern was born in Detroit, Michigan, and served in the United States Air Force from 1973 to 1977, including a tour at the Iraklion Air Station from 1975 to 1977. He then moved to the state of Florida in 1978, where he started a swimming pool remodeling business.

== Florida House of Representatives ==
In 2010, Ahern ran for the Florida House of Representatives from the 51st District, which included parts of Pinellas County, against incumbent Democratic State Representative Janet Long. A contentious election ensued, in which Ahern campaigned on "conservatism and a business-friendly attitude," and in which Long aired a controversial television advertisement "in which her son, a war hero, characterized Ahern as a coward." Ultimately, Ahern defeated Long and Tea Party candidate Victoria Torres, receiving 50% of the vote to Long's 44% and Torres's 6%.

When Florida House districts were redrawn in 2012, Ahern was redistricted into the 66th District, which included most of the territory that he had previously represented in the 51st District. He was opposed by Mary Louise Ambrose, the Democratic nominee and the owner of an insurance agency. Ambrose was endorsed by the Tampa Bay Times, which criticized Ahern for voting "in lockstep with leadership and special interests to the detriment of his constituents." However, Ahern was re-elected over Ambrose with 53% of the vote.

While serving in the legislature, Ahern sponsored legislation that would "make the death of an 'unborn child' a separate crime from an offense committed against the mother," which Democrats opposed because "[a] person would not have to know a woman is pregnant to be charged with a crime." Additionally, he authored legislation that would make prosecuting identity theft easier by eliminating a legal requirement that the stolen personal information be "used to commit fraud."

In April 2017, Ahern filed paperwork to run for the Pinellas County Commission District 6. Ahern lost in the Republican primary to Kathleen Peters. In 2020, Ahern ran for the at-large District 1 seat against incumbent Janet Long. In the general election, Ahern lost a close race, receiving 49.42% to Long's 50.58%.

== See also ==
- Florida House of Representatives
