= Euclid St. Paul's =

Euclid St. Paul's Neighborhood is a residential section of St. Petersburg, Florida which began to be developed in the 1920s in a former orange grove. The neighborhood has a mixture of home styles and sizes, and the Pinellas County Schools headquarters are located there. Bill Freehan, later an all-star catcher for Major League Baseball's Detroit Tigers, first played football as a member of a team at a former Catholic high school in the neighborhood.

The neighborhood encompasses 240 acres (0.97 km^{2}) with boundaries that are major traffic arteries and commercial zones: Dr. Martin Luther King Jr. Street North on the east; and 16th Street North on the west, 22nd Avenue North on the north side, and 9th Avenue North forming the southern boundary. Downtown St. Petersburg, the Central Avenue Business District and Baywalk are all 1.5 to 2 miles (2.4 to 3.2 km) away. Both St. Anthony's Hospital and Edward White Memorial Hospital are less than a mile away, as is access to Interstate-275.

The neighborhood contains diverse styles of homes and varying lot sizes but no city-owned parks, although there are several nearby, including Booker Creek Park, Sprague Park, Huggins-Stengel Field and Stewart Field, Woodlawn Park, Crescent Lake Park, Round Lake Park, Mirror Lake Park, Blanc Park, and Euclid Lake Park. In the western section there are more modest homes of a more uniform style. The northeastern section has the most duplex, triplex and small apartment buildings. Many homes have garage apartments accessible from alleys, and nearly every home has access to an alley.

== History ==
The Euclid St. Paul's Neighborhood began as an orange grove in 1912 in a part of town most residents regarded as "out in the country." Co-owned by Mary Eaton, the founder of the St. Petersburg Memorial Historical Society, the 20-acre (81,000 m^{2}) grove was bounded by MLK (then known as Euclid Blvd.) and 12th Streets and 14th and 15th Avenues.

A few homes were constructed in the neighborhood prior to the land boom. One of the oldest homes in the neighborhood, located at 12th Street and 10th Avenue, was built in 1917 as a grand mansion but was used in later years as a sanitarium. Another old home in the neighborhood, located on 19th Avenue and 11th Street, served as a bunkhouse for Eaton's orange pickers.

John B. Green, a developer, purchased the land in 1921 and began developing it into an exclusive neighborhood of various architectural styles. The first subdivisions were Edina-Garden of Eden, Hilcrest, and Old Kentucky. Minimum dollar values and square-foot restrictions were placed on the homes constructed. The homeowner's association at the time designated that homes along 15th Avenue were to be worth at least $6,000 (a hefty price tag for the 1920s) and contain a minimum of 6 rooms exclusive of bathrooms, closets and porches.

During St. Petersburg's land boom of the 1920s, Euclid Place, as it was originally called, continued to grow. The neighborhood spread on the east from 9th Street North (formerly Euclid Boulevard) west to 16th Street North, and from 13th and 14th Avenues northward to 22nd Avenue. As development continued, smaller houses were built.

== Local institutions ==
In 1925, Euclid School was opened in the neighborhood. The grammar school taught several generations of neighborhood children. The school was turned into apartments in the 2010s. Euclid Methodist Episcopal Church was built in 1936 adjacent to Euclid School on 10th Avenue it is closed now and being turned into an event space.

In 1929, St. Paul's Catholic School opened its doors to students, and a Roman Catholic Mass was held regularly in the school gymnasium until the church was built in 1939. The school was originally co-educational, but the last class with boys graduated in 1956. In the 1950s, sometimes 3,000 fans showed up for Friday night Blue Eagles football games in the neighborhood. Bill Freehan, who was a freshman on the football team the final year that boys were at the high school, went on to become an all-star catcher for Major League Baseball's Detroit Tigers. After the 1955-56 school year, the school became a girls-only high school as boys went to the new Bishop Barry Catholic school on Ninth Avenue North. In 1969, St. Paul's closed as a high school when the girls departed for Notre Dame Academy. The school continues to teach children from Kindergarten through eighth grade. St. Paul's Catholic Church celebrated its 75th Jubilee in 2004.

The Euclid St. Paul's Neighborhood Association hosts several social functions throughout the year. Association meetings are held monthly at St. Paul's Catholic School on the first Thursday of the month. The association is also active in fundraising, crime watch and the City Team. In 2005, the city Neighborhood Partnership program awarded the association $3,375 to plant 29 trees (crape myrtle, magnolia, oak, maple) along rights of way.

Starting in 2005, neighborhood volunteers have organized a "ghost tour" of Euclid St. Paul in which guides lead people to various homes where fictional spooky stories are told by costumed hosts. The tour is meant to be low-tech, old-fashioned, family-friendly event.
