= Karen Seel =

American politician

- Born: Clearwater, Florida
- Education: University of Florida; American University
- Occupation: Public servant
- Spouse: Ron Seel

Karen Seel is the District 5 Commissioner in Pinellas County, Florida.

Seel was appointed to the board in 1999 by Governor Jeb Bush to fill an unexpired term. She was first elected in 2000 to a four-year term and again in 2004. Seel attended the University of Florida for her bachelor's degree. In addition she earned her Master of Business Administration from American University.
