= Janet Long =

American politician

Janet C. Long
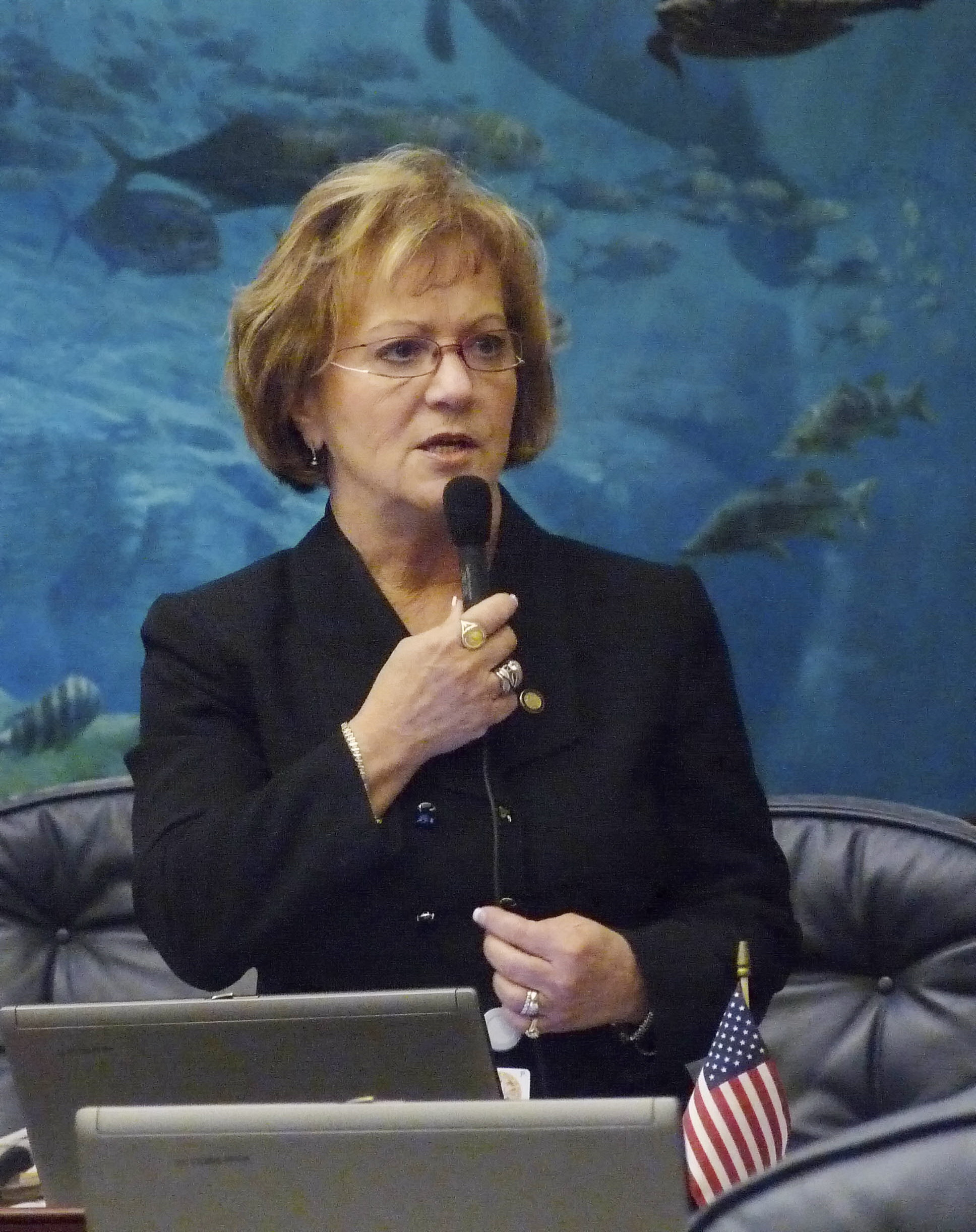

Pinellas County Commissioner, District 1 (at large)
- In office November 6, 2012 – November 19, 2024
- Preceded by: Neil Brickfield
- Succeeded by: Chris Scherer

Member of the Florida House of Representatives from the 51st district
- In office 2006–2010
- Preceded by: Leslie Waters
- Succeeded by: Larry Ahern

Member of the Seminole, Florida City Council
- In office 2002–2006

Personal details
- Born: November 6, 1944 (age 81) West Stewartstown, New Hampshire
- Party: Democratic
- Spouse: Richard L. Long II
- Children: Anissa Raiford; Paul J. Long; Richard "Logan" Long III
- Education: Nasson College; Eckerd College; St. Petersburg College
- Occupation: Director of Advancement / Assistant to the President, Clearwater Central Catholic High School
- Profession: Politician

Janet C. Long (born November 6, 1944) is a US Democratic politician and educator who served as a member of the Pinellas County Commission for the at-large District 1. Previously, she represented District 51 in the Florida House of Representatives from 2007 to 2011, and was a member of the Seminole, Florida City Council from 2002 to 2006.

== Biography ==
Long was born in West Stewartstown, New Hampshire. She graduated from Fryeburg Academy. She attended Nasson College, Eckerd College and St. Petersburg College, but obtained no degree. She is the director of advancement at Clearwater Central Catholic High School.

Prior to her elected career, she served as a legislative aide and as a deputy commissioner for the Florida Department of Insurance.

== Political career ==
=== Seminole City Council ===
Long announced her candidacy for one of three available seats on the Seminole City Council in November 2001. At the time, she owned a consulting firm and served on the tree advisory committee. She was also a member of the Greater Seminole Area Chamber of Commerce Board of Directors, and served on the governor's tax reform task force.

The Greater Seminole Area Chamber of Commerce held a forum for the City Council candidates in February 2002. Each candidate had a brief time to make an opening statement, answer two questions, and make a closing statement. Long cited her three decades of experience, including her advocacy work with the Insurance Commission, her work on government committees, and her receptiveness to community input. She advocated care in annexation. She received the support of the Seminole Professional Fire Fighters Association. She was elected to the Seminole City Council in March 2002, her first publicly elected office. Of the three people elected to the council in that race, she had the most votes.

She ran unopposed for re-election to the City Council in 2004. In 2005, a resolution by the U.S. Conference of Mayors Climate Protection Agreement urged cities to "take actions to reduce global warming pollution." The Seminole City Council declined to support the resolution by a vote of four opposed to three in support. Long voted to support the resolution, along with Mayor Dottie Reeder and Patricia Hartstein.

=== Florida Legislature ===
==== 2006 campaign ====
In her first state legislative campaign, Long was elected to the Florida House in 2006, narrowly defeating her former colleague, former Seminole Mayor Dottie Reeder. She replaced Leslie Waters, who had been term limited, and who declined to run for the District 51 seat in 2008. Long had run unopposed in the Democratic primary. Long had resigned her position on the Council in March 2006, saying that it would be a conflict of interest to continue on the council while running for State office. She chided Mayor Reeder for remaining as mayor while campaigning. At a Seminole Chamber of Commerce luncheon meeting in February 2006, Long identified education, insurance, and affordable housing as top priorities.

During the campaign, Long suggested solutions for the Florida insurance crisis, while acknowledging the complexity of the issues. She recommended making Citizen's Property Insurance Co, the state-run "insurer of last resort", more like a business, assessing risk and operating within a balanced budget. She recommended forming a consortium of coastal states to share costs in dealing with windstorms and catastrophic loss. She also recommended looking into "insurance savings accounts" to deal with catastrophic loses. These accounts would be funded with money from premiums paid by citizens and the private insurers. She received the endorsement of the St. Petersburg Times, as well as the Tampa Bay Builders Association and The Pinellas Realtor Organization.

In November, she defeated Republican Dottie Reeder with a 554-vote margin, flipping the seat to the Democrats.

As a freshman representative, Long was appointed to the Insurance Committee, the Education Innovation & Career Preparation Committee, Military & Veterans' Affairs Committee, and the Schools & Learning Council. She was one of three Pinellas County representatives to support school vouchers (corporate-tax-credit scholarships), along with Bill Heller and Darryl Rouson.

Long sponsored a bill that would prohibit local governments from spending public money on "political advertisement or electioneering communication." She opposed a 2008 bill, HB 257, that required pregnant women to have a sonogram before undergoing a first-trimester abortion. She and state Senator Dennis Jones supported legislative action to require airports, universities and state agencies to recycle. Opponents of the bill said it would cost too much.

In August 2008, Long told the Pinellas Park Kiwanis Club that she supports taxing Internet sales as a possible solution to state budget problems. She said that Florida had grown markedly since the tax codes were first written, and that they needed updating.

Prior to the 2008 election, Long spoke of the need to create a wind insurance program and improve property insurance. She also expressed concern over the tax burden of low-income seniors, first-time home buyers, and small business owners. She advocated improvements in health care, such as electronic record keeping and affordable drugs for seniors. She received the endorsement of the Sierra Club and the St. Petersburg Times. The Republican Party was impressed enough with her that it invited her to change parties. The Times lauded what it called her "clear-headedness" for her stances on reviewing special taxing districts (such as the Pinellas Park Water Management District), looking into consolidating state law enforcement agencies, and modifying the requirements for Bright Futures scholarships.

In 2008, Long defeated Republican Christopher Peters, a lifeguard at Fort De Soto Park, with 58 percent of the vote. He was a substitute candidate, recruited to run after Republican Terry Sanchez withdrew her candidacy in September. After the election, Long said she looked forward to working on tax reform and health care legislation.

In 2010, Long was defeated by Republican Larry Ahern, who won with 50% of the vote compared to Long's 44%.

=== Pinellas County Commission ===
In 2012, Long decided to run for the at-large District 1 seat on the Pinellas County Commission, held by incumbent Republican Neil Brickfield. Her campaign was focused on a controversial vote by Brickfield to take fluoride out of the drinking water. She defeated Brickfield with 55% of the vote. She ran for re-election and won by a large margin in 2016, and defeated her successor in the state house, Larry Ahern, in a tight race in 2020, winning with 50.6% of the vote.

== Personal life ==
Long is married to Richard L. Long with three children, Anissa, Paul, and Richard, five grandchildren, and one great-grandson. Her son Paul was nominated to receive the Distinguished Flying Cross for his heroism in Afghanistan on May 18, 2008.

== Bibliography ==
- "State House Districts 44, 46, 47, 48, 51 elections". Bay News 9. November 4, 2008.
- "Representative Janet C. Long". Florida House of Representatives.
- "Representative Janet C. Long - Biography". Project Vote Smart: The voter's self-defense system. Project Vote Smart.
