= Ken Welch =

American politician

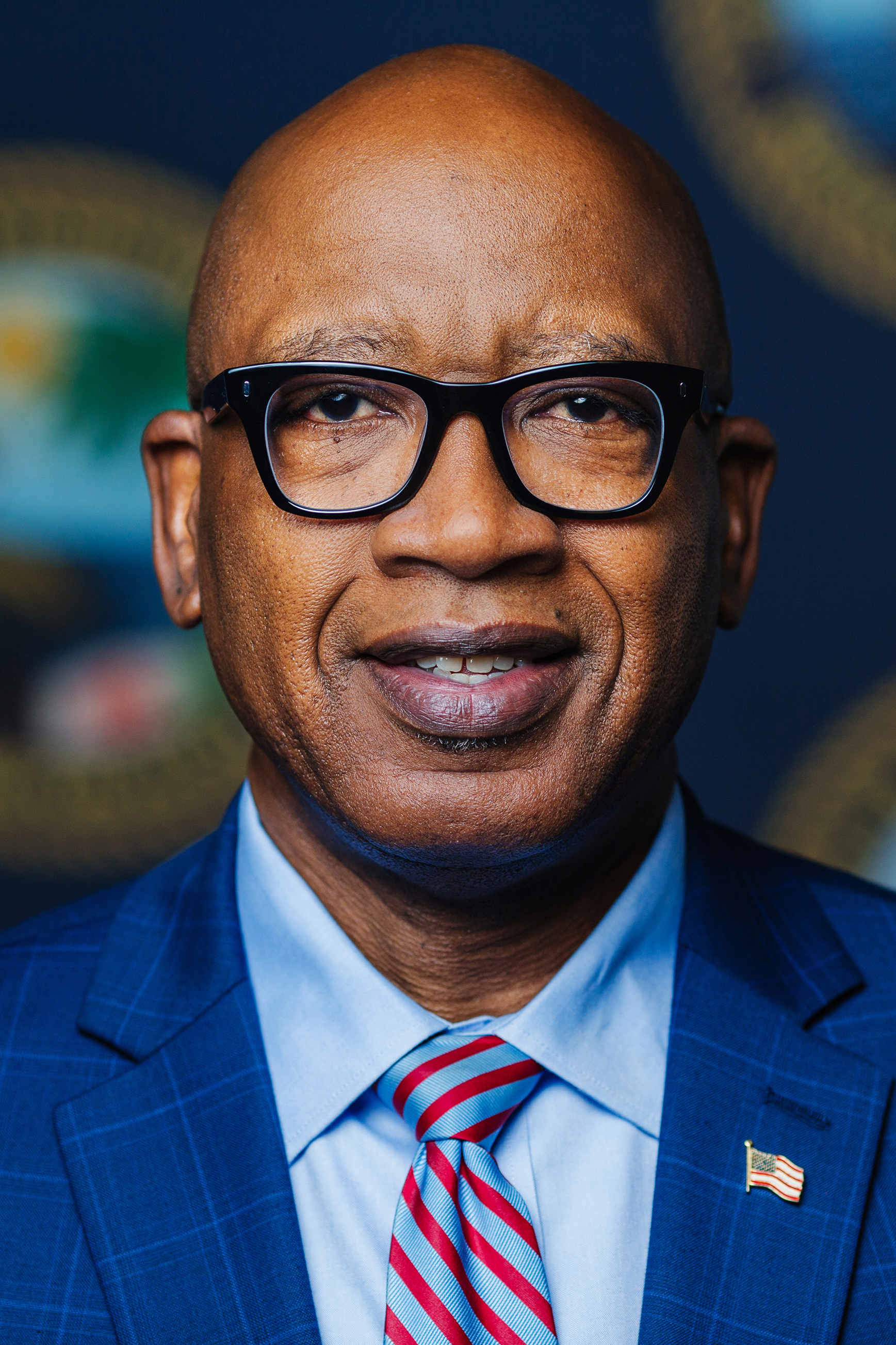

Mayor of St. Petersburg
- Incumbent
- Assumed office January 6, 2022
- Preceded by: Rick Kriseman

Member of the Pinellas County Commission from the 7th district
- In office 2002–2022

Personal details
- Born: August 15, 1964 (age 62) St. Petersburg, Florida, U.S.
- Party: Democratic
- Education: University of South Florida (BA); Florida A&M University (MBA)
- Website: Campaign website

Kenneth T. Welch (born August 15, 1964) is an American politician serving as mayor of St. Petersburg, Florida. A member of the Democratic Party, Welch served on the county commission of Pinellas County, Florida. Welch is the city's first African-American mayor.

== Early life and education ==
Welch was born August 15, 1964, in St. Petersburg, Florida. His father, David, is a former member of the St. Petersburg city council and founded an accounting company, where Ken worked. Welch, a third-generation St. Petersburg resident, grew up in the Gas Plant District, which was repurposed to build Tropicana Field.

Welch attended Melrose and Bay Point Elementary, Bay Point Middle School, and Lakewood Senior High School. He later attended University of South Florida where he studied accounting and received his bachelor's degree. He received his Master of Business Administration from Florida A&M University.

== Career ==
After college, Welch returned to St. Petersburg as an accountant for Florida Power Corporation. He also served as Technology Manager for his father's small accounting firm. After years of community service, Ken became the first Commissioner elected to represent County Commission District 7 in St. Petersburg, only the second African American commissioner in the history of Pinellas County. He served on the county commission for 20 years. The Tampa Bay Times criticized him in 2018 for lobbying on behalf of his wife after she was fired from a publicly funded faith-based reading program. Questions were raised over expenditures she made on behalf of the organization. Although the Times called the move an "obvious conflict of interest", Welch was "unrepentant" and insisted he was simply defending his wife. In October 2021, the Florida Ethics Commission found no probable cause that Welch misused his position while lobbying fellow elected officials

=== Mayoralty ===
Welch ran for mayor of St. Petersburg in the 2021 election. He defeated Robert Blackmon in the general election on November 2, and was sworn in to the role on January 6, 2022. He announced the cancellation of a previous request for proposals (RFP) for the Tropicana Field site where the Tampa Bay Rays play. Welch said a new RFP would include a stadium for the Rays and affordable housing.

Welch increased the amount of down payment assistance the city offered individuals that are first-time home buyers from $40,000 to $60,000.

Citing what he considered to be an insufficient amount affordable housing in the project's plans, Welch canceled approval of a redevelopment of city-owned land which had been approved prior to his mayoralty. The cancelled project would have included residential development, a hotel, and a Moffitt Cancer Center campus to downtown St. Petersburg. The denial was due to the quantity of affordable housing units that would accompany the development, with 35 of the 120 total units earmarked as income restricted not meeting goals. “This was a strategic decision based on community benefit, shared priorities and the significant value of the subject city land,” Welch said. “While we welcome the addition of this facility and hoped we could successfully negotiate this plan to meet our community benefit goals, negotiations did not meet needed affordable housing". In September 2024, the city announced developer Third Lake Partners was awarded a contract to purchase the site below appraised value for "condos, offices, shops and hotel space", despite the project having no affordable or workforce housing component at all.

Welch established a $500 monthly stipend for lower-paid municipal employees whose positions hold residency requirements. Approximately 250 employees were eligible at the time this was implemented.

Welch advocated for the city to study the impact of Albert Whitted Airport. Decommissioning the airport for recreation or development use has been proposed multiple times, dating back to 1935. The notion of reassessing the airport proved controversial among those who support retaining the airport.

The Junior League of St. Petersburg cancelled their Mayoral Ball, thrown for every Mayor since Rick Baker's reelection in 2006, when Welch declined to attend. The event was to be circus themed, titled "Under the Big Top", prompting third party accusations of racism and inappropriateness, as Welch is St. Petersburg's first Black mayor. Upon hearing of Welch's displeasure, the Junior League offered to change the theme, but did not receive a response from Welch or his team. "He has nothing to do with a circus, clowns, animals," said Rev. J.C. Pritchett, president of the Interdenominational Ministerial Alliance. "He's a gentleman. A kind gentleman and a public servant."

On September 1st 2022, Communications Director Janelle Irwin Taylor resigned her position, citing a "hostile work environment, lack of communication or guidance and overall culture of bullying" at City Hall, citing Deputy Mayor Stephanie Owens as the main culprit. The following morning, Mayor Welch placed Owens on administrative leave, pending investigation. Two hours later, Owens resigned her position. A week later, Welch addressed the resignations, defending Owens. “First, I do not believe that there is a pervasive, hostile work environment,” Welch said. “In the case of the statement of our former Comms Director and her resignation letter, there were no complaints filed, nor was I informed of a problem until the day before that letter was sent to the city.”

A Tampa Bay Times review of City Hall key card swipes found that during his first eight months as Mayor, Welch was in his office only 34% of total workdays, excluding weekends and holidays. Welch contended the pattern of attendance painted an incomplete picture, and that he stays up most nights until 9 or 10 PM "doing his homework". “I just want to be clear that the taxpayers are getting their money’s worth,” Welch added. “Every waking moment I’m working for this city.”

In July 2024, Welch authorized $250,000 of bonus money to be given to 17 high ranking city employees for their role in the negotiations for a new baseball stadium for the Tampa Bay Rays. After the bonuses were discovered, public "blowback" influenced Welch to rescind the money, forcing the employees to return them. Although awarding the bonuses was not in compliance with state law, city attorneys stated that by rescinding them "the city has cured the problem and does not face legal jeopardy."

In September 2024, Florida’s Division of Elections informed Welch's Political Action Committee, Pelican PAC, that it was being closed due to regulatory violations. Among the issues were failing to appoint required officers, and making campaign contributions without disclosing them. “The revocation process is underway,” Ryan C. Ash, the division’s deputy director in the office of external affairs, said at the time. In response, Welch stated "my focus for the last three years has been on my duties as Mayor.”

Many residents criticized the response to the impacts of Hurricane Helene and Hurricane Milton, claiming the storms exposed vulnerabilities in the city's recovery system and planning. Residents in low lying neighborhoods such as Shore Acres were especially frustrated with the pace at which the City collected curbside flood damaged refuse, dubbing their uncollected debris piles "Welch Piles". On October 21st, the City launched a debris collection map to chart progress. Upon release the map did not work, the tracker inaccurately listed which locations had been collected, and the visual tracker for many piles showed "a photo of what appeared to be the same worker posing with peace signs for the camera". “My honest opinion is the mayor of St. Pete has failed us,” said Kevin Batdorf, president of the Shore Acres Civic Association. “They just have not performed adequately. They should have known better. They should have prepared better. They just didn’t.”

Neighbors created t-shirts, stickers, and magnets with the "Welch Pile" moniker, selling them through a variety of outlets. When told about the merchandise, Welch responded “I’d love to see that. I want to get one after we clean up that house.”

== Personal life ==
Welch and his wife, Donna, have two daughters.

Political offices
Preceded by Rick Kriseman	Mayor of St. Petersburg; 2022–present	Incumbent
