= Al Lang =

American politician

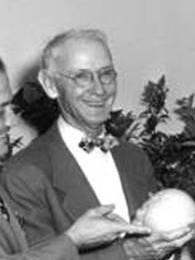
- Lang in 1951

Mayor of St. Petersburg
- In office 1916–1920
- Preceded by: J. G. Bradshaw
- Succeeded by: Noel A. Mitchell

Personal details
- Born: 1870 Pittsburgh, Pennsylvania, U.S.
- Died: February 27, 1960 (age 89) St. Petersburg, Florida, U.S.
- Spouse: Katherine Marie Fagen (m. 1910–1960)

Albert Fielding Lang (1870–1960), better known as Al Lang, was an American businessman and politician who served as the mayor of St. Petersburg, Florida, from 1916 to 1920. Lang was an active mayor who took steps to beautify the city and increase its popularity especially among northerners who would come to Florida in the winter. However, Lang is best known for his work in bringing baseball spring training to the St. Petersburg area.

== Early years ==
Lang was born in 1870 in Pittsburgh, Pennsylvania. During his childhood, Lang was a well known Pittsburgh Pirates fan and associated with the players before and after the games even though he was of school age. Ignoring parental reprimands, Lang often attended games with his boyhood friend, Barney Dreyfuss As a young adult, Lang established a laundry business that became the largest in city. At the time, Pittsburgh was a city that had an economy focused on steel and smelting businesses and was known for its poor air quality. In 1910, at the age of 39, Lang suffered from respiratory ailments and was told by his doctors that his condition was terminal if he stayed in Pittsburgh. Subsequently, Lang sold his laundry business and moved to St. Petersburg. As a result of the move, Lang's health improved and he began to extol the virtues of his new home town. At the same time, Dreyfuss had become a successful baseball executive and in 1913 bought the Pirates. Lang traveled back to Pittsburgh and asked Dreyfuss to consider moving the Pirates to St. Petersburg for spring training, but Dreyfuss was already using Hot Springs, Arkansas, for spring training and did not want to move his team. Dreyfuss also saw no value in traveling to such a small town unfamiliar to most. Convinced that St. Petersburg would make a good spring training site, Lang eventually convinced the St. Louis Browns to make St. Petersburg their spring training home for the 1914 baseball season. Branch Rickey, the Browns' parsimonious general manager, was attracted to the city's financial package that included payment for the team's travel expenses. The following year, Lang convinced the Philadelphia Phillies to make the same move.

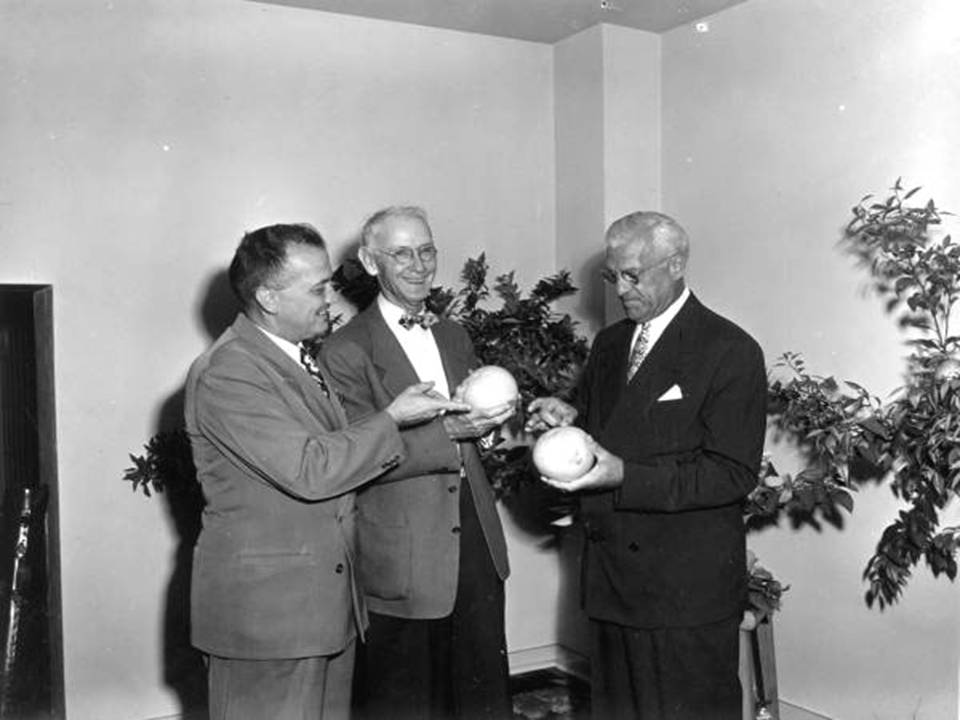
Photo of Pete Norton, Al Lang and Will Harridge at the Florida Governor's March 1951 Baseball Dinner - Tampa, Florida

== Mayor of St. Petersburg ==
In 1916, Lang was elected mayor of St. Petersburg. During his four-year tenure, the city's population doubled as Lang relentlessly marketed the city's clean air, access to the ocean and relaxed lifestyle. As mayor, Lang established an ordinance making all benches in the city a standard size and the same color: green. Lang also extended the paving of streets and the construction of city parks along the waterfront with guaranteed access to the public. Lang took steps to clean up and revitalize the downtown area to include the construction of an open-air post office and the removal of store signs that were intrusive or offensive. During tourist season, Lang was known for greeting every train arriving in the city and personally welcoming the tourists as they disembarked.

== Baseball legacy ==
Following his second term as St. Petersburg mayor, Lang devoted the remainder of his life to facilitating the success of baseball in the state of Florida. At that time, teams were still spread out among several southern states.

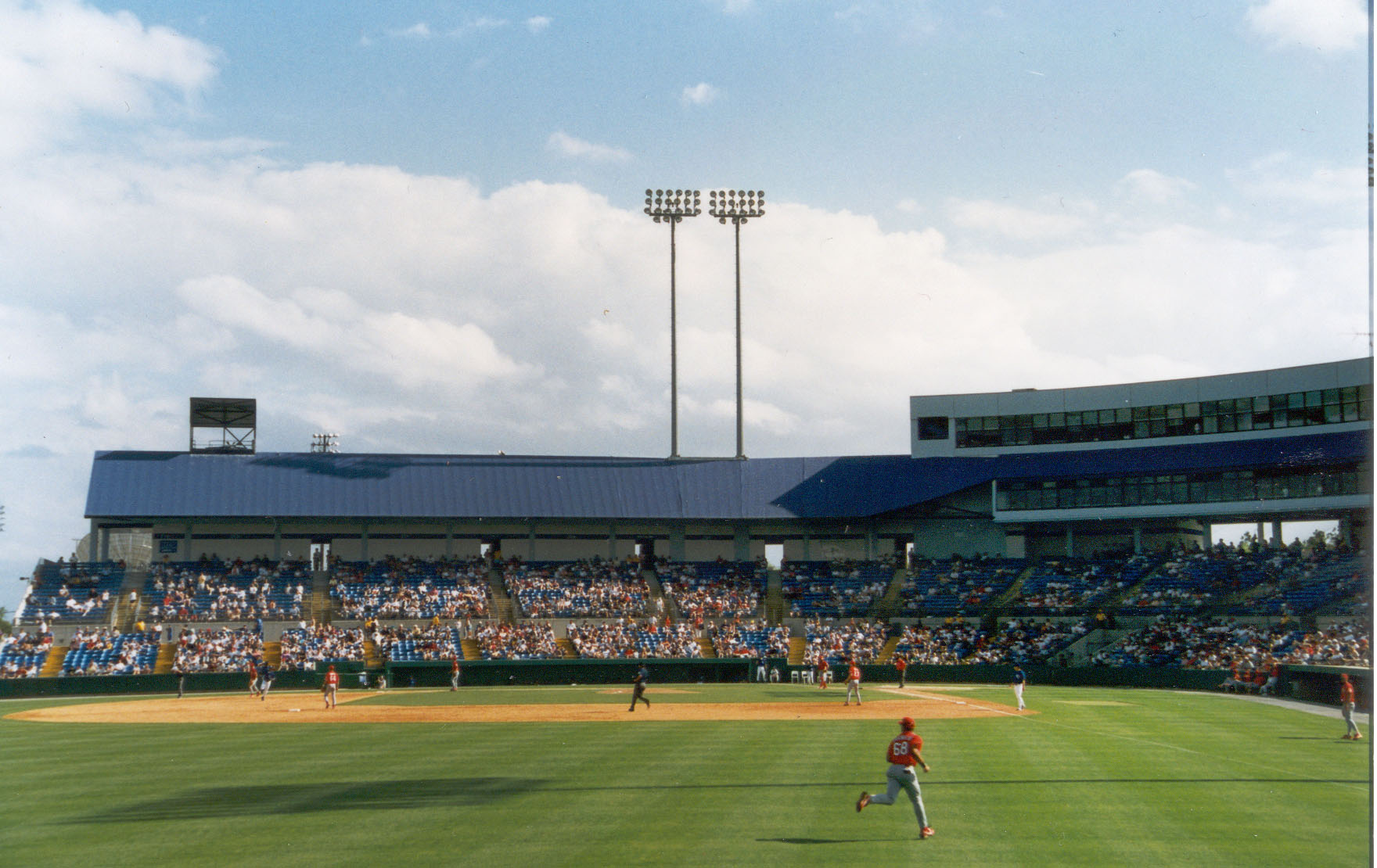
1995 photo of Al Lang Field

"Lang was determined that Florida would become the center of the spring training world. Year after year, he continued proselytizing on behalf of not only St. Petersburg, but Florida in general. He delighted in calling attention to every frost in Georgia or to a freak snow squall that canceled a White Sox game in Shreveport in 1926 ... in the years Al Lang worked to make Florida the center of the spring training world, Florida became just that and nobody played a more central role."

By 1925, nine of the twelve major league baseball teams were playing spring training games in Florida and they formed what was to become known as the Grapefruit League. Of the nine teams, none were as important or as well known as the New York Yankees with their lineup of baseball's greatest players to include Babe Ruth. Along with the Yankees came New York's many newspapers and numerous baseball reporters. The resulting effect of daily dispatches using a “St. Petersburg, Florida” dateline provided the city with immeasurable publicity across the country. In response to Lang's efforts over the years, the city constructed a new baseball park named for him and opened it in 1947 to great fanfare. The new park, called Al Lang Field hosted many major league teams over the ensuing decades to include the New York Giants, the St. Louis Cardinals and the Tampa Bay Rays.

== Death ==
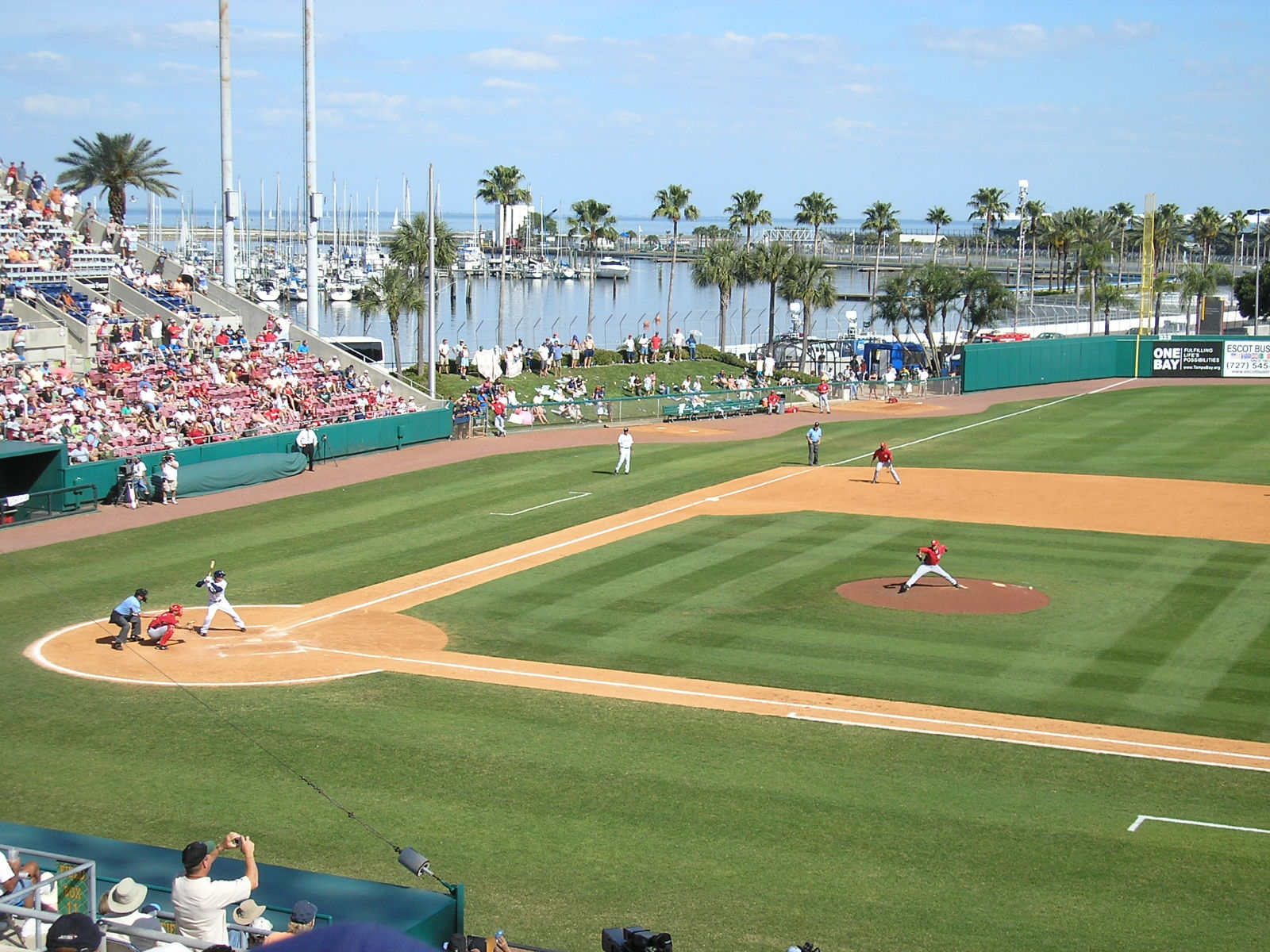
Photo taken of the last spring training pitch at Al Lang field

On February 27, 1960, Lang died at the age of 89. His funeral was attended by thousands to include Stan Musial, Ford Frick and other baseball players and executives. Lang was childless but was devoted to children and made many donations to children's charitable organizations. After his death the bulk of his estate was left to charities that helped children medically and educationally. The baseball field named after Lang continued to host spring training games until March 28, 2008, when the Tampa Bay Rays played their last game at the stadium and then moved to Port Charlotte for the 2009 season.
