= Bob Devin Jones =

American playwright, director, and actor (born 1954)

Bob Devin Jones (born 1954) is an American playwright, director, and actor. Many of his plays deal with civil rights and social justice issues.

== Life ==
Bob Devin Jones was born in 1954 in Los Angeles, California. He was raised in Southern California. He studied acting at Loyola Marymount University and completed graduate work at the American Conservatory Theater in San Francisco, and abroad at the Royal Academy of Dramatic Art in London. After graduating, he traveled the country as an actor and director. Los Angeles remained his home base for most of this time.

In 1991, he started writing plays. He spent eight months in Ashmont working with the Oregon Shakespeare Festival, and then lived in Seattle, Washington for two years. He first visited St. Petersburg in 1997 to direct a Harlem Renaissance rendition of the play Miss Julie. While there, he met his life partner, Jim, and decided to settle in the area.

He has made his living acting, directing, and supervising the Studio@620 as artistic director. He mentors young directors, writers and visual artists in his spare time.

He also runs his own chocolate chip cookie baking company.

== Works ==
Jones has written more than a dozen plays. He started to develop his first play, titled Uncle Bends: a Home-cooked Negro Narrative, in 1991, at the New Works Festival in Los Angeles. In 1995 it was performed for the first time by the Sacramento Theater Company, and has since been performed in Ireland, New York City, the Piccolo Spoleto Festival in Charleston, South Carolina, and several other cities across the United States. The play uses food as a metaphor, satirizing stereotypical African American characters like Uncle Ben and Aunt Jemima. Jones cooks as he acts. It is a commentary on the resiliency of African Americans throughout history, who survived by bending, but not breaking, under adversity. It also deals with the issues of beatings and lynching in the history of the United States.

In 2001, Jones wrote Manhattan Casino, a musical detailing the history of a St. Petersburg music hall that was a center for African American social life and culture for years. Black musicians including Ray Charles, Duke Ellington and Count Basie played there over the years. Jones’ plays have been featured one American Stage and LiveArts Peninsula Foundation.

He has also directed productions around the country, including The Black Nativity, Smokey Joe's Cafe, and Gem of the Ocean.

== Studio@620 ==
He and friend David Ellis founded a community arts space called The Studio@620 in 2004. "When you pass through the doors of The Studio, look to be entertained, educated, and challenged by art, heritage, history, song, literature, theater, moving pictures, and moving bodies through space." said Bob Devin of the studio. The goal of the studio is "to be the creative community gathering place where the answer is always 'yes,' and the community in all its iterations is invited and encouraged to come in." Any person who wants to display their artistry is given a chance at the studio.

Among events that have been held at the venue are a reading by Russian poet Yevgeny Yevtushenko, a night with historian John Hope Franklin, annual Shakespeare productions, and a display of artwork by the Florida Highwaymen. In 2007 and 2008, a writer's series featured Ray Arsenault, Jon Wilson and Peter Meinke, among others.

The studio has been mentioned in the New York Times and won a number of awards from local publications for arts programming and galleries.

== List of Plays ==
- Uncle Bend's: A Home-Cooked Negro Narrative (1993)
- Manhattan Casino (2002)
- Further Down the Road
