= Bob Ulrich (mayor) =

American politician (born 1933)

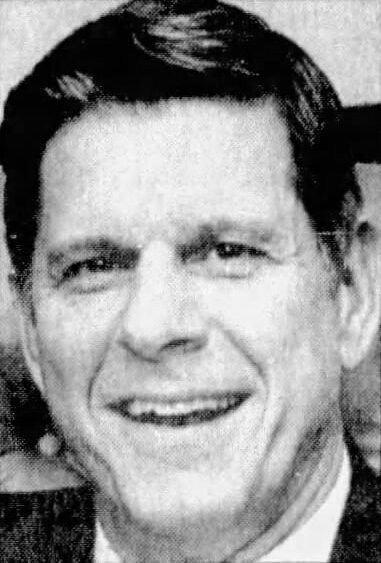
- Ulrich in 1987

Mayor of St. Petersburg
- In office 1987–1991
- Preceded by: Edward L. Cole Jr., MD
- Succeeded by: David J. Fischer

Personal details
- Born: Robert L. Ulrich; September 18, 1933 (age 92) St. Petersburg, Florida, U.S.
- Party: Republican

Robert "Bob" L. Ulrich (born September 18, 1933) is an American attorney and former mayor of St. Petersburg, Florida. He was elected in August 1987.

== Personal life ==
A former pilot in the US Air Force, Ulrich continues to practice law. He is married to Barbara Ann Woodworth and has four adult children.
