= Mayors of St. Petersburg, Florida =

Mayor of St. Petersburg, Florida
- Seal of St. Petersburg, Florida

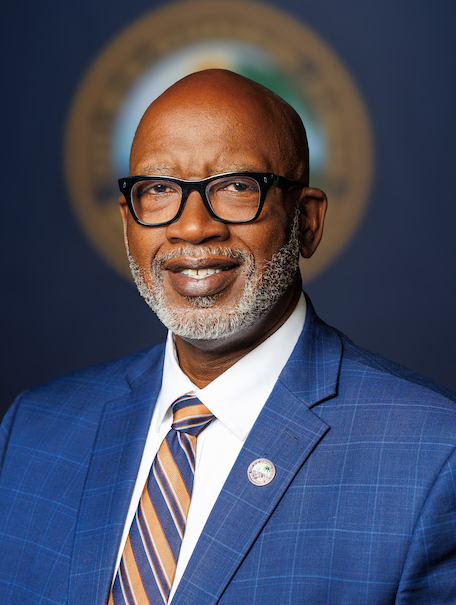
- Incumbent; Ken Welch
- Term length: 4 years
- Inaugural holder: David Moffett
- Website: Official website

There have been 54 mayors of St. Petersburg, Florida. David Moffett was the city's first mayor. The current mayor is Ken Welch, the city's first African American mayor.

Late 19th century mayor J. A. Armistead had an opera house. He allowed Indian mounds on his property to be excavated for research.

Businessman, spearmint gum tycoon, property developer, and promoter Frank F. Purvis served as mayor in the 1920s.

Architect Randolph Wedding was the city's mayor from 1973 until 1975. Corinne Freeman served as the city's first female mayor and governed from 1977 until 1985. Republican Richard M. Baker led the city from 2001 until 2010. He was succeeded by Bill Foster, who served until 2014.

== List of mayors ==
Mayor	Term started	Term ended
David Moffett	1892	1893
Wm. H. Benton	1893	1893
David Murray	1893	1894
Henry W. Hibbs	1894	1896
J. A. Armistead	1896	1899
Edgar Harrison	1899	1900
J. A. Armistead	1900	1901
Edgar Harrison	1901	1902
R.H. Thomas	1902	1903
George Edwards	1903	1904
R. H. Thomas	1904	1906
T. J. Northrup	1906	1908
Dr. Hugh A. Murphy	1908	1910
A. T. Blocker	1910	1912
A. C. Pheil	1912	1913
J. G. Bradshaw	1913	1916
Albert Fielding Lang (Al Lang)	1916	1920
Noel A. Mitchell	1920	1921
Frank F. Pulver	1921	1924
Arthur Norwood	1924	1924
Robert Strange Pearce	1924	1925
C.M Blanc	1925	1926
Robert Strange Pearce	1926	1927
Charles J. Maurer (died January 12, 1941)	1927	1928
John N. Brown	1928	1929
Arthur R. Thompson	1929	1930
J. D. Pearce	1930	1931
H.W. Adams Jr.	1931	1933
Robert G. Blanc	1933	1935
John. S. Smith	1935	1937
Isham P. Byrom	1937	1937
Vernon G. Agee	1937	1939
Ian V. Boyer	1939	1941
Robt. J. McCutcheon, Jr.	1941	1943
George S. Patterson	1943	1947
Bruce B. Blackburn Sr.	1947	1949
Stanley Charles Minshall	1949	1951
Samuel G. Johnson	1951	1957
John D. Burroughs	1957	1959
Edward F. Brantley	1959	1961
Herman W. Goldner	1961	1967
Don Jones	1967	1969
Don L. Spicer	1969	1971
Herman W. Goldner	1971	1973
Randolph Wedding	1973	1975
Charles E. Schuh	1975	1977
Corinne Freeman	1977	1985
Edward L. Cole Jr., MD.	1985	1987
Robert L. Ulrich	1987	1991
David J. Fischer	1991	2001
Richard M. Baker	April 1, 2001	January 2, 2010
Bill Foster	January 2, 2010	January 2, 2014
Richard Kriseman	January 2, 2014	January 6, 2022
Ken Welch	January 6, 2022	
