= Michele Rayner =

American attorney and politician

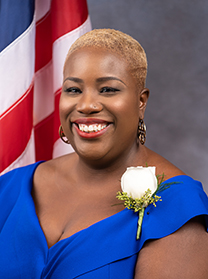

Member of the Florida House of Representatives
- Incumbent
- Assumed office November 3, 2020
- Preceded by: Wengay Newton
- Succeeded by: Michele Rayner (elect)
- Constituency: 70th district (2020–2022); 62nd district (2022–present)

Personal details
- Born: September 25, 1981 (age 45) Clearwater, Florida, U.S.
- Party: Democratic
- Education: Florida State University (BS, MS); Florida Coastal School of Law (JD)
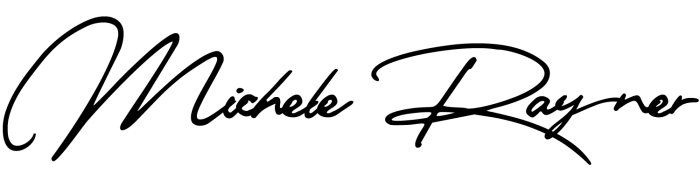
- Signature

Michele Kenyette Rayner (born September 25, 1981) is an American attorney and politician. She has served as a member of the Florida House of Representatives since 2020, representing District 62 in Pinellas and Hillsborough Counties.

== Early life and career ==
Rayner was born and raised in Clearwater, Florida. She attended Florida State University, receiving her B.S. in international affairs and political science in 2003, and M.S. in international affairs in 2006. After graduating from Florida Coastal School of Law in 2011 and being admitted to the Florida Bar, she returned to Clearwater and worked as an assistant public defender in the state's Sixth Judicial Circuit, and then as a lawyer in private practice.

Rayner is the lead counsel of Civil Liberty Law. She was also the local counsel of the NAACP Legal Defense and Educational Fund. She is a member of the Fred G. Minnis Sr. Bar Association and Delta Sigma Theta.

== Florida Legislature ==
In 2020, Rayner ran for the Florida House of Representatives seat vacated by Wengay Newton, who opted to run for the Pinellas County Commission. Rayner raised $116,900 in campaign funds, over double that of her nearest competitor. Rayner garnered 31.3% of the vote against three other candidates in the Democratic primary, with second-place finisher Keisha Bell receiving 26.8%. Rayner was elected without opposition in the general election.

Rayner is the first black lesbian woman elected to Florida's legislature. She was endorsed by Equality Florida, the Florida Education Association, Democratic Progressive Caucus of Florida, U.S. Representative Charlie Crist, and Florida state representative Jennifer Webb. She was not endorsed by the Stonewall Democrats of Pinellas County.

In April 2022, Rayner argued that the effort to repeal the Reedy Creek Improvement Act was emblematic of the "deep selfishness and the deep blind political ambition" of Ron DeSantis, and adding that it is "unconscionable" that he is doing this effort on the "backs of working people."

On April 21, 2022, Rayner attempted to stage a sit-in demonstration to prevent a vote on Florida's congressional district maps. Opponents of the tactic compared her actions to an insurrection. The demonstration was ultimately unsuccessful.

In 2026, she was a recipient of the Torchbearer "Carrying Change" Awards' Illuminator Award.

== Elections ==
2020 Florida's 70th House district primary election
Party	Candidate	Votes	%
Democratic	Michele Rayner	7,998	31.3
Democratic	Keisha Bell	6,858	26.8
Democratic	Michelle Grimsley	5,998	23.4
Democratic	Mark Oliver	4,733	18.5
Total votes		25,587	100%
