= Darryl Rouson =

American politician

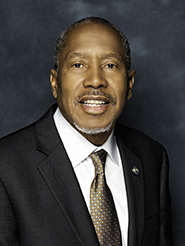

Member of the Florida Senate
- Incumbent
- Assumed office November 8, 2016
- Preceded by: Arthenia Joyner
- Constituency: 19th district (2016–2022); 16th district (2022–present)

Member of the Florida House of Representatives
- In office April 15, 2008 – November 8, 2016
- Preceded by: Frank Peterman
- Succeeded by: Wengay Newton
- Constituency: 55th district (2008–2012); 70th district (2012–2016)

Personal details
- Born: July 20, 1955 (age 71) New Orleans, Louisiana, U.S.
- Party: Democratic (until 1999; 2007–present); Independent (1999–2005); Republican (2005–2007)
- Spouse: Angela Holmes Rouson
- Children: Shkeisha Winston, Danielle Rouson, Giselle Rouson, Evan Holmes, Daniel Rouson, Emanuel Rouson, Jared Rouson, Aaron Rouson
- Education: Xavier University (BA); University of Florida School of Law (JD)
- Profession: Attorney

Darryl Ervin Rouson (born July 20, 1955) is a Democratic member of the Florida Senate who has represented the 16th district (the 19th district until 2022), which includes parts of Pinellas and Hillsborough Counties from downtown St. Petersburg to downtown Tampa, since 2016. He previously served four terms in the Florida House of Representatives from 2008 to 2016.

== Biography ==
Rouson was born in New Orleans, Louisiana, as the son of W. Ervin and Vivian. His father was a guidance counselor at Gibbs Junior College and an administrator at St. Petersburg Junior College. He was also vice president of student affairs Palm Beach Junior College in Lake Worth, Florida. He died in 1979. His mother taught French and English at Sixteenth Street Junior High and Lakewood Senior High. She was a pioneer of integration in Pinellas County. She lived for a time in Minnesota where her leadership extended to many arenas: she was the first African American elected to the School Board for the Burnsville-Egan School District (in the Twin Cities metro), she co-founded the Dakota County Society of Black Women, and she served as interim director at Normandale Community College's women's center. She retired to Washington, D.C.

Rouson came to St. Petersburg at age three and lived in Cromwell Heights. He attended a Bishop Barry High School which later became St. Petersburg Catholic High School. He returned to New Orleans to attend college at Xavier University and graduated in 1977. He received his Juris Doctor degree from the University of Florida Spessard Holland Law Center in 1979. In 1980, he returned to St. Petersburg with a job at Gulfcoast Legal Services. Shortly afterward, he opened his own practice.

He developed an addiction to cocaine that grew at the expense of his practice, his standing in the community, and his marriage. In 1987, he sold his practice and his home on Pinellas Point. He divorced his wife and left St. Petersburg. After some time, he met Reverend George Clements in Chicago. Reverend Clements was the founder of One Church-One Child, an adoption program. Rouson became the recovery revival coordinator for One Church-One Addict, a program that taught churches how to help recovering addicts. Rouson married a second time in 1991. His second wife developed breast cancer and died in 1997. He then returned to St. Petersburg in 1998.

Shortly after arriving in St. Petersburg Rouson experienced a brief period of homelessness. He went on to become active as a leader in the community. He became chairman of the St. Petersburg Area Black Chamber of Commerce, and he served on St. Petersburg's Charter Review Commission. He supported a substance abuse ministry at Mount Zion Progressive Missionary Baptist Church. He became the president of St. Petersburg branch of the NAACP in 2000. Rouson has said that this experience has helped him to understand the plight of the homeless and to endorse making homelessness a protected category under the Florida hate crime statute. On August 16, 2017 Rouson was named Legislator of the year by the Florida Alliance for Assistive Services and Technology.

== Activism and law practice ==
Rouson's activism in the community and his law practice often involve his passions for civil rights and against drug addiction.

In January 2000, Rouson was appointed to the St. Petersburg Charter Review Commission. The Council decided at the same session to award a $50,000 grant to the St. Petersburg Area Black Chamber of Commerce. The chamber had experienced financial difficulties since it was established in 1999. Rouson also became the president of the Chamber later in the month. His predecessor had co-mingled personal funds with that of the Chamber's in order to maintain solvency, and Rouson sought to establish the financial integrity of the Chamber. He saw the Chamber as the NAACP's economic arm and as a partner with the St. Petersburg Area Chamber of Commerce. He set the chamber's goals at bringing more minority-owned businesses to St. Petersburg and attracting the convention of a national company.

In July 2000, as head of the Chamber, Rouson protested the treatment of African-American teenagers at a local mall. In the late 1990s, several Tampa Bay Area malls, including Tyrone Square mall, developed dress codes to deter what they saw as gang activity. One of the concerns they had was with caps worn turned to one side. In July 2000, Tyrone mall's policy generated controversy after the son of a minister at Bethel Community Baptist Church was ejected. The boy's father felt the mall's actions were discriminatory, whereas the mall said it was simply providing for the safety of its patrons. Rouson went to the mall in an effort to "test the policy." He too was asked to leave.

In November 2000, he won an election as president of the St. Petersburg Chapter of the NAACP. He received criticism during the campaign as a member of the Uhuru Movement. He denied the assertion, dismissing it as a scare tactic. He did say that the NAACP should work more closely with the Uhurus and other civic organizations on such matters as economic development. Omali Yeshitela, the group's leader, also denied that Rouson was a member. He did welcome what he perceived as needed change in the NAACP. After the election, Rouson said his goals were to continue to counter the effects of racism, eliminate substance abuse, improve economic development and double youth membership.

That same month, he represented a neighborhood association that was suing a motel on a nuisance complaint. The Fossil Park Neighborhood Association accused the owners of the motel of allowing it to be used as a crack house and providing a place for prostitutes to bring their clients. Complaints to the motel owners and to the police had been unavailing. Rouson said he saw the suit as an opportunity to continue his fight against drug abuse in the area. The suit was settled two years later, with both sides bound by a gag order under the terms of the settlement. Plaintiffs were scheduled to meet with an architect with plans to replace the motel with a three-story, 30-room Best Western.

By early 2003, the NAACP under Rouson's leadership achieved a number of milestones in meeting its goals. Pinellas County created a program to help small businesses owned by minorities. The first African American was appointed to the St. Petersburg Times board of directors. The Pinellas County Sheriff's Office appointed its first black captain. The school board hired more African American subcontractors for the construction of Gibbs High School. His achievements were tempered by some adversity. He declared bankruptcy to erase debts incurred before his return to St. Petersburg. He received a reprimand from the state bar in early 2001. During a criminal trial, he had surreptitiously gone through a report on the opposing counsel's table in the courtroom. He readily admitted he had made a mistake and apologized. Prosecutors said that he could have had access to the material merely by asking.

In October 2003, Rouson condemned the message sent by the Monopoly parody Ghettopoly and joined the president of the Hillsborough NAACP in demanding that the Urban Outfitters in Ybor City remove the game from its shelves. Although the game's creator claimed it was intended to be satirical, Rouson declared, "There's nothing humorous or light about death and destruction that drugs and drug dealing cause in our neighborhoods that one should profit in parody."

In January 2004, Rouson said he would not seek re-election as president of the St. Petersburg NAACP, citing the time the unpaid position took from his law practice and family. He also challenged the community to build on the progress made in civil rights in the private sector and in government. By November, however, no one had stepped forward to replace him and he agreed to stay. In July 2005, he announced that he would be replaced by his assistant, vice-president Trenia Byrd-Cox. He had earlier advocated for the secession of Midtown from St. Petersburg in an effort to emphasize shortcomings in the status of African Americans in Pinellas County. However, he had backed away from the idea after recognizing its divisiveness.

In April 2005, while president of the St. Petersburg NAACP, Rouson stood trial on a charge of misdemeanor trespassing. In June 2004, he had entered into a conflict with the manager of a St. Petersburg tobacconist's shop, the Purple Haze. He claims to have strongly objected to the selling of what he condemned as drug paraphernalia, glass smoking pipes. Although ostensibly sold for use with tobacco, Rouson claimed it was common knowledge they were commonly used to smoke such illicit drugs as marijuana and cocaine, and decried the "legal lie and deception" that allows them to be sold. In court, the manager of the shop said anyone who talks about illegal drugs is asked to leave, and that Rouson had refused to do so. Rouson claimed that he tried to leave, but his way was blocked by two pit bulls. At trial, Rouson claimed he had gone to the store as an act of protest against the sale of what he called "death utensils". One of his witnesses was a Catholic priest who testified about his training in nonviolent civil disobedience. He was found guilty, but the judge withheld adjudication.

== Politics ==
In September 2005, Rouson joined the Republican Party. Though registered with no party affiliation, he had been long regarded as a closet Republican, and had been courted by such Republican leaders as then-Attorney General Charlie Crist, whom he supported for governor. (He had left the Democratic Party in 1999.) In February 2007, Governor Crist appointed Rouson to the Taxation and Budget Reform Commission. The Commission meets every twenty years and is empowered to propose tax related changes to the State Constitution. In July 2007, he considered a run for State House District 55 as a Republican. Despite the district historically voting Democratic, Rouson was optimistic that his ties in Tallahassee and years of activism would give him the ability to win.

He again became a Democrat in 2007 to run in District 55 against two Democrats, City Council member Earnest Williams and activist Charles McKenzie, in the special primary leading up to the special election to replace Frank Peterman. Peterman had been appointed by Governor Crist to lead Florida's Department of Juvenile Justice.

In the special primary, Reverend Charles McKenzie, a coordinator for Rainbow/PUSH and educator, accused Rouson of being unfamiliar with the needs of residents of the southern part of District 55, in Manatee and Sarasota counties. Rouson denied this, saying residents of Newtown and Sarasota had the same problems as people living in Midtown and St. Petersburg. Rouson was endorsed by Peterman, but some Democratic leaders had qualms. They questioned his dedication to Democratic ideals and ties to Republican Mayor Rick Baker and Governor Crist.

A special general election became necessary when a Republican, Calvester Benjamin-Anderson, entered the race as a write-in candidate. This closed the primary to non-Democrats, and the special election was scheduled for April 15, 2008. There had been a prior history between Benjamin-Anderson and Rouson. She had filed a sexual harassment and racial bias suit against Florida Power Corp., but the suit was dismissed by the court. She also filed a complaint against Rouson, alleging that he had charged her an excessive fee. This complaint was dismissed by the State Bar. Rouson defeated Williams and McKenzie in the special primary with 44% of the vote. He went on to defeat Benjamin-Anderson in April 2008, winning 93% of the vote.

While finishing Peterman's term, Rouson was one of three Pinellas representatives to support school vouchers (corporate-tax-credit scholarships), along with Bill Heller and Janet Long. Rouson was supported in the primary election by pro-school voucher group, All Children Matter. They praised his work in the Legislature, and they denied that his efforts as a member of the Florida Taxation and Budget Reform Commission were considerations. However, while on the Commission, he voted to place two amendments on the ballot that would allow religion based schools to receive taxpayer support.

McKenzie again opposed Rouson in the regular primary. He criticized Rouson's support of a proposed amendment to the State Constitution which he said would hurt public education. Rouson said he wanted to reduce taxes and felt the proposed amendment should go to referendum to let the voters decide. McKenzie claimed he looked forward to improving teachers salaries, making changes in FCAT and reworking Florida's system for delivering health care to children. Rouson emphasized the need for reducing property taxes, the need to create more affordable housing and the need to bring more jobs to the district. Rouson won the primary, receiving 65% of the 5,000 votes cast in District 55.

Rouson was one of three Pinellas Democrats endorsed by the St. Petersburg Chamber of Commerce, along with Bill Heller of District 52 and Janet Long of District 51. He was one of three Pinellas candidates for the State House endorsed by Associated Industries of Florida, along with Bill Heller and Peter Nehr. He was recommended in the 2008 general election by the Sarasota Herald Tribune, again against write-in candidate Calvester Benjamin-Anderson. He won with 98% of the vote.

During the 2013 Florida legislative session, he was the primary sponsor of Florida House Bill 49, which prohibits the retail sale of certain smoking devices, such as glass pipes, clay pipes, water pipes, and hookas, which can be used to smoke marijuana. The bill was passed and took effect July 1, 2013. However the bill was altered to allow the sale if it is made clear the devices are for tobacco use only.

Facing term limits in the House, in 2016 he ran for the Florida Senate seat being vacated by term-limited senator Arthenia Joyner. Rouson defeated fellow state representative Ed Narain by 75 votes in the Democratic primary, and won the general election by more than 70 percent of the vote.

In June 2026, Rouson announced that he would be joining the faculty at New College of Florida, under the presidency of former Florida House Speaker Richard Corcoran, a fellow supporter of school voucher legislation.
