= List of criminal justice reform organizations in the United States =

The following is a list of criminal justice reform organizations in the United States arranged by topic.

== General ==
- Alliance for Safety and Justice
- American Civil Liberties Union
- Amnesty International USA
- Anti-Recidivism Coalition
- Center for Court Innovation
- Charles Hamilton Houston Institute for Race and Justice
- Color of Change
- Ella Baker Center for Human Rights
- FWD.us
- Right on Crime
- The Marshall Project
- Southern Center for Human Rights
- Southern Poverty Law Center
- Southeast Prison Advocates
- Realness Project
- Vera Institute of Justice

== Bail reform ==
- The Bronx Freedom Fund

== Death penalty reform ==
- Campaign to End the Death Penalty
- Conservatives Concerned About the Death Penalty
- National Coalition to Abolish the Death Penalty
- Witness to Innocence

== Exoneration ==
- California Innocence Project
- Equal Justice Initiative
- Innocence Project
- Investigating Innocence
- Medill Innocence Project
- Nebraska Innocence Project
- Northern California Innocence Project

== Juvenile justice ==
- Center on Juvenile and Criminal Justice
- National Juvenile Defender Center
- InsideOUT Writers
- Campaign for the Fair Sentencing of Youth

== Prison and sentencing reform ==
- Californians for Safety and Justice
- Coalition for Public Safety
- Critical Resistance
- Dream.org
- Families Against Mandatory Minimums
- Prison Fellowship
- Prison Policy Initiative
- Right On Crime
- The Sentencing Project

Time Done

== Probation and parole reform ==
- Louisiana Parole Project
- REFORM Alliance
- Right on Crime

== School-to-Prison Pipeline ==
- Marshall-Brennan Constitutional Literacy Project
- Street Law

== Sex Offender Registry Reform ==
- National Association for Rational Sex Offense Laws
- Alliance for Constitutional Sex Offense Laws
- Women Against Registry - W.A.R.

== Victim-Centered Justice Innovations ==
- Healing Justice (Victims-Survivors and their Exonerated Offenders)
- I Have the Right to (high school sexual assault)
- JustAlternatives Website - Promising Victim-Centered Practices in Corrections
- Mother's in Charge(Gun Violence)
- No Notoriety(No Notority for Mass Shooting Offenders)
