= Criminal justice reform in the United States =

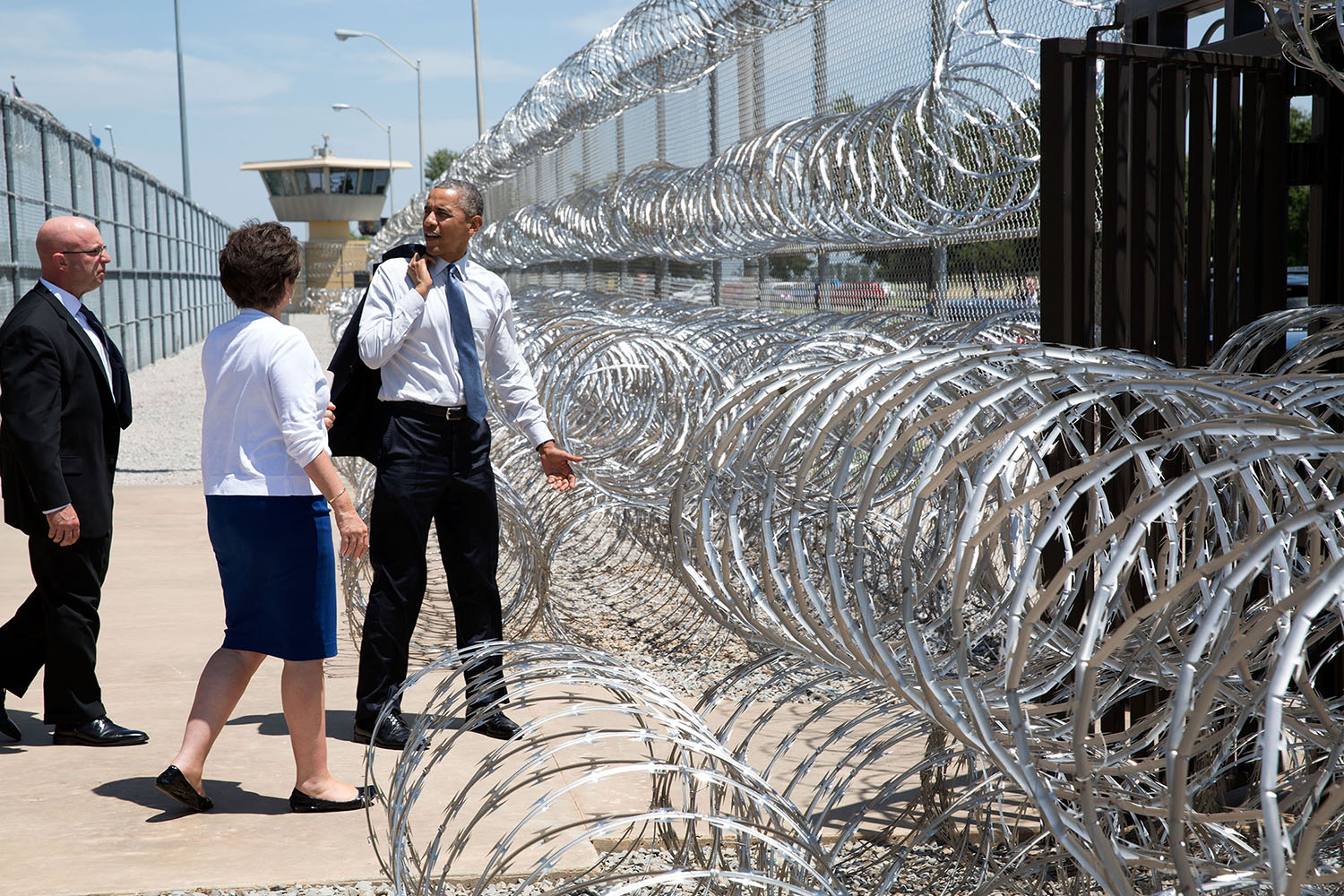

Barack Obama visits FCI El Reno, 2015 as the first American president to visit a prison.

Criminal justice reform has become a major topic of discussion in the United States as concerns routine to grow about fairness, effectiveness, and the log term impact of the system.The U.S is one of the most highly incarcerating countries in the world, and the number of people incarcerated has grown substantially over the past few decades. Data from (Prison Policy Initiative (2024)) show that a big number of those who have been incarcerated are serving time for non-violent offences, which poses questions about the effectiveness of harsh punishment.

Criminal justice reform seeks to address structural issues in criminal justice systems such as racial profiling, police brutality, overcriminalization, mass incarceration, and recidivism. Reforms can take place at any point where the criminal justice system intervenes in citizens' lives, including lawmaking, policing, sentencing and incarceration. Criminal justice reform can also address the collateral consequences of conviction, including disenfranchisement or lack of access to housing or employment, that may restrict the rights of individuals with criminal records.

There are many organizations that advocate to reform the criminal justice system such as the ACLU, the Brennan Center for Justice, Innocence Project, Penal Reform International, The Sentencing Project, the Southern Poverty Law Center and the Vera Institute of Justice. These organizations use legal disputes, impact litigation and advocacy as well as educational events to make the public aware of problems with the criminal justice system and push state and federal governments toward reform.

Beginning about 2013, highly publicised killings of Black people by police (such as the murder of George Floyd) have resulted in popular movements for police reform such as Black Lives Matter, and resulted in some reforms.

== Areas for reform ==
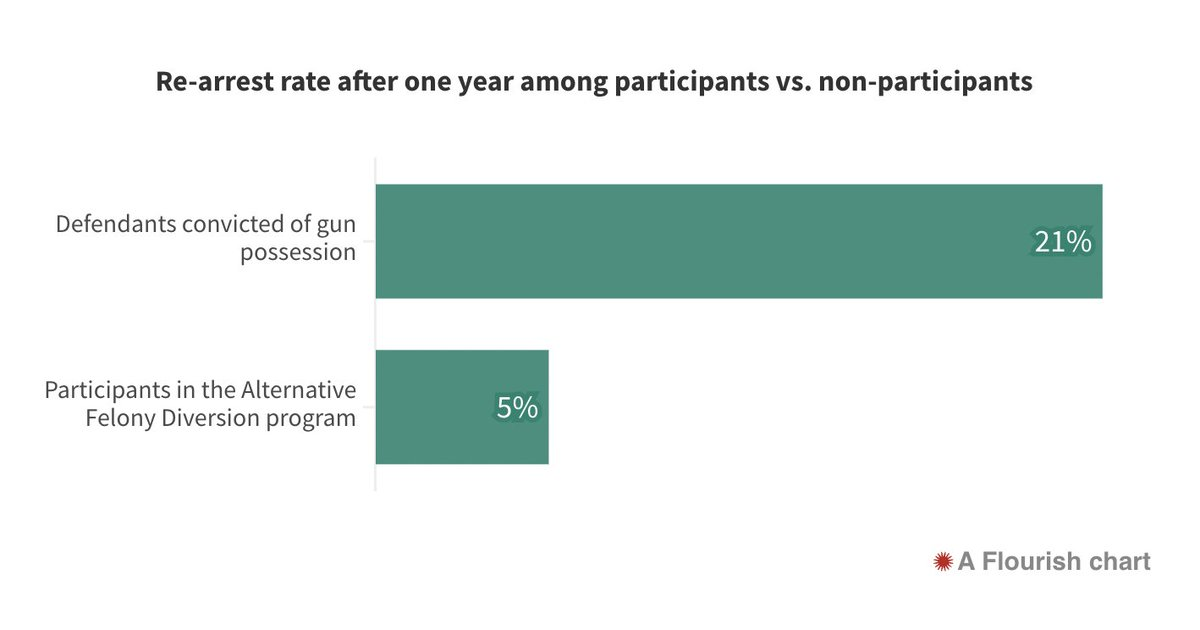
Rearrest rate for Alternative Felony Diversion reform program for illegal possession of firearms implemented by Larry Krasner in Philadelphia

=== Sentencing ===
Sentencing laws within the U.S. criminal justice system are criticized for being both draconian and racially discriminatory, contributing to the growing and excessive prison population known as mass incarceration. Sentencing reform can reduce lengthy penalties for violent and nonviolent crimes, make it more difficult to incarcerate people for minor offenses, increase parole grants, and even expedite the release of eligible insiders, all of which reduce prison population.

==== Discriminatory sentencing ====
In 2016, according to the Sentencing Project's Fact Sheet on Trends in U.S. Corrections, 2.1 million individuals were in America's prisons or jails. This reflects a 500% increase since the mid-1980s, which has come to be known as mass incarceration. Those in support of criminal justice reform perceive the issue to be an increase in surveillance and the use of draconian sentencing laws, especially within communities of color. While some researches claim that racial sentencing disparities are a reflection of differences in criminal activity, crime seriousness, and recidivism between different communities, other researchers believe that racial minorities are punished more harshly than their white counterparts who commit similar crimes.

Findings from a study done by Cassia C. Spohn, explained in "Thirty Years of Sentencing Reform: The Quest for a Racial Neutral Sentencing Process" indicate that an individual's race and ethnicity play a role in sentencing outcomes.

==== Sentencing regulation ====
Individuals are sentenced more often and for longer with the average sentence in the U.S. being nearly twice as long as Australian and five times as long as German sentences. Truth in Sentencing laws and mandatory minimums are perceived to be two forms of draconian policies that contribute to prison overcrowding.

Truth in sentencing law requires that offenders serve the majority of their sentences before being eligible for release, restricting or eliminating sentencing exceptions such as good-time, earned-time, and parole board release. The majority of truth in sentencing laws require offenders to complete at least 85% of their sentence. Due to the formation of the Violent Offender Incarceration and Truth-in-Sentencing Incentive Grants Program by Congress in 1994, states are given grants if they require violent offenders to serve at least 85% of their sentences.

Mandatory minimums are laws that require judges to sentence an individual to a specified minimum prison sentence for the committed crime. Mandatory minimums have often resulted in unnecessarily harsh sentences for low-level offenders and are believed to contribute to racial disparities in prison. These laws also shift power from judges to prosecutors, who have the ability to use the threat of an extremely long sentence in order to pressure defendants into accepting a plea bargain. Repealing mandatory minimums for certain low-level offenses, such as drug crimes, would return power to judges and allow a more flexible approach to sentencing that could help promote alternatives to incarceration.

=== Drug policy ===
Proponents of drug policy reform point to the war on drugs, marijuana law reform, and reducing drug harm as key issues. Advocates for policy change such as the Drug Policy Alliance believe that the war on drugs was and is a policy failure that has led to wasted resources, human potential, and a violation of rights. The mass incarceration of drug users is viewed as a waste of taxpayer money by drug reform advocates. The United States spends over $51 million yearly on the war on drugs.

Organizations that focus on reform such as the Sentencing Project and Campaign Zero also claim that the likelihood of imprisonment for drug related charges is racially disparate. In her book The New Jim Crow: Mass Incarceration in the Age of Colorblindness, Michelle Alexander originates the claim that the war on drugs is a new form of systematic oppression and social control that resembles Jim Crow laws that enforced racial segregation. The enactment of the war on drugs in the 1980s is primarily responsible for the dramatic rise in incarceration rates in the U.S. In the 1980s, 40,900 individuals were incarcerated due to drug offenses, and by 2015 there were 469,545. In 2016 1,572,579 individuals were arrested for drug law violations (84% of which were due to possession). Of this number, 643,249 were arrested due to marijuana violations (89% of which were due to possession). Approximately half of the individuals currently incarcerated in federal prisons are there due to a drug offense. Half of the individuals in federal prison are there due to a drug offense. Compared to 1980, there are ten times as many people in state prisons for drug offenses.

The focus of the war on drugs is cited as being misguided for stigmatizing drug users. Drug use is framed as a criminal rather than addiction and health issue. The Drug Policy Alliance points to countries that focus on the reduction of drug-related harms such as overdose, addiction, and disease as metrics for drug policy success. Portugal is often cited as extremely successful for their drug policies since decriminalizing low-level drug possession in 2001 and shifting towards a health-based approach to drug use. Since doing so Portugal has seen a decrease in violent crime, addiction, and the transmission of diseases such as HIV/AIDS and hepatitis C.

=== Policing ===
Policing reform typically focuses on police brutality and the use of dangerous force against minority individuals. Police brutality refers to the "use of excessive physical force or verbal assault and psychological intimidation" by law enforcement against individuals.

According to the Washington Post database on police shootings, 963 individuals shot and killed by in 2016 and 995 killed in 2015. According to Mapping Police Violence, police killed 1,124 individuals in 2020. The distribution of these killings varies widely by state with the majority of incidences occurring in states such as California, Texas, Florida, and Arizona and the least in Rhode Island, Vermont and North Dakota. While the distribution of killings by state within the U.S. is not even, overall more individuals die due to police shootings and other acts of deadly force than in any other Western, developed nation. Additionally, there are racial disparities within statistics of police killings. 30% of the Black victims were unarmed, compared to 21% of White Victims that were.

==== Police brutality ====
People in favor of criminal justice reform point to recurring examples of discriminatory violence towards individuals such as the Watts Riots of 1965, the beating of Rodney King in 1991, and the death of Amadou Diallo in the 1990s.

Theories from various fields including sociology and psychology have attempted to explain the phenomena of police brutality. Sociological theories of brutality focus on the way in which interactions between police and individuals are influenced by the status of the individual. This means that differences race, gender, and socioeconomic status result in disparate treatment by law enforcement. Additionally, "situational factors" such as the character of the neighborhood also affect the interactions. Each of these factors are cues that push officers to make judgements about how to proceed. So, according to this theory minorities are overrepresented in police killings simply due to perceptions of their race. Psychological theories of police brutality emphasizes that different outlooks and personalities result in differing behavior by the police. This follows behavioral psychology in suggesting that differences in gender, socioeconomic status, educational and experiences affect one's responses. Organizational theory suggests that police brutality is a result of the organizational structure of law enforcement. The use of excessive force is seen as a response to disrespecting their authority.

In his book Punishing Race, Michael Tonry of University of Michigan, claims that White individuals and groups typically excuse police brutality due to a deep-seated prejudice towards Blacks. Media representations of Black individuals and disparate sentencing contribute to the idea that Black individuals are inherently more criminal. Research reveals that Black males with features considered Afrocentric such as darker skin tone, broad noses, and full lips, receive longer sentences than their lighter-skinned counterparts with Eurocentric features.

==== Broken windows policing ====
Broken windows policing, or quality of life policing, is based on a criminological theory known as broken windows theory. This theory suggests that repairing broken windows in buildings and other forms of physical disorder within a city indicate whether or not there is crime. When translated to policing tactics, minor offenses are targeted as a way to deter greater, more serious crime. Reformers point to the ways that broken windows policing negatively impacts communities of color through criminalization and excessive force. Additionally, it is typically seen as responsible for over policing and the militarization of neighborhoods. Offenses such as drug possession, "suspicious" activities or mental health crises often lead to the characterization of a neighborhood as disorderly and in need of stronger policing. Opponents of broken windows policing and theory suggest that this leads to the inherent criminalization of poor, minority and homeless individuals. It creates a stigma that reinforces the underlying problems that lead to the perception of crime within the neighborhood. Additionally, those that oppose the theory suggest that these issues are improperly addressed by law enforcement and instead should be treated by social workers or healthcare professionals.

==== Predictive policing ====
Predictive policing is an analytical technique used by law enforcement in order to predict where crime is likely to occur. It involves predicting both the potential time and place of crimes and individuals likely to commit them. It is used as an alternative to full reliance and trust in the "hunches" and instincts of law enforcement that are believed to come with training. Proponents of predictive policing believe that it is a way to minimize bias and discriminatory practices within policing.

Opponents of predictive policing point to the fact that (1) the data used to isolate patterns of criminal behavior uses a privatized algorithm that only companies have access to and (2) its potential to reinforce existing biases against poor and minority communities. Because predictive policing algorithms use existing data to make predictions, it would follow that existing bias within the system is not eliminated but amplified. Additionally, opponents believe that it is a way to "manufacture" crime; it reinforces the idea that crime in an area exists and just needs to be found by law enforcement.

==== Stop and frisk ====
Stop-and-frisk stops refer to "a brief non-intrusive police stop of a suspect" warranted by "reasonable suspicion" that often involve a pat-down of the suspect. Stop-and-frisk policies became a large part of criminal justice reform efforts following NYPD's use of the tactic. NYPD vowed to end its implementation of stop and frisk policies August 12, 2013 when ruled unconstitutional in Floyd v. City of New York. Although this is the case, similar policies are used in other cities throughout the U.S. Stop and frisk has saved thousands of lives according to former New York City mayor Michael Bloomberg, and has been responsible for taking thousands of illegal weapons off the streets of New York. According to Bloomberg Stop and Frisk has reduced the incarceration rate by 30 percent. "People also have a right to walk down the street without being killed or mugged", said Bloomberg, "And for those rights to be protected, we have to give the members of our Police Department the tools they need to do their job..."

Opponents of stop-and-frisk believe that it is unconstitutional, ineffective, and racist. Most cases in which stop and frisk is used are a result of the war on drugs. In line with this, the majority of those targeted are racial minorities, specifically African Americans. A report by the Public Advocate's office indicates that of the 532,911 stops made in 2012 in New York City, 53% of individuals were Black and 31% were Hispanic. Additionally, the New York Civil Liberties Union indicated that only 97,296 stops were made in 2002, or less than a fifth of those made in 2012. Opponents point to the fact that stop-and-frisk is often unproductive and fails to fulfill its aim. Of the 2.3 million instances of police stopping Black males based on reasonable suspicion between 2004 and 2012, only 16,000 resulted in the seizure of illicit goods. In addition to this, Julian V. Roberts states in his article, "Public Opinion, Crime, and Criminal Justice" that research shows not a lot of people are aware of basic laws statistics of crimes.

=== Re-entry ===
Those that believe re-entry programs need reform typically point to recidivism rates within the United States criminal justice system. While those against reform claim that recidivism rates are indicative of inherent criminality amongst certain groups, those in support of reform believe it is indicative of the ineffectiveness of re-entry and parole programs.

Different types of disenfranchisement exist that affect the formerly incarcerated after their release. Advocates of criminal justice reform in the United States often also push for the reform of restrictions on federal aid and societal participation. Federal restrictions that exist include bans on the use of welfare programs and federal financial aid for education. Restrictions on societal participation include felons not being allowed to hold public office, teach or work in child care, or vote. Voting restrictions are known as felony disenfranchisement. This refers to the regulations that prevent those with a felony conviction from voting in local, state, and federal elections on the basis of their conviction. 6.1 million individuals were unable to vote due to felony disenfranchisement in 2016.

Former prisoners are incarcerated multiple times, increasing recidivism rates, because they are unable to follow strict rules and regulations. Advocates of parole reform perceive these regulations as not being focus on community well-being but instead on controlling parolees. A report for Columbia University's Justice lab showed that in the four years since January 1, 2018, New York City's jail population declined by 21%. However, during this time period, the population of individuals incarcerated due to parole violations increased by 15%.

The challenge of finding employment opportunities is another barrier for reintegration. Many employers deny applicants due to criminal records. Other reasons for difficulty finding employment is lack of available support such as personal networks and resources from correction systems. The chance of successful reintegration can come from the community surrounding the newly released individual. Those who return to disadvantaged neighborhoods have a higher chance of recidivism than those who return to communities with rich and affluent resources. Lack of stable housing and resources to combat mental health and drug and alcohol abuse create obstacles for formerly incarcerated to successfully reintegrate.

Former prisoners are incarcerated multiple times, increasing recidivism rates, because of many factors that often do not include real crime. Most often they are re-incarcerated because of strict parole rules and regulations. Advocates of parole reform perceive these regulations as not being focus on community well-being but instead on controlling parolees. A report for Columbia University's Justice lab showed that in the four years since January 1, 2018, New York City's jail population declined by 21%. However, during this time period, the population of individuals incarcerated due to parole violations increased by 15%.

There are many forms of successful re-entry. Government intervention such as implementing "wrap-around" services are proven to help income and boost employment. Comprehensive social services that offer independent housing and jobs alongside counseling and rehabilitation help formerly incarcerated reintegrate. Restorative justice approaches can also be effective in reducing recidivism: Programs that engage repeat offenders in community justice, such as group affiliations and mentorship, help divert participants from the prison system.

The Second Chance Act was passed with bipartisan support in an effort to reduce recidivism rates and improve outcomes for individuals following their released from juvenile facilities, jails and prisons. Second Chance Grant Programs include those that focus on substance use and mental disorders, mentoring and transitional services for adults, improvement for the outcomes for youth in the juvenile justice system, and technology career training.

The "Ban the Box" Act is a program that has been implemented in 23 states that offers fair chance hiring for the formerly incarcerated by eliminating the requirement of addressing criminal history on employment applications. This act strives to end criminal record discrimination and has improved employment opportunities for formerly incarcerated with employers such as Target, Starbucks, and Home Depot. "Ban the Box" also influences racial discrimination as employers began to guess who has criminal records, and individuals mostly targeted by these assumptions are Hispanics and Blacks.

Recent legislation aimed at improving the outcomes of those who have come into adverse contact with the criminal justice system has also focused on expanding the eligibility and accessibility of criminal record sealing and expungement, especially among many lower-level felonies and misdemeanors, as well as marijuana-related records or convictions, thereby providing ex-offenders and those convicted of decriminalized acts with greater access to housing and employment opportunities and potentially reducing recidivism.

=== Juvenile justice reform ===
The push for reform within juvenile justice highlights the notion that Black and Latino individuals, especially males, are criminalized prior to adulthood. The juvenile justice system is viewed in the same light as the criminal justice system as a form of social control that incapacitates Black and Latino youth. Criminalization is also thought to occur in other social institutions such as school businesses, the streets and community centers. The juvenile justice system itself is also often criticized by reformers for perpetuating the notion that non-criminal individuals are criminal. The majority of individuals that enter the system have committed non-violent offenses, but still experience the effects of indirect punishment, direct punishment, and criminalization of their violent counterparts. Overall, this criminalization is thought to be harmful due to its impact on the perception and Black and Latino youth have of themselves and their capability to be successful within society.

Many also believe that the juvenile justice system is a part of the school-to-prison pipeline which funnels individuals from public school to the criminal and juvenile justice systems. Harsher disciplinary rules, which stem from educational inequalities, prevent individuals from re-entering schools following an offense, making it more likely for them to experience social pressures such as law income and unemployment that reform groups perceive to lead to criminal activity. Additionally, in-school arrests contribute to the pipeline. Advocates of reform point to the fact that 70% of students arrested at school are Black, further contributing to the criminalization and mass incarceration of Black individuals.

"There is a growing body of evidence that identifies child maltreatment as a predictor of lifetime anti-social and criminal behavior" (Basto-Pereira, Miranda, Ribeiro, & Maia. (2016)). Whatever the reason for the criminal behavior, there must be countermeasures that are developed to keep people that are more than likely to commit a crime from committing them. After school programs, community involvement in youth, diversionary programs must be in place to keep youth that have a higher risk of committing a crime from continuing their crime involvement. If you do not start something at the beginning, you will never address the cause of the issue.

== Arguments on criminal justice reform ==
Arguments exist for and against criminal justice reform in the United States. While it is more common for those on the left to support reform, some conservative groups and individuals also believe that the system must be reformed. Beginning about 2013, highly publicised killings of Black people by police have resulted in popular movements for police reform such as Black Lives Matter, and resulted in some reforms.

=== Support for reform ===
==== Conservative support for reform ====
There is a push from conservative groups such as Right on Crime to reclaim ground in the debate for criminal justice reform. Although support for reform is typically associated with liberal ideology, conservative criminological views emphasize the role of individual responsibility in crime. This parts from the liberal viewpoint that societal pressures contribute to crime in society.

Conservative responses to crime emphasize holding prisoners accountable. They also strongly believe in the concept of victim reconciliation, or restorative justice. Restorative justice focuses on mediation between a victim and offender in order to satisfy both parties. Furthermore, they believe that victim engagement benefits victims and offenders because a large part of rehabilitation is the recognition of the impact of their criminal acts.

The conservative case for criminal justice reform is based on a moral belief in the need to help offenders turn their lives around, but also necessary for public safety. The conservative belief is that high incarceration rates reflect an expansion of government power. Fiscal discipline reflects a large portion of conservative support for reform. Those that have been advanced in support of criminal justice reform include that the prison population of the United States costs about $80 billion per year to maintain. The push for reform emphasizes that it is inefficient to continue to spend such a large portion of state and national taxpayer dollars on incarcerating such a large number of individuals. Additionally, conservatives believe that the government should have greater accountability in reducing rates.

Their proposed reforms have been criticized by some who claim the reforms are driven primarily by cost benefit analysis and recidivism, not a concern for justice and human rights, including sociologist Marie Gottschalk, who stated "cost-benefit analysis is one of the principal tools of the neoliberal politics on which the carceral state is founded."

==== Liberal support for reform ====
Liberal reformers believe that since the civil rights era, a form of color-blind racism has developed, reflecting a shift from de jure to de facto racism. Within this, racial minorities, most often African Americans of a low socioeconomic status, "are subject to unequal protection of the laws, excessive surveillance, extreme segregation, and neo-slave labor via incarceration, all in the name of crime control." Beyond tangible punishments there are "invisible punishments" affecting convicted felons and former inmates such as: restrictions on holding public office; occupational bans on professions such as law enforcement, teaching and child care; and bans on welfare or federal assistance for education. Some reformers perceive mass incarceration and these invisible punishments as a form of racialized social control and draw parallels between prison abolition and the abolition of slaves.

The prison abolition movement, typically believed to be on the far left, view prisons as a racist form of neo-slavery. The movement dates back at least to Emma Goldman's 1911 abolitionist essay, Prisons: A Social Crime and Failure. The movement claims that prisons are obsolete, financially motivated, and better replaced by more humane institutions that focus on rehabilitation. The abolition movement believes that prisons should not be reformed but replaced as they are not productive social institutions and instead only serve to incapacitate individuals. Proponents of abolition may support divestment from the prison system through state and federal budget plans that funnel money away from punitive institutions and invest in community-based alternatives to incarceration.

=== Opposition to reform ===
Some people believe that opposition to criminal justice reform typically is expressed by conservatives who do not perceive errors in the criminal justice system. Those that believe this also typically reject the claim from reform activists that the criminal justice system acts in a way that is racially disparate, and do not acknowledge the war on drugs as "the new Jim Crow." Instead, "blue racism," or discrimination against law enforcement is seen as existing. Policing is viewed as a colorblind process that has no consideration for the race of offenders. Right wing media outlets frequently fight the notion of racially disparate policing that groups such as Black Lives Matter and Campaign Zero with the idea that police officers are reacting to compromising situations in a normal and rational way. Crime is cited as the rationale for any police reaction, and "violent criminal attacks are (cited as) the best predictor of whom police might shoot in America" according to those opposed to reform.

== Reform organizations ==
Several non-profits, organizations, and initiatives also focus on criminal justice reform including the ACLU, Campaign Zero, Right on Crime, The Innocence Project, The Sentencing Project, and the Marshall Project. The goals of these organizations is to spread awareness about perceived injustices within the criminal justice system and to promote action against it through social and policy change.

In 2015 a number of reformers, including the ACLU, the Center for American Progress, Families Against Mandatory Minimums, Koch family foundations, the Coalition for Public Safety, and the MacArthur Foundation, announced a bipartisan resolution to reform the criminal justice system in the United States. Their efforts were lauded by President Obama who noted these reforms will improve rehabilitation and workforce opportunities for those who have served their sentences.

Reform organizations led by people with conviction histories and their family members have sprung up across the United States in recent decades. The Formerly Incarcerated, Convicted People & Families Movement (FICPFM), a national network of organizations led by and for people impacted by the justice system and dedicated to ending mass incarceration, was formed in 2011. Its member organizations share the belief that people with first-hand experience of the justice system are uniquely positioned to advocate for alternatives to incarceration and for the restoration of rights to people with criminal records. The role of formerly-incarcerated leaders in promoting transformational criminal justice reform has often gone unrecognized in academic and policy arenas, but FICPFM has contributed to a national movement that's gaining institutional recognition and traction at local, state and national levels.

== Reform in the states ==
A common theme of reform bills in the states aim for reform on sentencing laws, civil asset forfeiture laws, bail reform, "ban the box" policies, and juvenile justice reform.

=== Alabama ===
Reformed the policy of allowing people with a felony drug conviction apply for assistance programs such as food and cash assistance. Alabama reformed this policy to expand the criteria as a case-by-case premise.

=== Alaska ===
In 2016, Alaska chose not to participate in the law that doesn't allow people with a felony drug conviction to apply for programs to assist in their living and family situations. Include in their new policy under Senate Bill 91, someone with a felony drug conviction must follow the court's rehabilitation treatments and remain on good behavior under the assigned parole requirements.

=== Arizona ===
In April 2017, Arizona amended the civil assets forfeiture law allowing agencies of the government to take property from criminal enterprises whether there was a conviction or not.

=== Arkansas ===
Most recently Arkansas passed Act 423 of 2017 to allow offenders who break probation or parole to be housed in a different, more rehabilitative facility for a shorter amount of time instead of overcrowding the prison system. This law also keeps offenders who commit crimes from being intoxicated by drugs or because of their mental health out of prison and jails. Their focus is on reducing the prison population. They agree, bipartisan, to do this by reducing prison sentences and adding reentry programs while keeping it cost-effective.

=== California ===
The recent governor of California proposed to reduce the population of prisons with three new eligibility requirements approved by the public. Proposition 57 included on policy for judge's approval on juvenile offenders being tried as an adult, changing the eligibility requirements for an adult with violent convictions allowing them to be granted parole, and advising the prison system to be more lenient on the "good behavior" rules for those incarcerated to be released early.

=== Colorado ===
Senate Bill 181 was created in 2016 and allows juveniles that were previously sentenced to life without the option of parole to file for a resentencing hearing, in hopes of reducing the prison population.

=== Connecticut ===
In August 2017, the governor passed a reform bill for the criminal justice system of Connecticut. This bill included a bail reform to get rid of cash bail for misdemeanor level and non-violent offenses. It also included a requirement of a criminal conviction before seizing the asset(s) someone put up for bail. The governor also created "Second Chance Society" to reduced the consequences of drug possession and offenders who committed non-violent offenses to apply for parole or get their conviction pardoned.

=== Delaware ===
Delaware amended the "three-strikes" law by allowing more convictions before the offender was sentenced under the law. Under Senate Bill 163 Delaware lowered the sentencing requirement for the "three-strikes" law and is allowing offenders already convicted to be resentenced. In 2016, Delaware also reformed their policy that made people with convicted felonies to pay their fines off before they could vote. SB 242 allows convicted felons to vote without paying off their fines.

=== Florida ===
Florida reformed one of their sentencing policies in 2016. Aggravated assault is no longer a crime that sentences a 10 to 20 or 20 to Life mandatory minimum statue, under SB 228.

=== Georgia ===
Georgia, like Alabama amended their policy for food assistance programs for a case-by-case premise under Senate Bill 367.

=== Hawaii ===
The summer of 2012 the governor enacted two bills to reform the justice system for both juveniles and adults. House Bill 2515 and Senate Bill 2776, which was agreed upon by both parties, were signed to reduce the number of prisoners by reducing recidivism rates and use rehabilitation more than prisons.

=== Idaho ===
In 2005, Idaho created a group of members from the branches of government to contemplate the issues in the criminal justice system and find the most cost effective and safe practices to keep the public safe and reform the system. They have created guidelines to reduce recidivism rates in their state. Idaho, most recently, has revised a policy for posting cash bail bonds for low-level driving offense

=== Illinois ===
Illinois adopted House Bill 1437, in 2016, requiring the Criminal Justice Information Authority to evaluate the reporting practices. It also regulates the requirements for reporting practices such as arrest without charges, most involving racial demographics.

=== Indiana ===
There has been framework to amend sentencing policies that coincide with the offense rather than the standard for everyone. It includes the use of rehabilitation for drug offenders to keep them out prison and tightening the ropes of offenders on probation.

=== Iowa ===
In 2016 Iowa reduced the mandatory minimum sentencing for second degree robbery offenses from seven years to five or six years. The House File 2064 also allows offenders who committed non-violent drug offenses to be released early after serving half their mandatory minimum sentence.

=== Kansas ===
In April 2016, Kansas passed Senate Bill 367 to save money on offenders who are considered "low-risk" by serving their time helping the community while they live at home. Instead, the bill intends that the money is spent rehabilitating the "high-risk" offenders to keep them from entering the criminal justice system again after they are released. SB 367 is also aimed at fixing the juvenile justice system by categorizing them as "low-risk" offenders and keeping them out of the prison systems to lower incarceration rates.

=== Kentucky ===
Kentucky passed House Bill 40 to allow offenders to file to have their low-level conviction removed from their record. This also allows people with their felony records removed to vote.

=== Louisiana ===
Louisiana allowed House Bill 266, a "ban the box" policy that holds up the question "have you ever been convicted of a felony" on employment applications to give a fair chance to those that have. In 2016, they also passed Senate Bill 324, changing the age for juveniles to be considered criminally responsible to 18.

=== Maine ===
This reform is aimed at fixing police misconduct and the policies that impact the public of an indigent nature. In April, the governor enacted a bill that reformed the bail system, waiving fines and fee in certain cases, called LD 1639.

=== Maryland ===
With House Bill 1312, Maryland reversed the mandatory minimum sentence for drug crimes that weren't violent. It also allowed offenders that are incarcerated and can apply for aged and medical parole earlier and allowing the prison system to award more credits to offenders for finishing programs that are educational. Maryland also allowed HB 980, without the governor's permission, to allow offenders in felony parole to vote.

=== Massachusetts ===
In Massachusetts, a person will no longer get their license suspended if they are convicted of a drug offense also getting rid of the fee to get one's license back, under Senate Bill 2021.

=== Michigan ===
The governor signed to enact multiple bills in March 2017. One includes Senate Bill 8, a bill that will reform the recidivism rates by applying supervision practices for offenders on probation or parole to agencies that get state funding. SB 22 is another bill that reforms the rehabilitative services to those in the age range of 18 and 22. Lastly, SB 9 reforms the reentry program to make it an easier transition back to functioning society.

=== Minnesota ===
Minnesota has become more lenient on the sale and possession laws by reducing the imprisonment time for first-degree and second-degree sales and possession charges for drugs including heroin, cocaine, and methamphetamines. With Senate File 3481, Minnesota has increased the amount for a first-degree sale and possession charge from 10 grams to 17. For offenses with violent factors such as firearms, the imprisonment term has increased.

=== Mississippi ===
House Bill 812 was signed by the governor to regulate civil forfeiture reporting made easier for departments in the state.

=== Missouri ===
Missouri also amended their law defining the voting requirements for offenders in the state. The governor also held up the "ban the box" policy.

=== Montana ===
In October 2017, Montana signed into law House Bill 133. This bill reforms the system by reforming sentencing for a wide range of first-time misdemeanors or by eliminating incarceration time. It also got rid of mandatory minimum sentences for felony drug offenses but revised the mandatory minimum statutes for felony sex crimes.

=== Nebraska ===
Nebraska passed three bills reforming the criminal justice system. Legislative Bill 172 which was directed towards sentencing of midlevel felon charges by reducing or getting id of the mandatory minimum sentences. LB 173 was directed towards the "three-strikes" law by reducing the requirements to only violent crimes. Lastly, LB 483 which would reenact a rule from the 1980s. This is the "one-third" rule that forces judges to apply minimum sentences that are a third of the maximum sentence.

=== Nevada ===
Nevada has reformed the policy for voting by allowing convicted felons to vote in Assembly Bill 181. They have reformed the amount of time to file for a petition to seal conviction records in Senate Bill 125 and allowing offenders who are incarcerated to speak with their families to find a job for when they reenter society in Senate Bill 420.

=== New Hampshire ===
Most recently in New Hampshire, they have decriminalized a small amount of marijuana with House Bill 640. Senate Bill 200 reduces the likeliness that you will have served jail time for not being able to afford a fine and its fees.

=== New Jersey ===
New Jersey passed a bill reforming the treatment of offenders while they are incarcerated by only allowing offenders to be housed in solitary confinement for less than 15 consecutive days at a time. S51 also prohibits solitary confinement for those with disabilities, mental illnesses, and the LGBTQ community. If an offender is housed in solitary confinement, S51 requires they are seen by a medical professional every day for their stay.

=== New Mexico ===
The reform for New Mexico has focused mostly on making the sentencing tougher, but there has been a campaign that advocates for reform called New Mexico Safe.

=== New York ===
New York passed a 2017 Criminal Justice Reform Act only approving, so far, reforming the bail determination system, raising the age of juvenile offenders, and providing a speedy trial for all.

=== North Carolina ===
Most recent controversy about North Carolina is the passing of House Bill 142 that prevents the protection of the members in the LGBTQ community. Senate Bill 145 puts a limit on the role of the highway department patrol enforcing federal immigration laws.

=== North Dakota ===
North Dakota has passed two bills reforming the criminal justice system in different ways. One bill, House Bill 1221, reforms the confidential informant use by the police restricting juveniles to be an informant, making sure the informant has spoken with a lawyer and both parties are aware of the safety risks. The other bill, House Bill 1195, reforms the juvenile sentencing for murder. Instead of being sentenced as an adult, if they are tried as an adult, they are sentenced as a juvenile so they won't receive the sentence of life without the option of parole.

=== Ohio ===
Most recently, Ohio has passed Senate Bill 97 to increase the amount of time someone who has committed a crime with a weapon spends in prison by 50%. It also restricts offenders with a violent background and violent criminal history to buy or use a firearm. They have also passed a variation of the "ban the box" policy by requiring employers of the public to not consider the criminal background as the first thing to rule them out.

=== Oklahoma ===
Oklahoma has amended classifications for drug possession charges and property offenses to reflect as misdemeanors under State Question 780. They also approved State Question 781 to use the money funding offenders in the previous state question towards rehabilitation instead. In 2016, Oklahoma also held up the "ban the box" policy.

=== Oregon ===
Most recent efforts from Oregon is a complain, They Report to you, to make the criminal justice system clearer to the average person, focus on the reason an offender commits a crime but also with a prevention and rehabilitative approach.

=== Pennsylvania ===
Reform in Pennsylvania has enacted a Senate Bill 100, Criminal Justice Reform Act that changes laws such as sending offenders who violate parole conditions to a community correction center instead of prison and to sentencing offenders of misdemeanor level offenses to prison.

=== Rhode Island ===
Rhode Island has passed a human trafficking reform this past year (2017) and a Juvenile Reinvestment package.

=== South Carolina ===
The age for criminal responsibility was increased with Senate Bill 916 to age 17.

=== South Dakota ===
South Dakota has eliminated the life without the option of parole for juveniles completely for people under 18 years old when they committed the crime with Senate Bill 140.

=== Tennessee ===
In recent years, many groups have been created to battle the task of reforming the criminal justice system. They all aim to impact the bail system, and juvenile justice. In 2017 a juvenile justice reform bill was passed that makes judges let juveniles know when they can and cannot expunge their record and lowered the age of allowing them to do that to 17.

=== Texas ===
Texas, just like Alabama, Missouri, and Georgia has reformed the voting eligibility requirements for offenders based on their cases. In Texas in 2007 they were seeking to build more prisons at a cost of 2 billion dollars. The legislature enacted criminal justice reforms and by 2010 they closed 4 prisons and are planning on closing more and the crime rate dropped. <Grover, N. (2017). Conservatives For Criminal Justice Reform. The Wall Street Journal, pp a17. >

=== Utah ===
With House Bill 405, Utah also eliminated the life without parole for juveniles under 18 for capital offenses.

=== Vermont ===
In 2016, Vermont granted House Bill 95 and got rid of the discretion for the state to charge juveniles as adults for certain and less serious offenses.

=== Virginia ===
The governor pushed executive orders that allowed about 70,000 people who have completed their sentence, parole included to vote in 2016.

=== Washington ===
Washington has reformed their sentencing structure also while restructuring their discretionary powers for those involved in the criminal justice system. In September 2017, the voting rights of people with felony convictions were reenacted allowing them to vote once their sentence is completed. Another reform Washington is working towards is bail reform.

=== West Virginia ===
Senate Bill 393 was passed in April 2015 to reform the juvenile justice system by keeping the juveniles at home instead of incarcerated.

=== Wisconsin ===
Wisconsin has also recently adopted a form the "ban the box" policy to require the employers of state jobs to hold off on asking about any criminal convictions until the end of the application process in the Wisconsin Act 150. The state has also pursued more options for those who committed low-level nonviolent crimes out of prisons and jails and more resources in the community in Assembly 657. They have also tightened the penalty process for repeat offenders of driving while intoxicated in AB 536 and Senate Bill 455.

=== Wyoming ===
One bill in 2017 aimed at fixing the criminal justice system wasn't passed in the Senate. It was aimed at reforming sentences and reforming the parole and probation violations and the conditions and resentencing.

== See also ==
- Decarceration in the United States – efforts aimed at reducing the number of people held in custody or custodial supervision
- Fair-chance employer – an employer that does not automatically disqualify all job seekers with a criminal background
