= Marc A. Levin =

American attorney

- Occupation: Attorney
- Known for: Right on Crime

Marc A. Levin is an American attorney who serves as Chief Policy Counsel for the Council on Criminal Justice. He was previously director of the Center for Effective Justice and the Right on Crime initiative at the Texas Public Policy Foundation in Austin, Texas. An advocate for conservative criminal justice reform, he co-founded Right on Crime in 2010.

== Biography ==
In 1999, Levin graduated with honors from the University of Texas with a B.A. in Plan II Honors and Government. He was a student columnist for The Daily Texan and in that and other roles was involved in freedom of speech and political controversies as a student. In 2002, Levin received his J.D. with honors from the University of Texas School of Law.

Levin served as a law clerk to Judge Will Garwood on the U.S. Court of Appeals for the Fifth Circuit and Staff Attorney at the Texas Supreme Court.

Levin then joined the Texas Public Policy Foundation. He launched its criminal justice program in 2005 and co-founded the Foundation's "influential" Right on Crime think tank in 2010.

In 2007, Levin was recognized by the Texas House of Representatives with a resolution noting his "indispensable contributions" to state juvenile and criminal justice reforms. Levin was number 25 on Politico's The Politico 50 in 2014.

Mother Jones called Levin "one of the nation's leading advocates of conservative criminal-justice reform."

In 2021, Levin joined the Council on Criminal Justice as their Chief Policy Counsel. In this role he develops policy, educates policymakers, and promotes the conservative viewpoint on criminal justice reform. He also partners with colleague Khalil Cumberbatch on Centering Justice, a collaborative project engaging a diverse range of the nation's top thinkers and doers in an ongoing, ideologically vibrant conversation about criminal justice policy.

Levin speaks frequently to media and has testified multiple times before Congress and state legislatures on criminal justice issues. He has presented in meetings with U.S. presidents, House speakers, and international political leaders in the United Kingdom, Uruguay, and Australia.

Levin serves on the American Legislative Exchange Council Judiciary Task Force, the Aspen Institute Criminal Justice Initiative Advisory Board, the Caruth Police Institute Advisory Board, the Urban Rural Action Board of Directors, the executive committee of the Federalist Society’s Criminal Law & Procedure Practice Group, the Corrections News Editorial Advisory Board, the University of Texas LBJ School’s Prison and Jail Innovation Lab Advisory Committee, and The Marshall Project Advisory Board.
