= 2002 Florida Attorney General election =

- November 5, 2002
- Turnout: 53.06% (Registered voters)
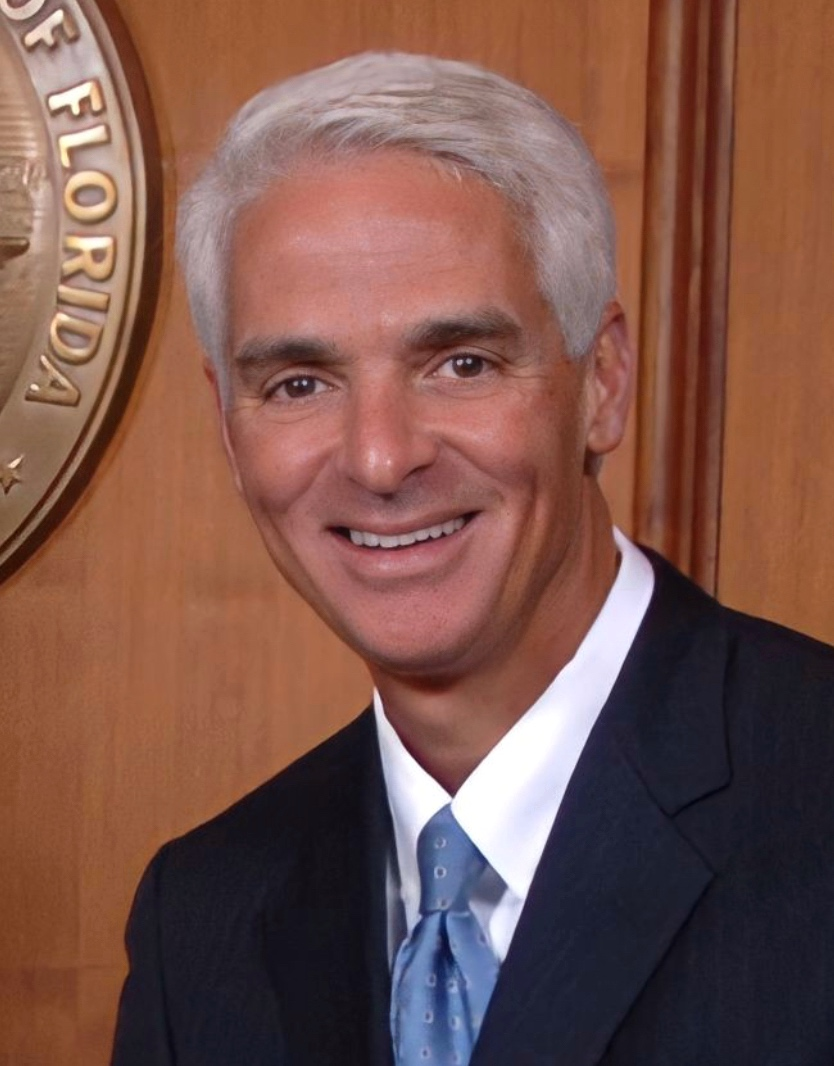

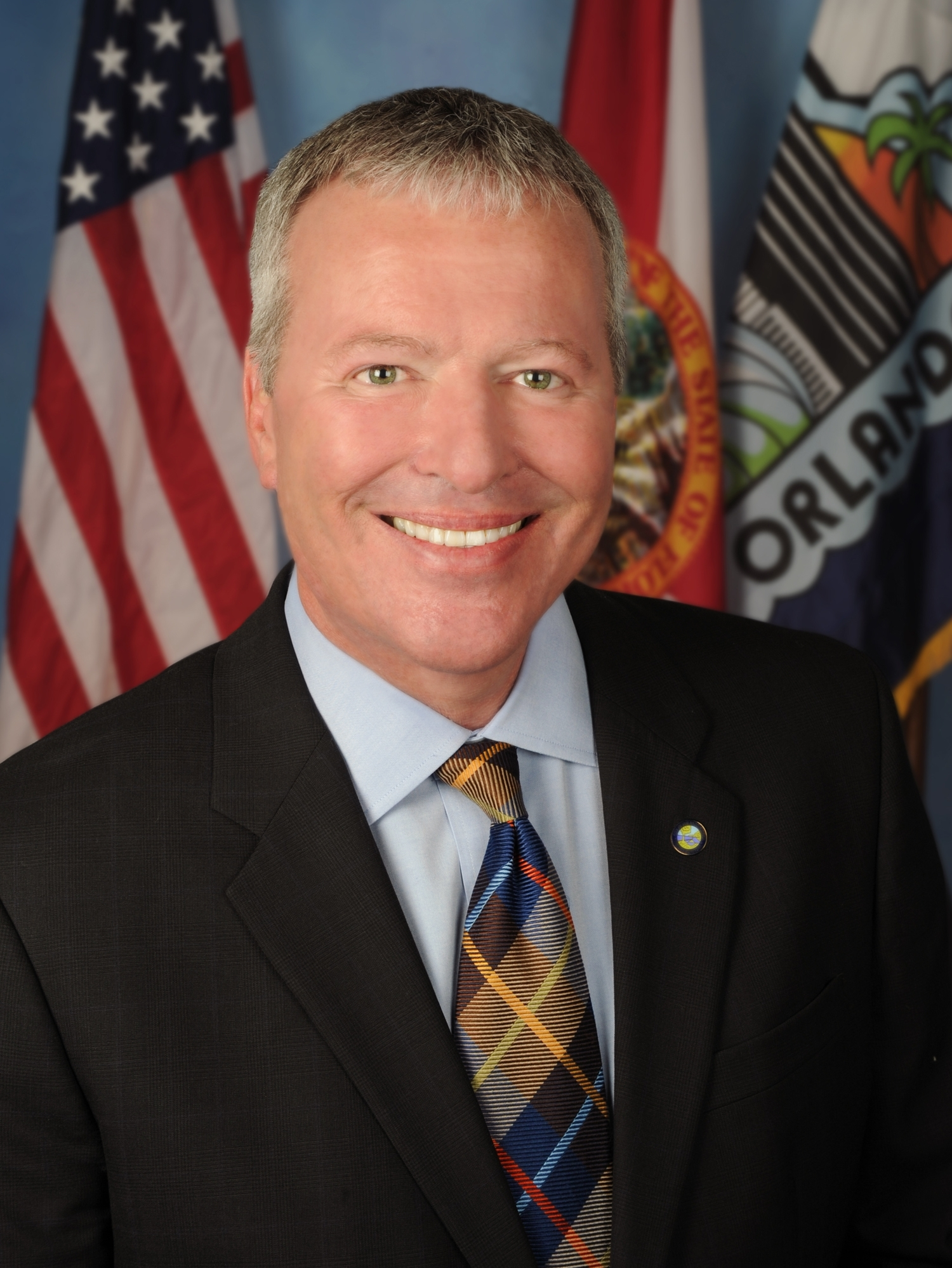
Nominee	Charlie Crist	Buddy Dyer
Party	Republican	Democratic
Popular vote	2,636,616	2,299,149
Percentage	53.4%	46.6%
- County results Crist: 50–60% 60–70% 70–80% Dyer: 50–60% 60–70% 70–80%
Attorney General before election
Richard E. Doran
Republican
Elected Attorney General
Charlie Crist
Republican

The 2002 Florida Attorney General election took place on November 5, 2002, to elect the Florida Attorney General. The election was won by Charlie Crist who took office in January 2003.

== Republican primary ==
=== Candidates ===
- Locke Burt, State Senator
- Charlie Crist, Education Commissioner of Florida
- Tom Warner, State Representative

=== Results ===
Republican primary results
Party	Candidate	Votes	%
Republican	Charlie Crist	484,466	50.11
Republican	Tom Warner	257,049	26.59
Republican	Locke Burt	225,360	23.31
Total votes		966,875	100.00

== Democratic primary ==
=== Candidates ===
- Walt Dartland
- Buddy Dyer, State Senator
- Scott Maddox, Mayor of Tallahassee
- George H. Sheldon, former State Representative and nominee for Education Commissioner of Florida in 2000

=== Results ===
Democratic primary results
Party	Candidate	Votes	%
Democratic	Buddy Dyer	457,704	37.16
Democratic	Scott Maddox	429,651	34.88
Democratic	George H. Sheldon	272,517	22.12
Democratic	Walt Dartland	71,952	5.84
Total votes		1,231,824	100.00

== General election ==
=== Results ===
Florida Attorney General election, 2002
Party	Candidate	Votes	%	±%
Republican	Charlie Crist	2,636,616	53.42%	+12.98%
Democratic	Buddy Dyer	2,299,149	46.58%	−12.98%
Majority		337,467	6.84%	−12.29%
Turnout		4,935,765		
Republican gain from Democratic		Swing		

=== Results by county ===
County	Crist	Dyer	Total
Alachua	27,221	40,802	68,023
Baker	4,135	2,165	6,300
Bay	32,313	15,779	48,092
Bradford	4,612	3,067	7,679
Brevard	110,751	77,586	188,337
Broward	166,191	262,430	428,621
Calhoun	1,843	2,289	4,132
Charlotte	36,048	22,391	58,439
Citrus	28,948	22,668	51,616
Clay	38,246	11,977	50,223
Collier	55,082	25,821	80,903
Columbia	8,891	6,965	15,856
Desoto	4,035	2,964	6,999
Dixie	1,938	1,975	3,913
Duval	143,946	92,712	236,658
Escambia	60,012	30,687	90,699
Flagler	13,265	11,962	25,227
Franklin	1,509	2,185	3,694
Gadsden	3,724	11,402	15,126
Gilchrist	2,648	2,236	4,884
Glades	1,525	1,347	2,872
Gulf	2,671	2,618	5,289
Hamilton	1,293	1,866	3,159
Hardee	2,930	2,240	5,170
Hendry	3,447	2,748	6,195
Hernando	31,136	25,185	56,321
Highlands	18,508	11,093	29,601
Hillsborough	161,939	144,063	306,002
Holmes	3,197	2,197	5,394
Indian River	27,794	14,997	42,791
Jackson	6,793	7,702	14,495
Jefferson	1,994	3,638	5,632
Lafayette	1,248	1,223	2,471
Lake	45,728	32,924	78,652
Lee	104,631	53,272	157,903
Leon	30,076	62,470	92,546
Levy	5,287	5,318	10,605
Liberty	866	1,431	2,297
Madison	2,322	3,394	5,716
Manatee	56,925	42,775	99,700
Marion	53,378	39,960	93,338
Martin	30,750	21,222	51,972
Miami-Dade	236,013	223,481	459,494
Monroe	12,772	11,921	24,693
Nassau	14,779	5,961	20,740
Okaloosa	43,515	11,986	55,501
Okeechobee	4,036	4,222	8,258
Orange	111,948	122,593	234,541
Osceola	24,310	22,449	46,759
Palm Beach	145,086	218,564	363,650
Pasco	70,537	55,652	126,189
Pinellas	182,607	145,380	327,987
Polk	78,020	62,219	140,239
Putnam	11,929	9,934	21,863
Santa Rosa	33,093	9,852	42,945
Sarasota	71,874	53,197	125,071
Seminole	64,594	52,267	116,861
St. Johns	38,637	16,111	54,748
St. Lucie	33,512	32,158	65,670
Sumter	13,623	8,267	21,890
Suwannee	6,097	4,743	10,840
Taylor	2,715	3,099	5,814
Union	1,891	1,444	3,335
Volusia	78,077	76,993	155,070
Wakulla	3,270	5,032	8,302
Walton	10,033	5,050	15,083
Washington	3,852	2,828	6,680
Total	2,636,616	2,299,149	4,935,765
