= 2000 Florida Education Commissioner special election =

- November 7, 2000
- Turnout: 70%
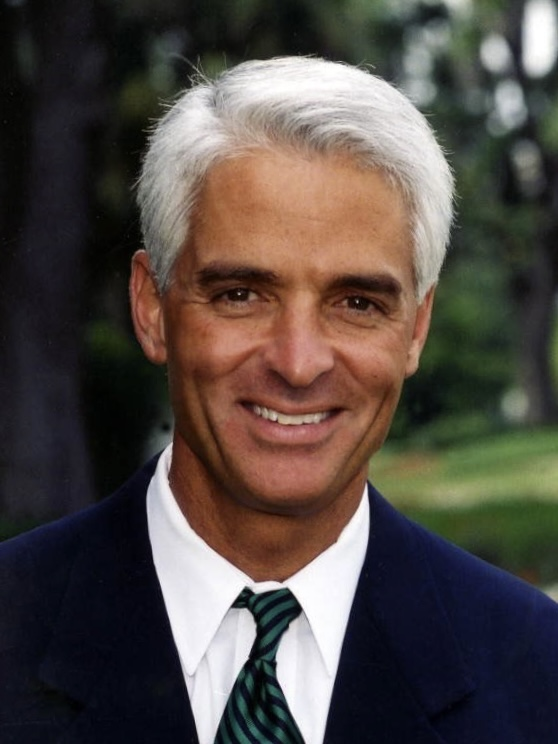

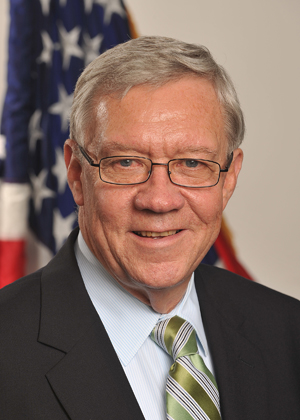
Nominee	Charlie Crist	George Sheldon
Party	Republican	Democratic
Popular vote	2,979,297	2,464,557
Percentage	53.7%	44.4%
- Crist: 40–50% 50–60% 60–70% 70–80% 80–90% >90% Sheldon: 50–60% 60–70% 70–80% 80–90% >90% Tie: 40–50% 50% No votes
Education Commissioner before election
Tom Gallagher
Republican
Elected Education Commissioner
Charlie Crist
Republican

The 2000 Florida Education Commissioner special election, triggered by the resignation of Education Commissioner Tom Gallagher, took place on November 7, 2000, to elect the Education Commissioner of Florida for the remainder of Gallagher's term. The election was won by future Governor Charlie Crist, who took office on January 3, 2001. This was the last election held to fill this office, as a 1998 constitutional amendment to the Florida Constitution changed it from a statewide elected office to one appointed by the Governor of Florida.

== Candidates ==
- Charlie Crist (R), former member of the Florida Senate and nominee for the United States Senate in 1998.
- George Sheldon (D), former member of the Florida House of Representatives.

== Results ==
2000 Florida Education Commissioner special election
Party	Candidate	Votes	%
Republican	Charlie Crist	2,979,297	53.72%
Democratic	George Sheldon	2,464,557	44.44%
Independent	Vassilia Gazetas	102,358	1.85%
Total votes		4,935,765	100.00
