= Louisiana Parole Project =

American sentencing reform organization

- Formation: 2016; 10 years ago
- Founders: Andrew Hundley, Robert Lancaster, Keith Nordyke
- Founded at: Baton Rouge, Louisiana
- Type: Nonprofit
- Tax ID no.: EIN: 81-3399508
- Purpose: Justice reform; Probation reform; Parole reform; Prison reform; Compassionate release; Exoneration; Reentry
- Headquarters: 251 Florida St., Suite 400
- Location: Baton Rouge, Louisiana, United States
- Region served: Louisiana
- Methods: Parole petitions; Clemency petitions; Policymaking; Advocacy; Lobbying
- Board of directors: Mary Livers; Robert Lancaster; Don Allison; Nancy Roberts; Keith Nordyke; Wilfred Barry; Jasmine Brown; Michelle Carriere; Meredith Eicher; Ryan Haynie; Vickie Hundley; Honorable Freddie Pitcher, Jr.
- Website: www.paroleproject.org

The Louisiana Parole Project, also known as The Parole Project, is a non-profit organization dedicated to parole, probation, and sentencing reform in the United States. The project advocates through parole and clemency petitions and assists formerly incarcerated people as they reenter society.

== History ==
The Louisiana Parole Project was founded by Andrew Hundley, Robert Lancaster, and Keith Nordyke in 2016. In July 1997, at age fifteen, Hundley was incarcerated at the Louisiana State Penitentiary after being sentenced to life imprisonment for murder. In 2012, after the United States Supreme Court ruled on Miller v. Alabama and held that mandatory sentences of life without the possibility of parole are unconstitutional for juvenile offenders, Hundley became eligible for parole. Nordyke, a law professor at the Louisiana State University (LSU) Paul M. Hebert Law Center, began representing Hundley on his parole application. Hundley was granted parole and released, at which point Nordyke and another LSU law professor, Robert Lancaster, asked Hundley to work with them to start the Louisiana Parole Project.

Almost all of the cases from the LSU law clinic work with the Louisiana Parole Project.

Throughout the reentry process the Louisiana Parole Project assists formerly incarcerated people in obtaining an ID card, signing up for health insurance, learning how to use a cellphone or computer, and obtaining medications.

== See also ==
- List of criminal justice reform organizations in the United States
