= Charlie Crist =

American politician (born 1956)

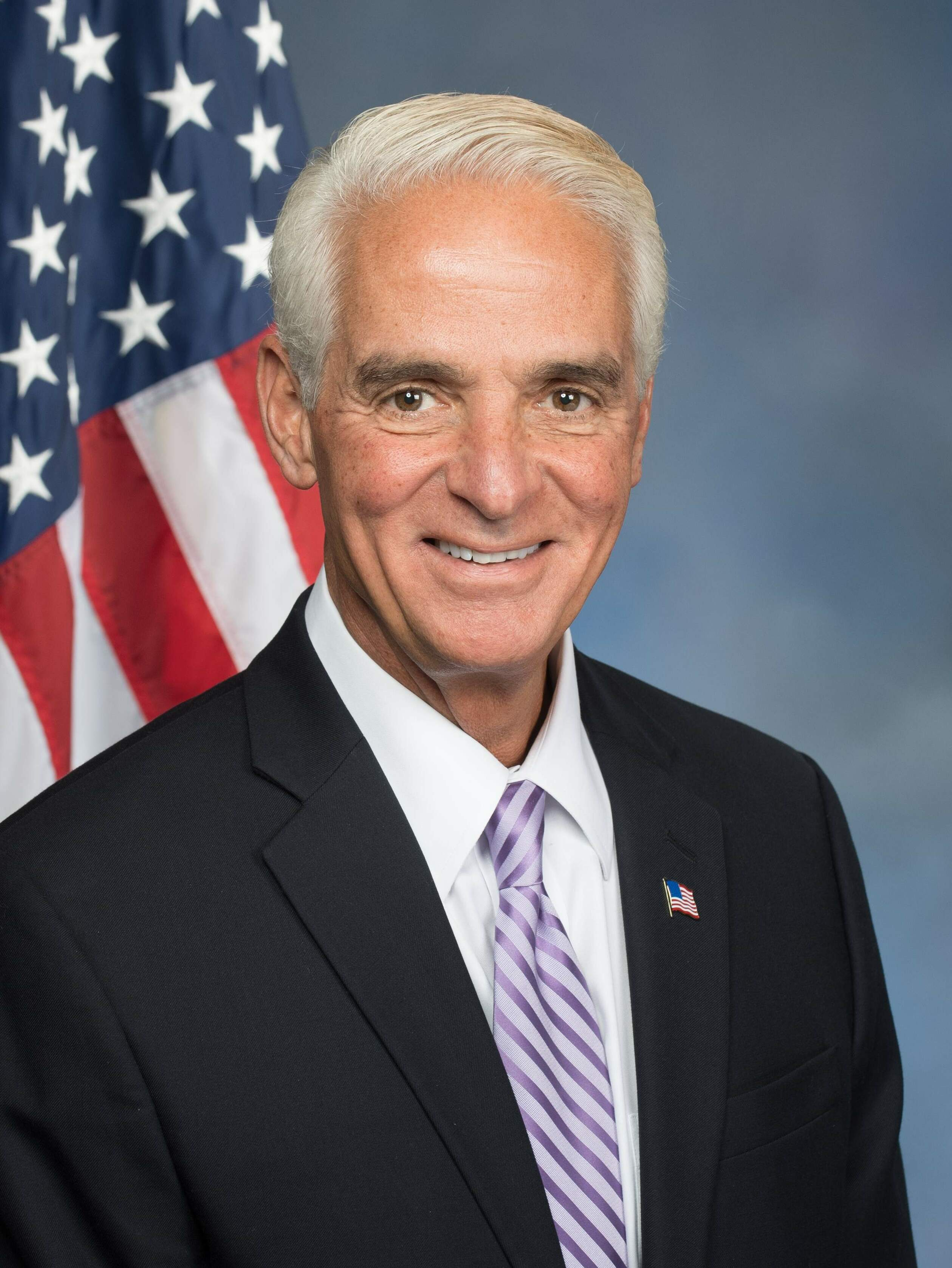
- Official portrait, 2017

Mayor-elect of St. Petersburg
- Assuming office January 2027
- Succeeding: Ken Welch

Member of the U.S. House of Representatives from Florida's 13th district
- In office January 3, 2017 – August 31, 2022
- Preceded by: David Jolly
- Succeeded by: Anna Paulina Luna

44th Governor of Florida
- In office January 2, 2007 – January 4, 2011
- Lieutenant: Jeff Kottkamp
- Preceded by: Jeb Bush
- Succeeded by: Rick Scott

35th Attorney General of Florida
- In office January 7, 2003 – January 2, 2007
- Governor: Jeb Bush
- Preceded by: Richard E. Doran
- Succeeded by: Bill McCollum

Education Commissioner of Florida
- In office January 3, 2001 – January 7, 2003
- Governor: Jeb Bush
- Preceded by: Tom Gallagher
- Succeeded by: Jim Horne

Member of the Florida Senate from the 20th district
- In office November 3, 1992 – November 3, 1998
- Preceded by: Constituency redistricted
- Succeeded by: Jim Sebesta

Personal details
- Born: Charles Joseph Crist Jr. July 24, 1956 (age 70) Altoona, Pennsylvania, U.S.
- Party: Republican (before 2010); Independent (2010–2012); Democratic (2012–present)
- Spouses: Amanda Morrow (m. 1979; div. 1980); Carole Oumano (m. 2008; div. 2017)
- Education: Wake Forest University (attended); Florida State University (BA); Samford University (JD)
- Crist's voice Crist supporting the Women's Health Protection Act. Recorded September 24, 2021

Charles Joseph Crist Jr. (/krɪst/ KRIST; born July 24, 1956) is an American attorney and politician who is the mayor-elect of St. Petersburg, Florida. He previously served as the 44th governor of Florida from 2007 to 2011 and as the U.S. representative for Florida's 13th congressional district from 2017 to 2022. Crist has been a member of the Democratic Party since 2012; he was previously a Republican before becoming an independent in 2010.

Born in Pennsylvania and raised in St. Petersburg, Florida, Crist graduated from Florida State University and Samford University, where he received his Juris Doctor degree. He served in the Florida Senate from 1993 to 1999, vacating his seat to run unsuccessfully against incumbent Bob Graham for the U.S. Senate in 1998. He won a 2000 special election to serve as Florida education commissioner from 2001 to 2003 and a 2002 election to serve as Florida attorney general from 2003 to 2007. He was elected Governor of Florida in 2006 after winning against Democrat Jim Davis.

While he was governor, Crist again ran for the U.S. Senate in 2010. He initially led in polls in the race for the Republican nomination, but was later overtaken by Marco Rubio. In April of that year, he left the Republican Party to run in the general election as an independent, losing to Rubio in a three-way race. He took 30% of the vote to Rubio's 49% and Democratic nominee Kendrick Meek had 20%. Crist's term as governor ended in January 2011.

On December 7, 2012, Crist joined the Democratic Party, having endorsed President Barack Obama for reelection in 2012. On November 1, 2013, he announced that he was running for governor in the 2014 election. Crist lost to Republican governor Rick Scott, his successor, by a 1% margin. In 2016, Crist was elected to Congress from his home district, the St. Petersburg-based 13th, defeating incumbent Republican David Jolly, 52%–48% and becoming the first Democrat to represent this district since 1955. In the 116th and 117th Congress, Crist was the only former governor serving in the House.

Crist was the Democratic nominee in the 2022 Florida gubernatorial election, resigning from the House in August 2022 to focus on his campaign. He was defeated by incumbent Republican governor Ron DeSantis in a landslide.

On June 7, 2023, the Biden administration announced Crist's nomination as U.S. ambassador to the International Civil Aviation Organization, a United Nations agency; his nomination lapsed without action by the U.S. Senate, and expired at the end of the 118th Congress on January 3, 2025. In August 2026, Crist advanced to the final round of that year's mayoral election in St. Petersburg, Florida after receiving the most votes in the primary. He won against Incumbent Mayor Ken Welch to become Mayor-Elect of Saint Petersburg, Florida.

== Early life and education ==
Crist was born in Altoona, Pennsylvania, on July 24, 1956, to Charles Joseph Crist, an American physician of Greek Cypriot and Lebanese descent, and Nancy (née Lee), of Scots-Irish, Swiss, and Welsh descent. His father was a physician who served as board chairman for Pinellas County Schools from 1966 to 1977. His family name is adapted from the original Greek name "Christodoulos". He is the second of four children and has three sisters: Margaret Crist Wood, Elizabeth Crist Hyden, and Catherine Crist Kennedy.

As a child, Crist moved to St. Petersburg, Florida, where he attended Riviera Junior High School and St. Petersburg High School, from which he graduated in 1974. He was the starting quarterback for St. Petersburg's high school football team in 1972 and 1973 before suffering a leg injury in his senior year.

At Wake Forest University, he was a walk-on quarterback with the Demon Deacons during his freshman and sophomore years. The 6-foot (1.8 m), 180-pound (82 kg) quarterback did not play and was mainly tasked with running the scout team in practices. Crist later transferred to Florida State University in Tallahassee, where he was elected vice president of the student body and joined the Pi Kappa Alpha fraternity. He was also FSU's homecoming chief in 1977.

Crist received his undergraduate degree from FSU, followed by his J.D. from Samford University Cumberland School of Law.

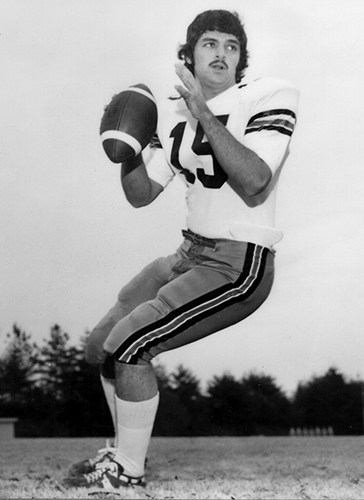
Crist played quarterback for the Wake Forest football team during the 1974 and 1975 seasons.

== Early career ==
After graduating from Cumberland School of Law in 1981, and passing the bar on his third attempt, Crist was hired as general counsel to Minor League Baseball, which was headquartered in St. Petersburg. Drawn to politics, Crist was a candidate for public office for the first time in 1986, in the Republican primary for a state Senate seat in Pinellas County. After losing in a runoff, Crist joined his brother-in-law in private practice in St. Petersburg, but soon returned to politics as an aide on the successful 1988 United States Senate campaign of Connie Mack III, whom he has since described as his political mentor.

== Florida Senate ==
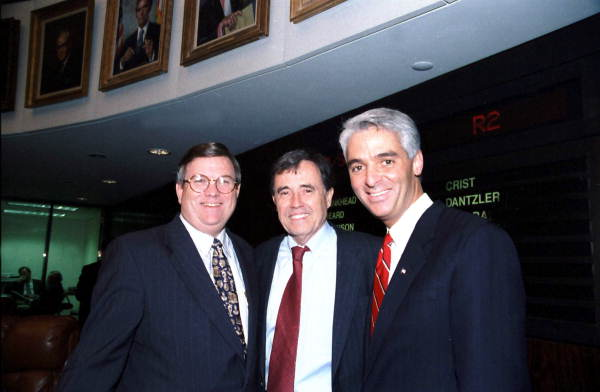
Crist as a Florida state senator

In 1992, Crist was elected to a two-year term to the Florida Senate from the 20th District, which encompassed parts of St. Petersburg and South Tampa. After winning the Republican primary over State Representative Jeff Huenink, he defeated longtime incumbent Democratic state senator Helen Gordon Davis of Tampa in the general election, 58.3 to 41.7%. Crist was able to unseat Gordon Davis following the 1992 decennial redistricting process, which significantly reconfigured the districts in the Tampa Bay area. His victory was credited with helping to end the Democratic Party's 128-year control of the Florida Senate, as the Republicans netted three seats in 1992, resulting in a 20–20 tie between the parties.

Crist was known as a law-and-order senator, sponsoring legislation requiring inmates to serve at least 85% of their sentences before becoming eligible for parole. For reintroducing physical labor for inmates, he gained the nickname "chain gang Charlie". He supported teacher salary increases, charter schools, and a specialty license plate for Everglades conservation. With Crist as chairman, the Senate Ethics and Elections Committee investigated actions of then-governor Lawton Chiles amid allegations that Chiles's campaign had made "scare calls" to senior citizens days before the 1994 gubernatorial election. Chiles testified before the committee and admitted that his campaign had made the calls.

In 1994, Crist was reelected to a four-year term in the Senate, defeating Democrat Dana Lynn Maley with 63.3% of the vote.

== U.S. Senate campaign and Florida education commissioner ==
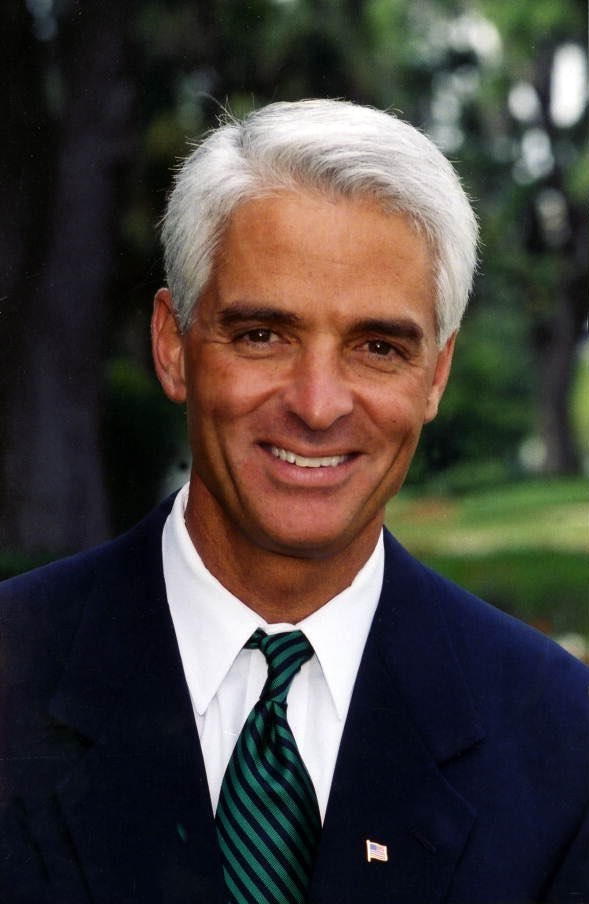
Crist in 2001

Crist gained recognition in 1998 as the Republican challenger to incumbent Democratic U.S. senator Bob Graham. Crist campaigned conservatively on taxation, crime, and the ongoing Clinton–Lewinsky scandal, but agreed with Graham on issues such as healthcare and statehood for Puerto Rico. Crist also campaigned on being younger, more energetic, and more able to address Floridians' needs. He lost to Graham by 26 percentage points, but gained significant name recognition, and was appointed by Governor Jeb Bush to serve as the deputy secretary of the Florida Department of Business and Professional Regulation in 1999 upon the conclusion of his Senate service. He served until 2000, when he ran for Florida education commissioner in a November special election created by the resignation of incumbent commissioner Tom Gallagher. He won by over 500,000 votes and assumed the office in January 2001. Crist would ultimately be the last statewide elected education commissioner, as a 1998 amendment to the Constitution of Florida turned the position into one appointed by the governor of Florida after his departure. Crist left the office after he was elected attorney general in 2002.

== Florida attorney general ==
In 2002, Crist was elected Florida attorney general. His candidacy was supported by the host of America's Most Wanted, John Walsh. Walsh and other supporters cited his work with the Center for Missing and Exploited Children.

Civil rights and consumer groups praised Crist for expanding the attorney general's powers during his time in office. These powers enabled him and future attorneys general to have greater power to prosecute civil rights and fraud cases. Crist also worked to combat email spam, freeze utility rates, end telecom deception, and protect the environment.

== Governor of Florida ==
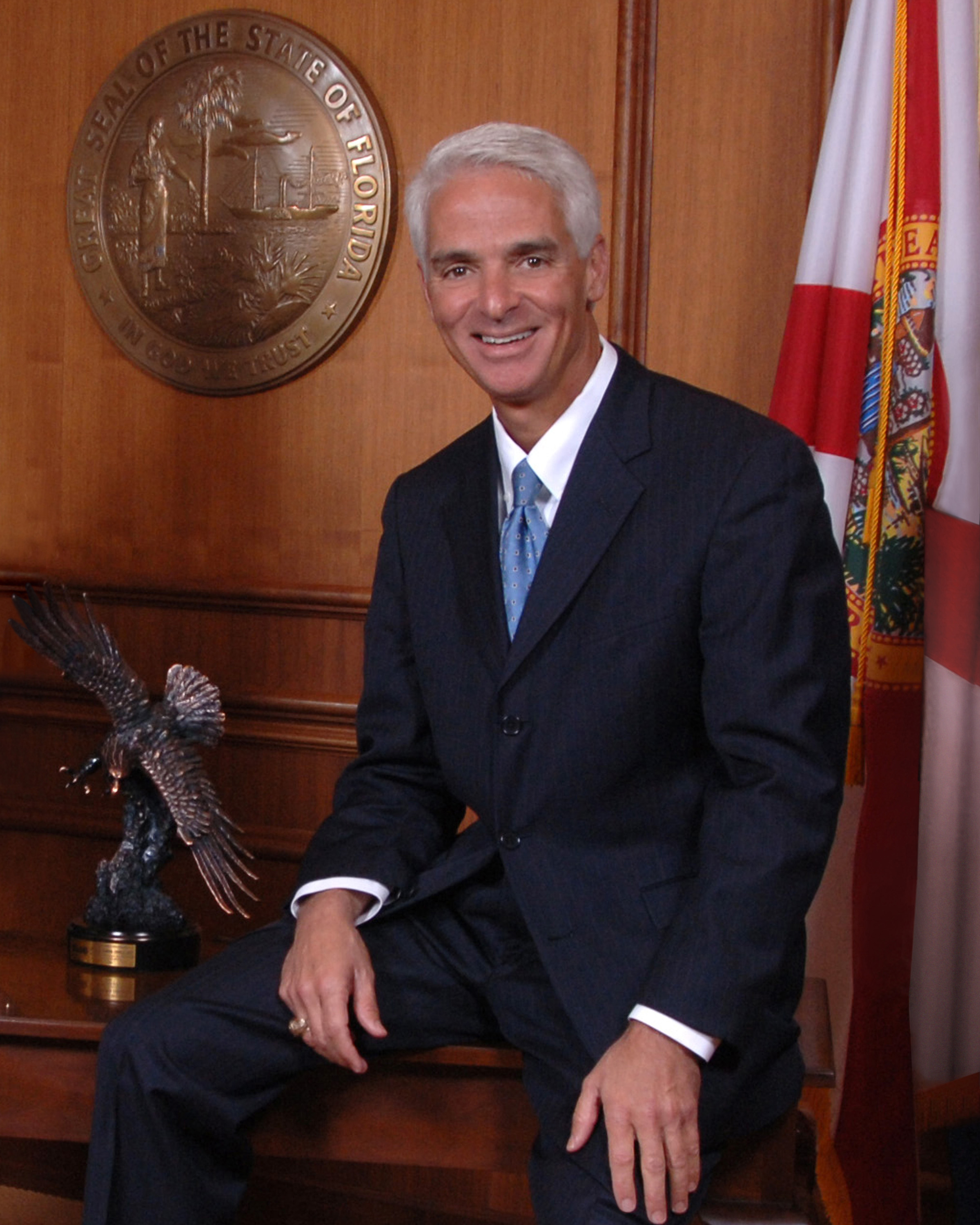
Crist's official portrait as Governor

=== Tenure ===
Crist was elected to the governorship of Florida in the 2006 election, defeating Democrat Jim Davis 52% to 45%. In his inaugural pledge to the people of Florida, he promised to lower taxes, improve the state education system, reduce crime, lower drug costs, expand access to health insurance, assist senior citizens, and protect the environment. However, his promise to lower taxes would prove to be difficult to keep during the Great Recession, and he eventually relented in 2009 after being sent a budget by the Florida legislature which included a 2.2 billion dollar raise in taxes and fees. He also had a mixed record on environmental issues.

Nonetheless, Crist remained widely popular with Floridians during his term, and in a June 2007 Quinnipiac University polling survey, Crist had a 70 percent approval rating among Floridians. An April 2009 poll showed him with a 68 percent approval rating among Republicans and independents and a 66 percent approval rating among Democrats. Crist drew criticism from the right for supporting the Obama administration's economic stimulus plan. In 2010, rather than seek reelection as governor, he left the Republican Party to run for the Senate as an independent. Shortly thereafter, Crist announced that he had moderated his views against LGBT adoption and marriage.

=== Fundraising controversies ===
In February 2006, Crist attended a fundraiser at Mar-a-Lago, hosted by future president Donald Trump, with guests paying $500 to attend. Two of the guests became subjects of controversy. Crist returned $1,000 in campaign contributions to one of those guests as a result.

In 2009, Crist saw the man he had chosen as Florida GOP finance chairman, his former fraternity brother, oil magnate Harry Sargeant III, forced to step down. One of Sargeant's employees, Ala'a al-Ali of the Dominican Republic, was indicted in Los Angeles for organizing $5,000 in illegal campaign contributions to Crist, as well as $50,000 to presidential candidates Hillary Clinton, John McCain and Rudy Giuliani.

== Role in the 2008 presidential election ==
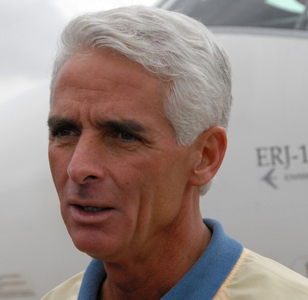
Crist in Brazil, 2007

Senator John McCain endorsed Crist's 2006 campaign for governor, traveling the state to campaign with him. The day before the general election, Crist held a campaign event with McCain in Jacksonville. Later, when the Republican presidential primary debates were held in St. Petersburg, Crist embraced McCain. Former New York City mayor Rudy Giuliani, who had also campaigned for Crist during the gubernatorial election, had sought his endorsement.

In May 2007, Crist signed legislation moving the date of Florida's presidential primary to January 29, 2008, contrary to national political party rules. Crist joined Michigan governor Jennifer Granholm in asking that their states' delegates be seated. Both national conventions ended up seating all delegates, but with only a half vote each for the sanctioned states.

On January 26, 2008, Crist endorsed McCain in the Republican primary. McCain won the Florida primary by five percentage points.

On October 28, 2008, Crist extended early voting hours of operation and declared that a "state of emergency exists", due to record voter turnout and resultant hours-long waits at locations throughout the state.

On November 12–14, 2008, Crist hosted the Republican Governors Association (RGA) annual meeting in Miami. Held the week after the Democratic Party victories in the 2008 election, there was speculation about the meeting's tone. Then Alaska governor Sarah Palin, the defeated 2008 Republican vice presidential nominee, was a featured participant and speaker.

Crist's speech at the RGA conference, "Listen to the Voters and Serve", included his sentiments on how the GOP should evolve:

This party can no longer hope to reach Hispanics, African Americans and other minority groups – we need to just do it. Embracing cultures and lifestyles will make us a better party and better leaders. This desire for inclusiveness is near and dear to my heart ... Last week, the American people made a choice and this week, if we choose to call ourselves leaders, if we truly endeavor to serve with a servant's heart for the people who count on us, then we too must work together, listen to one another and learn from the leaders who made the kind of history the American people deserve.

Crist held a joint interview with Governor Mark Sanford of South Carolina in which they discussed the split in the Republican Party over where to direct the party's efforts to gain more voters.

== 2010 U.S. Senate campaign ==
On May 12, 2009, Crist announced that he would not run for reelection as governor in 2010, making him the first Florida governor not to run for reelection since C. Farris Bryant in 1964. Instead, Crist ran for the United States Senate. His two main opponents were former Florida House speaker Marco Rubio, a Republican, and U.S. representative Kendrick Meek, a Democrat.

Crist was initially the front-runner in the Republican primary, but later trailed Rubio in polls.

Crist announced his intent to run as an unaffiliated candidate in the election, while at the same time, according to a press release from his campaign, he remained a registered Republican. Crist officially changed his registration status to "non party affiliated" on May 13, 2010. He did not return campaign contributions made while he was a Republican. Crist lost the general election, receiving 29.7% of the vote to Rubio's 48.9% and Meek's 20.2%.

In April 2011, as part of a settlement of a copyright lawsuit brought by musician David Byrne, Crist apologized for his Senate campaign's use of Byrne's song "Road to Nowhere" without permission.

== Hiatus (2011–2014) ==
In January 2011, Crist joined the Tampa office of national personal injury law firm Morgan & Morgan after expressing an interest in returning to the legal field during his final week in office as governor of Florida. Crist worked primarily in the firm's class-action sector as a complex-litigation attorney, serving as a "rainmaker" for the firm. In November 2016, after almost six years with the firm, he was elected to represent Florida's 13th congressional district. In February 2018, Brad Slager of Sunshine State News, cited evidence that Morgan & Morgan was "attempting to purge all evidence" of its relationship with Crist now that he was a "rookie congressman" with "little-to-no power".

In 2013, Crist performed paid consulting work for Coastal Construction, a Miami-based construction firm owned by Crist's longtime friend Tom Murphy, the father of former U.S. representative Patrick Murphy.

Crist has been a part-time guest lecturer at Stetson University College of Law, with the title of Distinguished Professorial Lecturer.

In August 2012, Crist endorsed President Obama in his campaign for reelection over Republican nominee Mitt Romney, saying that the Republican Party "pitched so far to the extreme right on issues important to women, immigrants, seniors and students that they've proven incapable of governing for the people." Crist was a speaker at the 2012 Democratic National Convention in Charlotte, North Carolina, saying, "I didn't leave the Republican Party; it left me."

=== Party switch and The Party's Over ===
On December 7, 2012, Crist announced that he had joined the Democratic Party. In July 2013, Crist began writing a book, with Newsday columnist Ellis Henican, about his political transition. The book, The Party's Over: How the Extreme Right Hijacked the GOP and I Became a Democrat, was released in February 2014. In the book, Crist said that his career in the Republican Party was destroyed by a hug between him and Obama at a Fort Myers town hall on February 10, 2009. "It was the kind of hug I'd exchanged with thousands and thousands of Floridians over the years", Crist wrote. "I didn't think a thing about it as it was happening." But it "ended my viable life as a Republican politician. I would never have a future in my old party again. My bipartisan hopes and dreams, I would discover soon enough to my shock and disappointment, were vastly overstated and hopelessly out of date."

In May 2014, Crist told Fusion's Jorge Ramos that he had left the Republican Party because of its racial attitudes. "I couldn't be consistent with myself and my core beliefs, and stay with a party that was so unfriendly toward the African-American president—I'll just go there", Crist said. "I was a Republican and I saw the activists and what they were doing. It was intolerable to me." The Washington Post's Chris Cillizza rejected this claim, citing Tampa Bay Times political editor Adam Smith as saying that Crist "was happy as a Republican when the polls showed him leading Marco Rubio by 20 points." Cilizza wrote that Crist's party switch "epitomized for many within the Republican base that Crist lacked any core principles or beliefs and, instead, simply went with whatever was popular at the moment."

In a review in The New Republic, Isaac Chotiner called The Party's Over "a dishonest and boring memoir" by "a man with no convictions". Writing in Rolling Stone magazine in 2014, Jeb Lund described Crist as "a Republican conveniently converted to Democrat", adding, "what made Crist dynamic as a Republican ... was a vaguely populist nose-thumbing at Republican orthodoxy", and that "Charlie Crist is a Democrat only if you are a Republican."

In the spring of 2015, there was speculation that Crist would seek the Democratic nomination for the 2016 United States Senate election in Florida. This would have been his third run for the seat after his losses in 1998 and 2010. In March 2015, Crist said he would not seek the nomination. In the same month he endorsed U.S. congressman Patrick Murphy's Senate candidacy.

== 2014 gubernatorial election ==
On November 1, 2013, Crist filed to run for governor as a Democrat. He won the Democratic nomination over state senator Nan Rich, but was defeated in the general election by Republican incumbent Rick Scott 48% to 47% in the closest gubernatorial election in 2014. Crist holds the rare distinction of losing a statewide general election in Florida as a Republican, a Democrat and an Independent.

== U.S. House of Representatives ==
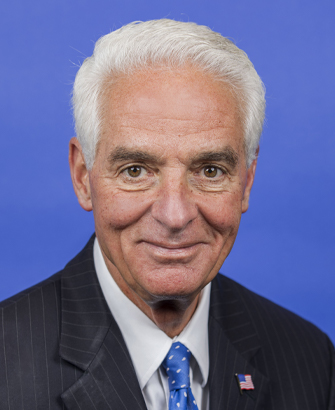
Crist as a member of the U.S. Congress

=== Elections ===
==== 2016 ====
On October 20, 2015, Crist announced that he would seek the Democratic nomination for Florida's 13th congressional district, his home district, in the 2016 U.S. House of Representatives elections. He had previously announced on Twitter that he would not run for political office in 2016. Republican incumbent David Jolly, who succeeded 43-year incumbent Bill Young in a 2014 special election, was vacating the seat to run for the same U.S. Senate that Crist had run for in 1998 and 2010.

However, when Senator Marco Rubio decided to run for re-election, Jolly dropped out of the Senate race and sought reelection to the House, even though the 13th District had become significantly friendlier to Democrats following a court-ordered redraw of Florida's congressional map. The new map drew nearly all of St. Petersburg, along with most of the more Democratic southern portion of Pinellas County, into the 13th. The district had been in Republican hands without interruption since 1955, and had been one of the first areas of Florida to swing to the GOP from the Democratic Party. However, it had become more of a swing district at the presidential level since the 1990s; it had supported a Democrat for president in all but two elections since 1992.

In the general election, Crist defeated Jolly by a vote of 184,693 (52%) to 171,149 (48%), becoming the first Democrat to win the seat in 62 years.

==== 2018 ====
In 2018, Crist was endorsed by the League of Conservation Voters (LCV) Action Fund, which called him "a leader on protecting Florida from and planning for the impacts of climate change during his time as Governor and in Congress." Crist won a second term by a vote of 182,717 (58%) to 134,254 (42%).

==== 2020 ====
Crist was re-elected to a third term in the 2020 election, defeating Republican Anna Paulina Luna by a vote of 215,405 (53%) to 190,713 (47%).

=== Tenure ===
Crist was sworn in on January 3, 2017. He was a member of the Blue Dog Coalition, the New Democrat Coalition, the Climate Solutions Caucus and the U.S.–Japan Caucus.

On December 18, 2019, Crist voted for both articles of impeachment against President Donald Trump.

On January 13, 2021, Crist voted in favor of the single article of impeachment against President Trump during the second impeachment of Donald Trump.

Crist introduced H.R. 305, which presented the Congressional Gold Medal to Officer Eugene Goodman for his valor during the January 6 United States Capitol attack.

On August 31, 2022, Crist resigned from Congress to focus on his gubernatorial campaign.

=== Committee assignments ===
- Committee on Appropriations
  - Subcommittee on Defense
  - Subcommittee on Commerce, Justice, Science, and Related Agencies
  - Subcommittee on Financial Services and General Government
- Committee on Science, Space, and Technology
  - Subcommittee on Environment
  - Subcommittee on Space and Aeronautics

=== Caucus memberships ===
- New Democrat Coalition
- Blue Dog Coalition
- Climate Solutions Caucus
- U.S.–Japan Caucus

== Post-congressional career ==
=== 2022 gubernatorial election ===
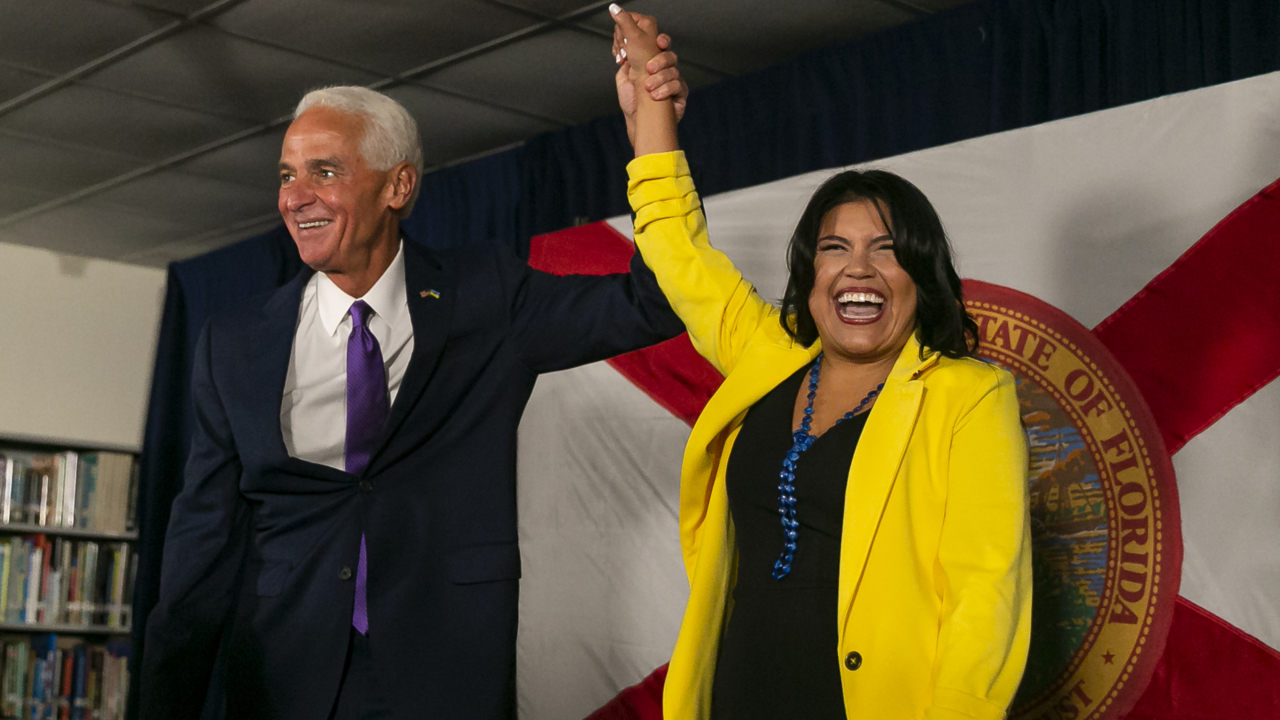
Crist with his running mate, Karla Hernández-Mats

On May 4, 2021, Crist announced his intention to run for the Democratic nomination in the 2022 Florida gubernatorial election against incumbent Ron DeSantis. "[I'm] running on decency and mutual respect," Crist explained. "I love people. And I feel for 'em right now. Gay people. Women. Blacks. They're getting the crap kicked out of 'em by this guy. It's wrong. Somebody has to stop him." Crist won the primary election on August 23, 2022, and advanced to face DeSantis in the general election on November 8, 2022. Crist's running mate for lieutenant governor was union leader Karla Hernández-Mats, president of the United Teachers of Dade. However, Crist was defeated by DeSantis, 59% to 40%, his fourth consecutive statewide general election defeat.

=== Ambassadorship nomination ===
On June 7, 2023, the White House announced that President Joe Biden had nominated Crist for the position of United States ambassador to the International Civil Aviation Organization, a United Nations agency.

=== 2026 St. Petersburg mayoral election ===
In October 2025, the Tampa Bay Times reported Crist was considering running for mayor of St. Petersburg, Florida in 2026. In April 2026, he entered the election. In the first round of the election, Crist received the most votes of any candidate, and will face incumbent mayor Ken Welch in the runoff in November.

== Political positions ==
=== Abortion ===
In 1995, while in the Florida Senate, Crist joined with two Democrats in the Senate Health Care Committee in voting against a proposal for a mandatory 24-hour waiting period before a woman could have an abortion, resulting in a 3–3 tie vote and the bill's defeat.

In 1998, while running for the U.S. Senate, Crist wrote in a Tampa Bay Times questionnaire: "I believe that a woman has the right to choose, but would prefer only after careful consideration and consultation with her family, her physician and her clergy; not her government." In a debate that year, he said he did not support a constitutional amendment banning abortion. In 2006, while running for governor, Crist said he did not support overturning Roe v. Wade and opposed a mandatory 24-hour waiting period before a woman could have an abortion.

In 2006, Crist's stance on abortion was characterized as unclear.

In early 2010, Crist said he would "fight for pro-life legislative efforts" and described himself as "pro-life".

By March 2010, however, as rumors swirled that he would leave the Republican Party and become an independent, Crist reiterated that he did not support overturning Roe v. Wade and told a Christian Family Coalition group, "We ought to, instead of change laws, change hearts."

In June 2010, after leaving the Republican Party and becoming an independent, Crist vetoed a bill that would have required, at patient cost, an ultrasound in order to receive an abortion. He called the measure "punitive" and "almost mean-spirited". The bill also included language barring abortion coverage "under a contract toward which any tax credit or cost-sharing credit is applied."

In June 2022, Crist harshly criticized the U.S. Supreme Court's overturning of Roe v. Wade, calling it "shameful, harmful, and wrong".

=== Cuba ===
In May 2014, Crist publicly supported lifting the United States embargo against Cuba, arguing it has not helped to change the Cuban government. He had supported the embargo earlier as both a Republican and independent. Also in 2014, he announced he had requested the Department of State's permission to travel to Cuba with a delegation of business, academic and economic development officials. In June, Crist indefinitely postponed the trip.

In 2019, Crist quietly visited Cuba to meet with Cuban officials, despite high bilateral tensions due to alleged Cuban support for the Maduro regime in Venezuela. The three-day trip was not announced by his congressional office and was disclosed due to required filings in the House of Representatives Committee on Ethics, with no details about it on Crist's House website. The trip was sponsored by the Center for Democracy in the Americas, an organization that "promotes a U.S. policy toward Cuba based on engagement and recognition of Cuba's sovereignty", according to its website. Photos of Crist smiling during a meeting with Cuban officials, including Cuban foreign minister Bruno Rodríguez, were published in the official newspaper of Cuba's Communist Party during his stay.

=== Environmental policy ===
In June 2008, Crist proposed that Florida buy 187,000 acres (76,000 ha) from the United States Sugar Corporation for $1.75 billion. The proposed purchase would have removed about 187,000 acres of sugar farming for Everglades restoration efforts. A fairness commission found that price to be too high by $400 million and, ultimately, the purchase was reduced to 73,000 acres (30,000 ha) of not only sugar, but also citrus for about $590 million in 2010, greatly setting back the originally touted restoration effort.

In 2007, Crist signed executive orders to impose stricter air pollution standards in Florida, with an aim to reduce greenhouse gas emissions. In his gubernatorial campaign, he opposed offshore oil drilling. He altered that position in June 2008, when oil reached peak prices, saying, "I mean, let's face it, the price of gas has gone through the roof, and Florida families are suffering, and my heart bleeds for them."

=== Fiscal policies ===
Crist supported President Obama's American Recovery and Reinvestment Act of 2009, a stimulus package in response to the Great Recession. Fellow Republicans were angered by Crist's support for the stimulus.

Crist called the act a "godsend", maintaining that it had saved the jobs of nearly 20,000 Florida schoolteachers and other school workers in 2009–2010.

=== Felons' voting rights ===
In a February 12, 2018, USA Today op-ed, Crist wrote that Florida was "one of only three states that permanently bans non-violent, ex-felons from voting" and that this "disenfranchisement of 1.5 million of our fellow citizens is shameful."

=== Gun policy ===
In 2008, Crist signed a provision preventing employers from prohibiting employees from bringing firearms to the workplace, as long as the weapons are secure and the employees have a concealed carry license.

After the December 2012 Sandy Hook Elementary School shooting, Crist announced a reversal of some of his previous stances on gun control. Before 2012, he had sometimes accused his opponents of not supporting gun rights strongly enough. He was endorsed by the NRA in 2006. In 2012, Crist announced that he supported reinstating the Federal Assault Weapons Ban, banning high-capacity magazines, and instating more extensive background checks. In the wake of the Stoneman Douglas High School shooting, he announced his support for additional measures, including a ban on bump stocks, and also said he did not support arming teachers.

When he left office as governor in 2011, Crist had an A rating from the NRA. In 2016, he received an F rating from the NRA.

=== Immigration ===
In June 2017, Crist was one of 24 House Democrats to vote for Kate's Law. The next month, he was one of five Democrats to vote to fund President Trump's border wall, and the next day, issued a statement saying that he opposed the wall.

=== LGBT rights ===
In 2006, as a proposed state constitutional amendment banning same-sex unions was headed to the ballot in Florida, Crist said that such an amendment was unnecessary because state law already barred same-sex marriages. But in September 2005, he had signed a petition for the amendment during the Republican primary at the Christian Coalition's request. Crist said in campaign materials at the time that he supported "traditional marriage". In 2008, he said he voted for the amendment, which passed.

In a debate and a radio talk show appearance in 2006, Crist indicated support for civil unions.

As governor, Crist downplayed the marriage issue, saying in a late 2007 CNN appearance: "It's not an issue that moves me. I'm just a live-and-let-live kind of guy."

For some time Crist supported Florida's ban on same-sex adoption, which had been in place since 1977. He publicly expressed support for the ban beginning when he was attorney general in 2006.

In 2008, Crist again announced his support for the Federal Marriage Amendment. Also that year, he told the Orlando Sentinel that the issue was not "top-tier" for him, even as he supported a Florida ballot measure to amend the state constitution prohibiting same-sex marriage that passed later that year.

Also in 2008, in the case of In re Gill, a Miami-Dade judge struck down the ban on same-sex couple adoption. As the case proceeded through appeals, Crist expressed support for the adoption ban as late as February 2010, but by June 2010, expressed openness to changing Florida law to allow same-sex adoption, saying a better approach "would be to let judges make that decision on a case-by-case basis".

In September 2010, Crist said that he had had an "appropriate evolution" on gay rights and was considering dropping the state's appeal of to block gay adoption. Days later, after an appeals court affirmed gay couples had a right to adopt, Crist hailed the ruling "a very good day for Florida" and "a great day for children" and announced that the state would no longer seek to enforce the ban. In a Senate debate the next month, he attributed his shift in positions to "the convergence of life experience and wisdom", saying he had become more tolerant and become less judgmental with age.

At about the same time in 2010, he declared his support for civil unions encompassing "the full range of legal protections" including "access to a loved one in the hospital, inheritance rights, the fundamental things people need to take care of their families". The voter-enacted 2008 state constitutional amendment Crist supported may nonetheless have prohibited them.

On May 9, 2013, Crist announced that he supports same-sex marriage: "I most certainly support marriage equality in Florida and look forward to the day it happens here."

In January 2014, Crist apologized for his support for the 2008 same-sex marriage ban and for the same-sex adoption ban, telling an Orlando LGBT publication: "I'm sorry I did that. It was a mistake. I was wrong. Please forgive me."

=== Marijuana legalization ===
Crist said "fully legalizing marijuana" would bring about "true justice in our state and in our country" in announcing his candidacy for governor in 2021. He also voted for the Marijuana Opportunity Reinvestment and Expungement (MORE) Act to legalize cannabis at the federal level and expunge cannabis convictions in 2020. In 2018, he introduced the Fairness in Federal Drug Testing Under State Laws Act to limit the firing of federal workers and denial of applicants for cannabis use.

=== Other issues ===
As governor, Crist supported capital punishment. He reiterated his support for it in October 2022.

After claims that computerized voting machines undercounted votes in black communities, Crist endorsed legislation requiring paper records of all ballots cast in elections.

In April 2010, Crist vetoed an education bill that would have linked teacher pay to test scores, a piece of legislation conservatives strongly supported.

Crist supported increased regulation of the insurance industry, including property insurance rates (in the aftermath of Hurricane Katrina) and health insurance. The Citizen's Property Insurance Corp and the Florida Hurricane Catastrophe Fund had been described as risky and underfunded. Standing next to former football star Dan Marino (whose son, Michael, is autistic and inspired the Dan Marino Foundation), Crist signed a law expanding health coverage statewide for autism disorders and legislation expanding low-income coverage and creating public and private insurance options in Florida.

The abortion hurdles bill Crist vetoed in June 2010 also included some provisions "intended to thwart" the Affordable Care Act, the federal health care reform legislation championed by President Obama.

In April 2022, Crist said he opposed the repeal of the Reedy Creek Improvement Act, arguing that it would hurt Florida's economy and tourism.

== Personal life ==
In July 1979, Crist married Amanda Morrow. They divorced within a year.

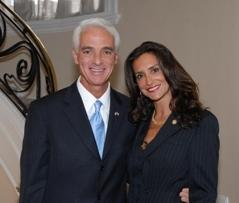
Crist and his former wife Carole Rome

Crist became engaged to Carole Rome on July 3, 2008, after nine months of dating, and they married on December 12 of that year at the First Methodist Church of St. Petersburg, of which Crist is a member. In February 2017, Crist announced that he had filed for divorce, and the divorce was completed that year.

In 2022, while running for governor again, Crist said that he was engaged to a medical sonographer whom he had met in 2017 and who is the mother of six children.

== Electoral history ==
1998 Republican primary for Florida U.S. Senate
Party	Candidate	Votes	%
Republican	Charlie Crist	365,894	66.40%
Republican	Andy Martin	184,739	33.60%
Total votes		550,633	100.00%

1998 United States Senate election in Florida
Party	Candidate	Votes	%	±%
Democratic	Bob Graham (incumbent)	2,436,407	62.47%	−2.93%
Republican	Charlie Crist	1,463,755	37.53%	+2.94%
Majority		972,652	24.94%	−5.87%
Turnout		3,900,162	46.84%	
Total votes		3,900,162	100.00%	
Democratic hold		Swing		

2000 Florida Education Commissioner election
Party	Candidate	Votes	%
Republican	Charlie Crist	2,979,297	53.72%
Democratic	George H. Sheldon	2,464,557	44.44%
Independent	Vassilla Gazetas	102,358	1.84%
Total votes		5,546,212	100.00%

2002 Republican primary results for Florida Attorney General
Party	Candidate	Votes	%
Republican	Charlie Crist	484,466	50.11
Republican	Tom Warner	257,049	26.59
Republican	Locke Burt	225,360	23.31
Total votes		966,875	100.00

2002 Florida Attorney General election
Party	Candidate	Votes	%	±%
Republican	Charlie Crist	2,636,616	53.42%	+12.98%
Democratic	Buddy Dyer	2,299,149	46.58%	−12.98%
Majority		337,467	6.84%	−12.29%
Turnout		4,935,765		
Republican gain from Democratic		Swing		

2006 Republican primary results for Florida Governor
Party	Candidate	Votes	%
Republican	Charlie Crist	630,816	63.98%
Republican	Tom Gallagher	330,165	33.49%
Republican	Vernon Palmer	13,547	1.37%
Republican	Michael W. St. Jean	11,458	1.16%
Total votes		985,986	100.00%

2006 Florida gubernatorial election
Party	Candidate	Votes	%	±%
Republican	Charlie Crist/Jeff Kottkamp	2,519,845	52.20%	−3.81%
Democratic	Jim Davis/Daryl Jones	2,178,289	45.10%	+1.94%
Reform	Max Linn	92,595	1.90%	+1.90%
Independent	John Wayne Smith	15,987	0.30%	
Independent	Richard Paul Dembinsky	11,921	0.20%	
Independent	Karl C.C. Behm	10,487	0.20%	
Write-ins		147	0.00%	0
Majority		341,556	7.10%	−5.75%
Turnout		4,829,271		
Republican hold		Swing		

2010 United States Senate election in Florida
Party	Candidate	Votes	%	±%
Republican	Marco Antonio Rubio	2,645,743	48.89%	−0.54%
Independent	Charlie Crist	1,607,549	29.71%	+29.71%
Democratic	Kendrick Brett Meek	1,092,936	20.20%	−28.12%
Libertarian	Alexander Snitker	24,850	0.46%	N/A
Independent	Sue Askeland	15,340	0.28%	N/A
Independent	Rick Tyler	7,394	0.14%	N/A
Constitution	Bernie DeCastro	4,792	0.09%	N/A
Independent	Lewis Jerome Armstrong	4,443	0.08%	N/A
Independent	Bobbie Bean	4,301	0.08%	N/A
Independent	Bruce Riggs	3,647	0.07%	N/A
Write-ins		108	0.00%	
Majority		1,038,194	19.19%	+18.08%
Turnout		5,411,106	48.25%	−22.67%
Total votes		5,411,106	100.00%	
Republican hold		Swing		

2014 Democratic primary results for Florida Governor
Party	Candidate	Votes	%
Democratic	Charlie Crist	623,001	74.36%
Democratic	Nan Rich	214,795	25.64%
Total votes		837,796	100%

2014 Florida gubernatorial election
Party	Candidate	Votes	%	±%
Republican	Rick Scott/Carlos López-Cantera (incumbent)	2,865,343	48.14%	−0.73%
Democratic	Charlie Crist/Annette Taddeo	2,801,198	47.07%	−0.65%
Libertarian	Adrian Wyllie/Greg Roe	223,356	3.75%	N/A
Independent	Glenn Burkett/Jose Augusto Matos	41,341	0.70%	N/A
Independent	Farid Khavari/Lateresa A. Jones	20,186	0.34%	+0.20%
n/a	Write-ins	137	0.00%	0.00%
Total votes		5,951,571	100.0%	N/A
Republican hold				

Florida's 13th congressional district, 2016
Party	Candidate	Votes	%
Democratic	Charlie Crist	184,693	51.9
Republican	David Jolly (incumbent)	171,149	48.1
Total votes		355,842	100.0
Democratic gain from Republican			

Florida's 13th congressional district, 2018
Party	Candidate	Votes	%
Democratic	Charlie Crist (incumbent)	182,717	57.6
Republican	George Buck	134,254	42.4
Total votes		316,971	100.0
Democratic hold			

Florida's 13th congressional district, 2020
Party	Candidate	Votes	%
Democratic	Charlie Crist (incumbent)	215,405	53.03%
Republican	Anna Paulina Luna	190,713	46.95%
Independent Republican	Jacob Curnow (write-in)	7	0.01%
Total votes		406,125	100.0
Democratic hold			

2022 Democratic primary results for Florida Governor
Party	Candidate	Votes	%
Democratic	Charlie Crist	903,531	59.7
Democratic	Nicole "Nikki" Fried	534,800	35.3
Democratic	Cadance Daniel	38,133	2.5
Democratic	Robert L. Willis	36,716	2.4
Total votes		1,513,180	100.00

2022 Florida gubernatorial election
Party	Candidate	Votes	%	±%
Republican	Ron DeSantis (incumbent) Jeanette Nuñez (incumbent)	4,614,210	59.37%	+9.78%
Democratic	Charlie Crist Karla Hernandez	3,106,313	39.97%	−9.22%
Independent	Carmen Jackie Gimenez Kyle "KC" Gibson	31,577	0.41%	N/A
Libertarian	Hector Roos Jerry "Tub" Rorabaugh	19,299	0.25%	N/A
Total votes		7,771,399	100.0%	N/A

== Books ==
- The Party's Over: How the Extreme Right Hijacked the GOP and I Became a Democrat (2014) ISBN 978-0525954415

== See also ==
- List of Arab and Middle-Eastern Americans in the United States Congress
- List of American politicians who switched parties in office
- List of party switchers; Republican to Independent to Democrat

Party political offices
Preceded by Bill Grant	Republican nominee for U.S. Senator from Florida (Class 3); 1998	Succeeded by Mel Martinez
Preceded by Tom Gallagher	Republican nominee for Education Commissioner of Florida; 2000	Elections abolished
Preceded by David Bludworth	Republican nominee for Attorney General of Florida; 2002	Succeeded by Bill McCollum
Preceded by Jeb Bush	Republican nominee for Governor of Florida; 2006	Succeeded by Rick Scott
Preceded by Alex Sink	Democratic nominee for Governor of Florida; 2014	Succeeded by Andrew Gillum
Preceded by Andrew Gillum	Democratic nominee for Governor of Florida; 2022	Succeeded by David Jolly
Political offices
Preceded by Tom Gallagher	Education Commissioner of Florida; 2001–2003	Succeeded by Jim Horne
Preceded by Jeb Bush	Governor of Florida; 2007–2011	Succeeded by Rick Scott
Preceded by Ken Welch	Mayor of St. Petersburg; Taking office 2027	Elect
Legal offices
Preceded by Richard Doran	Attorney General of Florida; 2003–2007	Succeeded by Bill McCollum
U.S. House of Representatives
Preceded by David Jolly	Member of the U.S. House of Representatives from Florida's 13th congressional district 2017–2022	Succeeded by Anna Paulina Luna
U.S. order of precedence (ceremonial)
Preceded by Jeb Bush as Former Governor	Order of precedence of the United States; Within Florida	Succeeded by Jack Markell as Former Governor
Preceded by Jeb Bush as Former Governor	Order of precedence of the United States; Outside Florida	Succeeded by Terry Branstad as Former Governor
