= Lenore Anderson =

American activist

Lenore Anderson is the president of the Alliance for Safety and Justice, an organization whose stated mission is to "win new safety priorities in states across the country [by] partner[ing] with leaders and advocates to advance state reform through networking, coalition building, research, education and advocacy."

== Career ==
Anderson started her career as the director of the Books Not Bars campaign at the Ella Baker Center for Human Rights. Following this, she served as the Director of Public Safety for the Oakland Mayor, the director of the San Francisco Mayor's Office of Criminal Justice, and as the Chief of Policy and Chief of the Alternative Programs Division at the San Francisco District Attorney's Office. In 2012, Anderson founded Californians for Safety and Justice, an organization focusing on reforming criminal justice in California and centering the conversation around crime survivors. In 2016, Anderson expanded upon her work in California by launching the national organization Alliance for Safety and Justice alongside Robert Rooks, focusing largely on the states with the highest incarceration rates and helping enact new policies in Florida, Illinois, Michigan, and Ohio. Anderson's work with crime survivors eventually led to the launch of Crime Survivors for Safety and Justice, a network of survivors calling for new safety priorities that focus on prevention, treatment, and rehabilitation. Her book In Their Names was published by The New Press in 2022.

== Ballot measures and initiatives ==
Anderson was the Campaign Chair and co-author of 2014 California Proposition 47, a ballot initiative to reduce incarceration and reallocate prison spending to treatment, prevention, and victim services. Anderson served on the Steering Committee for 2016 California Proposition 57, a ballot initiative that incentivizes inmate rehabilitation through earned time credit and risk-based parole reviews. It also prohibits prosecutors from filing cases against juvenile defendants in adult criminal court.

== Awards ==
In 2016 Anderson received the James Irvine Foundation Leadership Award for her efforts in California. In 2015 she was awarded the Frank Carrington Crime Victim Attorney Award by the American Bar Association.

== Education ==
Anderson holds a J.D. from NYU School of Law and a B.A. from UC Berkeley.
