= Robert Rooks (organizer) =

American strategist

Robert Rooks is a strategist, movement leader, and chief executive officer of Reform Alliance.

== Early life and education ==
Rooks grew up in the Oak Cliff neighborhood of Dallas. After the crack epidemic took root in the neighborhood, his mother relocated their family to DeSoto, Texas. During these years Rooks lost multiple friends to violence. These early experiences led to his involvement in social justice work. Rooks received his undergraduate degree at Prairie View A&M before attending University of Connecticut for his Master of Social Work.

== Career ==
Rooks got his start in community organizing in Connecticut, where he knocked on doors and built coalitions to advocate for policy change. There, he helped pass legislation to eliminate disparities in sentencing for crack and powder cocaine, making Connecticut the first state in the nation to do so. Rooks served as the first Criminal Justice Director of the NAACP, where during his tenure the organization called for an end to the war on drugs. Rooks also served as the organizing director for Californians for Safety and Justice, and as the CEO for Alliance for Safety and Justice, which he co-founded in 2016 alongside Lenore Anderson.

Rooks organized the ‘Yes on 47’ campaign to help pass 2014 California Proposition 47, a ballot initiative that reclassified certain low-level felonies as misdemeanors. In Illinois, Rooks helped pass the Neighborhood Safety Act, which expanded access to trauma recovery services for crime survivors and incentivized people in prison to participate in rehabilitation programs. Rooks also served on the executive committee of 2018 Florida Amendment 4, which passed with 64% of the vote and restored voting rights to an estimated 1.4 million Florida residents.

In 2021, Rooks was appointed CEO of Reform Alliance, an organization working to reform the criminal justice system by changing probation and parole. In his work with REFORM, he has focused on underemployment and economic disparities resulting from incarceration, probation, and parole. He advocates for reform as a solution to labor shortages and a catalyst for economic growth. He has spoken about a “second chance shortage” in the job market and advocated for second chance hiring as a solution. While at REFORM, Rooks has organized large job fairs at NBA arenas that are open to people with records.

== Awards and recognitions ==
Rooks has been a featured speaker at the Harvard Radcliffe Institute, Columbia Business School, Stanford University, The Atlantic Festival, the American Public Health Association, and the New York State Business Council. He has been recognized for his work with a Champion of Justice Award by the Bipartisan Justice Center.

== Personal life ==
Rooks has three sons. He also has a nephew who has served time in prison and on probation, and Rooks has spoken about how this experience, combined with his childhood experiences in Texas, has informed his career in organizing for safer communities.
