= Right On Crime =

Conservative U.S. criminal justice reform initiative

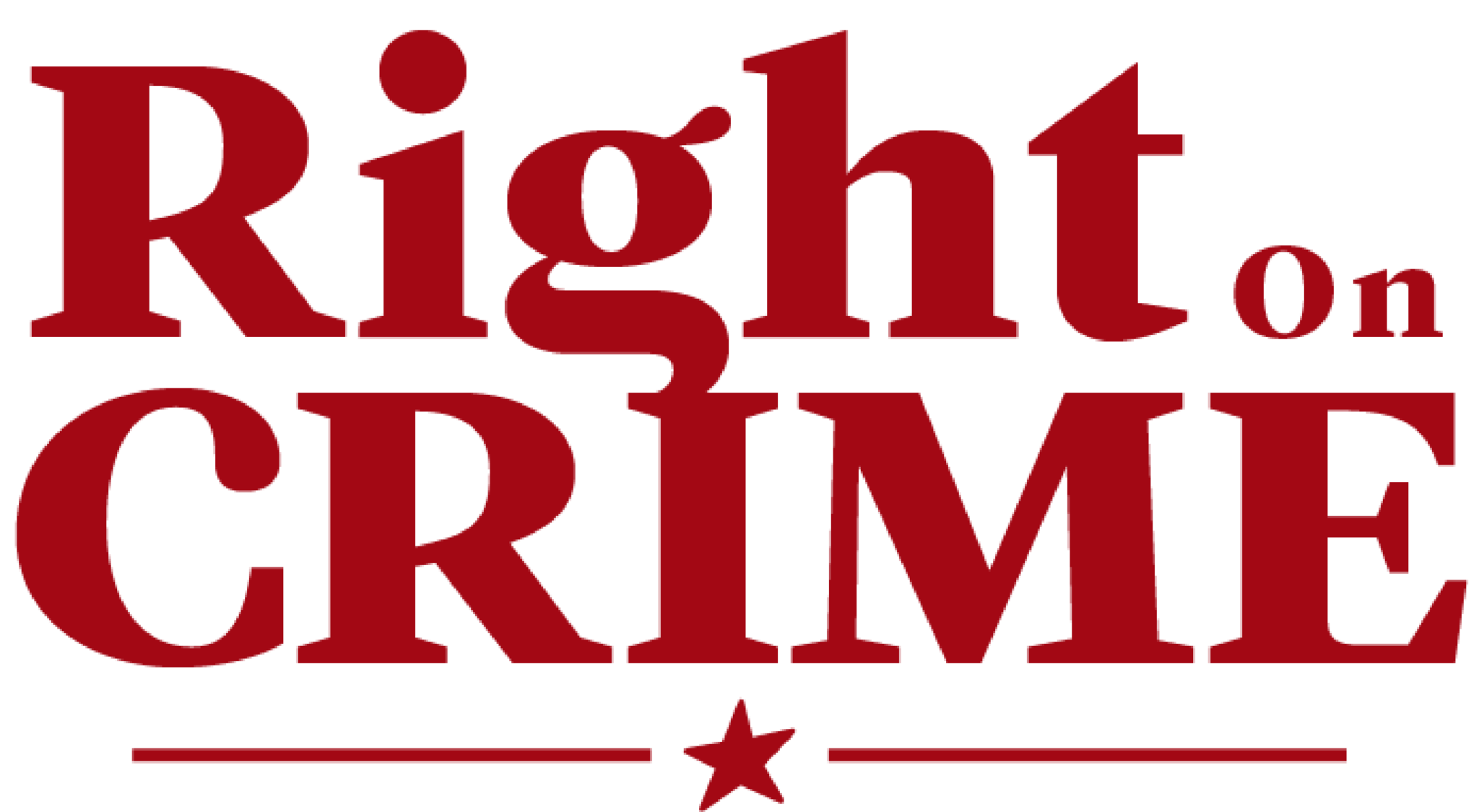
- Purpose: Criminal justice reform, prison reform, parole reform
- Location: United States
- Parent organization: Texas Public Policy Foundation
- Website: rightoncrime.com

Right On Crime is an American conservative criminal justice reform initiative in the U.S. that aims to gain support for criminal justice reform by sharing research and policy ideas, mobilizing leaders, and raising public awareness. Right On Crime reforms are focused on "reducing crime, restoring victims, reforming offenders, and lowering taxpayers' costs." The initiative primarily focuses on nine issues: prosecutorial innovation, correctional leadership, over-criminalization, civil asset forfeiture, juvenile justice, adult probation, parole and re-entry, law enforcement, and victims' rights. Right On Crime is a campaign of the Texas Public Policy Foundation, a conservative think tank. After its founding in Texas, Right On Crime has contributed to many criminal justice reforms in over 38 states, working with bipartisan partners throughout the country.

== Background ==
The Right On Crime initiative began its public affairs campaign in 2010. It was created in Texas in 2007 through a campaign by the Texas Public Policy Foundation in partnership with the American Conservative Union Foundation and Prison Fellowship. Right On Crime's website lists policy analysts, researchers, and law experts. They have helped create reform in 38 states through activities such as "...pass[ing] comprehensive juvenile justice reform bills... clos[ing] prisons, and divert[ing] savings back to the taxpayers and to recidivism-reducing programs."

Marc Levin founded Right On Crime and helped shift the conservative "tough on crime" approach that seeks to expand the criminal justice system into a fiscally conservative approach. Other Right On Crime supporters include Newt Gingrich, Pat Nolan, Jeb Bush, Rick Perry, and more. Regarding recidivism rates, Gingrich and Mark Earley contextualize the problem's magnitude by saying, "[i]f two-thirds of public school students dropped out, or two-thirds of all bridges built collapsed within three years, would citizens tolerate it?" Right On Crime also has partnerships with the Coalition for Public Safety, which contains both progressive and conservative groups with a common goal of making the criminal justice system fairer and more cost-effective. This Koch Industries funded organization works to create criminal justice reforms that reduce incarceration rates and end over criminalization, having obtained over $5 million in funding.

According to a January 2011 article in The Washington Post by former U.S. Speaker of the House Newt Gingrich and former California House Republican Leader Pat Nolan, "The Right on Crime Campaign represents a seismic shift in the legislative landscape. And it opens the way for a common-sense left-right agreement on an issue that has kept the parties apart for decades." Charlie Savage of The New York Times noted the conservative movement's growing support for Right On Crime in a Times editorial in October 2011, writing "The [corrections overhaul] movement has attracted the support of several prominent conservatives, including Edwin R. Meese III, the attorney general during the Reagan administration. He is part of a campaign, called 'Right On Crime,' which was begun last December to lend weight to what it calls the 'conservative case for reform.'"

Beginning in 2011, Right on Crime expanded its campaign into individual states, including Texas, Georgia, Oklahoma, and Florida. As of 2023, Right On Crime expanded its year-round presence to also include Arizona, Louisiana, Mississippi, New Mexico, North Carolina, Utah, Virginia, and West Virginia.

In 2014, the BBC reported that in Texas, rather than building new prisons, Right On Crime has led to the closure of three prisons.

== Statement of Principles ==
Right On Crime's Statement of Principles has been signed by over 90 conservative leaders. It advocates for cost-effective approaches to criminal justice spending, striving to "produce the best possible results at the lowest possible cost." The statement describes how the current criminal justice system does not work for every offender and may in fact be counterproductive by hardening low-risk offenders. The organization believes that safety is a core government responsibility, but also describes the importance of upholding conservative values such as a constitutionally limited government. Other values include "...transparency, individual liberty, personal responsibility, free enterprise, and the centrality of the family and community."

The organization's principles describe how the criminal justice system should lower crime rates, collect victim restitution, and reduce taxpayer spending. It explains how the criminal justice system's key "consumers", including the public, victims, and taxpayers, should have a voice in defining justice.

== Right On Crime signatories ==
Right On Crime's Statement of Principles has been signed by over 90 individuals including:

- Jeff Atwater, Former Florida Senate President
- Bob Barr, Former Prosecutor, Former Member of the U.S. House of Representatives, Georgia’s 7th District
- David Barton, WallBuilders
- William J. Bennett, Former U.S. Secretary of Education and Federal “Drug Czar”
- Allan Bense, Former Speaker of the Florida House
- Ken Blackwell, Former Ohio Secretary of State
- L. Brent Bozell, Founder, Media Research Center and Chairman of ForAmerica
- Matthew J. Brouillette, Commonwealth Foundation (PA)
- Jeb Bush, Former Governor of Florida
- Dominic M. Calabro, Florida Tax Watch (FL)
- Jon Caldara, Independence Institute (CO)
- Dean Cannon, Former Florida Speaker
- Chuck Colson, Prison Fellowship Ministries
- Ward Connerly, American Civil Rights Institute; Former Regent of the University of California
- Monica Crowley, Ph.D., Fox News political analyst
- Jim DeMint, Former South Carolina Senator
- Craig DeRoche, Senior Vice President of Advocacy & Public Policy of Prison Fellowship, Former Speaker of the Michigan House of Representatives
- Donald Devine, Former Director, Office of Personnel Management
- Viet Dinh, Georgetown University Law Center and former U.S. Assistant Attorney General
- Richard Doran, Former Florida Attorney General
- Robert Ehrlich, Former Maryland Governor
- Erick Erickson, The Resurgent
- Luis Fortuño, Former Puerto Rico Governor
- Don Gaetz, Former Florida Senate President
- Newt Gingrich, Former Speaker of the House of Representatives; American Solutions for Winning the Future
- Jack Graham, Pastor of Prestonwood Baptist Church
- Mike Haridopolos, Former Florida Senate President
- Bill Haslam, Former Governor of Tennessee
- Mike Huckabee, Former Arkansas Governor
- B. Wayne Hughes Jr., Businessman/Philanthropist
- Asa Hutchinson, Governor of Arkansas;Former U.S. Attorney and Administrator of the U.S. Drug Enforcement Administration
- Bishop Harry Jackson, Hope Christian Church
- Henry Juszkiewicz, Gibson Guitar
- David Keene, American Conservative Union
- George Kelling, Manhattan Institute (NY)
- Bernard Kerik, Former New York City Police Commissioner
- Rabbi Daniel Lapin, American Alliance of Jews and Christians
- Edwin Meese III
- John S. McCollister, Platte Institute (NE)
- B.J. Nikkel, Former House Republican Majority Whip, Colorado House of Representatives
- Pat Nolan, Former Republican Leader of the California State Assembly
- Grover Norquist, Americans for Tax Reform
- Star Parker, Center for Urban Renewal and Education
- Tony Perkins, Family Research Council
- Rick Perry, Former Governor of Texas
- Kevin Roberts, Heritage Foundation & former Texas Public Policy Foundation
- Ralph Reed, Founder of the Faith and Freedom Coalition
- Brooke Rollins, America First Policy Institute & former Texas Public Policy Foundation
- Kris Steele, Former Speaker of the Oklahoma House of Representatives
- Mike Thompson, Thomas Jefferson Institute for Public Policy (VA)
- John Tillman, Illinois Policy Institute (IL), President, Think Freely Media
- Brett Tolman, Executive Director of Right On Crime and Former U.S. Attorney, District of Utah; Former Counsel, Senate Judiciary Committee
- Richard Viguerie, ConservativeHQ.com
- J.C. Watts, Former Member of the U.S. House of Representatives, Oklahoma’s 4th District
- Will Weatherford, Former Speaker of the Florida House
- Bob Woodson, Center for Neighborhood Enterprise

== The First Step Act ==
Right On Crime supports the First Step Act and cosigned its endorsement letter to Congress, along with 41 other organizations. The act includes programming to reduce recidivism rates and lower mandatory minimums. The First Step Act was approved on December 18, 2018, in a 87 to 12 vote through the Senate. Right On Crime signatory Ken Cuccinelli states that "these common-sense reforms will improve public safety by reducing recidivism and provide a second chance to those who have served their time and who want to live law-abiding, productive lives."
