= Kathleen Hartnett White =

American government official and policy advisor (born 1949)

Kathleen White
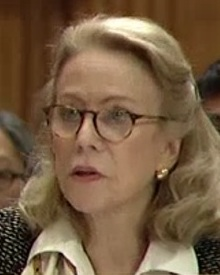

Personal details
- Born: Kathleen Mary Hartnett; October 19, 1949 Salina, Kansas, U.S.
- Died: August 6, 2024 (aged 74) Bastrop, Texas, U.S.
- Party: Republican
- Education: Stanford University (BA, MA); Princeton University (attended); Texas Tech University, Lubbock (attended)

Kathleen Hartnett White (October 19, 1949 – August 6, 2024) was a Republican American former government official and environmental policy advisor. White served as a senior fellow at the free-market think tank Texas Public Policy Foundation. She was nominated by President Donald Trump to lead the Council on Environmental Quality; the nomination was later withdrawn.

== Education ==
White graduated from Salina High School in Kansas in 1967. She received a bachelor's and master's degree in humanities and religion from Stanford University. She attended Princeton University's comparative religion doctoral program and completed one year of law school at Texas Tech University School of Law.

== Career ==
White was special assistant to Nancy Reagan in the 1980s, then worked for the National Cattlemen's Beef Association in Washington, D.C., being involved in private lands and the environment. Back in Texas, White became director of the Ranching Heritage Association, then served on the Texas Economic Development Commission in Austin. She was named by Governor Rick Perry to the Texas Commission on Environmental Quality, where she served for six years, including a period of service as chairman.

In 2008, she began working for the Texas Public Policy Foundation, a right-wing conservative think-tank, where she was named Distinguished Senior Fellow-in-Residence and Director of the Armstrong Center for Energy & the Environment. She co-authored the book Fueling Freedom: Exposing the Mad War on Energy with Stephen Moore in 2016.

=== Nomination to Council on Environmental Quality ===
In October 2017, President Donald Trump nominated White for the position of White House senior advisor on environmental policy. Had she been confirmed by the United States Senate, she would have led the Council on Environmental Quality. On December 21, 2017, the United States Senate sent her nomination back to the White House. Trump resubmitted his nomination of White in January 2018.

Her nomination drew controversy due to her history of advocacy for fringe theories and pseudoscience. Hartnett rejects the scientific opinion on climate change and has mocked the findings of the Intergovernmental Panel on Climate Change. She has called for increased use of fossil fuels and criticized the Endangered Species Act. She said carbon dioxide was not a pollutant but "a necessary nutrient for plant life" and that there were "really beneficial impacts of carbon dioxide in our atmosphere". She has denied the scientific evidence there has been "unprecedented warming of the climate, extreme weather events, declining Arctic ice, and rising sea levels". She has complained about "Apocalyptic Anthropogenic Global Warming" being "the Left's secular religion" and that "grand schemes to decarbonize human societies" are part of the "unabashedly totalitarian policy of the Left."

White has compared the work of mainstream climate scientists to "the dogmatic claims of ideologues and clerics." During her November 2017 Senate confirmation hearing, she defended past statements that particulate pollution released by burning fuels is not harmful unless one were to suck on a car's tailpipe.

At White's Senate confirmation hearing in November 2017, she stated that her top three environmental concerns are air quality, the potential failure of wastewater and drinking water systems, and climate change. During her hearing she said, "I am not a scientist, but in my personal capacity, I have many questions that remain unanswered by current climate policy. We need to have a more precise explanation of the human role and the natural role."

In February 2018, the White House confirmed their intention to withdraw the nomination of Hartnett White as a senior advisor on environmental policy.
