= 1998 United States Senate election in Florida =

- November 3, 1998
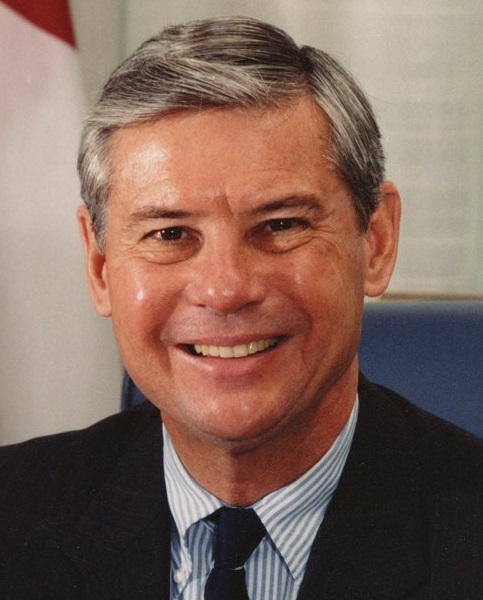

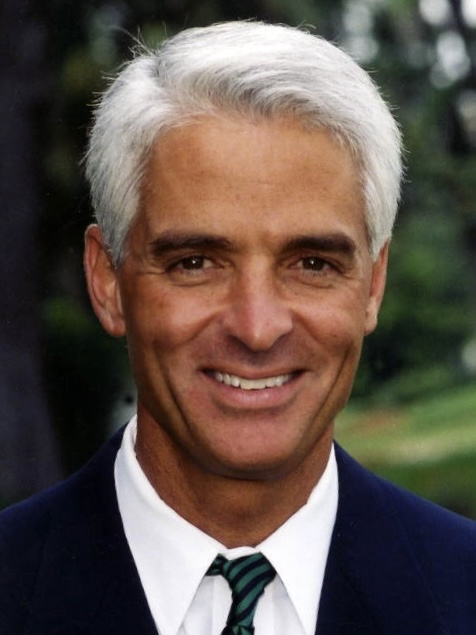
Nominee	Bob Graham	Charlie Crist
Party	Democratic	Republican
Popular vote	2,436,407	1,463,755
Percentage	62.47%	37.53%
- Graham: 50–60% 60–70% 70–80% 80–90% >90% Crist: 50–60% 60–70% 70–80% 80–90% >90% Tie: 40–50% 50% No votes
U.S. senator before election
Bob Graham
Democratic
Elected U.S. Senator
Bob Graham
Democratic

The 1998 United States Senate election in Florida was held November 3, 1998. Democratic incumbent Bob Graham was easily re-elected to a third term over Republican state senator Charlie Crist.

== Democratic primary ==
=== Candidates ===
- Bob Graham, incumbent U.S. senator since 1987

=== Results ===
Democratic primary results
Party	Candidate	Votes	%
Democratic	Bob Graham (incumbent)	909,349	100.00%

== Republican primary ==
=== Candidates ===
- Charlie Crist, state senator from St. Petersburg
- Andy Martin, perennial candidate

=== Results ===
Republican Primary results
Party	Candidate	Votes	%
Republican	Charlie Crist	365,894	66.40%
Republican	Andy Martin	184,739	33.60%
Total votes		550,633	100.00%

== General election ==
=== Candidates ===
- Charlie Crist, state senator from St. Petersburg (Republican)
- Bob Graham, incumbent U.S. senator since 1987 (Democratic)

=== Polling ===
Poll source	Date(s)	Sample size (Note: Key: A – all adults RV – registered voters LV – likely voters V – unclear)	Margin of error	Bob Graham (D)	Charlie Crist (R)	Other / undecided (Note: Calculated by taking the difference of 100% and all other candidates combined.)
Harris Insights & Analytics	October 30, 1998	2,819	—	61%	39%	0%
Mason-Dixon Polling & Strategy	October 26–28, 1998	822 (LV)	± 3.5%	59%	31%	10%
Independent Market Research of Tampa (Note: Poll sponsored by the St. Petersburg Times)	October 21–23, 1998	670 (LV)	± 3.8%	61%	25%	14%
Fleming & Associates	October 22, 1998	557	—	61%	31%	8%
Market Research Institute Inc.	October 22, 1998	670	—	61%	25%	14%
Harris Insights & Analytics	October 20, 1998	2,295	—	60%	31%	9%
Mason-Dixon Polling & Strategy	October 15–18, 1998	836 (LV)	± 3.5%	58%	32%	10%
Mason-Dixon Polling & Strategy	September 22–24, 1998	815 (LV)	± 3.5%	59%	30%	11%
Forman Center for Political Studies	September 9–23, 1998	403 (LV)	± 5.0%	62%	26%	12%
Mason-Dixon Polling & Strategy	August 24–25, 1998	804 (LV)	± 3.5%	59%	28%	13%
Mason-Dixon Polling & Strategy	July 17–20, 1998	802 (LV)	± 3.5%	61%	28%	11%
Mason-Dixon Polling & Strategy	April 16–18, 1998	813 (LV)	± 3.5%	59%	27%	14%

=== Results ===
Graham defeated Crist in a landslide, with Crist winning just four of the state's sixty-seven counties: Clay, Collier, Okaloosa, and Santa Rosa. There were no third party or independent candidates.

General election results
Party	Candidate	Votes	%	±%
Democratic	Bob Graham (incumbent)	2,436,407	62.47%	−2.93%
Republican	Charlie Crist	1,463,755	37.53%	+2.94%
Majority		972,652	24.94%	−5.87%
Turnout		3,900,162	46.84%	
Total votes		3,900,162	100.00%	
Democratic hold		Swing		

== See also ==
- 1998 United States Senate elections

== Notes ==
Partisan clients
