= Texas Public Policy Foundation =

Conservative think tank

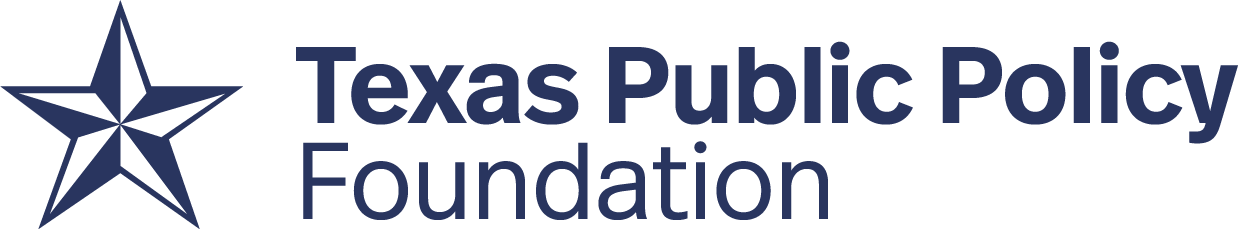
- Founders: James R. Leininger; Fritz S. Steiger
- Established: 1989; 37 years ago
- Focus: Texas state government
- Chief Executive Officer: Greg Sindelar
- Staff: 100+
- Budget: Revenue: $28.7 million Expenses: $26.2 million (FYE December 2024)
- Address: 901 Congress Avenue; Austin, Texas 78701
- Coordinates: 30.2709°N 97.7413°W
- Interactive map of Texas Public Policy Foundation
- Website: texaspolicy.com

The Texas Public Policy Foundation (TPPF) is an American conservative think tank based in Austin, Texas. The organization was co-founded in 1989 by James R. Leininger and Fritz S. Steiger, who sought intellectual support for his education reform ideas, including public school vouchers. Projects of the organization include Right on Crime, which is focused on criminal justice reform, and Fueling Freedom, which seeks to "explain the forgotten moral case for fossil fuels."

== History ==
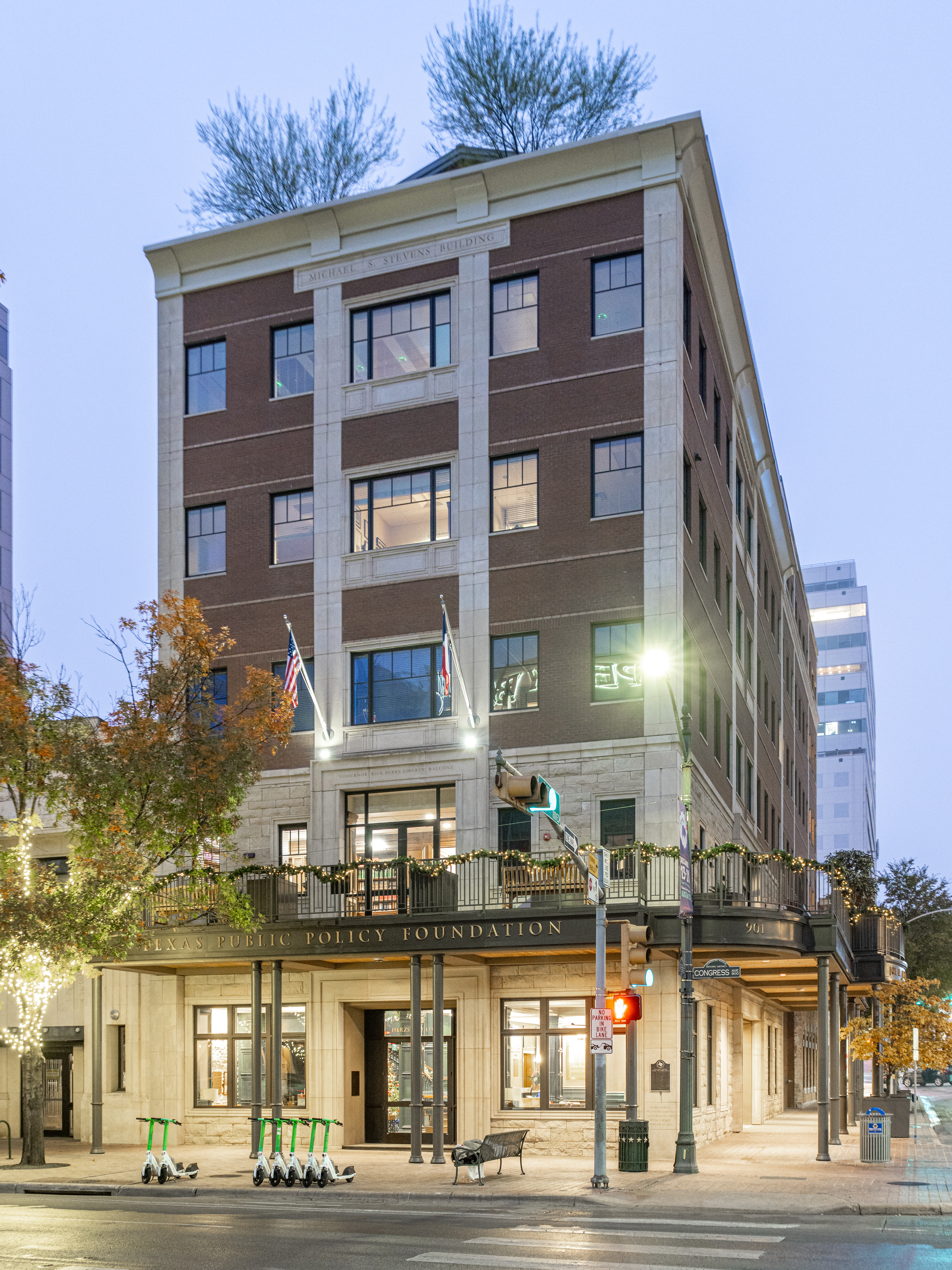
Headquarters of the Texas Public Policy Foundation, 2025

TPPF was initially co-founded in 1989 by James R. Leininger, a physician, businessman and conservative activist from San Antonio, Texas, and Fritz S. Steiger, a businessman who had formerly worked for George H. W. Bush and Sam Walton. Leininger is notable for his school voucher and privatization activism. The organization's board of directors includes 19 individuals. Originally based in San Antonio, it was relocated in 2003 to Austin, Texas, to be near the state capitol. In February 2015, TPPF moved into a new $20-million building two blocks from the Texas Capitol.

In 2010, TPPF received funding from Koch Industries as well as Geo Prison Group, a GEO Group company. Donors to the organization have included energy companies Chevron, ExxonMobil, and other fossil fuel interests.

In January 2018, the organization announced that it had opened a new office in Washington, D.C. At the time, TPPF had more than 75 employees based in Texas; it announced plans to increase its D.C.-based staff from 5 to as many as 15 employees in 2018 in order to expand the group's work in the areas of environmental and health care policy and criminal justice reform.

In February 2019, the organization hired former U.S. Representative John Hostettler, a Republican from Indiana, to lead its state-based policy efforts. The Texas Public Policy Foundation States Trust initiative promotes policy ideas aimed at increasing states' rights and decreasing the role of the federal government in areas including energy regulation, spending, and health care.

== Organization and activities ==
TPPF is organized into nine issue-area centers and a litigation arm.

During the year, TPPF hosts monthly policy events ("Policy Primers") covering a range of issues, and an annual conference ("Policy Orientation for the Texas Legislature"). The 2015 policy orientation included Steve Forbes, Newt Gingrich, and Phil Gramm.

In 2013, TPPF published The Texas Model: Prosperity in the Lone Star State and Lessons for America. TPPF also publishes a quarterly journal titled Veritas.

Current U.S. senator Ted Cruz formerly headed TPPF's Center for Tenth Amendment Studies.

The organization sponsors the Right on Crime initiative, an effort to reduce crime, restore victims, and replace mass incarceration with more cost-effective and humane sentencing and criminal punishment.

In October 2017, the White House announced that President Donald Trump had selected Kathleen Hartnett White to serve as chair of the Council on Environmental Quality. At the time, White was a fellow at TPPF. White had said that climate change does not exist and that United Nations findings on climate change are "not validated and politically corrupt." She argued that carbon dioxide levels are good for life on Earth, that carbon dioxide is not a pollutant, and that "fossil fuels dissolved the economic justification for slavery." In February 2018, the White House confirmed its intention to withdraw its nomination of Hartnett White as a senior advisor on environmental policy.

TPPF has been described by NPR as "an influential think tank that opposes efforts to fight climate change and receives millions of dollars from fossil fuel interests." A 2023 study by TPPF found that the total cost of fueling an electric vehicle would equate to an electric vehicle owner "paying $17.33 per gallon of gasoline."

TPPF lobbied for the Texas legislature to ban the prescription of puberty blockers and hormone treatments for minors.

TPPF is a member of the advisory board of Project 2025, a collection of conservative and right-wing policy proposals from the Heritage Foundation to reshape the United States federal government and consolidate executive power should the Republican nominee win the 2024 presidential election.

== Notable staff ==
- Chuck DeVore, vice president of national initiatives
- Talmadge L. Heflin, distinguished senior fellow
- John Hostettler, vice president of federal affairs
- Thomas Lindsay, director of Higher Education Policy
- Ron Simmons, director of Right on Work
- Carol M. Swain, distinguished senior fellow
- Joshua Treviño, chief of intelligence and research
- Zach Whiting, senior fellow of technology policy

== See also ==
- Kevin Roberts
- State Policy Network
