= Alliance for Safety and Justice =

American criminal justice reform organization

- Founders: Lenore Anderson; Robert Rooks
- Type: Nonprofit
- Purpose: Justice reform; Prison reform
- Location: United States
- Website: allianceforsafetyandjustice.org

Alliance for Safety and Justice (ASJ) is an American organization committed to criminal justice reform. The organization focuses on crime reduction and victim support.

== History ==
Alliance for Safety and Justice was co-founded by Lenore Anderson and Robert Rooks. ASJ creates networks of crime survivors and works to shift resources from incarceration to effective alternatives.

== Overview ==
The organization focuses on reforms in eight states: Florida, Illinois, Ohio, Michigan, Texas, Arizona, Pennsylvania, and California. These states were chosen due to high incarceration rates or their consideration of important legislation. The organization has worked to advocate for the restoration of voting rights to former felons. Anderson serves as the Chief Executive and President of the organization.

Californians for Safety and Justice

Californians for Safety and Justice is the largest criminal justice organization in California.

Crime Survivors for Safety and Justice

Crime Survivors for Safety and Justice is the flagship program of ASJ. Crime Survivors for Safety and Justice advocates for governments to invest in programs that provide violence intervention and mental health support for communities.

== See also ==
- Center on Juvenile and Criminal Justice
- Legal Aid Society of the District of Columbia
