= Richard E. Doran =

American politician in Florida (born 1956)

34th Attorney General of Florida
- In office November 5, 2002 – January 3, 2003
- Governor: Jeb Bush
- Preceded by: Bob Butterworth
- Succeeded by: Charlie Crist

Chief Deputy Attorney General of Florida
- In office 1997 – November 5, 2002

Personal details
- Born: Richard Edward Doran; December 26, 1956 (age 69) Warren, Ohio, U.S.
- Education: Bethany College (BA); Stetson University (JD)

Richard Edward Doran (born December 26, 1956) is an American attorney from Tallahassee, Florida. He served as the 34th Attorney General of Florida from November 5, 2002, to January 3, 2003.

== Early career ==
Doran received his B.A. from Bethany College (West Virginia) in 1978 and his J.D. from Stetson University College of Law in 1981.

From 1995 to 1997, he served as General Counsel, Florida Department of Health and Rehabilitative Services. Doran was Chief Deputy Attorney General of the State of Florida, from 1997 to 2002, working under Attorney General of Florida Bob Butterworth.

== Post Attorney-General career ==
Doran was appointed chairman, Second Circuit Judicial Nominating Commission 2006 - 2007 and again 2010 - 2011.

He is currently a shareholder in the Tallahassee, Florida law firm of Ausley McMullen, where he specializes in the practice of state government regulation and civil litigation. He also advises clients on compliance with state level campaign, lobbying and ethics laws, on public records and open meetings laws and state procurement laws. He is counsel of record in over 200 reported appellate cases.

In 2015 Doran was awarded the Francis X. Bellotti award at the annual meeting of the National association of Attorneys General for his efforts on behalf of the Society of Attorneys General Emeritus (SAGE).

Doran is a founding Director of the Tallahassee-based think tank Project on Accountable Justice and currently serves as Chair of the executive committee.
