= Coalition for Public Safety =

U.S. criminal justice reform organization

- Formation: 19 February 2015
- Executive Director: Holly Harris
- Endowment: $5 million
- Website: www.coalitionforpublicsafety.org

The Coalition for Public Safety is a bipartisan coalition of progressive and conservative American advocacy groups dedicated to criminal justice reform, established in February 2015.

== Members ==
Its members include conservative organizations such as Koch Industries and Americans for Tax Reform, as well as left-wing organizations such as the Center for American Progress and the American Civil Liberties Union (ACLU). Neera Tanden, the president of the Center for American Progress, said that the Center had been, and would continue to be, critical of the Koch brother companies' agenda, but added that "where we can find common ground on issues, we will go forward".

== Goals ==
The organization plans a multimillion-dollar campaign in support of proposals to reduce prison populations and recidivism, among other initiatives. The ACLU's executive director, Anthony D. Romero, has said that the Coalition plans to target civil forfeiture as one of their first areas for reform.
