= Frank Peterman =

American politician

Frank Winston Peterman, Jr

Member of the Florida House of Representatives from the 55th district
- In office 2000–2008
- Preceded by: Rudy Bradley
- Succeeded by: Darryl Rouson

Personal details
- Born: June 25, 1962 (age 64)
- Party: Democratic

Frank Winston Peterman, Jr. (born June 25, 1962) is a Democratic politician who was a member of the Florida House of Representatives for District 55 and who served as the Secretary of the Florida Department of Juvenile Justice. He was first elected to the Florida House in 2000 and served until 2008. He was appointed by Governor Charlie Crist to head the Department of Juvenile Justice in February 2008, where he served until February 2011. His appointment spurred a special election to serve out the remainder of his term that was won by Darryl Rouson, former St. Petersburg NAACP president. Peterman is married to St. Petersburg native June Kicklighter and they have four children.

== Early life and background ==
Frank W. Peterman, Jr. was born in St. Petersburg, Florida. His parents were both civil rights pioneers in Pinellas County. His father, Frank Sr., a graduate of Morehouse College and Howard University Law School, was a civil rights attorney. In 1968, Frank Peterman, Sr. was the first African American in Pinellas County to win a primary election in a race for the Florida House of Representatives. He qualified on March 18, 1966, and ran on a platform of education and tax equality. His mother, Peggy Peterman, was also a Howard University law school graduate. She worked for the then St. Petersburg Times, (now the Tampa Bay Times) for 31 years as a reporter, columnist and editorial writer. Frank Peterman, Jr. matriculated through the Pinellas County public school system and graduated from Lakewood High School, where he played quarterback on the football team. In 1985, he graduated from Morehouse College with a Bachelor of Arts degree in English. Peterman also briefly attended Dallas Theological Seminary where he enrolled in the Biblical Studies program.

Following graduation, Peterman returned to St. Petersburg where he was a graduate of Leadership St. Pete and worked in insurance. He also served as a member of the Community Alliance and served on the Enoch Davis Center advisory board. He was then program director for Blacks Against Dangerous Drugs (BADD) and worked as a crime prevention specialist with the Pinellas County Urban League.

== Entry into politics and election to city council ==
In 1992, Peterman ran to replace Charles Shorter as councilman for District 6 of the St. Petersburg City Council. He ran on a change platform, saying he would work toward economic development, crime prevention, and diversity in government. He had recently been appointed by Governor Lawton Chiles to the Pinellas County Housing Authority. He was defeated by returning City Councilman David T. Welch, who had served from 1981 to 1989.

Peterman faced Welch again four years later, when the Times called him the "quintessential Attractive Young Candidate of the '90s." During the campaign, he had expressed confidence that he would make a better showing and that he felt the voters were ready for his ""fresh perspective." He had criticized Welch for not doing enough to bring economic development to the district and matching needs to resources. He listed his priorities as economic development, crime and safe, affordable housing. The St. Petersburg Times recommended Peterman over Welch in the 1997 election. The Times praised both candidates for running positive, issue-based campaigns and for their ability to serve the community however, they felt Peterman could better continue the work began by Welch, building bridges to alienated African-American voters and bringing economic development to the district. Peterman won about twice as many votes as Welch in the primary in February 1997. The third contestant, Thomas R. Cuba, an environmental consultant, garnered only about 10% of the vote and was eliminated. In March, he went on to again defeat Welch by a large margin in the general election. That year, Jet magazine reported that Peterman was the youngest person to serve on the St. Petersburg City Council.

== State House 55 ==
Peterman became the second Democrat to file to run for State House District 55 for the 2000 election, against Earnest Williams and incumbent Republican Representative Rudy Bradley. At the time, he said he sought to advocate for public schools, minorities, and the poor. Bradley felt he could better serve the residents of District 55 because he had switched to the Republican Party, which controlled the Legislature and the Governorship, and would be better connected with those in power. He was at the time unique as the only Black Republican in the Florida Legislature, and considered resigning his house seat to run for the Florida Senate. He eventually did so, leaving Peterman and Williams to contend for the House seat. No Republican filed to run, so the primary was open to all voters. Thirty two years after his father's unsuccessful State House bid, Peterman was elected to Florida House of Representatives District 55.

In April 2001, Peterman sponsored a school prayer bill that would permit non sectarian prayer at non compulsory events. In 2002, the Florida League of Conservation Voters ranked Peterman number 6 out of 120 legislators. Peterman and his mother were ordained at Bethel Community Baptist Church. He ran for re-election opposed by Republican Vincent K. Hopkins and Libertarian Party Thomas William Kilmon. Peterman's platform included economic development, better pay for teachers, small businesses financial and technical assistance, and support for an amendment to limit class sizes. He would have paid for the additional teachers required by such an amendment by closing sales tax exemptions. He also favored single-member school board districts and protection for migrant workers from exploitation. Hopkins had been a friend of Peterman's when they were children and claimed Marion Barry as his mentor.

In June 2002, Peterman was ordained as a minister and became the pastor of the Rock of Jesus Missionary Baptist Church with his mother as assistant pastor in February 2003. Both had been associate pastors at Bethel Community Baptist Church, where they were ordained. He was quoted as saying the focus of his ministry would be "evangelization and outreach." He also said he would be able to balance his ministry with his family life and his work as a legislator and as a director for Juvenile Services Program Inc. Almost immediately, Peterman was criticized by Bill Maxwell, a columnist for the St. Petersburg Times for accepting and then giving up a position on the education appropriations committee. Peterman said felt he could not give the job the required attention because it would take time away from his family and ministry. After turning down the position, he had been quoted as saying, "'"God and family have to come first.'" In March, he sponsored a bill to protect migrant farm workers from exploitation in the form of pesticide exposure and denial of a minimum wage. Both African-American Democrats and Cuban- American Republicans found common cause in supporting the measure. He also sought to re-instate the expired Florida Agricultural Worker Safety Act. In October 2003, Peterman supported HB 35E (Terri's Law), which authorized Governor Bush to order the re-insertion of a feeding tube under the specific set of circumstances in the Terri Schiavo case.

Peterman was one of several elected officials to win re-election by default when no opponent had filed by the deadline for qualification. Peterman maintained his earlier position when the Terri Schiavo case was revisited in 2005. The Florida House again passed a bill to prevent the removal of Schaivo's feeding tube. Peterman and Arthenia Joyner were two of the few Democrats who supported the bill. Most Republicans in the House had voted for it. Everett Rice and Leslie Waters were two Pinellas Republican representatives who voted against it. Waters was quoted as saying "'Terri's family, Terri's doctors and clergy know best. Not people who have never met her.'" That same year, the Legislature passed a stand-your-ground law that had been strongly supported by the National Rifle Association. The law removed the a person's "'duty to retreat'" when attacked in a place outside the home they had a legal right to be, giving the individual "'the right to stand his or her ground and meet force with force, including deadly force if he or she reasonably believes it is necessary to do so, to prevent death or great bodily harm to himself or herself or another.'" Peterman was one of twenty state representatives, and the only Tampa Bay Area representative aside from Joyner, to oppose the bill, saying it would create a confrontational "open season."

In February 2005, State Senator Les Miller had announced his intent to run for Florida Congressional district 11 to replace Jim Davis, who was running for Governor. In turn, Peterman and fellow Democrat Arthenia Joyner announced their intentions to run for the seat vacated by Miller. In September, Joyner appeared to be the stronger of the two, and Peterman decided against running against her, deciding to run instead for re-election to the District 55 house seat.

Peterman was endorsed in June 2006 by the Pinellas County Council of Fire Fighters. In July, he again became one of 55 legislators to automatically win unopposed when the filing date passed without an opponent filing to run against him. In 2007, Peterman supported renewal of the Pinellas County Local Option Sales Tax. He advocated retiring or changing the words to Florida's state song, "Old Folks at Home." The song had become controversial as a reminder of the slavery era and as demeaning to African Americans. He supported a substantial payment by the State of Florida to the family of Martin Lee Anderson. They had sued the Department of Juvenile Justice after the fourteen-year-old died while being beaten by guards at a DJJ boot camp in Bay County, Florida. Following the acquittal of the seven guards and the nurse accused of aggravated manslaughter in the case, Peterman said that "'people who believe in justice,'" should protest the verdict with an economic boycott of Bay County.

== Beyond the State House ==
He became a member of Barack Obama's Florida Advisory Council in the summer of 2007. Peterman became the third Democrat to be appointed by Governor Christ to lead a state agency when he was appointed on February 8, 2008 to head the Department of Juvenile Justice. Due to term limits, he would have been ineligible to run again for the House. He replaced Walter A. McNeil, who had been appointed Secretary of the Department of Corrections. Peterman said it was important to seek rehabilitation of youthful offenders and to avoid their incarceration. His prior experience with Juvenile Services Program Inc served him in preparing for the position, as did his service on the House Juvenile Justice Committee. In 2005, he sponsored a bill to create the Council on the Social Status of African-American Men and Boys. He said he would accomplish his goals by such measures as authorizing local review boards and councils to redirect first-time offenders to community-based punishments. He also pledged to staff all detention centers with registered nurses and make sure public defenders were provided to children at their first hearings. In accepting the position, he was required to resign from JSP. In August 2008, he fired twelve juvenile detention officers accused of using a state computer to watch pornography, while asserting that no children had seen the pornography.

In 2009, Peterman came under fire for using state tax dollars to travel to and from his home in St. Petersburg and not being in his office in Tallahassee on a routine basis. After an independent investigation by the governor's office, he was later ordered to pay back more than $25,000 of $44,000 to the state. Critics said he should have been fired, as he conducted the personal travel with intent. Under more pressure later, in 2010, he gave up his state vehicle that he had used for personal travel. In 2009, a complaint was filed on the same matter to the Florida Commission on Ethics, alleging Peterman violated the state law under the provisions of "misuse of public position". In 2010, the Ethics Commission found probable cause to investigate. Peterman remains adamant that his commitment to his ministry and family were top priority and led to his split time between the cities as he did not wish to uproot his wife and children.

Peterman is currently the founder and CEO of Peterman Global, LLC, a business and political consultation company. He continues to pastor at the Rock of Jesus Missionary Baptist Church and has recently re-entered politics, running for the Pinellas County Commission, District 7. Commissioner Ken Welch, the son of former councilman David Welch, vacated the seat in pursuit of a mayoral bid in 2021.
