= Tom Lee (Florida politician) =

American politician

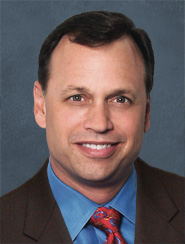

President of the Florida Senate
- In office November 16, 2004 – November 21, 2006
- Preceded by: Jim King
- Succeeded by: Ken Pruitt

Member of the Florida Senate
- In office November 6, 2012 – November 3, 2020
- Preceded by: Redistricted
- Succeeded by: Danny Burgess
- Constituency: 24th district (2012–2016); 20th district (2016–2020)
- In office November 5, 1996 – November 7, 2006
- Preceded by: Malcolm Beard
- Succeeded by: Ronda Storms
- Constituency: 23rd district (1996–2002); 10th district (2002–2006)

Personal details
- Born: January 21, 1962 (age 64) San Antonio, Texas, U.S.
- Party: Republican
- Spouse: Laurel Lee
- Children: 3
- Education: Hillsborough Community College (AA); University of Tampa (BS)

Tom Lee (born January 21, 1962) is an American Republican politician from Florida. He represented parts of the Tampa area in the Florida Senate from 1996 to 2006, and again from 2012 to 2020. He served as Senate President from 2004 to 2006. He was the Republican nominee for Chief Financial Officer of Florida in 2006, but lost to Democratic nominee Alex Sink.

== History ==
Lee was born in San Antonio, Texas, and moved to Florida in 1969. He attended Hillsborough Community College, graduating with his associate degree in 1982, and then attended the University of Tampa, receiving a degree in business in 1984. Following graduation, he began working for Sabal Homes of Florida, eventually becoming their Vice-President and Director, a position that he currently maintains.

== Florida Senate ==
In 1996, when State Senator Malcolm Beard did not seek re-election, Lee ran to succeed him in the 23rd District, which included parts of Hillsborough County and Polk County. He faced Mark Proctor and Betty Jo Tompkins in the Republican primary, and though he placed first with 48% of the vote to Proctor's 30% and Tompkins's 22%, he did not win a majority, and a runoff election was held. Lee ended up defeating Proctor by a landslide in the runoff election, receiving 63% of the vote to Proctor's 37%. He faced John Dicks, the Democratic nominee, whom he defeated in a landslide with 61% of the vote.

Lee was re-elected without opposition in 2000. In 2002, following the redrawing of the state's legislative districts, he was moved into the 10th District, which included most of the territory that he had previously represented, but added an incursion into Pasco County, and was re-elected to his final term unopposed. For the 2004 to 2006 legislative term, Lee was elected by his colleagues to serve as the President of the Florida Senate.

== Chief Financial Officer campaign ==
When Tom Gallagher, the Chief Financial Officer of Florida, opted to run for Governor of Florida in 2006 rather than seek re-election, Lee, who could not seek another term in the legislature due to term limits, ran to succeed him. He faced State Representative Randy Johnson and Milton V. Bauguess in the Republican primary, and he received endorsements from then-Governor Jeb Bush and then-Lieutenant Governor Toni Jennings. Despite the fact that Bush and Lee had a frequently contentious relationship, Bush praised Lee for the leadership qualities that he would bring to the office, noting, "I think it's important to have leadership in the executive branch of Tallahassee. The right kind of Republican leadership is very important." During the campaign, Lee and Johnson exchanged attacks over each other's willingness to accept campaign contributions from industries that they would regulate if elected, including the insurance industry. Lee declared, "I have proven time and time again over a decade of being in the Senate that I can stand independent of my contributors on issues that are important to the consumers of Florida," while noting, "Let's just say, in a variety of ways, [Johnson's] campaign is taking great liberties with the truth, particularly with his so-called commitment not to take insurance money." Ultimately, Lee won out over his opponents by a wide margin, receiving 57% of the vote to Johnson's 37% and Bauguess' 6%, and advanced to the general election, where he faced Alex Sink, the Democratic nominee. Sink attacked him for failing to properly address property insurance during his time in the legislature and managed to rack up endorsements from a majority of the newspapers in the state, including the Florida Times-Union, which praised Sink for exceeding the qualifications for the job, while criticizing Lee for failing to meet them. In the final days of the campaign, polling showed that Lee held a 39-38% lead over Sink, which her campaign noted had narrowed from an earlier six point margin. Despite the close campaign, however, Lee ended up losing to Sink, receiving 46% of the vote to her 54%.

== Return to the Florida Senate ==
When incumbent State Senator Ronda Storms, who succeeded Lee when he first left the legislature in 2006, declined to seek re-election in 2012, Lee ran to succeed her in the 24th District, which contained most of the territory that he had represented during his previous legislative service. He faced State Representative Rachel Burgin in the Republican primary, and a divisive election occurred, with a group allied with Burgin comparing Lee to Hillsborough County Property Appraiser Rob Turner, who was "embroiled in a porn scandal" in advertisements that were condemned by the Republican Party of Florida. Lee ended up comfortably defeating Burgin, receiving 59% of the vote to her 41% of the vote. Advancing to the general election, Lee faced Elizabeth Belcher, a retired Internal Revenue Service investigator and the Democratic nominee. He earned the endorsements of the Tampa Bay Times, which called him a "reasonable voice in the Florida Senate," and The Tampa Tribune, which praised him as a "consistent supporter of thoughtful tax cuts." Lee ended up defeating Belcher to return to the Florida Senate, scoring 54% of the vote to her 46%.

After court-ordered redistricting in 2016, Lee's district was renumbered and reconfigured to encompass northeastern Hillsborough, southeastern Pasco County, and northwestern Polk County.

On May 29, 2020, Lee announced he would resign from the Senate effective November 3, 2020 while he considers running for local office. He initially decided to run for Hillsborough County clerk of court, but opted not to run a few days later.

Florida Senate
Preceded by Malcolm Beard	Member of the Florida Senate from the 23rd district 1996–2002	Succeeded by Lisa Carlton
Preceded by Ginny Brown-Waite	Member of the Florida Senate from the 10th district 2002–2006	Succeeded by Ronda Storms
Preceded by Thad Altman	Member of the Florida Senate from the 24th district 2012–2016	Succeeded by Jeff Brandes
Preceded by Jack Latvala	Member of the Florida Senate from the 20th district 2016–2020	Succeeded by Danny Burgess
Political offices
Preceded by Jim King	President of the Florida Senate; 2004–2006	Succeeded by Ken Pruitt
Party political offices
Preceded by Tom Gallagher	Republican nominee for Chief Financial Officer of Florida; 2006	Succeeded by Jeff Atwater
