= Sandra Murman =

American politician

Sandra L. "Sandy" Murman
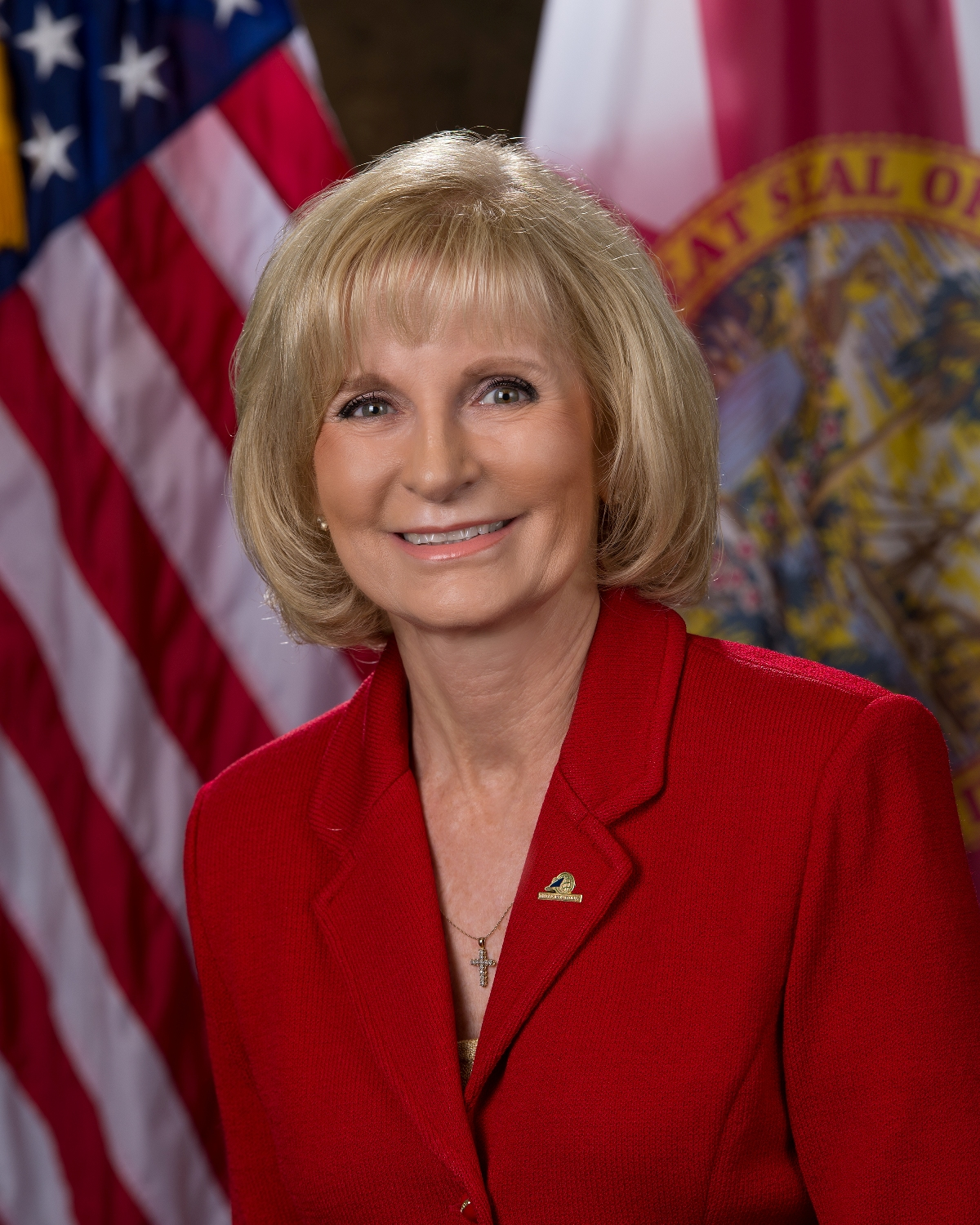

Member of the Hillsborough County Commission from the 1st district
- In office November 16, 2010 – November 17, 2020
- Preceded by: Rose Ferlita
- Succeeded by: Harry Cohen

Speaker Pro Tempore of the Florida House of Representatives
- In office November 21, 2000 – November 19, 2002
- Preceded by: Dennis Jones
- Succeeded by: Lindsay Harrington

Member of the Florida House of Representatives from the 56th district
- In office November 19, 1996 – November 16, 2004
- Preceded by: Jim Davis
- Succeeded by: Trey Traviesa

Personal details
- Born: August 9, 1950 (age 76) Indianapolis, Indiana, U.S.
- Party: Republican (1997–present)
- Other political affiliations: Democratic (until 1997)
- Spouse: James A. "Jim" Murman
- Children: 1
- Education: Indiana University Bloomington (BS)

Sandra L. "Sandy" Murman (born August 9, 1950) is a former Republican member of the Florida House of Representatives. She was first elected as a Democrat in 1996, but switched parties in 1997. In 2006, Murman ran for the Florida Senate. However, she lost the Republican primary to Ronda Storms. Murman was elected to the Hillsborough County Commission in 2010, representing District 1. In 2020, Murman ran for District 6, but she lost to Pat Kemp.

Florida House of Representatives
Preceded by Jim Davis	Member of the Florida House of Representatives from the 56th district 1996–2004	Succeeded by Trey Traviesa
Political offices
Preceded by Rose Ferlita	Member of the Hillsborough County Commission from the 1st district 2010–2020	Succeeded by Harry Cohen
