= Guy Spicola =

American politician

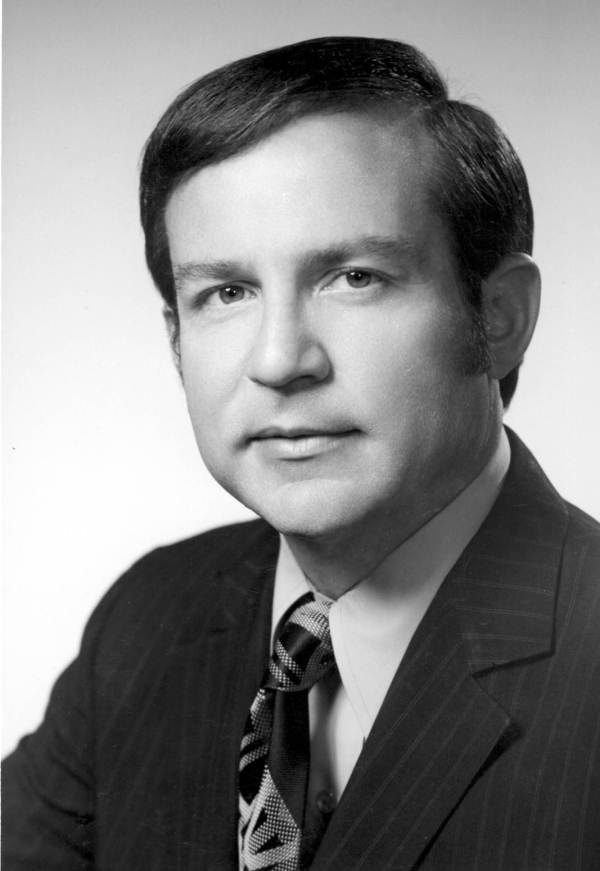

Judge of the Thirteenth Judicial Circuit Court of Florida
- In office January 9, 1980 – 1997; Chief Judge: 1985-1988
- Appointed by: Bob Graham

Member of the Florida Senate from the 22nd district
- In office November 19, 1974 – November 21, 1978
- Preceded by: Louis de la Parte
- Succeeded by: Malcolm Beard

Member of the Florida House of Representatives
- In office November 15, 1966 – November 19, 1974
- Preceded by: multi-member district
- Succeeded by: George Sheldon
- Constituency: Hillsborough County (1966-1967); 64th district (1967-1969); 62nd district (1971); 69th district (1973-1974)

City Prosecutor of Temple Terrace, Florida
- In office 1963–1965
- Mayor: George W. Fee

Personal details
- Born: Guy William Spicola; February 27, 1938 (age 88) Tampa, Florida
- Party: Republican; Democratic (until late 1970s)
- Spouse: Georgie
- Children: Brandon and Courtney
- Education: University of Florida (BA, JD)
- Occupation: lawyer

Guy William "Butch" Spicola (born February 27, 1938) is an American lawyer, former judge and former politician from Florida.

== Biography ==
Spicola was born in Tampa. An attorney, he attended the University of Florida, earning a Bachelor of Arts degree in 1960 and a Bachelor of Laws degree in 1962. From 1963 to 1965 he served as the City Prosecutor for Temple Terrace, Florida under Mayor George Fee.

In 1966, he was elected to the Florida House of Representatives for the 64th district. He was redistricted to the 62nd district in 1971, and the 69th district in 1973. He was elected to the State Senate for the 22nd district in 1974 and served until 1979. He was a member of the Democratic Party until the late 1970s when he switched to the Republican Party. He also served for the 36th district where he succeeded John R. Culbreath.

He was appointed a Circuit Judge in 1980 and served until 1997 when he became a partner in the law firm of Holland & Knight until 2002 when he opened his own practice in Tampa.

He is married to Georgie Blevens and they have two children.
