= Patricia Bailey =

Patricia Bailey may refer to:

- Patricia Bailey (Illinois politician) (fl. 2000s), former member of the Illinois House of Representatives
- Patricia Bailey-Snook (1936–2011), former member of the Florida House of Representatives
