= Mary Brennan (Florida politician) =

American politician (born 1954)

Member of the Florida House of Representatives
- In office November 6, 1990 – November 3, 1998
- Preceded by: Jim Frishe
- Succeeded by: Leslie Waters
- Constituency: 57th district (1990–1992); 51st district (1992–1998)

Personal details
- Born: May 17, 1954 (age 72) Valparaiso, Florida
- Party: Democratic
- Education: University of Florida (B.S.)

Mary Brennan (born May 17, 1954) is a Democratic politician from Florida who served as a member of the Florida House of Representatives from 1990 to 1998.

== Early life ==
Brennan was born in Valparaiso, Florida, in 1954, and grew up in Pinellas County, graduating from Largo High School in 1972. She attended the University of Florida, graduating with her bachelor's degree in journalism in 1976. Brennan was a newspaper reporter in Pinellas Park, and served as a legislative aide to State Representative Patricia Bailey. After Bailey left the legislature, Brennan served as the public information officer for the city of Pinellas Park.

== Florida House of Representatives ==
In 1988, Brennan ran for the 57th district, challenging Republican State Representative Jim Frishe. She attacked Frishe as ineffective in the legislature, and won the endorsement of the Tampa Tribune, which argued that "Frishe hasn't backed up his ideas with hard work" and "grew complacent," while Brennan had "a willingness to work." Frishe defeated Brennan by a wide margin, winning 58 percent of the vote to her 42 percent.

Brennan ran for the legislature again in 1990. She won the Democratic primary over teacher Frank Harding with 72 percent of the vote, and advanced to the general election, where she faced Frishe. Brennan defeated Frishe in their rematch, winning 56 percent of the vote to his 44 percent.

Following redistricting in 1992, Brennan ran for re-election in the 51st district. She was challenged by Republican Richard Butler, an insurance agency owner, whom she defeated with 56 percent of the vote.

In 1994, Brennan was challenged by Republican Carl Newman, an insurance agent. During the campaign, Brennan publicly stated her support for gay marriage at a political forum, noting that she opposed discrimination. Neuman, in turn, attacked her for her liberal views. She ultimately defeated Neuman with 54 percent of the vote.

Brennan ran for a fourth term in 1996, and was challenged by St. Petersburg Junior College instructor Paul Crumrine, who had previously run for the legislature in a different district as a Libertarian candidate in 1994. Brennan defeated Crumrine in a landslide, winning 65 percent of the vote to his 35 percent.

== 1998 State Senate campaign ==
In 1998, Republican State Senator Charlie Crist opted to run for the U.S. Senate rather than seek re-election, and Brennan ran to succeed him in the 20th district. She faced David Eaton, a former traffic hearing officer, in the Democratic primary, whom she defeated by a wide margin, winning 75 percent of the vote. In the general election, she ran against the Republican nominee, Jim Sebesta, the former Hillsborough County Supervisor of Elections. Sebesta narrowly defeated her, winning 52 percent of the vote to her 48 percent.

== Post-legislative career ==
After leaving the legislature, Brennan was hired by the Louis de la Carte Mental Health Institute at the University of South Florida as a public relations administrator. In 2000, Brennan announced that she would run against Republican State Representative Leslie Waters, who succeeded her in the State House. Shortly after launching her campaign, she was fired by USF. Waters defeated Brennan, winning 54 percent of the vote to Brennan's 46 percent.

In 2008, Brennan ran to succeed her old boss, Patricia Bailey-Snook, on the Pinellas Park City Council. She was narrowly defeated by Jerry Mullins.
