= Bob Gualtieri =

American law enforcement officer

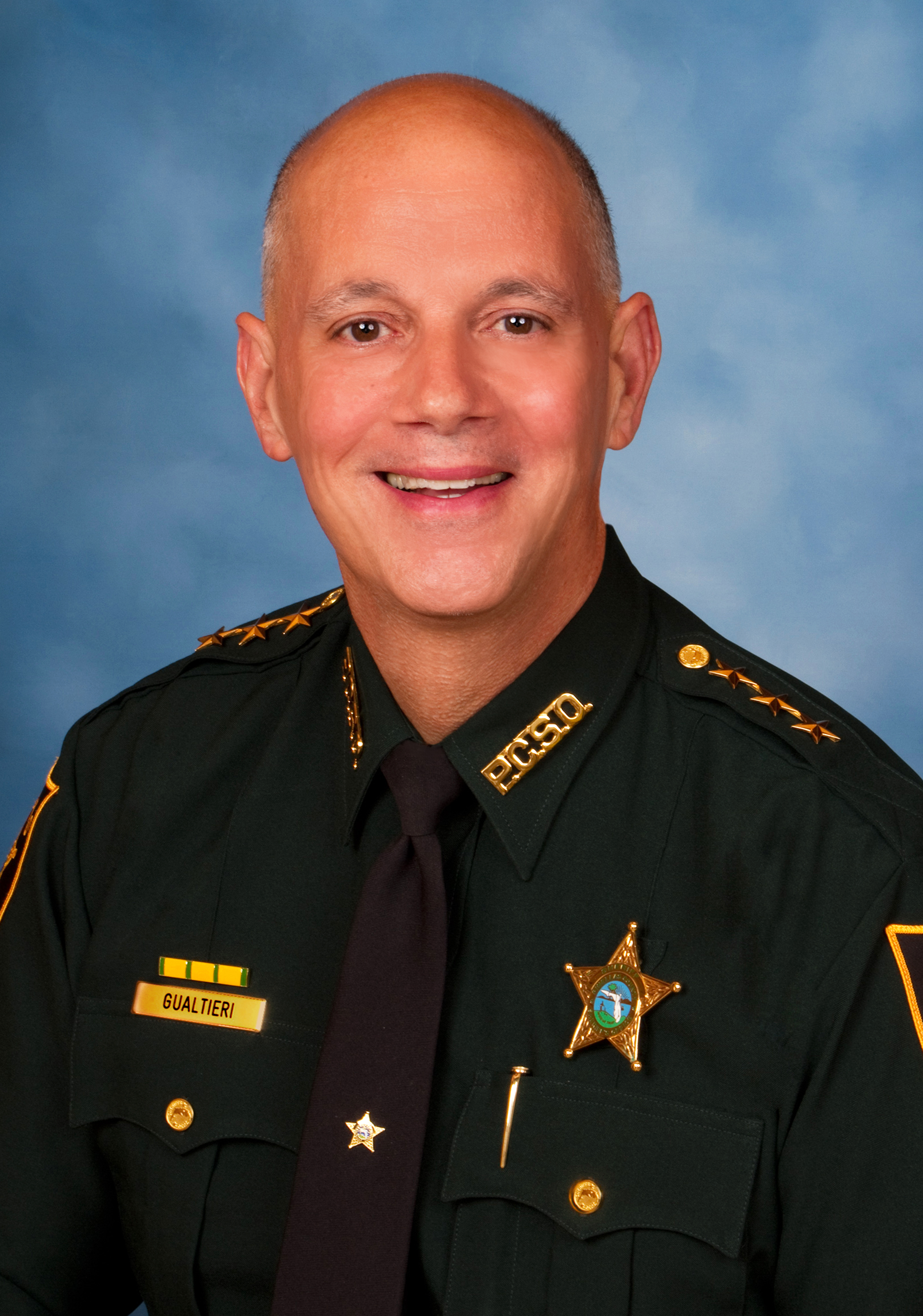
- Gualtieri in 2014

Chair of the Marjory Stoneman Douglas High School Public Safety Commission
- Incumbent
- Assumed office March 20, 2018
- Appointed by: Richard Corcoran
- Preceded by: Position established

15th Sheriff of Pinellas County
- Incumbent
- Assumed office November 9, 2011
- Appointed by: Rick Scott
- Preceded by: Jim Coats

Personal details
- Born: October 2, 1961 (age 65) Syracuse, New York, U.S.
- Party: Republican
- Spouse(s): First wife (div. 1995) Lauralee Westine (m. 1998)
- Children: 3
- Education: Eckerd College (BA); Stetson University (JD)

Robert A. Gualtieri (born October 2, 1961) is an American law enforcement officer, lawyer, and politician who is serving as the 15th (Note: Gualtieri is the 14th individual to hold the position. Roy Booth served two non-consecutive terms between 1925 and 1929 and 1930 to 1933; therefore Booth was the 4th and 6th sheriff.) sheriff of Pinellas County, Florida. He previously served as chief deputy and general counsel to PCSO under Sheriff Jim Coats. Gualtieri was appointed sheriff by Governor Rick Scott in 2011 to succeed Coats. Gualtieri was elected to the office in his own right in 2012, and was re-elected in 2016, 2020 and 2024. He is a member of the Republican Party.

In March 2018, House Speaker Richard Corcoran appointed Gualtieri to the Marjory Stoneman Douglas High School Public Safety Commission, and Governor Scott named him chairman. In 2019, the National Sheriffs' Association named Gualtieri the Ferris E. Lucas Sheriff of the Year. Gualtieri was also the elected president of the Florida Sheriffs Association for 2019–2020. Gualtieri also serves as the treasurer for the Major County Sheriffs of America.

== Early life and law enforcement career ==
Gualtieri was born on October 2, 1961, in Syracuse, New York, to Linda and Frank Gualtieri. His father served as district attorney in Onondaga County.

He moved to Florida with his parents in 1980.

In 1982, Gualtieri was hired by the Pinellas County Sheriff's Office as a detention deputy for the county jail. In 1983, he joined the Dunedin Police Department as a patrol officer. He rejoined the Sheriff's Office in 1984 as a patrol deputy and later as a detective assigned to drug investigations. He continued to work for PCSO until 1998.

== Education and private practice ==
Gualtieri attended Eckerd College and earned a B.A. in American Studies. After leaving the Sheriff's Office in 1998, he attended Stetson University College of Law, where he earned a J.D. in 2002. From 2003 to 2006, he worked as an attorney for Ford Harrison, a national labor law firm with an office in Tampa.

== General counsel and chief deputy for PCSO ==
In 2006, Gualtieri accepted an offer from Sheriff Jim Coats to return to the Sheriff's Office as general counsel. He was appointed chief deputy in 2008, a role that saw him in charge of day-to-day operations. He continued to serve in both roles until his appointment as sheriff in 2011.

As chief deputy, Gualtieri cut the department's budget; from 2008 to 2012 it shrank from $278 million to $206 million. He also helped open Pinellas Safe Harbor, an emergency/homeless shelter and diversion program next to the county jail.

== Sheriff of Pinellas County ==
On May 17, 2011, Sheriff Coats announced he would not seek re-election in 2012. Gualtieri filed to run for sheriff the same day, and formally announced his candidacy two days later. On August 25, Coats announced he would retire on November 7.

=== Appointment ===
On October 7, 2011, Florida Governor Rick Scott announced his appointment of Gualtieri as interim sheriff of Pinellas County. On November 9, Gualtieri took the oath of office from Sixth Circuit Chief Judge J. Thomas McGrady at the Pinellas County Criminal Justice Center in Clearwater. Gualtieri would serve the remainder of Coats' term, which was set to expire on January 7, 2013.

=== Elections ===
==== 2012 ====
Gualtieri faced a notable Republican primary challenge from former Pinellas Sheriff Everett Rice, who had served from 1989 to 2004. Other candidates who sought to unseat Gualtieri included Republican Tim Ingold, who later dropped out and supported Rice; Democrats Scott Swope, Randy Heine, and Stephen W. Reilly; and write-in candidate Greg Pound. Gualtieri was endorsed by his predecessor, Jim Coats, who succeeded Rice. In the August 14 Republican primary, Gualtieri defeated Rice 57% to 42%. Gualtieri then faced Democrat Swope and write-in Pound in the general election. Gualtieri won his first full term on November 6, as he defeated Swope 59% to 40%.

2012 Pinellas County sheriff Republican primary
| Party | Candidate | Votes | % |
|---|---|---|---|
| Republican | Bob Gualtieri (incumbent) | 41,239 | 57.35 |
| Republican | Everett Rice | 30,666 | 42.65 |
| Total votes | | 71,905 | 100 |

2012 Pinellas County sheriff general election
| Party | Candidate | Votes | % |
|---|---|---|---|
| Republican | Bob Gualtieri (incumbent) | 259,914 | 59.13 |
| Democratic | Scott Swope | 178,310 | 40.56 |
| Write-in | Write-ins (other) | 1,373 | 0.31 |
| Total votes | | 439,597 | 100 |

==== 2016 ====
Gualtieri qualified for the Republican nomination as he sought his second full term. Republican Josh Black announced a challenge to Gualtieri, but neither he nor Democrat Paul Congemi qualified on the ballot. Gualtieri's general election challengers were Independent James McLynas and write-in Greg Pound, the latter having previously run against Gualtieri in 2012. Gualtieri defeated McLynas 76% to 22% in his November 8 re-election.

2016 Pinellas County sheriff general election
| Party | Candidate | Votes | % |
|---|---|---|---|
| Republican | Bob Gualtieri (incumbent) | 345,283 | 76.89 |
| Independent | James McLynas | 101,230 | 22.54 |
| Write-in | Write-ins (other) | 2,530 | 0.56 |
| Total votes | | 449,043 | 100 |

==== 2020 ====
On January 2, Gualtieri filed for reelection to a third full term. His Democratic opponents were James McLynas, who previously ran under NPA against Gualtieri in 2016; and Eliseo Santana, an unsuccessful candidate for Pinellas School Board and Clearwater City Council, in 2016 and 2020 respectively.

In May, the Working Families Party publicly denounced Gualtieri, claiming the community is not safe under his leadership, and launched a campaign seeking a resident to step up and challenge him in the November election. The WFP ultimately endorsed Eliseo Santana.

Gualtieri participated in the first sheriff's forum of the 2020 election, hosted by Dream Defenders, on June 17. He spoke alone in the first hour, while McLynas and Santana shared the second hour together. When questioned why he would not debate his challengers, Gualtieri acknowledged that he refused to debate McLynas over a series of photoshopped pictures and memes criticizing him.

As Gualtieri had no Republican opposition, he automatically secured his party's nomination. Santana defeated McLynas in the Democratic primary, and will face Gualtieri in the general election on November 3. Following the primary, Daniel Nichanian of The Appeal called the Gualtieri-Santana matchup "the state's most consequential county-level election". On September 10, Gualtieri and Santana participated in a forum hosted by the League of Women Voters of St. Petersburg.

2020 Pinellas County sheriff general election
| Party | Candidate | Votes | % |
|---|---|---|---|
| Republican | Bob Gualtieri (incumbent) | 343,567 | 62.55 |
| Democratic | Eliseo Santana | 205,735 | 37.45 |
| Total votes | | 549,302 | 100 |

==== 2024 ====
Gualtieri ran unopposed in both the primary and general elections. His name was not on the ballots because of this. He won both elections automatically.

=== Policy positions ===
==== Body cameras ====
Although the PCSO uses dashcams in most of their vehicles, Gualtieri opposes the implementation of a body camera program in Pinellas. As of 2019, there were 24 Florida sheriff's offices that regulated body cameras. However as of 2022, PCSO utilizes the Axon Body Cameras for all law enforcement deputies, in addition to Axon Fleet Cameras for departmental vehicles.

==== Cannabis ====
Gualtieri actively campaigned in opposition to Florida Amendment 2 in 2014, which would have legalized medical cannabis in the state; he argued that the amendment was crafted to push for the legalization of recreational use. In 2015, he had expressed support for a medical cannabis bill introduced by Republican state senator Jeff Brandes; however, he voted against it as a member of the Florida Sheriffs Association.

With the statewide legalization of hemp in 2019, Gualtieri acknowledged complications when it comes to making marijuana prosecutions. In October, Gualtieri and State Attorney Bernie McCabe issued a memo to caution deputies how to deal with individual cases.

==== Surveillance ====
Gualtieri has expanded the use of the Face Analysis Comparison & Examination System (FACES), which PCSO began in 2001. As of 2019, FACES is accessed by 273 partner agencies, including 17 federal agencies such as the Federal Bureau of Investigation; U.S. Immigration and Customs Enforcement; and Internal Revenue Service. According to a 2016 study by Georgetown University Law Center, it contains up to 33 million faces, including 22 million Florida driver's license/ID photos and over 11 million law enforcement photos. When asked if the PCSO conducts audits for misuse, Gualtieri replied, "No, not really." The network has faced criticism and concerns over lack of transparency, privacy concerns and abuse. In 2019, the agency reportedly requested services for a vendor to provide "real-time facial searching capabilities from live surveillance cameras". However, a spokesperson claimed this was added to the RFI inadvertently and that Gualtieri was opposed to real-time facial recognition.

=== Hurricane Irma ===
During preparations for Hurricane Irma in September 2017, Gualtieri warned Pinellas residents facing mandatory evacuations that while it is a crime not to evacuate, he would not send his deputies to arrest people from their homes. He also stated he did not plan to arrest people with warrants if they showed up at emergency shelters. Gualtieri stressed that his office would not respond to emergency calls during the hurricane. On the afternoon of September 9, Gualtieri suspended visitation at the county jail, as they began to evacuate inmates. By the evening of September 10, the rain and winds from the storm forced Gualtieri to pull his deputies from the roads. Pinellas temporarily closed their borders when the hurricane passed the county on September 11; residents were allowed to return to Pinellas by 9:30 a.m. and were allowed to return to the barrier islands by 4 p.m. Gualtieri subsequently suspended four deputies for neglecting their duties during the hurricane.

=== Stoneman Douglas High School Public Safety Commission ===
Following the Marjory Stoneman Douglas High School shooting in February 2018, Florida Governor Rick Scott appointed Gualtieri that year to serve as the chair of the MSDHS Public Safety Commission. The commission was asked to analyze information from the shooting and other Florida mass violence incidents, and to provide recommendations. The commission issued a 500-page report in January 2019. Among its recommendations were to provide assailant training for school personnel, bulletproof glass on classroom windows, and to arm teachers. Gualtieri, saying he would not recommend removing Broward County Sheriff Scott Israel from his office, said, "Just because your people are imperfect, or in some cases wrong, or in some cases negligent, or in some cases act improperly or engage in malfeasance or misfeasance like [former school resource deputy Scot] Peterson, that doesn’t mean the sheriff did. Peterson I would say had all the tools, had received the training and that was a situation where no matter what you did or what you gave that guy, he was just a coward who wasn’t going to act."

=== Markeis McGlockton shooting ===
On July 20, 2018, Gualtieri announced that his agency would not charge 47-year-old Michael Drejka for the shooting death of 28-year-old Markeis McGlockton in Clearwater the day before, in accordance with Florida's stand-your-ground law. In August, Gualtieri handed the investigation over to State Attorney Bernie McCabe for a final decision. Drejka was formally charged with a single count of manslaughter later that month. Drejka's trial was held a year later, and he was found guilty and sentenced to 20 years in prison.

Gualtieri's initial decision not to arrest Drejka sparked protests by community activists and received bipartisan criticism from Republicans and Democrats. The Pinellas chapter of the Green Party called for Gualtieri to resign. Civil rights activist Al Sharpton made a stop at a Clearwater church, calling for Gualtieri to "lock him (Drejka) up, or give up your badge." Gualtieri reacted to this statement by suggesting Sharpton "go back to New York. Mind your own business."

In December 2019, Daniel Nichanian of The Appeal wrote that Gualtieri's record would be on the 2020 ballot, citing the McGlockton case.

=== COVID-19 pandemic ===
==== Arrests and jail conditions ====
Gualtieri reportedly sent an email to police chiefs on March 16, cautioning them to use "good judgment and decision-making" when determining whether to make an arrest, as the jail struggled with overcrowding during the COVID-19 pandemic. Since March 16, the PCSO had reportedly arrested fewer than 70 people a day, down from an average of 130–140 before the pandemic. However, James McLynas noted that the PCSO continued to make more arrests over minor non-violent offenses in the following days. Tampa Bay Dream Defenders created an online petition directed to Pinellas and Hillsborough County, to "urge the State Attorney's Offices, the Sixth and Thirteenth Judicial Circuits, the Pinellas and Hillsborough Department of Corrections and police departments across Pinellas and Hillsborough Counties to immediately release all people who are currently incarcerated on bondable offenses from jail and to stop adding new people to the jail population." Gualtieri was opposed to a mass release of inmates as his first option.

In a Tampa Bay Times article published on March 17, Gualtieri asserted that "no inmates were in medical isolation or experiencing worrisome symptoms". It was also reported that about 220 inmates at the county jail were forced to sleep on the floor, as the Florida Department of Corrections temporarily suspended inmate transfers. (Note: The article noted that about 150 inmates sleep on rubber mats on the floor on a typical day.) By March 21, about 200 inmates were released "through the normal process", and the number of inmates who slept on the floor had been reduced to about 60. By March 23, about 500 inmates had been released and 40 were sleeping on the floor.

==== Impact on businesses and economy ====
On March 17, county officials announced that restaurants and other establishments in Pinellas must stop selling alcohol by 10 p.m., starting the following day. "This is about people gathering in massive groups," Gualtieri said. "This is a serious problem that requires a serious response."

At a joint news conference with Clearwater Police Chief Daniel Slaughter at Clearwater Beach's Pier 60 on March 21, Gualtieri thanked Pinellas citizens who were complying with orders to stay off county beaches. He criticized the national media for replaying a viral news clip of spring breakers packed on the beach earlier in the week, saying the problem did not reoccur in the following days, and criticized county leaders for caving in to pressure to shut down the beaches, claiming such a closure would be a challenge to patrol.

On March 26, Gualtieri led 200 deputies and officers by posting 14,000 "safer at home" orders on businesses, one day after county officials issued the "safer at home" directive. Tampa Bay Guardian, an independent online newspaper, called the event a "photo opportunity" and reported that Gualtieri violated the county order by improperly posting notices to make them visible outside the premise but not to those "present on the premises", as the order required.

== Politics ==
Gualtieri has been recognized by SaintPetersBlog/Florida Politics on their annual list of "Tampa Bay's 25 Most Powerful Politicians".

In the 2016 United States presidential election in Florida, Gualtieri voted for Donald Trump.

== Awards ==
- On May 1, 2018, Military Order of the World Wars Clearwater Chapter 136 awarded Gualtieri the National Exceptional Service Award.
- On April 16, 2019, the National Sheriffs' Association named him the Sheriff of the Year, out of 3,100 sheriffs.
- On July 26, 2019, Stetson Lawyers Alumni Association honored Gualtieri with the Distinguished Alumnus Award.
- On October 22, 2020, the Florida Sheriffs Association gave him the Police Executive Research Forum (PERF) Leadership Award.
- On February 2, 2023, Gualtieri was named 2022 Sheriff of the Year by Major County Sheriffs of America. He was chosen out of 110 other sheriffs who represented the largest sheriffs' offices.
- On December 9, 2025, the American Constitutional Rights Union (ACRU) gave Gualtieri the ACRU's Defender Award.

== See also ==
- Republican Party of Florida

Civic offices
| Preceded by Jim Coats | Sheriff of Pinellas County; 2011–present | Incumbent |
