= Redner =

Redner may refer to:

== People ==
- Arthur Redner, an American football coach and former player
- Ethel Redner Scull, an American art collector
- Joe Redner, owner of the Mons Venus
- Joey Redner, founder of Cigar City Brewing
- Lewis Redner, an American musician
- Nicolas Redner Bodington, a French WWII officer
- Sidney Redner, a Canadian physicist

== Other uses ==
- Redner's Markets, an American supermarket chain
