= Florida Taj Mahal scandal =

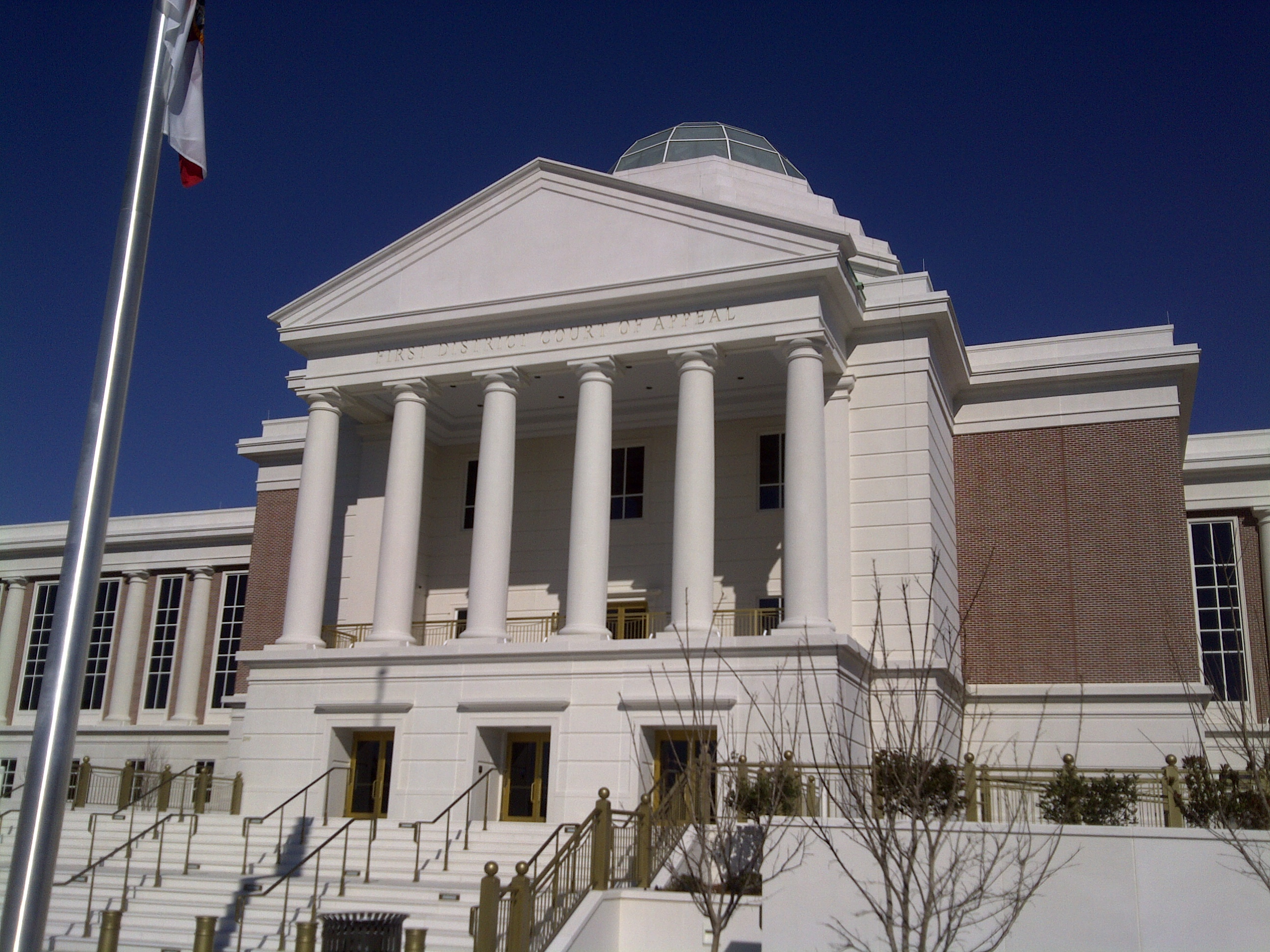
The "Taj Mahal" Courthouse (First DCA)

The Florida Taj Mahal scandal was an investigation by Chief Financial Officer of Florida Alex Sink (D) into excessive cost of the $48 million First District Court of Appeal of Florida courthouse located in Tallahassee, Florida.

In 2006, the judges of the First District Court of Appeal of Florida looked into having a new court house and rejected expanding and refurbishing the existing facility.

Reporter Lucy Morgan applied the term "Taj Mahal" to the courthouse project when breaking the story.

== Amenities ==
The courthouse was originally to have sumptuous chamber suites for every judge with each suite having 60-inch LCD flat screen televisions trimmed in mahogany as well as kitchen facilities with microwave ovens and refrigerators. They were to also have full private bath facilities with polished granite countertops. In addition, around twelve 40-46 inch flat screen TVs were slated to be spread throughout the courthouse. After the news of these items was released on August 9, 2010, by Lucy Morgan of the St. Petersburg Times, the flat screens were reduced to 4 located in common areas. The cost for the building is $425 per square foot.

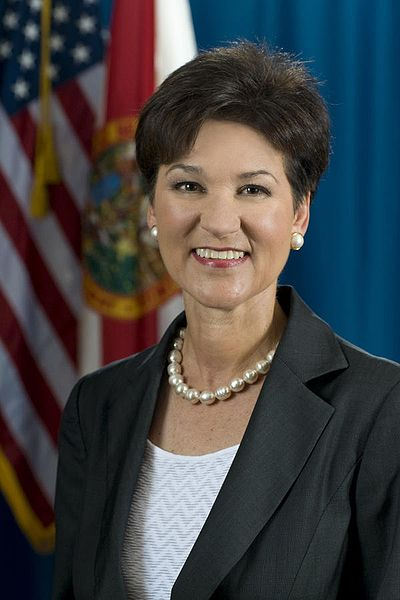
CFO Alex Sink

== Investigation ==
Following the St. Petersburg Times investigative story on August 9, 2010, CFO Sink ordered a preliminary review of documentation supporting payments for the project which found cause for an audit.

On August 30, 2010, Sink sent letters to the Florida Supreme Court and Florida's Department of Management Services that preliminary findings warranted an audit via her DFS, Bureau of Auditing for excessive spending on the First District Court of Appeal of Florida courthouse.

The CFO's office stated that money may have been misused and as much as $16 million may have been spent after a financial raid on the state's Workers' Compensation Trust Fund. A $30 million bond for construction was attached to a 142-page transportation bill and passed on the last day of the 2007 legislative session. The Florida budget commonly passes on the last day of session.

She (Sink) felt that the review raised more questions than answers. We want to reconcile and validate all the sources of funding for the project, including bond proceeds and other kinds of funding. One of the questions we have is why are portions of the contract with the general contractor and the project architect paid out of [the Department of Management Services] and other payments are made by the office of the state courts administrator?

— Jerri Franz, Press Secretary for Alex Sink

Sink ultimately never took any official action and the issue died after the campaign season.

== Response by 1st District Court of Appeal Judges ==
The Chief Judge in a letter sent to media outlets on September 27, 2010, stated:

- The courthouse project was not the result of a "backroom deal," but was the result of an approval process that spanned from 2005 to 2008, and included at least one public committee meeting. Chief Judge acknowledges that the bulk of the funding, some $33.5 million in bonds, was approved on the morning of the last day of the 2007 legislative session as a last-minute amendment to a transportation bill, but notes that the decision to bond the construction of the building had been made earlier in the year and as such should not have been a surprise.
- The granite countertops were selected for their long-term durability and low maintenance costs, and the televisions are actually monitors for the viewing of court procedures and documents. No cable/satellite connections are included in the construction plans.
- The project was followed closely by both House and Senate staff, as well as two governors. The cabinet was also required to approve bond measures. No concerns were ever raised.
- Costs exceeded initial estimates because of recent requirements by the legislature that the building meet LEED certification and possess state-of-the-art security. The completed courthouse was to become one of nine Gold-certified "green" buildings in the state.
- The St. Petersburg Times argued that the courthouse was both heavily lobbied for by a number of judges, as well as pushed through at the last minute. Both could not be true.
