= Louis de la Parte =

American politician

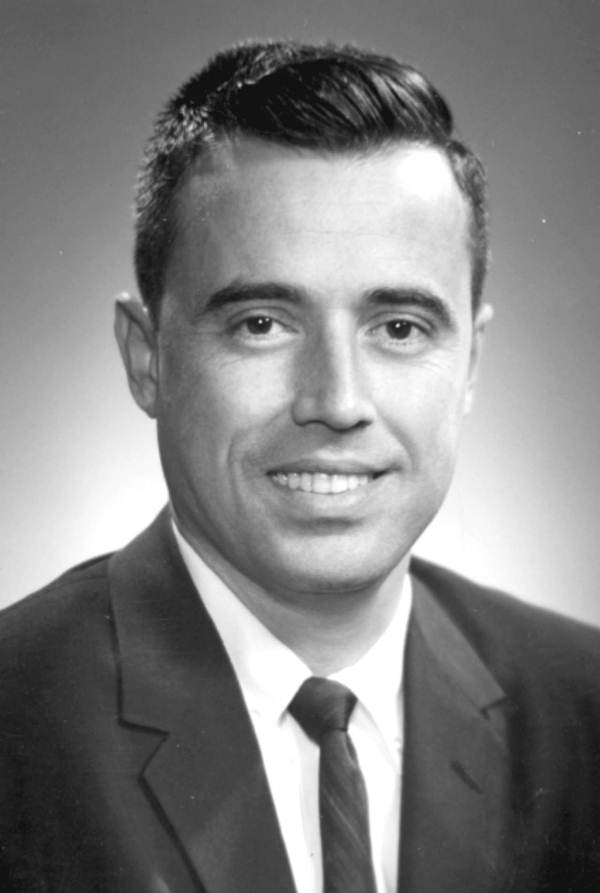

President of the Florida Senate
- In office July 1, 1974 – November 19, 1974
- Preceded by: Mallory Horne
- Succeeded by: Dempsey Barron

Member of the Florida Senate from the 22nd district 26th (1967-1972)
- In office November 8, 1966 – November 5, 1974
- Preceded by: Redistricted
- Succeeded by: Guy Spicola

Member of the Florida House of Representatives from Hillsborough County, Group 3
- In office November 6, 1962 – November 8, 1966
- Preceded by: Tom Whitaker Jr.
- Succeeded by: William M. Register Jr.

Personal details
- Born: Louis A. de la Parte Jr. July 27, 1929 Ybor City, Tampa, Florida, U.S.
- Died: September 28, 2008 (aged 79) Tampa, Florida, U.S.
- Party: Democratic
- Spouse: Helen

Louis A. de la Parte Jr. (July 27, 1929 – September 28, 2008) was an American politician who served for twelve years in the Florida Legislature. He was elected to the Florida House of Representatives in 1962 and served until his election to the Florida Senate in 1966. As president pro tempore, de la Parte became president of the Senate in July 1974 when the incumbent, Mallory Horne, resigned to run for the U.S. Senate. De la Parte did not preside over any legislative sessions, however, and retired from the Legislature when his term ended in November 1974. He died after battling Alzheimer's disease in 2008.

== Education ==
- Emory University, B.A., 1950
- University of Florida, LL.B., 1953
- University of Florida, J.D. 1967
