= Rudy Bradley =

American politician

Member of the Florida House of Representatives from the 55th district
- In office 1994–2000
- Preceded by: Doug Jamerson
- Succeeded by: Frank Peterman

Personal details
- Born: May 16, 1946 (age 80) St. Petersburg, Florida
- Party: Republican
- Education: University of Michigan, M.S.W., 1979; University of Tampa, B.S., 1969

Rudolph "Rudy" Bradley (born May 16, 1946) is a Florida politician. A Democrat turned Republican, he served in the Florida House of Representatives from 1994 to 2000, representing parts of Pinellas and Manatee Counties as the Representative for the 55th District.

== Early life ==
Bradley was born in St. Petersburg, Florida, in the Gas Plant neighborhood. He was the first black athlete at the University of Tampa, and earned a scholarship in 1966 before graduating in 1969. He earned a master's degree in social work.

He has four children, Adia, Ernest, Michael, and Andre.

== Career ==
He returned to St. Petersburg and was a social worker in Pinellas County Schools for more than 20 years.

Bradley was initially elected in a special election to replace Doug Jamerson after his appointment as Florida Commissioner of Education. In the Democratic primary, he came first in a five person race. He won the General Election with 71.9% of votes.

In his 1996 campaign, he was unopposed for reelection.

While in the House, Bradley sponsored a measure to create $3-million in college scholarships for minority teachers. "I stand behind what the voters of District 55 have told me, resoundingly. . .that education and economic development will resolve the issues of crime."

Bradley was a speaker at the 2000 Republican National Convention.
