= Trey Traviesa =

American politician

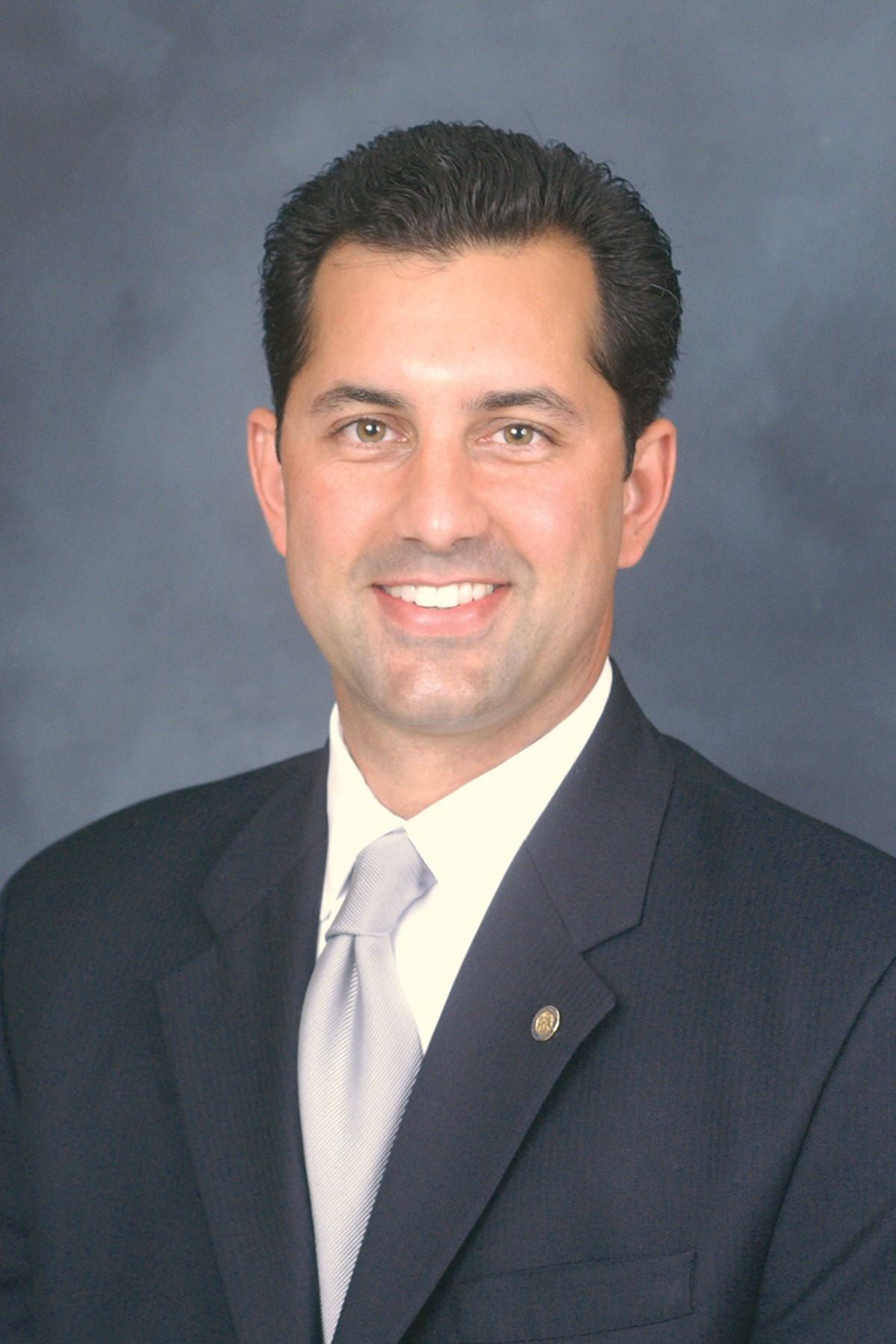

Member of the Florida House of Representatives from the 56th district
- In office 2004–2008
- Preceded by: Sandra Murman
- Succeeded by: Rachel Burgin

Personal details
- Born: December 30, 1969 (age 56) Tampa, Florida, U.S.
- Party: Republican
- Spouse: Nina Traviesa
- Education: Florida State University (BS); University of Texas, Austin (MBA)

Trey Traviesa is a Republican former Florida State Representative who represented Florida District 56 in the Tampa area.

== Election history ==
August 31, 2004 (Republican Primary) Florida House District 56: Deven Wanda Carty [13.6%], Lisa DeVitto [21.4%], Tim Mimbs [1.3%], Frank Shannon [15.3%], Chris Tompkins [16.2%], Trey Traviesa [32.2%].

November 2, 2004 (General Election) Florida House District 56: Neil Cosentino (Write in Candidate) [0.6%], Trey Traviesa (Republican) [72.1%], No Vote Cast for Position [27.3%]

November 7, 2006 (General Election) Florida House District 56: Trey Traviesa (Republican) [58%], Lee Nelson (Democrat) [42%]

August 12, 2008 Trey Traviesa announces that he will no longer serve in the Florida House.

August 16, 2008 Rachel Burgin, former Aid to Trey Traviesa is picked to replace him on the Republican Ballot.

November 4, 2008 Rachel Burgin wins house seat 59% over opponent Lewis Lariccia 39%.

November 19, 2008 Rachel Burgin is sworn into the Florida House of Representatives.
