= 2006 Florida Chief Financial Officer election =

2006 Chief Financial Officer of Florida General Election
- November 7, 2006
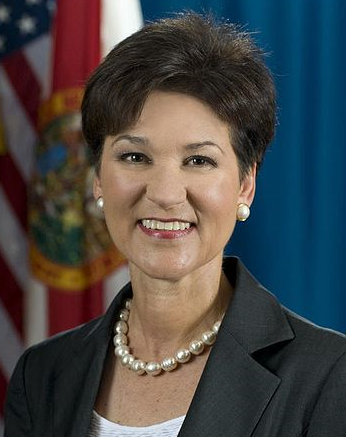

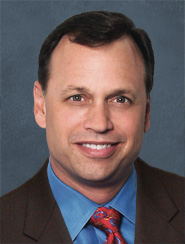
Nominee	Alex Sink	Tom Lee
Party	Democratic	Republican
Popular vote	2,479,861	2,151,232
Percentage	53.5%	46.5%
- County results Sink: 50–60% 60–70% 70–80% Lee: 50–60% 60–70% 70–80%
CFO before election
Tom Gallagher
Republican
Elected CFO
Alex Sink
Democratic

The 2006 Chief Financial Officer General election took place on November 7, 2006, to elect the Chief Financial Officer of Florida. The election was won by Alex Sink who took office on January 2, 2007. As of 2026, this is the only time a Democrat was elected to the office since its creation in 2002.

== Republican primary ==
- Tom Lee, State Senator
- Randy Johnson
- Milt Bauguess

=== Results ===
Republican primary results
Party	Candidate	Votes	%
Republican	Tom Lee	509,620	57.2
Republican	Randy Johnson	325,508	36.5
Republican	Milt Bauguess	56,128	6.3
Total votes		891,256	100

== Democratic primary ==
- Alex Sink, Wife of Bill McBride and Former Bank of America President

=== Results ===
Democratic primary results
Party	Candidate	Votes	%
Democratic	Alex Sink	Unopposed	–

== Results ==
2006 CFO election, Florida
Party	Candidate	Votes	%
Democratic	Alex Sink	2,479,861	53.5
Republican	Tom Lee	2,151,232	46.5
Majority		328,629	7.00
Turnout		4,631,093	
Democratic gain from Republican			
