= Florida Department of Financial Services =

State agency of Florida

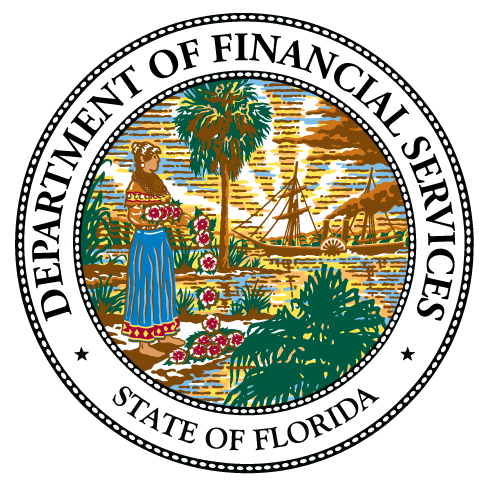

Agency overview
- Formed: 2002; 24 years ago
- Preceding agencies: Department of Insurance, Treasury and State Fire Marshal; Department of Banking and Finance
- Headquarters: Tallahassee, Florida
- Employees: 2,000
- Annual budget: $666 m USD (2026)
- Agency executive: Blaise Ingoglia, Florida Chief Financial Officer
- Website: myfloridacfo.com

Florida Department of Financial Services (FLDFS) is a state agency of Florida. Its headquarters are in Tallahassee. In 2002 the Florida Legislature merged the Department of Insurance, Treasury and State Fire Marshal and the Department of Banking and Finance into one department, the Florida Department of Financial Services.

== Organization ==
The department is led by the chief financial officer of Florida (CFO), who is elected statewide to a four-year term. The CFO is assisted in running the department by two deputy chief financial officers and a chief of staff. The department is made up of 14 functional divisions, which perform the work of the department, and 7 offices, which assist the CFO in managing the department and fulfilling the CFO's responsibilities.

- Chief Financial Officer
  - Accounting and Auditing Division
  - Administration Division
  - Consumer Services Division
  - Funeral, Cemetery, & Consumer Services Division
  - Information Systems Division
  - Insurance Agent and Agency Services Division
  - Insurance Fraud Division
  - Legal Services Division
  - Rehabilitation and Liquidation Division
  - Risk Management Division
  - Treasury Division
  - State Fire Marshal Division
  - Workers' Compensation Division
  - Cabinet Affairs Office
  - Chief of Staff Office
  - External Affairs Office
  - Inspector General Office
  - Insurance Consumer Advocate Office
  - Legislative Affairs Office
  - Strategic Planning Office
  - Public Assistance Fraud
