= Jim Frishe =

American politician (born 1949)

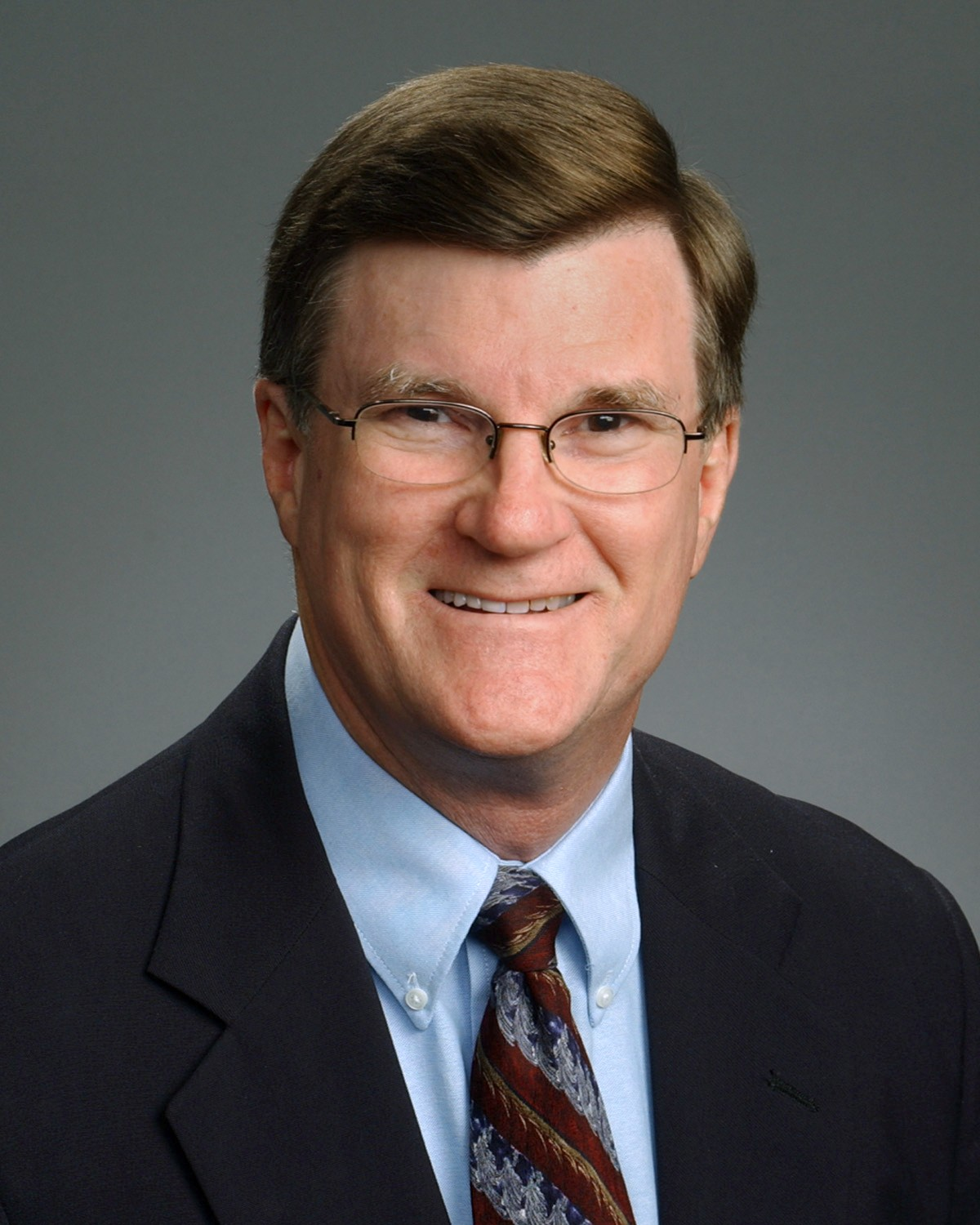

Member of the Florida House of Representatives from the 54th district
- In office November 7, 2006 – November 6, 2012
- Preceded by: Everett Rice
- Succeeded by: Debbie Mayfield (redistricted)

Member of the Florida House of Representatives from the 57th district
- In office November 6, 1984 – November 6, 1990
- Preceded by: Patricia Bailey
- Succeeded by: Mary Brennan

Personal details
- Born: April 6, 1949 (age 77) Potsdam, New York
- Party: Republican
- Spouse: Susan Burnett
- Children: 3
- Education: Andrew College (A.A.); University of Florida (B.A.)
- Occupation: Real estate broker

James C. Frishe (born April 6, 1949) is an American politician in the state of Florida. He was a member of the Florida House of Representatives for the 54th district from 1984 to 1990 and from 2006 to 2012. A Republican, he was the majority whip from 2010 to 2012.

== Early life ==
Frishe was born on April 6, 1949, in Potsdam, New York. He moved to Florida in 1956, receiving his associates degree from Andrew College in 1969 and a bachelor's degree from the University of Florida in 1971. He worked in insurance, consultation, and real estate. He is married to Susan Burnett and the couple have three children: William, Katherine and Erica. He lives in St. Petersburg, Florida, with his family.

== Political career ==
Frishe served as a representative in the Florida House of Representatives for the 54th district from 1984 to 1990 and from 2006 to 2012, as a Republican. He was the majority deputy whip between 2008 and 2010 and the majority whip from 2010 to 2012. He ran for the Florida Senate in 2012 but lost the Republican primary to fellow state representative Jeff Brandes. He ran to be the property appraiser of Pinellas County, Florida, in 2016, but he lost the Republican primary election to real estate appraiser Mike Twitty.

Frishe had described himself as a "Trump supporter". During the 2016 presidential election, he was involved in a Trump rally in Clearwater, Florida.
