= Peggy Peterman =

American journalist (ca. 1936 – 2004)

Peggy M. Peterman
- Born: ca. 1936; Tuskegee, Alabama, US
- Died: August 19, 2004; Bayfront Medical Center, St. Petersburg, Florida, US
- Education: Howard University
- Occupations: Journalist & columnist
- Employer: St. Petersburg Times
- Children: 2
- Father: William P. Mitchell
- Awards: NABJ Lifetime Achievement Award (1989); IWFM Lifetime Achievement Award (1999); NABJ Hall of Fame Honoree (2009)

Peggy Mitchell Peterman (née Mitchell; ca. 1936 – August 19, 2004) was an African American journalist and columnist at the St. Petersburg Times in St. Petersburg, Florida, United States. She was known for initiating the integration of the news that had previously been on a page devoted to blacks throughout the newspaper. She was awarded a Lifetime Achievement Award both from the National Association of Black Journalists and the International Women's Media Foundation in 1999.

== Personal ==
Peggy Mitchell was born c. 1936. She was the daughter of William P. Mitchell, a civil rights activist and was raised in Tuskegee, Alabama. She graduated from Howard University with a law degree. Her husband Frank Peterman also graduated from Howard University with a law degree. The couple moved to St. Petersburg, Florida. She had two sons Frank J. Peterman Jr., who is a Florida state representative, John, and a grandson by the name of Taffery. Peggy Peterman died at the age of 67 on August 19, 2004, at Bayfront Medical Center, St. Petersburg, as a result of heart disease.

== Career ==
In 1965, Peggy Peterman got a job at the St. Petersburg Times writing for the "Negro News Page". She worked for the Times for 31 years. Soon after, Peggy wrote a 14-page letter to the executive editor saying that this page should be terminated. By 1994, Peterman wrote columns conveying the experiences of black Americans. "My ambition as a journalist was always to help the public understand who and what the African-American family and culture was all about." Peterman received hateful letters for trying to stop the discrimination towards blacks. In her articles, she mainly wrote about what was close to her heart - social and children's issues - until her retirement in 1996.

She is also the founder of the Black History Pageant in St. Petersburg. The Black History Pageant started in 1978. The pageants were about the African-American spirit and they started off with 15 people in the audience watching the recitals of poetry and music done by talented African-American children. Crowds today have up to 2,000 people. After her retirement, Peterman became a minister.

In 2002, she became a minister at the Bethel Community Baptist Church

== Notable works of journalism ==
Peggy Peterman worked for the Times in St. Petersburg, Florida.

Peggy Peterman started writing for the St. Petersburg Times in 1965 for the "Negro News Page", which she set out to end and disperse the news throughout the newspaper. After 20 years as a reporter, Peterman became a columnist and joined the editorial board in 1994.

== Context ==
Peggy Peterman's career with the St. Petersburg Times spanned from 1965 to 1996 and during and after the Civil Rights Movement. Race was a core issue throughout her career. She was hired for the "Negro News Page". With Peterman's coverage over African-Americans via the "Negro News Page", the black-owned newspapers started to diminish in sale. She worked to integrate black and white news and abolish the page about blacks. In Peterman's earliest days writing for the St. Petersburg Times, she received letters from anonymous readers that were traced with racial epithet. Peterman would keep these letters as inspiration and told her colleagues in the newsroom to look ahead. During her career, she wrote about such issues as racially motivated attacks on youth to working on the improvement of St. Petersburg's community. She covered black issues with an approach that most journalists did not. Peterman said she could look at a community known to many as a low-income neighborhood in St. Petersburg, and report about it as a place that many people would call their home. Later, she told members of the National Association of Black Journalists, "You're almost extinct. The conservative voice is the one they're looking for." She was urging them to remain true to conveying the black perspective as she and others had done.

== Impact ==
In 1997, the Times made the Peggy Mitchell Peterman scholarship, that is awarded to a journalism student at Florida A&M University every year. The award includes an internship at the paper and $5,000.

== Awards ==
- National Association of Black Journalists, Lifetime Achievement Award, 1989
- The Martin Luther King Jr. Commemorative Commission and the Links honored Peterman with the Humanitarian Award in 1995.
- IWFM Lifetime Achievement Award, 1999
- Human and Civil Rights Award from the National Education Association
- Meritorious Achievement Award from FAMU
- Delta Sigma Theta Ethel Payne Journalism Award
- NABJ Hall of Fame Honoree (Posthumously, 2009)

== See also ==
- National Association of Black Journalists Hall of Fame
