= George Sheldon =

George Sheldon may refer to:

- George Sheldon (preservationist) (1818–1916), American historian and politician
- George L. Sheldon (1870–1960), 14th Governor of Nebraska
- George Sheldon (diver) (1874–1907), American Olympic diver
- George Sheldon (tennis) (1876–?), American tennis player
- George Sheldon (writer) (born 1951), American journalist and author
- George Sheldon (Florida politician) (1947–2018)
- George R. Sheldon (1857–1919), American banker; treasurer of the Republican National Committee
