= Helen Gordon Davis =

American politician (1926–2015)

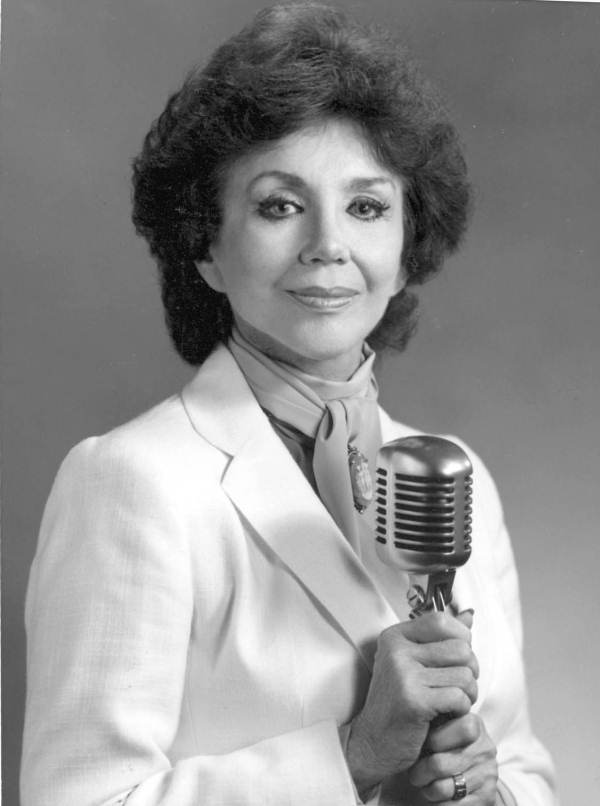

Member of the Florida Senate from the 23rd district
- In office November 8, 1988 – November 3, 1992
- Preceded by: Pat Frank
- Succeeded by: Malcolm Beard

Member of the Florida House of Representatives
- In office November 5, 1974 – November 8, 1988
- Preceded by: Elvin Martinez
- Succeeded by: Jim Davis
- Constituency: 70th district (1974–1982); 64th district (1982–1988)

Personal details
- Born: December 25, 1926 New York City, New York
- Died: May 18, 2015 (aged 88) Tampa, Florida
- Party: Democratic
- Spouse: Gene Davis
- Children: 3
- Education: Brooklyn College (B.A.); University of South Florida
- Occupation: Actress, drama teacher

Helen Gordon Davis (December 25, 1926 – May 18, 2015) was a Democratic politician from Florida who served as a member of the Florida House of Representatives from 1974 to 1988 and as a member of the Florida Senate from the 23rd district from 1988 to 1992.
