= Dennis Jones (Florida politician) =

American politician

Dennis L. Jones
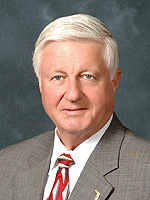

Member of the Florida Senate from the 13th district
- In office 2002–2012
- Preceded by: Victor Crist
- Succeeded by: Andy Gardiner

Speaker Pro Tempore of the Florida House of Representatives
- In office November 17, 1998 – November 21, 2000
- Preceded by: Luis Morse
- Succeeded by: Sandra Murman

Member of the Florida House of Representatives from the 54th district
- In office 1992–2000
- Preceded by: Lars Hafner
- Succeeded by: John Carassas

Member of the Florida House of Representatives from the 53rd district
- In office 1982–1992
- Preceded by: Peter Dunbar
- Succeeded by: Lars Hafner

Member of the Florida House of Representatives from the 57th district
- In office 1978–1982
- Preceded by: Dennis McDonald
- Succeeded by: Patricia Bailey

Personal details
- Born: April 5, 1941 (age 85) Erie, Pennsylvania
- Party: Republican
- Spouse: Susan Davis
- Profession: chiropractic physician

Dennis L. Jones (born April 5, 1941) was a former Republican member of the Florida Senate, representing the 13th District from 2002 to 2012. Previously he was a member of the Florida House of Representatives representing the 57th district from 1978 to 1982, the 53rd district from 1982 to 1992, and the 54th district from 1992 to 2000. He served as Speaker pro tempore from 1998 to 2000.
