= Alex Sink =

American politician (born 1948)

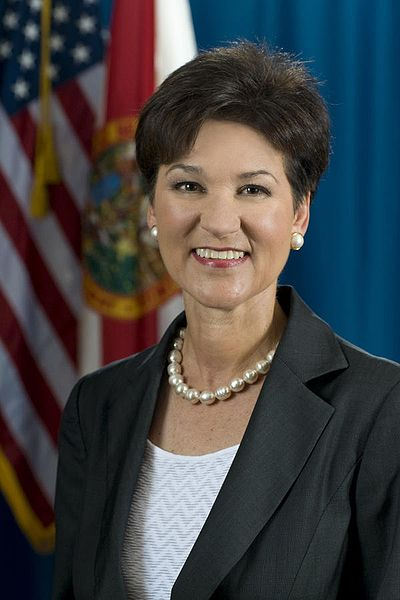
- Official portrait, 2009

2nd Chief Financial Officer of Florida
- In office January 2, 2007 – January 4, 2011
- Governor: Charlie Crist
- Preceded by: Tom Gallagher
- Succeeded by: Jeff Atwater

Personal details
- Born: Adelaide Alexander Sink; June 5, 1948 (age 78) Mount Airy, North Carolina, U.S.
- Party: Democratic
- Spouse: Bill McBride (m. 1987; died 2012)
- Children: 2
- Education: Wake Forest University (BA)

Adelaide "Alex" Sink (born June 5, 1948) is an American former politician and financier. A member of the Democratic Party, she was the second chief financial officer of the state of Florida and treasurer on the board of trustees of the Florida State Board of Administration. She was the Democratic nominee for Governor of Florida and faced Republican nominee Rick Scott in the 2010 Florida gubernatorial election, losing to Scott by a 1% margin. Sink also ran as the Democratic nominee in the 2014 special election for Florida's 13th congressional district, losing to Republican David Jolly on March 11, 2014.

== Personal life ==
Sink was born and raised in Mount Airy, North Carolina, the daughter of Adelaide A. (née Bunker) and Kester A. Sink. Her maternal great-grandfather was Chang Bunker, one of the famous conjoined "Siamese Twins", Chang and Eng Bunker. She is a graduate of Wake Forest University. After graduating with a degree in mathematics, she taught at a girls' school in Sierra Leone and at the American School in Liberia for three years. In 1992, she was elected to the Wake Forest University Board of Trustees, after which she was awarded the University's Distinguished Alumni Award in 1993. In 2000, she was inducted into the Tampa Bay Business Hall of Fame.

Sink is the widow of Florida attorney and politician Bill McBride, who was the unsuccessful Democratic nominee for Governor of Florida in 2002, making them the only married American couple to both run unsuccessfully in gubernatorial races. They have a son, Bert, and a daughter, Lexi.

== Political career ==
Sink is a former president of Florida operations at NationsBank, now Bank of America. She was appointed by former governor Lawton Chiles to the Commission on Government Accountability to the People. She also served on Chiles' Commission on Education and was vice-chair of Florida TaxWatch. Sink has served with the Florida Chapter of the Nature Conservancy, the Beth El Farm Workers Ministry, and as Chair of the Board of the United Way of Hillsborough County and the Suncoast chapters.

=== Florida chief financial officer ===
Sink was the Democratic candidate for Florida's office of chief financial officer in 2006. She defeated Republican Tom Lee 53.5 percent to 46.5 percent. She was also the first Democrat elected to the state Cabinet since 1998.

==== Florida Taj Mahal scandal ====
On August 30, 2010, Sink sent letters to the Florida Supreme Court and the Florida governor's inspector general, arguing that preliminary findings of an audit of spending on construction of a new courthouse warranted further investigation. The audit found excessive and ethically questionable spending on the new judicial building—which she referred to as the "Taj Mahal"—for the First District Court of Appeals. The Florida CFO's office subsequently admitted that money may have been misused and that as much as $16 million may have been spent in a financial raid on the state's Workers' Compensation Trust Fund. A $33.5 million bond for construction was attached to a transportation bill and passed on the last day of the 2007 Florida legislative session.

=== 2010 gubernatorial candidate ===
In 2008, Sink stated that she would "assess the landscape after the first of the year, and make a decision then." In January 2009, Sink announced she would not run for either seat, preferring to stand for reelection as CFO. The announcement that Gov. Charlie Crist would forgo re-election to run for the Senate seat being vacated by Mel Martinez altered her position, and on May 13, 2009, Sink announced her intention to run for governor.

On August 24, 2010, Sink won the Democratic primary for governor. She faced health care executive Rick Scott in the general election, as well as an independent (NPA) candidate, urban designer and policy analyst, Michael E. Arth. A former independent candidate, Bud Chiles, endorsed Sink in September 2010.

On October 25, 2010, during a televised debate, Sink read a text message sent to her makeup artist's cellular phone from a campaign official instructing Sink as to debate strategy, contrary to the rules of the debate. Sink fired the adviser who sent the text message.

After a close election, Sink conceded, giving victory to Scott. He scored 49% of the vote to Sink's 48%.

=== 2014 campaign for Congress ===
Republican Bill Young, who had represented the 13th District and its predecessors since 1971, died on October 18, 2013. On October 30, Sink told the Tampa Bay Times that she would run in the special election to replace him. She quickly gained support from national Democratic power brokers. The only other declared Democratic candidate, Jessica Ehrlich, who had faced Young in the 2012 general election, dropped out of the race on November 6, effectively handing the nomination to Sink. Sink faced David Jolly, Young's former general counsel, in the March 11 election.

A longtime resident of Thonotosassa in eastern Hillsborough County, Sink told the Tampa BayTimes that she would move to Pinellas County as soon as possible. Members of the House are required only to live in the state they represent, not the specific district. She signed a one-year lease for an apartment near her campaign headquarters in Clearwater to establish residency in the district, with plans to buy a house in the district later.

The 13th District had been in Republican hands since William Cramer won the seat in 1954; he was succeeded by Young in 1971. It had been one of the earliest districts in the South to turn Republican. It was widely thought that Sink had a chance of winning, as Obama carried the district twice, and Sink carried the district in her 2010 gubernatorial campaign against Scott. The race was close, with Sink earning 46.6 percent of the vote to Jolly's 48.4 percent.

== Political positions ==
=== Health care ===
Sink supported the Patient Protection and Affordable Care Act (H.R. 3020) passed by the United States Congress and enacted on March 30, 2010.

=== Adoption ===
Sink believes in the placement of children in a home where it is in the best interests of children, regardless of gender preference. She addressed a group of 300 gay and lesbian advocates at the Museum of Art Fort Lauderdale. She said, "We need a system in which all of our children are assured that they live in a healthy, loving home -- a home that's determined not by any law. The decision has to be made by the judge, in consultation with the experts, to determine what is the best for that individual child."

== Ruth's List Florida ==
In 2008, Sink founded Ruth's List Florida, named in honor of United States representative Ruth Bryan Owen, the first woman to be elected to the United States House of Representatives from Florida and the second to be elected from the American south. The organization aims to elect more Floridian women into public office.

== Post-political career ==
Since her two unsuccessful electoral campaigns, Sink has become involved in mentoring tech startups in the Tampa Bay area. Asked whether she would run for public office again, she said, "I've learned to never say never, but I don't think it will happen."

In 2011, Alex worked to launch the Florida Next Foundation, a non-profit, non-partisan policy foundation.

In 2017, Sink was elected a Life Trustee of Wake Forest University. In 2018, she was named as a member of the Tampa Bay Wave's Board of Directors, and she is still listed on the most recent 2023 Board of Directors.

In 2020, Sink was named 2020 Citizen of the Year by University of Florida's Bob Graham Center for Public Service in an online ceremony, due to the COVID-19 pandemic. As of April 2023, she is serving as a co-chair of the U.S. Global Leadership Coalition's Florida Advisory Committee. She also sits on the boards of the Dali Museum, Junior Achievement, United Way Suncoast and the Tampa Bay Waves.

== Electoral history ==
Chief Financial Officer of Florida General Election, 2006
Party	Candidate	Votes	%
Democratic	Alex Sink	2,479,861	53.55
Republican	Tom Lee	2,151,232	46.45
Total votes		4,631,093	100.0

Florida Gubernatorial Democratic Primary, 2010
Party	Candidate	Votes	%
Democratic	Alex Sink	663,800	76.9
Democratic	Brian Moore	199,896	23.1
Total votes		863,696	100.0

Florida gubernatorial election, 2010
Party	Candidate	Votes	%
Republican	Rick Scott	2,619,335	48.87
Democratic	Alex Sink	2,557,785	47.72
Independence Party of America	Peter Allen	123,831	2.31
Independent	C. C. Reed	18,842	0.35
Independent	Michael E. Arth	18,644	0.35
Independent	Daniel Imperato	13,690	0.26
Independent	Farid Khavari	7,487	0.14
Write-ins		121	0.0
Majority		61,550	1.15
Republican gain from Independent			

Florida's 13th Congressional District special election, 2014
Party	Candidate	Votes	%
Republican	David Jolly	89,095	48.52
Democratic	Alex Sink	85,639	46.64
Libertarian	Lucas Overby	8,893	4.84
Total votes		183,627	100.0

Political offices
Preceded by Tom Gallagher	Chief Financial Officer of Florida; 2007–2011	Succeeded by Jeff Atwater
Party political offices
First	Democratic nominee for Chief Financial Officer of Florida; 2006	Succeeded by Loranne Ausley
Preceded by Jim Davis	Democratic nominee for Governor of Florida; 2010	Succeeded by Charlie Crist
