= Malcolm Beard (Florida politician) =

American politician (1919–2019)

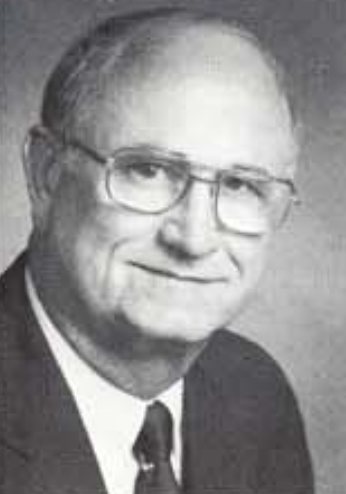

Member of the Florida Senate from the 23rd district
- In office 1992–1996
- Preceded by: Helen Davis
- Succeeded by: Tom Lee

Member of the Florida Senate from the 22nd district
- In office 1980–1992
- Preceded by: Guy Spicola
- Succeeded by: Don Sullivan

Member of the Florida House of Representatives from the 64th district
- In office 1978–1980
- Preceded by: Ed R. Blackburn Jr.
- Succeeded by: John A. Grant Jr.

Sheriff of Hillsborough County
- In office 1964–1978

Personal details
- Born: Malcolm Elmore Beard; February 21, 1919 Moultrie, Georgia, U.S.
- Died: January 2, 2019 (aged 99) Florida, U.S.
- Party: Democratic (up to 1985); Republican (1985–2019)
- Education: University of Tampa
- Occupation: sheriff, police officer

Malcolm Elmore Beard (February 21, 1919 – January 2, 2019) was an American politician from the state of Florida.

== Biography ==
Beard was born on February 21, 1919, in Moultrie, Georgia. He moved to Florida with his family in 1924, served in the United States Navy during World War II, and attended the University of Tampa. Beard worked for the Tampa Police Department from the 1940s until he was elected sheriff of Hillsborough County in 1964, ousting incumbent sheriff Ed Blackburn in what the Tampa Bay Times would later describe as "a tight, bitterly contested race — the last time Hillsborough County saw a truly competitive race for the office." He served as sheriff until 1978. Beard served in the Florida House of Representatives from 1978 to 1980. In 1979, he was elected to the State Senate for the 22nd district, and he served until 1996. In 1985, he changed districts and parties, sitting for the 23rd district as a Republican. The Hillsborough County Sheriff's Office's Malcolm E. Beard Sheriff's Operations Center was named after him in 2013. He died on January 2, 2019, at the age of 99.

Florida House of Representatives
Preceded by Ed R. Blackburn Jr.	Member of the Florida House of Representatives from the 64th district 1978–1980	Succeeded by John A. Grant Jr.
Florida Senate
Preceded by Guy Spicola	Member of the Florida Senate from the 22nd district 1980–1992	Succeeded by Don Sullivan
Preceded by Helen Davis	Member of the Florida Senate from the 23rd district 1992–1996	Succeeded by Tom Lee
