= Don Sullivan =

American politician (born 1936)

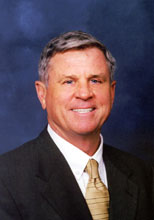

Member of the Florida House of Representatives from the 54th district
- In office October 7, 2003 – November 2, 2004
- Preceded by: John Carassas
- Succeeded by: Everett Rice

Member of the Florida Senate from the 22nd district
- In office November 3, 1992 – November 5, 2002
- Preceded by: Malcolm Beard (redistricted)
- Succeeded by: Lee Constantine (redistricted)

Personal details
- Born: June 10, 1936 (age 90) Chicago, Illinois
- Party: Republican
- Children: 3
- Education: Northwestern University (B.S.); Roosevelt University; Baylor University (M.D.)
- Occupation: Surgeon, university administrator

Military service
- Allegiance: United States
- Branch/service: United States Air Force
- Years of service: 1967–1969

Donald C. Sullivan (born June 10, 1936) is a Republican politician from Florida who served as a member of the Florida Senate from the 22nd district from 1992 to 2002 and as a member of the Florida House of Representatives from the 54th district from 2003 to 2004.

== Early life ==
Sullivan was born in Chicago in 1936, and attended Northwestern University, graduating with his bachelor's degree in 1958. He later attended Roosevelt University, and graduated from the Baylor University College of Medicine in 1962. Sullivan served in the U.S. Air Force as an orthopedic surgeon from 1967 to 1969, and moved to Florida in 1972, where he practiced as a surgeon.

== Florida Senate ==
In 1990, Sullivan ran for the Florida Senate against Democratic State Senator Jeanne Malchon in the 18th district, which was based in southern Pinellas County. In the Republican primary, he faced businesswoman Pat Baker and former State Representative Bob Melby. Sullivan placed first in the primary, winning 38 percent of the vote, and advanced to a runoff election with Baker, who placed second with 33 percent. He defeated Baker in a landslide in the runoff, winning 65 percent of the vote.

The general election against Malchon was hard-fought, with both candidates accusing the other of making false claims against the other. However, Malchon ultimately defeated Sullivan, winning re-election with 54 percent of the vote to his 46 percent.

Following redistricting, Sullivan ran for the State Senate again in 1992 from the newly created 22nd district, which included most of Pinellas County, challenging Republican State Senator Mary Grizzle in the primary. Sullivan argued that Grizzle, who was first elected to the legislature in 1963, had served long enough, and that the district needed new representation, while Grizzle "emphasized her reputation as a champion of education, equal rights and the environment." Sullivan placed first in the primary, winning 48 percent of the vote to Grizzle's 40 percent, while osteopathic physician Jo Arnold placed a distant third with 11 percent. He and Grizzle advanced to a runoff, which Sullivan won in a landslide, defeating Grizzle, 63-37 percent. He was unopposed in the general election.

Sullivan ran for re-election in 1994, and was challenged by Democrat Dee Billings, a program coordinator for a public health organization. He defeated Billings by a wide margin, winning 67 percent of the vote to her 33 percent. In 1998, Sullivan considered running for Education Commissioner, but ultimately declined to do so, and instead was re-elected to a third term in the Senate unopposed. He was term-limited in 2002.

== Florida House of Representatives ==
In 2003, two-term State Representative John Carassas, who represented the 54th district, announced that he would resign from the State House, triggering a special election. Sullivan, who took a position as an administrator at St. Petersburg College after leaving the legislature, announced that he would run to succeed Carassas. He won the Republican nomination unopposed and faced Democrat Dan Coleman, a lobbyist, in the general election. Sullivan defeated Coleman in a landslide, winning 73 percent of the vote to his 27 percent.

Sullivan was expected to seek a second term in 2004, but ultimately declined to do so, concluding that, after serving for a decade in the Senate, he did not want to wait several more years to build up seniority.
