= John Carassas =

American politician and judge (born 1966)

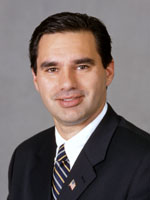

Judge of the Pinellas County Court, Group 15
- Incumbent
- Assumed office November 1, 2005
- Preceded by: Office created

Member of the Florida House of Representatives from the 54th district
- In office November 7, 2000 – July 16, 2003
- Preceded by: Dennis Jones
- Succeeded by: Don Sullivan

Personal details
- Born: May 13, 1966 (age 60) New York City, New York
- Party: Republican
- Spouse: Katherine Lialios
- Children: 1
- Education: University of South Florida (B.A.); Stetson University College of Law (J.D.)
- Occupation: Judge

John Carassas (born May 13, 1966) is an American politician and judge from Florida who has served as a judge of the Pinellas County Court since 2005. He previously served as a member of the Florida House of Representatives from the 54th district from 2000 to 2003.

== Early life ==
Carassas was born in New York City in 1966 and moved to Florida in 1983. He attended the University of South Florida, graduating with his bachelor's degree in 1987, and then from the Stetson University College of Law, graduating in 1990. After being admitted to the Florida Bar in 1991, Carassas worked as an assistant city attorney for the city of Clearwater.

== Florida House of Representatives ==
In 2000, State Representative Dennis Jones was term-limited, and Carassas ran to succeed him in the 54th district, which stretches from St. Pete Beach to Belleair in western Pinellas County. In the Republican primary, he faced Dan Curran, a pilot for American Airlines; Tony DiMatteo, the owner of a pest control business; and Dave Miller, a former Florida Power executive. Because the only candidates who filed were Republicans, the primary was opened and all voters could vote. Carassas narrowly placed second in the primary, winning 34 percent of the vote to Miller's 35 percent, and the two advanced to a runoff election. Though the runoff was expected to be close, Carassas won by a wide margin, receiving 57 percent of the vote to Miller's 43 percent.

Carassas ran for re-election in 2002, and won the Republican primary unopposed. His only opponent in the general election was Kurt Gratzol, a Green Party candidate. He was re-elected in a landslide, receiving 77 percent of the vote to Gratzol's 23 percent.

In 2003, Carassas announced that he would resign from the House, effective July 16, to head the Tampa office of Attorney General Charlie Crist.

== Pinellas County Court ==
In 2005, Governor Jeb Bush appointed Carassas to a newly created position on the Pinellas County Court. He was elected to a six-year term in 2008 without opposition, and was re-elected unopposed in 2014, 2020, and 2026.
