= Rachel Burgin =

American politician

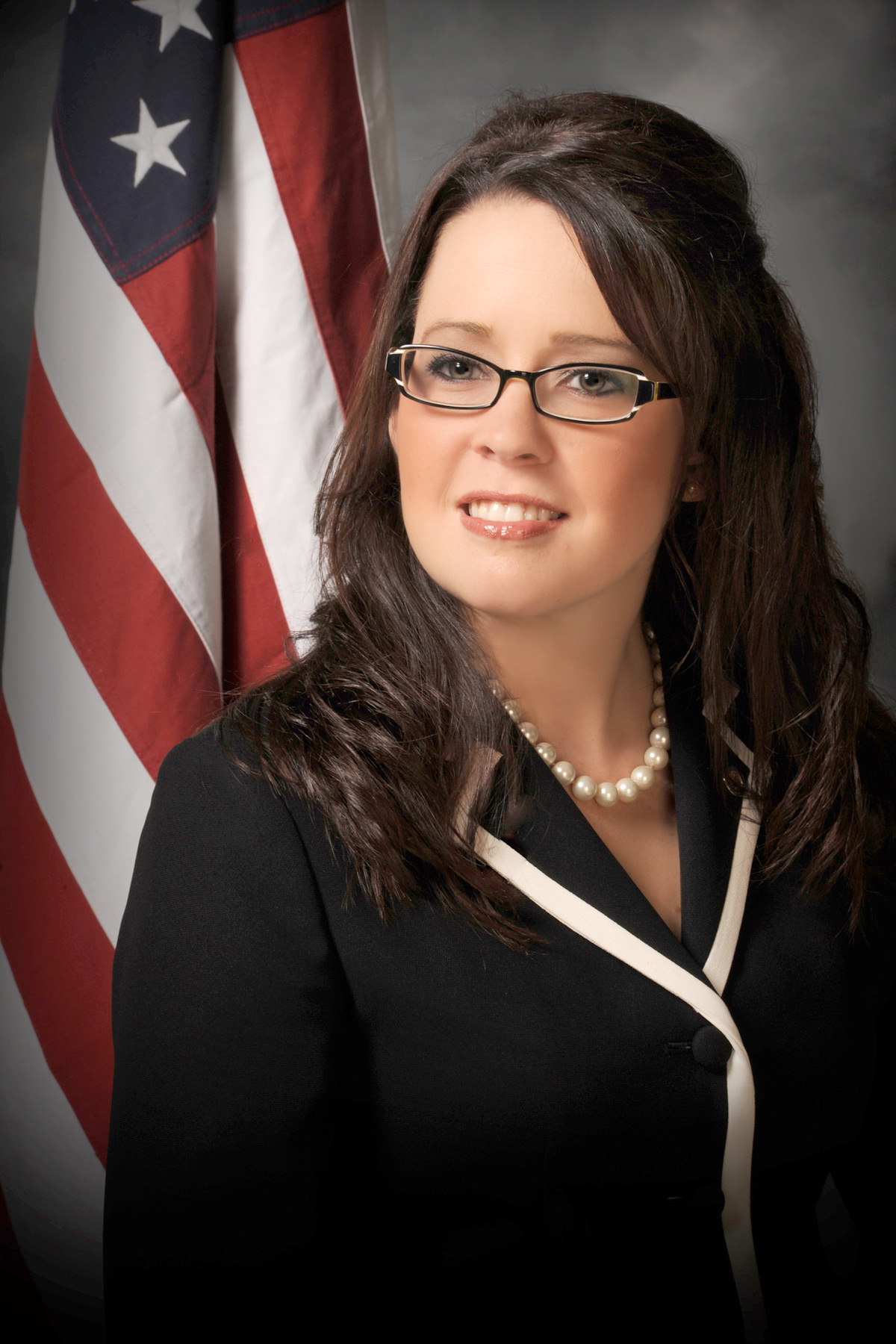

Member of the Florida House of Representatives from the 56th district
- In office 2008–2012
- Preceded by: Trey Traviesa
- Succeeded by: Ben Albritton

Personal details
- Born: July 23, 1982 (age 44)
- Party: Republican
- Education: Moody Bible Institute (BA)
- Profession: Legislative aide

Rachel Burgin (born July 23, 1982) was a Republican member of the Florida House of Representatives from 2008 to 2012. She represented the 56th district (which was located in Hillsborough County prior to state legislative district reconfiguration in 2012.) Burgin was first elected in 2008 over Democratic opponent Lewis Laricchia, a retired union negotiator, and was overwhelmingly re-elected in 2010 over Democratic challenger David Chalela.

As a state representative, Burgin found herself embroiled in controversy in November 2011, when she introduced legislation urging the federal government to reduce corporate taxes. As introduced, Burgin's legislation was identical to legislation written by the American Legislative Exchange Council, and even included the group's name and mission statement. She withdrew the bill the next day and re-introduced it 24-hours later, with a new bill number (HM 717), but now without the standard ALEC mission statement.

In 2012, rather than seek a third term in the House, Burgin ran for the Florida Senate from the 24th District. She faced former president of the Senate Tom Lee in the Republican primary, who overwhelmingly defeated her.
