= Joe Redner =

American businessman (1940–2026)

Joseph Richard Redner (July 2, 1940 – October 16, 2026) was an American businessman, activist, and sometime political candidate. Known as the "father of the nude lap dance", he was the long-time owner of the Mons Venus, a nude strip club in Tampa, Florida, until its sale to a competing club owner in May 2025.

== Early life and career ==
Joseph Richard Redner was born in Hackensack, New Jersey, on July 2, 1940.

Redner was engaged in legal battles with the Tampa City Council, which tried to place restrictions on the strip club from the 1980s. Mons Venus and Redner filed suits that reached the Florida Supreme Court and became case law in many court cases.

In 2005, Redner was awarded over $7 million in a case filed when the Florida Department of Transportation seized one of his properties by eminent domain to construct a freeway. While the Department of Transportation argued for a property value of $3 million, the jury determined that its highest and best use as an adult entertainment facility made it more valuable than typical commercial properties. Later that year, he filed a federal lawsuit against Hillsborough County commissioners after they banned the county itself from recognizing gay pride displays. The county filed a motion to have the case dismissed for lack of standing, since it believed that Redner had no personal interest in gay pride events, and no personal injury to seek redress. Redner then updated the case with a statement that he was gay, though he had previously never mentioned it publicly. Clay Risen's New York Times obituary for Redner asserts that he was not, in fact, gay. His fight against the ordinance pitted him against local politician Ronda Storms on many occasions.

He ran for County Commissioner as an independent in 2006. During that run Redner had a chair thrown at him on the Bleepin Truth LIVE in a debate with a Republican pundit, Tony Katz. The clip from the show was carried on 300 TV stations across the country, giving Redner a tremendous boost in name recognition in the process. Redner's website, The Voice of Freedom, was initially created to inform citizens of his ongoing legal battles with the government, but later expanded to cover other First Amendment issues. He was a host of a weekly, live call-in television.program titled First Freedom TV on Tampa Bay Community Network (TBCN.org), a local Tampa Bay area public, educational, and government access (PEG) cable TV channel.

On March 6, 2007, Redner garnered the number two spot in a six-person race for Tampa City Council, District 1, and faced the incumbent chairperson in a runoff March 27, 2007. Joe Redner gained 44% of the vote but lost the election.

Redner appeared on Live Prayer to debate his beliefs and defend his business.

== Medical marijuana case ==
In 2018, Redner made headlines again when he sued the Florida Department of Health for the right to grow his own marijuana. Redner was in remission from lung cancer, and his doctor recommended hemp juice as part of his treatment. Florida passed medical marijuana via a constitutional amendment in 2016, but juicing is not one the methods approved by that law, so Redner sued to be able to grow and juice his own. On April 17, 2018, the judge in the case lifted a stay that had delayed the effect of her earlier ruling allowing Redner to begin growing marijuana while the case proceeded, a decision the Department of Health said it planned to appeal. Upon appeal, Redner lost the case in April 2019. The Florida 1st District Court of Appeal found "that 'use' does not mean 'grow' or 'process,' as Mr. Redner argues". In June 2019, Redner's lawyers took steps to ask the Florida Supreme Court to take up the case.

== Death ==
Joe Redner died in his sleep at his home in Tampa on October 16, 2026, at the age of 86.
