= Everett Rice =

American politician (born 1944)

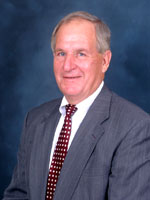

Member of the Florida House of Representatives from the 54th district
- In office November 2, 2004 – November 7, 2006
- Preceded by: Don Sullivan
- Succeeded by: Jim Frishe

Pinellas County Sheriff
- In office January 3, 1989 – November 2, 2004
- Preceded by: Gerry Coleman
- Succeeded by: Jim Coats

Personal details
- Born: September 3, 1944 (age 82) Roanoke, Virginia
- Party: Republican
- Spouse: Linda Rice
- Children: 3
- Education: University of South Florida (B.A.); Stetson University College of Law (J.D.)
- Occupation: Attorney

Military service
- Allegiance: United States
- Branch/service: United States Merchant Marine
- Years of service: 1964–1967

Everett S. Rice (born September 3, 1944) is a Republican politician from Florida who served as a member of the Florida House of Representatives from the 54th district from 2004 to 2006 and as Pinellas County Sheriff from 1989 to 2004.

== Early life ==
Rice was born in Roanoke, Virginia, in 1944, and graduated from the University of South Florida. He served in the United States Merchant Marine from 1964 to 1967, and joined the Pinellas County Sheriff's office as a deputy in 1967. Rice attended the Stetson University College of Law while on leave from the sheriff's office from 1982 to 1985, and left in 1985 to practice as a criminal defense lawyer.

== Pinellas County Sheriff ==
In 1988, Rice challenged Sheriff Gerry Coleman for re-election in the Republican primary. He attacked Coleman for mismanagement of the office, citing multiple investigations of the office by state and federal law enforcement agencies. Rice defeated Coleman in a landslide. In the general election, he defeated Pinellas Park police officer Leroy Kelly, the Democratic nominee.

Rice ran for a second term in 1992, and was challenged by former sheriff's deputy Scott Kuebler in the Republican primary. Kuebler attacked Rice for "not provid[ing] a higher level of service" while "the budget . . . has gone up." However, both the Tampa Tribune and St. Petersburg Times endorsed Rice for re-election, with the Tribune arguing that "the Pinellas Sheriff's Office is better off now than it was four years ago," citing his creation of a civil service board and administrative improvements. The Times similarly concluded that Rice "has made great progress in the sheriff's department," and noted that the election was "about continuing the gains in law enforcement professionalism, or turning back the clock." Rice won renomination by a wide margin, receiving 67 percent of the vote to Kuebler's 33 percent. He did not face an opponent in the general election and won his second term unopposed.

In 1996, Rice ran for a third term. Though he faced criticism over his management of the county jail, including for an incident in which an inmate died after the contracted medical provider did not call emergency services in time, he was re-elected by a wide margin over Democrat Georgia Palmer, a court psychologist.

Rice ran for a fourth term in 2000, and was challenged by two opponents in the Republican primary: St. Petersburg police officer Jack Soule, the president of the local Police Benevolent Association, and Tom McKeon, a retired Philadelphia police officer. He defeated both by a wide margin and won the general election unopposed.

== Florida House of Representatives ==
In 2004, Rice did not seek a fifth term as Sheriff, and instead ran for the Florida House of Representatives from the 54th district following the unexpected decision by State Representative Don Sullivan not to seek re-election. He faced no opponent in the primary or general election and won unopposed.

== 2006 campaign for Attorney General ==
When Attorney General Charlie Crist declined to seek a second term to instead run for governor, Rice ran in the Republican primary to succeed him. Rice faced former Congressman Bill McCollum and State Representative Joe Negron in the Republican primary, and was seen as a "long shot" candidate. He campaigned as a "tough on crime" candidate and earned the endorsement of most of the state's sheriffs.

On July 10, 2006, Rice dropped out of the race, citing fundraising difficulties, and Negron did the same shortly thereafter, leaving McCollum as the nominee by default.

== 2012 campaign for Sheriff ==
In 2011, Rice's successor as sheriff, Jim Coats, announced that he would not seek re-election, and he ultimately resigned from office. Rice ran to succeed Coats, and ended up challenging Bob Gualtieri, who was appointed by Governor Rick Scott to serve out the final year of Coats's term.

Though Gualtieri won the endorsement of prominent state and local politicians, including Coats, Rice's campaign spent significantly more money than Gualtieri's did. Rice attracted controversy for accepting the endorsement of Richard Mack, a former sheriff from Arizona who headed the Constitutional Sheriffs and Peace Officers Association, and for signing the Oath Keepers' pledge. Gualtieri ultimately won the primary over Rice, receiving 57 percent of the vote to Rice's 43 percent, which Rice attributed to Gualtieri's "negative ads."
