= Dream Defenders =

American non-profit organization

Dream Defenders is a human rights non-profit organization that aims to end policing and abolish prisons (especially private prisons) based in Miami, Florida. It is considered a project of Tides Advocacy. It is a feminist, socialist, abolitionist, and internationalist group. It is geared towards people of color who share the goal of multi-racial organizing among other goals. They espouse to end the school-to-prison pipeline by redefining notions of freedom and safety.

== History ==
Dream Defenders was created in 2012 in response to the murder of Trayvon Martin. Florida A&M University students Gabriel Pendas, Phillip Agnew, Ciara Taylor, and Nelini Stamp founded the group.

In July 2013, Dream Defenders occupied the Florida State Capitol building for 31 days in response to and the acquittal of Trayvon Martin's killer George Zimmerman. They aimed to raise awareness about and push for the repeal of Florida's Stand Your Ground self-defense law. House Speaker Will Weatherford eventually agreed to speak with them about Stand Your Ground. A member of the organization, Dr. Armen Henderson, was arrested while preparing to help provide free COVID-19 testing to homeless populations.

In 2022, Dream Defenders and a coalition of Miami-based nonprofits helped start a free urgent care clinic as part of the city's Healing and Justice Center. They focused on providing direct service outside of the policing and prison systems.

The Dream Defenders also raise money for education.

== Founders ==
=== Ciara Taylor ===
Ciara Taylor, one of the founders, grew up in the suburbs in Florida and attended Florida A&M University in Tallahassee. She served as both the political director and the director of political consciousness at Dream Defenders. In high school, Taylor protested the United States 2000 presidential election, between Al Gore and George W. Bush, after Bush was elected president. Taylor felt frustrated and hopeless in this process because she felt as though she could not actively influence the decision being made about her soon-to-be president. She continued this activism into college at Florida A&M, where she advocated for living wages for campus workers and advocated against budget cuts that defunded her major a year before she graduated.
