= George Sheldon (writer) =

American writer

George Sheldon (born December 21, 1951) is an American freelance writer, journalist and author.

== Background ==
George Sheldon was born in Lancaster, Pennsylvania, as the sole child of George G. Sheldon and June L. Warfel Sheldon. His parents are of both German and Scots-Irish descent. Because of this background and connections with many previous Lancaster County ancestors, Sheldon often refers to himself as "Pennsylvania Dutch" or a "Pennsylvania Dutchman."

Sheldon is a Pennsylvania York Rite Freemason. He is an active member of Lodge No. 43, in Lancaster, PA. In addition, he is a member of the Valley of Lancaster and the Valley of Harrisburg, a Consistory of the Scottish Rite of Freemasonry, Northern Masonic Jurisdiction.

Sheldon is a member of the Society of Professional Journalists. He is also the cofounder of the Central Pennsylvania Writers Organization (CPWO).

== Writing ==
Before launching his writing career, Sheldon served as a sworn municipal police officer in Pennsylvania. He became the Chief of Police of North Londonderry Township Police Department in Lebanon County. He later worked as a newspaper correspondent for the Lancaster Newspapers for over five years. As a writer, Sheldon built a long line of credits and eventually authored over 1,000 articles.

=== Publications ===
One of Sheldon's earlier books, When the Smoke Cleared at Gettysburg, published by Cumberland House in 2003, was a Washington Post bestseller.

As of 2009, Sheldon has published over 30 books. Recent book titles include:

- 250 Questions Every Landlord Should Ask, Adams Media, 2009
- Start Your Own Freelance Writing Business and More: Copywriter, Proofreader, Copyeditor, Journalist, Entrepreneur Press, 2008
- Start Your Own Graphic Design Business, Entrepreneur Press, 2008
- Sales & Pitch Letters for Busy People, Career Press, 2007
- Fire on the River, The Defense of the World's Longest Covered Bridge and How It Changed the Battle of Gettysburg, Quaker Hills Press, 2006
- Cash In on the Coming Real Estate Bust, John Wiley & Sons, 2006
- The Pocket Idiot's Guide to Potty Training Problems, Alpha Books, 2006
- The Complete Idiot's Guide to Real Estate Investing Basics, Alpha Books, 2006

=== Future publications ===
Sheldon is currently working on a true crime book and also a history book about the Molly Maguires. Sheldon is known to work on several books at the same time while working on multiple projects for his clients. While other authors work on one book at a time until completion, Sheldon often does not.

== Other works ==
Sheldon is also a noted speaker and sometimes provides editorial consultation and training. He has worked as a technical editor and a ghostwriter on a freelance basis. He teaches writing and related subjects at workshops, seminars and conferences. His personal website has been online since 1995. He is also an active blogger, and in January 2009, launched The Scribbler, a blog about true crime writing.

Sheldon also presents a seminar called Get Your Book Published! that assists future book authors in getting published.

In early 2006, Sheldon established Quaker Hills Books, his own imprint, to publish local history topics. The press currently has released five titles.
