= Ronda Storms =

American politician from Florida (born 1965)

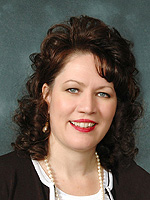

Member of the Florida Senate from the 10th district
- In office 2006–2012
- Preceded by: Tom Lee
- Succeeded by: Tom Lee (Redistricted to 24th District in 2012)
- Constituency: Eastern Hillsborough County, Southeast, Pasco County and Western Polk County

Hillsborough County Commission, District 4
- In office 1998–2006
- Succeeded by: Al Higginbotham
- Constituency: Bloomingdale, Brandon, Plant City, Riverview, Sun City Center, Valrico, Zephyrhills

Personal details
- Born: September 5, 1965 (age 61) Des Moines, Iowa, U.S.
- Party: Republican
- Spouse: David Storms
- Children: Roxanna Storms; Elijah Storms
- Occupation: Educator, attorney

Ronda Rehnell Storms (née Newcomb, September 5, 1965) is an American politician representing her adopted home state of Florida. Affiliated with the Republican Party, she represented the 10th District in the Florida Senate from 2006 to 2012. She decided not to run in 2012 for the new 24th District.

Storms had an eight-year tenure on the Hillsborough County Commission (1998-2006) and advanced a number of controversial issues.

== Background and personal life ==
Ronda Newcomb was born in Des Moines, Iowa, into a military family, and moved around often, growing up in Germany, Turkey and Alabama. Spending many formative years in Turkey, she used to be fluent in the Turkish language, but has had "little call for the language recently."

The Newcomb family finally settled in Brandon, Florida when Ronda was 16, and she graduated from Brandon High School in 1983. She earned a Bachelor of Arts degree in English education from the University of South Florida in 1988, as a S.C.A.T.T. honors graduate. For a time, she taught English at Bloomingdale High School in Valrico, Florida, and later went on to pursue her Juris Doctor at the Stetson College of Law in Gulfport, graduating in 1995 Cum Laude.

She married David Storms in December 1986. They have one daughter, Roxanna (born 1999) and one son, Elijah Gideon (born 2008). They currently reside in her home district in Valrico. Her husband is a deacon at Brandon First Baptist Church, where she has been a member for over 25 years.

== Hillsborough County Commission ==
In all three of her elections, Storms ran on a "responsibility" platform, believing strong moral principles from voters, politicians and other public officials were key for there to be responsible government. In addition to simply acting in a "morally responsible" fashion, Storms was also a proponent of sunshine laws, believing that people can only trust government officials when they can see for themselves that they are not corrupt. Storms' other platforms included strong constituent service and family values, helping make the cost of living affordable for military families, and lower taxes.

=== Elections and challengers ===
Storms was first elected to the Hillsborough County Commission in 1998. She was re-elected in 2002 and 2004. Her opponent in 2002 was Arlene Waldron, who claimed that Storms' comments had polarized too many constituents. Since both candidates were Republican, Storms won the election in 2002 at the state primary level. Her opponent in 2004 was Jean Batronie, who ran as an independent.

=== Issues ===
==== Florida A&M School of Law ====
In the summer of 2000, alumni from Florida A&M University asked the Commission for a $1,000,000 commitment to start a School of Law in Tampa (the main branch of Florida A&M is based in Tallahassee). Storms, attending the meeting that night, said "We can get them through law school, but we can't get them to pass the Bar." She then later claimed that she had meant that creating a historically black law school will not increase the number of minority lawyers in the state. The comment met with much controversy in the black community of Tampa, as well as with the Florida A&M alumni still living in Florida, as it was perceived that Storms made a remark that minority students were not smart enough to be capable of passing the state Bar exam.

When asked if the comment about minorities being capable to pass the Bar was offensive to her, Mary White Darby, president of the Florida A&M Tampa alumni association, responded, "How could she not offend you?" Carolyn Collins, former vice president of Florida A&M's national alumni association, said, "I don't think (Storms) is important enough. All someone has to do is look at her track record or watch her on TV and see how she responds. She has not been stable in some of her comments." After the backlash, Storms took on a more conciliatory tone and openly apologized, stating that she is not a racist, and personally tried to make amends with Thomas Scott, who at the time was the only black member of the Commission. He said of her, "She wanted me to understand that she isn't a racist, and that is not my perception. She's a very vocal person. It's just her style."

Even though her comment created controversy, Storms was adamant in not allowing Florida A&M to open a law school in Tampa. It was eventually opened in Orlando in 2002.

==== Child abuser sterilization plan ====
In 2004 and 2005, Storms tried to introduce a law which would approve sterilization for men and women convicted of child abuse in Hillsborough County so that, in her view, child abusers would not be able to continue to produce children that would become abused also. The original motion was approved by all commissioners in attendance in February 2005. When the County Attorney, Renée Lee, made it known to Storms that only the state legislature could pass such statutes, not the County Commission, she made it high priority to lobby for the bill to various legislators. Originally the bill called for sterilization to be voluntary, but between February and April 2005, Storms rewrote the bill, which would make sterilization a mandatory part of sentencing. The Florida legislature turned down Storms' bill in 2005, citing lack of time to discuss it. The bill also did not come up for discussion in 2006, meaning the ruling from the Commission in early 2005 does not have any legal standing.

==== Ending county funding to Planned Parenthood ====
In 2005, Storms called for the elimination of funding for a teenager outreach program funded by Planned Parenthood, which teaches adolescents about safe sex, drugs, gangs, and family violence. The refusal for funding was passed by the board by a vote of 5-2. By doing so, the Commission cut off any aid to Planned Parenthood, as the county does not fund any other Planned Parenthood initiatives.

After Barbara Zdravecky, who oversees Planned Parenthood for 15 counties throughout central Florida, asked Storms to reconsider her proposal on July 21, 2005, Storms said she told Zdravecky, "I am pro-life and you're not...There is nothing you can say or do for me to support you. Thank you very much for your comments." After the exchange, Storms recalled smiling at Zdravecky and thanking her again for her request to reconsider. Zdravecky, however, recalls that Storms was much more blunt, saying "I am pro-life, you are pro-death" twice. Recalling her side of the events, Zdravecky said, "I have to say I was pretty shaken. I'm used to taking hits. But I was surprised at her lack of humanity...I believe anyone who professes to be a proponent of Christianity would treat me with more dignity than the way I was treated."

==== Positions on gay issues ====
In June 2005, some library patrons complained about a book display at the West Gate Regional Library in Town 'n' Country honoring June, which is Gay and Lesbian Pride Month. Storms heard about the complaints and decided to put to a vote to ban such book displays in county libraries. On June 15, however, she moved for the Commission to "adopt a policy that Hillsborough County government abstain from acknowledging, promoting or participating in gay pride recognition and events, little g, little p." In effect, by adding the footnote "little g, little p," the county would be abstaining from acknowledging, promoting or participating in any recognition or events for gay pride at any time, not just during "Gay and Lesbian Pride Month," with "big G and big P."

The vote was passed 5-1, with Commissioner Ken Hagan out of the room during the vote, and Kathy Castor dissenting, saying "I think it's inappropriate for government to promote discrimination." Storms then asked that an addendum be placed upon the bill, that it cannot be repealed without a super majority vote of at least 5-2, and a public hearing. This time Hagan joined the vote and the addendum was passed 6-1, with Castor again being the only dissent. In the public hearing portion of the meeting, which occurred before the meeting, many people spoke out against the removal of book displays, not knowing of the impending vote. The policy was repealed by the Commission on June 5, 2013, with a 7-0 vote. "

Vonn New, the central Florida director of Equality Florida, an LGBT rights group, said, "I think that Hillsborough County commissioners sent a very clear message that not everyone is welcome here. I think it's shameful what the commission has done." Reverend Phyllis Hunt, the pastor at the local Metropolitan Community Church, said, "I'm stunned, disappointed and shocked that there was zero conversation about the vote." Storms never mentioned removing gay materials from libraries, which are still included in libraries throughout Hillsborough County.

In October 2005, Kathy Castor proposed a statute which would prohibit discrimination on the basis of sexual orientation in the workplace in Hillsborough County, in both the public and private sectors. The statute, which was once law in Tampa, was repealed in 1995 and rejected in 2000. The commissioners, led by Storms, voted 5-2 to reject Castor's statute. Castor and Thomas Scott were the dissenters. Storms then asked for a motion to raise the number of votes needed from commissioners to place the issue on direct referendum to county voters from four commissioners to five.

In December 2005, Joe Redner, who owns the nationally known strip club Mons Venus, filed a lawsuit against every Commission member except for Castor, alleging discrimination as a result of the June 15 vote. At the same time, Redner, who people had believed was straight, came out on a WFLA-AM morning show broadcast. Redner and Storms had fought before, most recently in November 2005 over a donation Redner had made to needy children. Storms had been a longtime foe of Redner, as she has tried to curtail Redner's business on many occasions, due to his occupation, in Storms' words, as the "purveyor and seller of female flesh."

== Florida Senate ==
=== Senate race ===
In April 2006, Storms announced her intention to run for the state Senate seat that was being vacated by Senate President Tom Lee. From the outset, her Democratic challenger was Iraq War veteran and Hillsborough Community College staff member Stephen Gorham, a newcomer to politics. Shortly after her announcement to run for the Senate seat, Storms spoke out against the virulent backlash she had received in the gay community. When asked by the hosts of Bay News 9's Political Connections whether she supported homosexual people becoming foster parents or adopting, Storms replied "I don't support putting at-risk children in homes that I think are at-risk themselves." Of the response she received from Tampa's gay community, Storms said, "I've had all sorts of threats and horrible things said and done to me...things done to my church, things done to my home, and personal threats ... Ive never attacked anybody's appearance and in fact worked very closely with people who are out-of-the-closet homosexuals and they will tell you I have never done anything but treat them with dignity and respect in my personal working relationship with them."

During the summer, Shelby McIntyre of Tampa started UNbanned.org, a reference to, among other issues, Jean Batronie being banned from appearing on public-access television cable TV for a debate, implying that station owners choose to only air programming Storms approves of, lest Storms try to convince the Commission that public-access television not receive funding by the county. Filmmaker Amy Nestor also created a video documentary, UNbanned, about the Ronda Storms gay pride vote.

Despite the campaigning against Storms by the gay community of Tampa, and Gorham hitting hard with campaign television advertisements and insisting that Storms was an "empty suit who's all style and no substance," and that "the thing about Ronda is that she only will look out for the interests of folks who look and act like her ...she pretty much ignores everyone else," Storms won the Senate seat in a close match in November 2006.

=== Issues and controversies ===
==== "Pole Tax" ====
In February 2008, Storms introduced a bill that immediately became known as the Florida "Pole Tax". Florida Senate Bill 1520 would tax adult entertainment, including escorts and strippers, and use the money to fund additional services at the Department of Children and Families.

==== Academic Freedom bill (SB2692) ====
Storms has had a key role in a bill promoting the teaching of intelligent design in public school science classrooms. On February 29, 2008, Storms introduced The Academic Freedom bill (SB2692) in the Florida Senate. The bill did not require any change to the current science curriculum and under the bill, evolution would still be taught as a matter of law. The bill gave express statutory right and protection for teachers to "present scientific information that is relevant to the full range of views on biological and chemical evolution." The bill did not authorize the teaching of creationism or intelligent design. Under the act, all students would still have been required to learn and be tested upon all aspects of the Science Standards, including evolution.

Its sponsor in the Florida House of Representatives (as HB1483) is Representative Alan Hays, who arranged for a private screening of the intelligent design promotion film Expelled: No Intelligence Allowed for Florida legislators who are to vote on the bill.

The House bill underwent substantial modification and, as amended, requires the intelligent design lesson plan "Critical Analysis of Evolution" to be taught.

John Stemberger of the evangelical Florida Family Policy Council, one of the drafters of the bill, said that intelligent design could not be taught, though "criticisms" of evolution could, and the teacher would have to follow the curriculum. Stein said it was the teacher who would decide what was "scientific information", and the program officer for public policy and legal affairs of the Discovery Institute, Casey Luskin, said that intelligent design constituted "scientific information." The Miami Herald saw this as acknowledgement that the bill would make it easier to bring up religiously tinged intelligent design in public-school science classrooms. Wesley R. Elsberry considered that this would enable the Discovery Institute to recruit sympathetic teachers to introduce religiously motivated antievolution arguments, and lawsuits would depend on someone with standing being willing to become a plaintiff. John West of the Discovery Institute said that "scientific information" would be determined by science teachers themselves in consultation with their science curriculum staff and their school boards. This would bypass the Florida education standards identified by science domain experts and education experts.

The American Civil Liberties Union expressed concerns that these bills would make it easier to teach intelligent design as science in public schools:

The presumption of this bill is that all you have to do to teach something in a science class is to call it science. Simply saying something is science does not make it so and calling Intelligent Design science, does not make it science. Intelligent Design relies on the assertion that there is a supernatural creator, which inherently precludes it from being scientific, as the ACLU proved in our landmark case in Dover, PA.

— Howard Simon, Executive Director of the ACLU of Florida

The bill was also criticised for its inconsistency in only protecting the freedom of teachers to discuss anti-evolution arguments, but not other controversies:

If it's OK for science teachers to talk about controversial alternatives to Darwin, it should be OK for health teachers to talk about birth control and abortion. ... With intellectual inconsistency such as this, it's hard to see this effort as anything other than a ham-handed attempt to keep the flames of religion vs. evolution in public schools burning.

— Michael Mayo, Proposed Academic Freedom Act ripe with mumbo jumbo, South Florida Sun-Sentinel

Storms claimed she was contacted by multiple teachers who had been disciplined for speaking of alternative theories, despite those critics who said retaliation never occurred.

Democrats later introduced a proposal to have the protection extended to sex-education, but Storms voted against it.

A 'Bill Analysis and Fiscal Impact Statement' prepared by the Senate Education Pre-K - 12 Committee staff stated that:

- "Taken as a whole, the science standards [already] encourage teachers and students to discuss the full range of scientific evidence related to all science, including evolution."
- "According to the Department of Education, there has never been a case in Florida where a public school teacher or public school student has claimed that they have been discriminated against based on their science teaching or science course work."
- The bill creates ambiguity in its lack of definition of "biological and chemical evolution" and "objective scientific information", because it is silent on how this bill would affect teacher discipline over the science standards and by employing the word "may" in the context of student evaluation.
