= Leslie Waters =

American politician

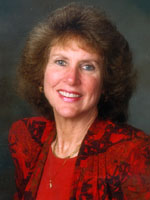

Speaker pro tempore of the Florida House of Representatives
- In office November 16, 2004 – November 7, 2006
- Preceded by: Lindsay Harrington
- Succeeded by: Dennis K. Baxley

Member of the Florida House of Representatives from the 51st district
- In office November 3, 1998 – November 7, 2006
- Preceded by: Mary Brennan
- Succeeded by: Janet Long

Personal details
- Born: August 24, 1947 (age 79)
- Party: Republican
- Spouse: Al Waters
- Education: Florida State University (B.S.), (M.S.); Stetson University College of Law (J.D.)
- Profession: Attorney

Leslie Waters (born August 24, 1947) in St. Petersburg, Florida.

Leslie Waters served as a State Representative in the Florida House of Representatives for 8 years (1998-2006), terming out as Speaker Pro-Tempore. She has served on the City of Seminole Council for 10 years, as Councilor, Vice Mayor, Interim Mayor, and currently as Mayor since 2013. She is the proprietor of Leslie Waters Government Relations, travels as an International Democracy Consultant, author of Good Morning Mayor, What's up? a book about local government, the government closest to the people. She received both her Bachelor's and master's degrees from Florida State University, and lives in Seminole, Florida, with her husband, Al Waters.
