= Patricia Bailey-Snook =

American politician (1936–2014)

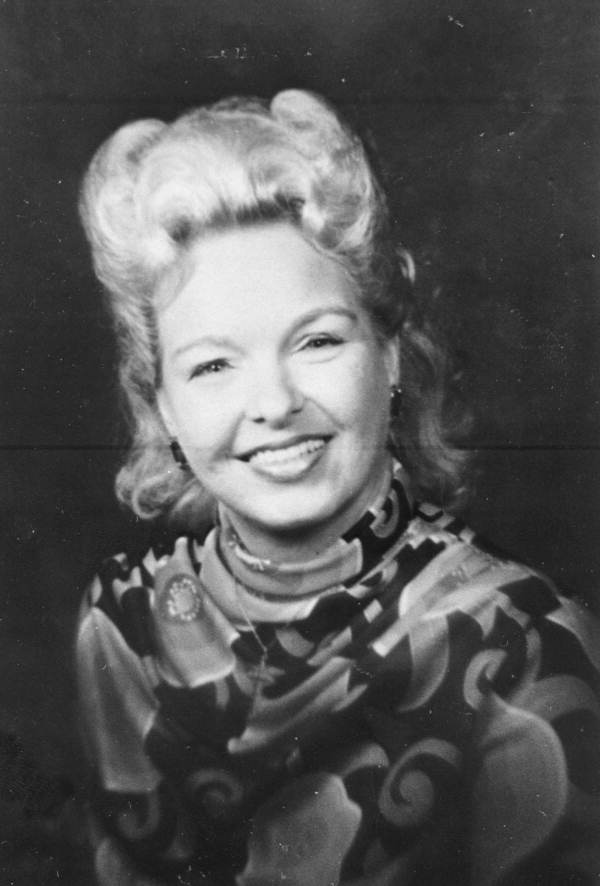

Member of the Florida House of Representatives from the 57th district
- In office November 2, 1982 – November 6, 1984
- Preceded by: Dennis Jones
- Succeeded by: Jim Frishe

Personal details
- Born: February 11, 1936 Harrodsburg, Kentucky
- Died: December 8, 2014 (aged 78) Sumterville, Florida
- Party: Democratic
- Spouses: Larry Allan Bailey (died 1982); John Snook (m. 2000)
- Children: 2
- Education: St. Petersburg Junior College; University of Florida; Florida Atlantic University

Patricia L. Bailey-Snook (February 11, 1936 – December 8, 2014) was a Democratic politician from Florida who served as a member of the Florida House of Representatives from the 57th district from 1982 to 1984.

== Early life ==
Bailey-Snook was born in Harrodsburg, Kentucky, in 1936, and moved to Florida later that year. She was politically active in Pinellas Park, serving on the planning and zoning commission and winning election to the city council in 1973. She served on the city council until 1982, when she resigned to run for the legislature.

== Florida House of Representatives ==
In 1982, Bailey-Snook ran for the Florida House of Representatives from the 57th district, which was based in central Pinellas County. In the Democratic primary, she faced activist Ron Lowe and former county school board member Gareth Whitehurst. Bailey-Snook won the primary by a wide margin, receiving 58 percent of the vote to Whitehurst's 21 percent and Lowe's 20 percent. In the general election, she was opposed by insurance executive Jim Frishe, the Republican nominee. Bailey-Snook narrowly defeated Frishe, winning 51 percent of the vote to his 49 percent.

Bailey-Snook ran for re-election in 1984, and faced a rematch with Frishe. She campaigned on her support for public education and environmental protection, and her campaign raised and spent significantly more than Frishe's. Frishe narrowly defeated Bailey-Snook for re-election, winning 51–49 percent.

In 1986, when Frishe ran for re-election, Bailey-Snook ran against him. Though the race was competitive, Frishe ended up winning re-election by a wider than expected margin, ultimately receiving 56 percent of the vote to her 44 percent.

== Post-legislative career ==
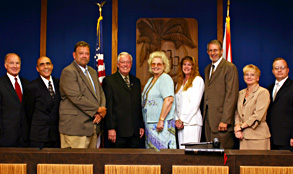
Bailey-Snook (center) in 2005 with other members of the Pinellas Park City Council

Bailey-Snook ran for the Pinellas Park City Council again in 1987, when City Councilman Sandy Dunkum faced a recall election. Dunkum was recalled by a wide margin, and Bailey-Snook won the election to replace him, receiving 38 percent of the vote. She served on the city council until 2008, when she declined to seek re-election. After leaving the council, she and her second husband, John Snook, retired to Lake Panasoffkee.

== Death ==
Bailey-Snook died on December 8, 2014.
