= Chief Financial Officer of Florida =

Elected statewide constitutional officer of Florida

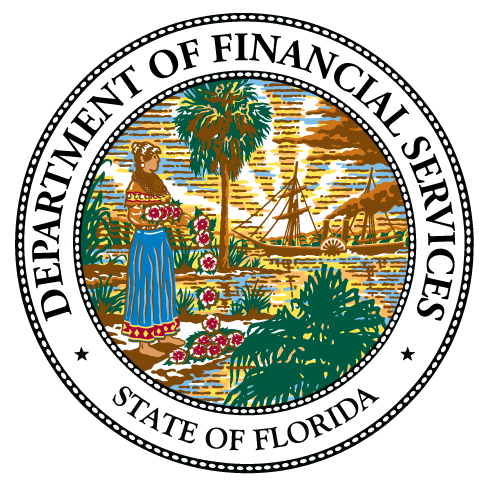

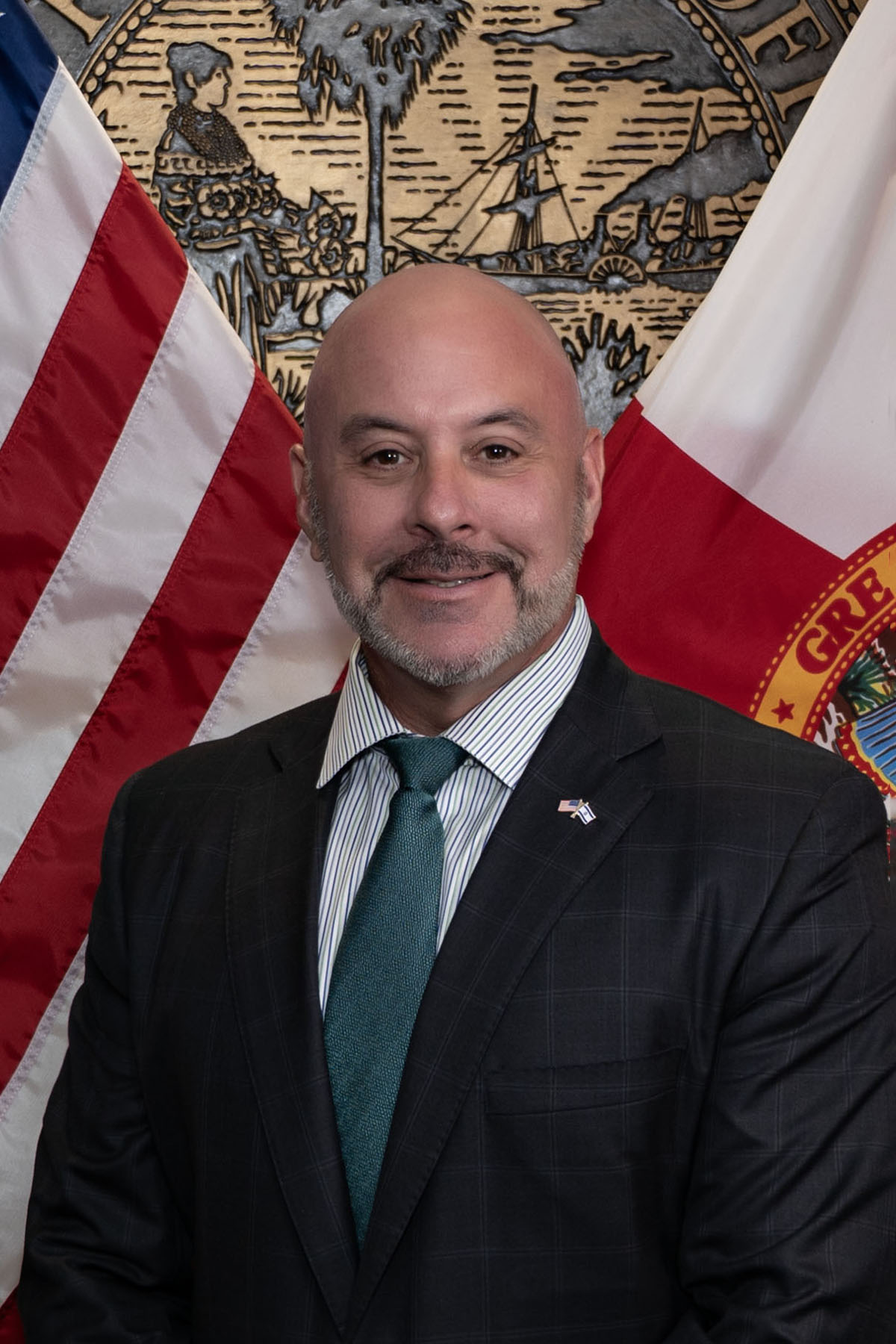
- Incumbent; Blaise Ingoglia since July 21, 2025
- Department of Financial Services
- Term length: 4 years, renewable once
- Inaugural holder: Tom Gallagher; 2003
- Formation: 2002
- Succession: Third
- Website: www.myfloridacfo.com

The chief financial officer of Florida is an elected statewide constitutional officer of Florida. The office was created in 2002 following the 1998 reforms of the Florida Cabinet. The CFO is a combination of the former offices of comptroller and treasurer/insurance commissioner/fire marshal. The office heads the Florida Department of Financial Services and is responsible for overseeing the state's finances, collecting revenue, paying state bills, auditing state agencies, regulating cemeteries and funerals, and handling fires and arsons. In addition, the CFO has administrative oversight over the offices which handles banking and insurance regulation. The CFO is a member of the Cabinet, and is third (behind the lieutenant governor and attorney general, respectively) in the line of succession to the office of governor of Florida.

== History ==
Tom Gallagher was the first state CFO and a former treasurer/insurance commissioner/fire marshal. Gallagher retired from the position in 2006 and Alex Sink (D), a Florida business executive and the wife of former Florida gubernatorial candidate Bill McBride, was elected on November 7, 2006. Alex Sink launched an unsuccessful campaign for governor in 2010, and was succeeded by Jeff Atwater. Atwater resigned and then-governor Rick Scott appointed Jimmy Patronis to the post. Patronis won a statewide election and retained the post in 2018 and again in 2022. On November 25, 2024, Patronis announced his resignation from Chief Financial Officer of Florida effective March 31, 2025, to run for the special election for the seat Matt Gaetz held prior to his November 2024 resignation.

== List of chief financial officers ==
Chief financial officers by party affiliation
| Party | CFOs |
|---|---|
| Republican | 4 |
| Democratic | 1 |

| # | Image | Name | Term of service | Political party |
|---|---|---|---|---|
| 1 | | Tom Gallagher | 2003–2007 | Republican |
| 2 | | Alex Sink | 2007–2011 | Democratic |
| 3 | | Jeff Atwater | 2011–2017 | Republican |
| 4 | | Jimmy Patronis | 2017–2025 | Republican |
| – | | Susan Miller; Acting | 2025 | Republican |
| 5 | | Blaise Ingoglia | 2025–present | Republican |

== Florida Insurance Guaranty Association ==
The Florida Insurance Guaranty Association (FIGA) was created by the Florida Legislature in 1970 as a nonprofit corporation to process covered claims of insolvent members by or against Florida policyholders with a limit of $300,000 per residence or non-residence commercial; $200,000 per condominium unit. Association members are all Florida-licensed direct writers of property and/or casualty insurance. FIGA's authority is codified in the Florida Insurance Guaranty Association Act, Florida Statutes 631.50 through 631.70. FIGA has the power to levy assessments against the insurer's direct written premiums, not to exceed 2% in any calendar year. The commissioner in the Office of Insurance Regulation retains oversight over FIGA.

== Office of Insurance Regulation ==
The Florida Office of Insurance Regulation (FOIR) is responsible for all activities concerning insurers and other risk bearing entities, including licensing, rates, policy forms, market conduct, claims, issuance of certificates of authority, solvency, viatical settlements, premium financing, and administrative supervision, as provided under the Florida Insurance Code or Chapter 636, Florida Statutes. The head of the OIR is the Florida insurance commissioner, appointed by the Financial Services Commission (FSC). Michael Yaworsky is the current Florida insurance commissioner.

== Transparency 2025 ==
The FOIR commissioned a confidential "Affiliated Fee Analysis" in 2022 to track how insurance companies were funneling billions in management and claim-handling fees into affiliate companies while claiming millions in paper losses. The state paid consultants $150,000 for the report, which was not released for more than two years. The Florida Senate inadvertently released it unredacted through a public records request, then threatened newspapers with felony charges if they did not destroy it. Mainstream publications like the South Florida Sun Sentinel and Orlando Sentinel refused and published the report to provide public transparency into skyrocketing premiums.

=== Legislative reaction ===
In December 2022, the Florida Legislature had a special session where a major insurance reform made it more difficult for policyholders to sue insurers, who insisted that frivolous lawsuits raised insurance premiums. Legislators wanted to know why the Affiliated Fee Analysis report had not been shared with them. At a hearing that lasted three hours in March 2025, House Democrats and Republicans questioned Insurance Commissioners David Altmaier (2016-2022) and Michael Yaworsky (2023-present). Regulators struggled to justify why the report was withheld. Legislators were told the report "raised red flags" but was an "unfinished draft". At a subsequent hearing when the report's author testified, it was stated that the final draft was submitted on April 1, 2022, no feedback was received and there were no change requests from the regulators. Representative Danny Alvarez asked, "You’re at your final draft, so it is inaccurate for them to have said you were not finished. So either they weren’t telling us the truth or you weren’t telling the truth. Which one was that?" The proposed HB881 and HB1399 would require insurers to demonstrate that fees, commissions, and other payments to affiliates are fair and reasonable, but companion bills in the Senate went nowhere. The issue received considerable press when the story broke in early 2025, but no follow-up. All bills died without any resolution and there were no repercussions for insurance companies involved in misconduct.

=== Report findings ===
- The report tracked 53 Florida property insurers from 2017 to 2019 following hurricanes Michael and Irma. Those companies claimed net losses of $432 million while company affiliates had net income of $1.8 billion.
- Those insurers distributed dividends of $680 million to shareholders while claiming the need for premium increases.
- By moving money to related companies, their balance sheets appeared weak but their actual financial condition was obscured; some firms went bankrupt.

== Financial Services Commission ==
The Financial Services Commission (FSC) is composed of the Florida governor, chief financial officer, attorney general, and commissioner of agriculture. The FSC serves as agency head for purposes of rulemaking pursuant to sections 120.536-120.565, Florida Statutes. FSC action is taken by majority vote. In case of a tie, the governor's side prevails.

== See also ==
- Constitution of Florida
- Florida Cabinet
- Florida chief financial officer election, 2006
- Florida chief financial officer election, 2010
- Florida chief financial officer election, 2014
- Florida Democratic Party
- Republican Party of Florida
