= Bill Heller =

American politician (1935–2020)

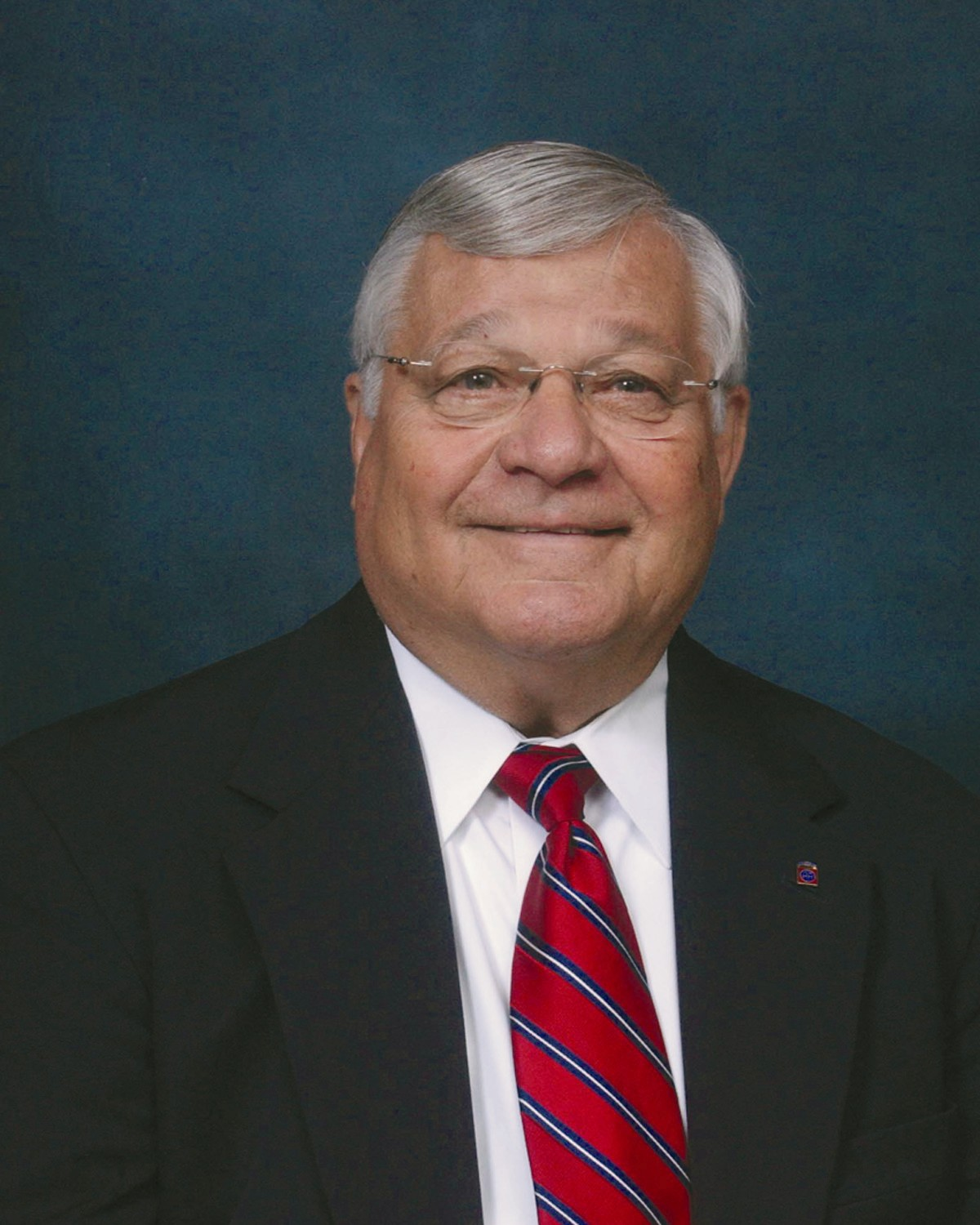
- Official portrait, 2006

Member of the Florida House of Representatives from the 52nd district
- In office January 2007 – January 2011
- Preceded by: Frank Farkas
- Succeeded by: Jeff Brandes

Personal details
- Born: Harold William Heller; September 3, 1935 Scales Mound, Illinois, U.S.
- Died: September 11, 2020 (aged 85) St. Petersburg, Florida, U.S.
- Party: Democratic
- Spouse: (Marlene) Jeanne Heller
- Children: 3
- Education: Southern Illinois University (B.S.); Northern Illinois University (M.S.); Colorado State College (Ed.D.)
- Occupation: Professor

Harold William Heller (September 3, 1935 – September 11, 2020) was an American politician and educator.

Heller served as the Dean of the College of Education and Director of the Wally and Louise Bishop Center for Ethical Leadership and Civic Engagement at the University of South Florida, St. Petersburg. He represented Florida House District 52 for two terms in the Florida House of Representatives and served on or chaired several non-profit agencies' boards of directors.

== Early life ==
Heller was born in Scales Mound, Illinois. He attended Bradley University in 1954. From 1954 to 1956, he served in the United States Army with the 82nd Airborne Division, earning the Parachutist Badge and the Expert Rifleman's Badge. He graduated from Southern Illinois University with a Bachelor of Science in elementary and special education in 1959. In 1961, Heller received a Master of Science in guidance and counseling from Northern Illinois University. In 1964, he received an Education Doctorate in special education from the University of Northern Colorado.

== Academic career ==
From 1980 to 1992, Heller was dean of the University of North Carolina at Charlotte's College of Education and Allied Professions. He moved to Florida in 1992 to head the University of South Florida's St. Petersburg campus, becoming the first permanent head in three years, beginning in August 1992. His predecessor, Lowell E. Davis, had died in 1989, and several temporary replacements had served in the interim. Heller's role was to develop the campus' business, liberal arts, and journalism departments, as well as to complete the library and marine center building projects.

From 1992 to 2002, Heller led the St. Petersburg campus as dean and chief executive officer. He resigned as CEO of the St. Petersburg campus at the request of USF president Judy Genshaft and became a faculty member in August 2002. The City Council had planned to demolish its Bayfront Center arena and theater complex and lease the land to USF, which intended to use the site to build a conference center. However, they reconsidered their plans after Heller's resignation because a rental agreement with an outside agency, such as USF, would have required a referendum. Other options included renovation and finding some other use for the land after demolition. His successor was Karen White, former dean of fine arts at the University of Nebraska at Omaha and a concert violinist originally from Joplin, Missouri.

== Political career ==
=== 2006 election ===
Although party officials usually remain neutral in primaries, several Pinellas Democrats endorsed Heller over Liz McCallum in the contest to determine the candidate who would succeed Frank Farkas. These included County Commissioner Calvin Harris, State Representatives Charlie Justice and Frank Peterman, Jr., St. Petersburg City Council members James Bennett, Rick Kriseman, and Rene Flowers, and School Board member Linda Lerner. County Commissioner Ken Welch remained neutral on the county canvassing board. McCallum had lost to Farkas in the 2004 election. Although McCallum had been the Democratic candidate in the 2004 election, Heller was encouraged to run by colleague Betty Castor, a former president of USF and former Florida Secretary of Education. He entered the race after McCallum had already been campaigning for about a year. After stepping down as head of the St. Petersburg campus, he served on the boards of directors of Bayfront Medical Center, the Community Foundation of Tampa Bay, the Great Explorations Museum, the Florida International Museum, and Pinellas Association of Retarded Children. He cited his educational experience and ties to the community as important qualities.

Heller's community connections allowed him to overcome his late start in fundraising and outpace McCallum's campaign efforts. While she was taking a traditional door-to-door approach, he was able to raise money by making phone calls to acquaintances he had made over the previous 14 years. The St. Petersburg Times endorsed Heller, calling him a person with the ability to solve problems through consensus-building and his work to make USF St. Petersburg independent. It also praised his efforts on the taxpayer funding of teachers' pay and his leadership in Sunken Gardens. The Pinellas Democrats PAC endorsed a slate of candidates and ran an ad critical of Heller. In return, a graphic designer who had done work for the Heller campaign accused the PAC of violating contribution laws based on a $5000 contribution it had received and criticized Democrats attacking fellow Democrats. The PAC representatives countered that the $500 limit per individual contributor does not apply to PACs. The Florida Democratic Party protested the word "Democrats" in its name. Heller narrowly defeated McCallum in the primary to face Republican Angelo Cappelli, the chair of the St. Anthony Hospital Foundation, in November.

Heller and Cappelli differed notably in both personality and their social policy positions. Cappelli was seen as taking an authoritarian approach, while Heller was more inclined to collaborate with others. Heller favored prosecuting crimes based on sexual orientation as hate crimes and supported same-sex unions. He said he would ban the sale of semi-automatic weapons and advocated including contraceptive and safe sex information in sex education classes. Heller said he supported embryonic stem cell research and categorized himself as pro-choice. Darryl Paulson, a local political analyst, described their differences on social issues as irrelevant, with property insurance as the biggest issue for voters. Heller said he would address cherry-picking by auto and life insurance companies. Cappelli favored encouraging insurance companies to return to the Florida market by implementing a state catastrophe fund. Cappelli was seen as appealing to the Republican base and received contributions from individuals and the Florida Republican Party. Heller's support extended beyond the Democratic Party because of his long-term civic activity and his ability to work across party lines. Cappelli's campaign distributed a flyer paid for by the Florida Republican Party that described Heller as a "nutty professor." The ad misrepresented Heller's support of the teacher's pay referendum, which was overwhelmingly supported by the voters, as a pro-tax increase stance. Heller again received the St. Petersburg Times endorsement. While praising him for an "impressive" resumé, they described Cappelli as having "regressive views on gay rights, sex education, gun control, and school funding", based on his responses to a questionnaire from the Christian Coalition. Heller's years with USF, his involvement with the community, and his ability to work with others were cited as essential qualities. His progressivism reflected the interests and views of voters in District 52. Despite the attack campaign and a disadvantage in campaign contributions, Heller won the election. His long-term ties to the area included a friendship with Republican Governor Charlie Crist, who endorsed neither candidate.

=== First term in the Florida Legislature ===
During his first term, he was a member of the Agribusiness, Utilities and Telecommunications, and Post Secondary Education Committees, as well as a member of the Schools and Learning Council. He was the ranking Democrat on the Post Secondary Education Committee, and he sponsored several bills.

In June 2006, a Pinellas Park man claimed to have been thrown out of a bar for not drinking, despite his assertions that he was acting as the designated driver for his group. State Senator Mike Fasano, who claims to be a non-drinker, introduced a bill in the Senate to ban requiring bar patrons to drink, and Heller sponsored the bill in the House. There was an increase in the number of homeless people attacked by teenagers in Florida in 2006. In response, the Legislature acted to stiffen prison sentences for those who attack the homeless. Heller was one of four House sponsors of the bill, and State Senator Arthenia Joyner sponsored an identical bill in the Senate.

Heller and two other Pinellas Democrats, Janet Long and Darryl Rouson, voted to support the use of school vouchers, which Florida Democrats have historically opposed, citing separation issues. Heller initially opposed it, but stated he was persuaded that it was an issue of quality education after meeting with the parents who used vouchers to send their children to a private school. He opposed a Bill in 2008 (HB 257) that would require pregnant women to have a sonogram before undergoing a first-trimester abortion.

=== 2008 election ===
Heller was among three Pinellas legislative candidates endorsed by the Suncoast Group for the Sierra Club, along with Carl Zimmerman and Janet Long. He was endorsed by the St. Petersburg Chamber of Commerce and the Associated Industries of Florida. He also won the endorsement of the St. Petersburg Times. They cited his ability to work across party lines and his experience as an educator and former administrator with USF. They credited him with legislation that reduced the influence of the FCAT, working to ensure that autistic children could receive health care coverage, and with the designated driver law. They believed he would help prioritize educational programs in an era of reduced expenditures and increasing budgetary constraints. They also said he would offer insight into the problem of making windstorm insurance coverage more available and affordable.

Heller won re-election on November 4, 2008, defeating Republican Ross Johnson with 60% of the vote. Their campaign was amicable, and they waved to voters side by side on the same St. Petersburg street corner. He had support from Republican mayors Rick Baker of St. Petersburg and Frank Hibbard of Clearwater.

== Personal life and death ==
Heller and his wife, Marlene Jeanne Heller, were married for 59 years. They had three children and three grandchildren.

He died on September 11, 2020.
