= 2009 St. Petersburg, Florida mayoral election =

- September 1, 2009 (first-round); November 3, 2009 (runoff)
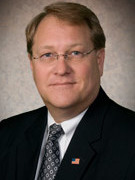

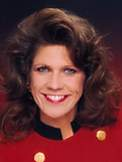

Candidate	Bill Foster	Kathleen Ford
First round	9,906; 27.03%	9,417; 25.70%
Runoff	24,303; 52.75%	21,773; 47.25%
Candidate	Deveron Gibbons	Scott Wagman
First round	7,154; 19.52%	5,549; 15.14%
Runoff	Eliminated	Eliminated
Mayor before election
Rick Baker
Nonpartisan
Elected mayor
Bill Foster
Nonpartisan

The 2009 St. Petersburg, Florida, mayoral election was held on November 3, 2009, following a primary election on September 1, 2009. Incumbent Mayor Rick Baker was barred by term limits from seeking a third term, and a crowded race emerged to succeed him. Former City Councilmember Bill Foster placed first in the primary election with 27 percent of the vote and advanced to the general election against former City Councilmember Kathleen Ford, a 2001 candidate for Mayor. In the general election, Foster narrowly defeated Ford, 53–47 percent, to win the election.

== Primary election ==
=== Candidates ===
- Bill Foster, former City Councilmember
- Kathleen Ford, former City Councilmember, 2001 candidate for Mayor
- Deveron Gibbons, businessman
- Scott Wagman, real estate broker
- Larry J. Williams, former City Councilmember, 2001 candidate for Mayor
- Jamie Bennett, City Councilmember
- Ed Helm, retired attorney, 2005 candidate for Mayor
- John Warren, restaurateur, historic preservationist
- Richard Eldridge, U.S. Marine Corps veteran
- Paul Congemi, former builder

=== Results ===
2009 St. Petersburg, Florida, mayoral primary election
Party	Candidate	Votes	%
Nonpartisan	Bill Foster	9,906	27.03%
Nonpartisan	Kathleen Ford	9,417	25.70%
Nonpartisan	Deveron Gibbons	7,154	19.52%
Nonpartisan	Scott Wagman	5,549	15.14%
Nonpartisan	Larry J. Williams	2,145	5.85%
Nonpartisan	Jamie Bennett	1,398	3.81%
Nonpartisan	Ed Helm	577	1.57%
Nonpartisan	John Warren	264	0.72%
Nonpartisan	Richard Eldridge	120	0.36%
Nonpartisan	Paul Congemi	119	0.32%
Total votes		36,649	100.00%

== General election ==
=== Results ===
2009 St. Petersburg, Florida, mayoral general election
Party	Candidate	Votes	%
Nonpartisan	Bill Foster	24,303	52.75%
Nonpartisan	Kathleen Ford	21,773	47.25%
Total votes		46,076	100.00%
