= 2017 St. Petersburg, Florida mayoral election =

- August 29, 2017 (first-round); November 7, 2017 (runoff)
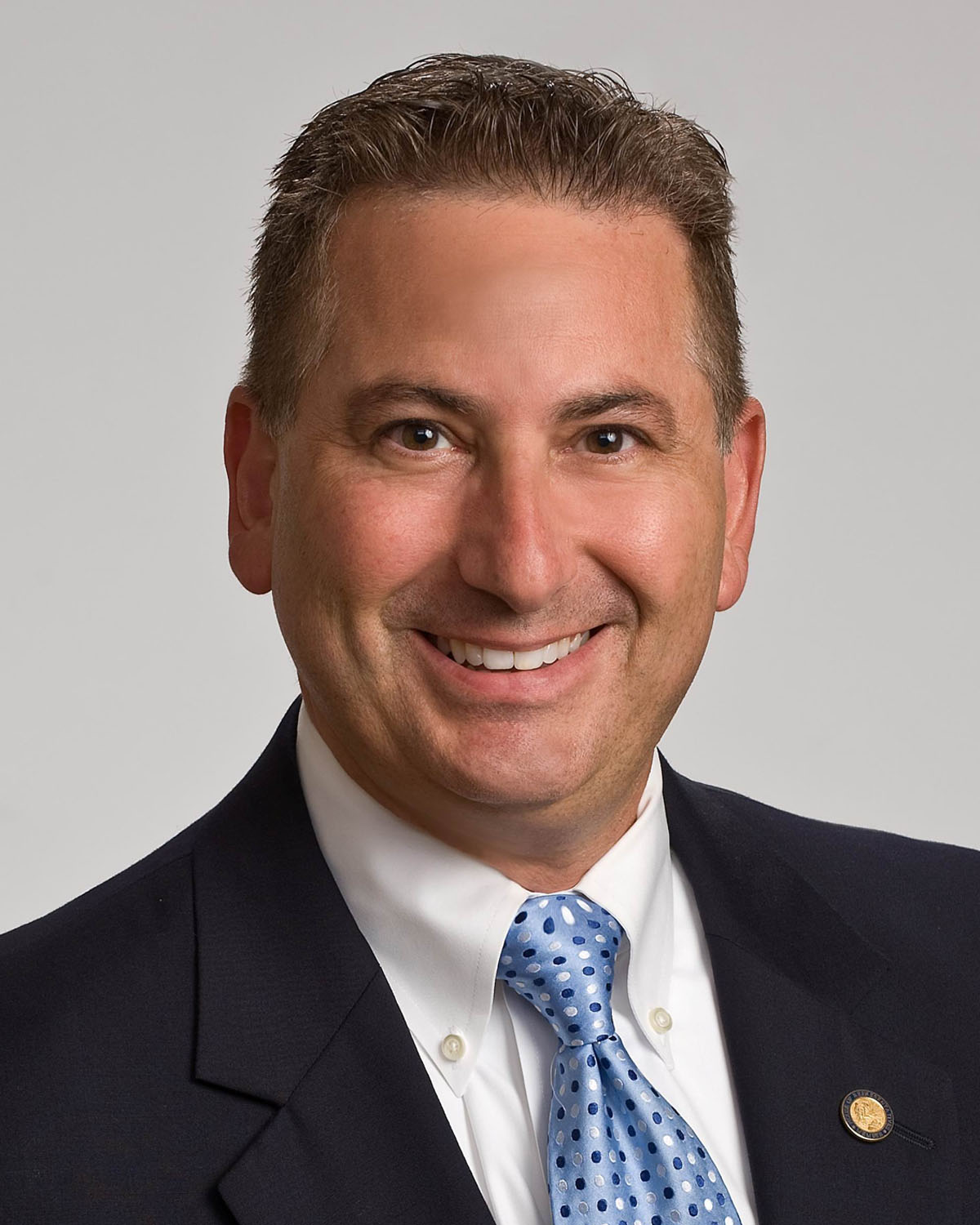

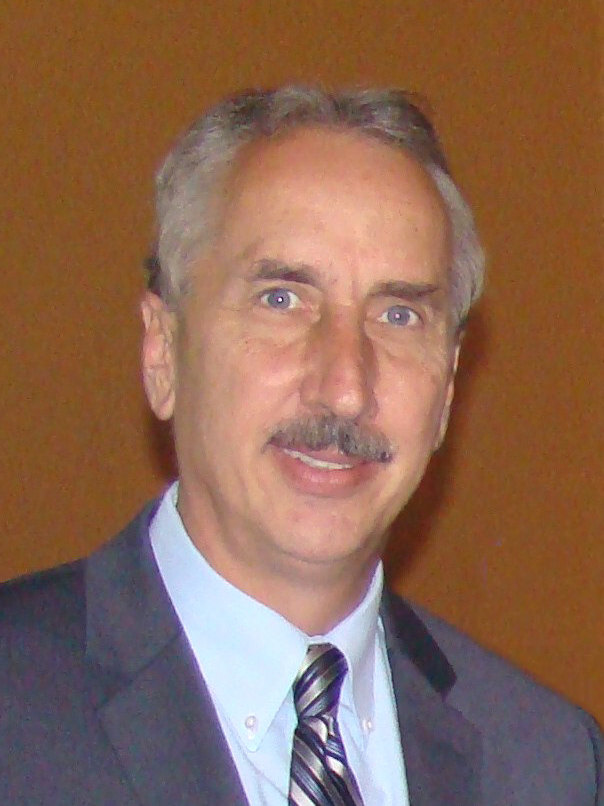
Candidate	Rick Kriseman	Rick Baker
Party	Nonpartisan	Nonpartisan
First-round vote	27,322	27,253
First-round percentage	48.4%	48.2%
Second-round vote	34,531	32,341
Second-round percentage	51.6%	48.4%
- Runoff precinct results Kriseman: 50–60% 60–70% 70–80% 80–90% Baker: 50–60% 60–70% Tie: 50% No votes
Mayor before election
Rick Kriseman
Democratic
Elected mayor
Rick Kriseman
Democratic

St. Petersburg, Florida, held a general election for mayor on August 29 and November 7, 2017, with a primary election which took place on August 29, 2017. Incumbent mayor Rick Kriseman, a Democrat, opted to seek re-election. His opponent in the runoff was Republican former mayor Rick Baker (2001–2010). The election was officially non-partisan.

Incumbent Rick Kriseman won re-election.

== Background ==
In the 2013 election, then incumbent mayor Bill Foster opted to seek re-election for that year's mayoral election. With no candidates having a majority in the primary election, Foster and former Florida House of Representatives member Rick Kriseman faced off in the general election, where Kriseman was elected on November 5, 2013, by a 10-point margin. He assumed office on January 2, 2014.

== Candidates ==
=== Declared ===
In December 2016, advocate and singer-songwriter Paul Congemi announced his bid for mayor. In January 2017, current incumbent mayor Rick Kriseman filed for re-election. In March 2017, African People's Socialist Party activist Jesse Nevel filed for election, as well as Anthony Cates II, a salesman. In May 2017, former St. Petersburg mayor Rick Baker filed for re-election, and Ernisa Barnwell also filed. In June 2017, activist Theresa Lassiter announced her bid for mayoral office.

==== Polling ====
Poll source	Date(s) administered	Sample size	Margin of error	Rick Kriseman	Rick Baker	Anthony Cates	Jesse Nevel	Paul Congemi	Theresa Lassiter	Ernisa Barnwell	Undecided
St. Pete Polls	June 28, 2016	620	±3.9%	36.1%	37.3%	—N/a	—N/a	—N/a	—N/a	—N/a	26.6%
St. Pete Polls	December 12, 2016	1,100	±3.0%	35.1%	43.8%	—N/a	—N/a	—N/a	—N/a	—N/a	21.1%
St. Pete Polls	January 30, 2017	892	±3.3%	37.3%	46.5%	—N/a	—N/a	—N/a	—N/a	—N/a	16.3%
St. Pete Polls	May 16, 2017	1,237	±2.8%	33.2%	46.4%	—N/a	—N/a	—N/a	—N/a	—N/a	20.4%

== Primary campaigns ==
Seven candidates ended up filing for the mayoral office before the cut-off date on June 23. The front-runners were incumbent mayor Kriseman and former mayor Baker, with minor candidates including Nevel, Lassiter, Cates, Congemi, and Barnwell.

At the start of each campaign, Kriseman focused on the continuation of progress which included financing and construction of a new police headquarters and St. Petersburg Pier, poverty, and keeping the Tampa Bay Rays in the city. Baker aimed to win voters with his past management reputation, rebuilding the Sundial, and the Major League Soccer bid for the Tampa Bay Rowdies. Minor candidates such as Nevel and Lassiter vowed to focus on poverty and on St. Petersburg's southern historical black community.

Upon announcement of his re-election bid, Kriseman received endorsements from congressman Charlie Crist, U.S. senator Bill Nelson, the Sun Coast Police Benevolent Association, and four city council members in March.

On June 27, Kriseman and Baker participated in a debate which centered on local issues and questions as well as past campaigns.

On July 10, Barnwell was disqualified from the race due to a bounced check upon applying for candidacy. On the same day, the second public mayoral debate was held between both major candidates—Kriseman and Baker—and minor candidates—Nevel, Lassiter, Cates, Congemi, and Barnwell—on issues involving the economy is south St. Petersburg, the police department, and homelessness before being halted by protesters. In the latter, mayoral candidate Congemi went viral after a comment he made on July 18 during a mayoral forum towards another mayoral candidate Nevel and his supporters.

On August 9, Ernisa Barnwell was officially disqualified from the mayoral race after a judge dismissed her injunction.

Throughout the primary election, Baker was endorsed by the Tampa Bay Times, various pastors in St. Petersburg, as well as realtors. In August, Kriseman was endorsed by Barack Obama.

=== Polling ===
Poll source	Date(s) administered	Sample size	Margin of error	Rick Kriseman (incumbent)	Rick Baker	Anthony Cates	Jesse Nevel	Paul Congemi	Theresa Lassiter	Ernisa Barnwell	Undecided
St. Pete Polls	June 27, 2017	754	±3.6%	38.8%	43.5%	2.0%	2.1%	1.7%	3.0%	0%	8.9%
St. Pete Polls	July 17, 2017	1,011	±3.1%	37.7%	45.7%	1.7%	1.4%	2.8%	3.1%	—N/a	7.6%
St. Pete Polls	August 7, 2017	862	±3.3%	39.3%	45.7%	1.4%	1.6%	3.9%	2.7%	—N/a	5.3%
St. Pete Polls	August 23, 2017	1,524	±2.5%	40.3%	46.7%	0.8%	2.0%	2.4%	1.8%	—N/a	5.9%

=== Primary results ===
Kriseman and Baker obtained the most votes of any the candidates during the August 29 primary, and both advanced to a second election on November 7, as neither got the majority vote needed to avoid a runoff election. The day after the primary took place, it was reported that Kriseman took 48.36 percent of the vote, or 27,322 votes with all 92 precincts reporting. Baker, a former two-term mayor, won 27,253 or 48.23 percent. Kriseman's win in the actual primary vote was unexpected, since opinion polls conducted before the election showed Baker with not only a wide lead, but enough potential to win over enough voters needed to cross the 50 percent majority threshold; at his post-election party, Baker gave a speech claiming prematurely that he had won the primary as well.

Primary election results
Party	Candidate	Votes	%
Nonpartisan	Rick Kriseman (incumbent)	27,322	48.36
Nonpartisan	Rick Baker	27,253	48.23
Nonpartisan	Jesse Nevel	944	1.67
Nonpartisan	Theresa Lassiter	408	0.72
Nonpartisan	Anthony Cates III	387	0.68
Nonpartisan	Paul Congemi	187	0.33
Total votes		56,501	99.99

== General election ==
At the beginning of the general election on September 6, both Kriseman and Baker temporarily suspended their campaigns to prepare for Hurricane Irma.

General election results
Party	Candidate	Votes	%
Nonpartisan	Rick Kriseman (incumbent)	34,531	51.64
Nonpartisan	Rick Baker	32,341	48.36
Total votes		66,872	—
