= 2013 St. Petersburg, Florida mayoral election =

- August 27, 2013 (first round); November 5, 2013 (runoff)
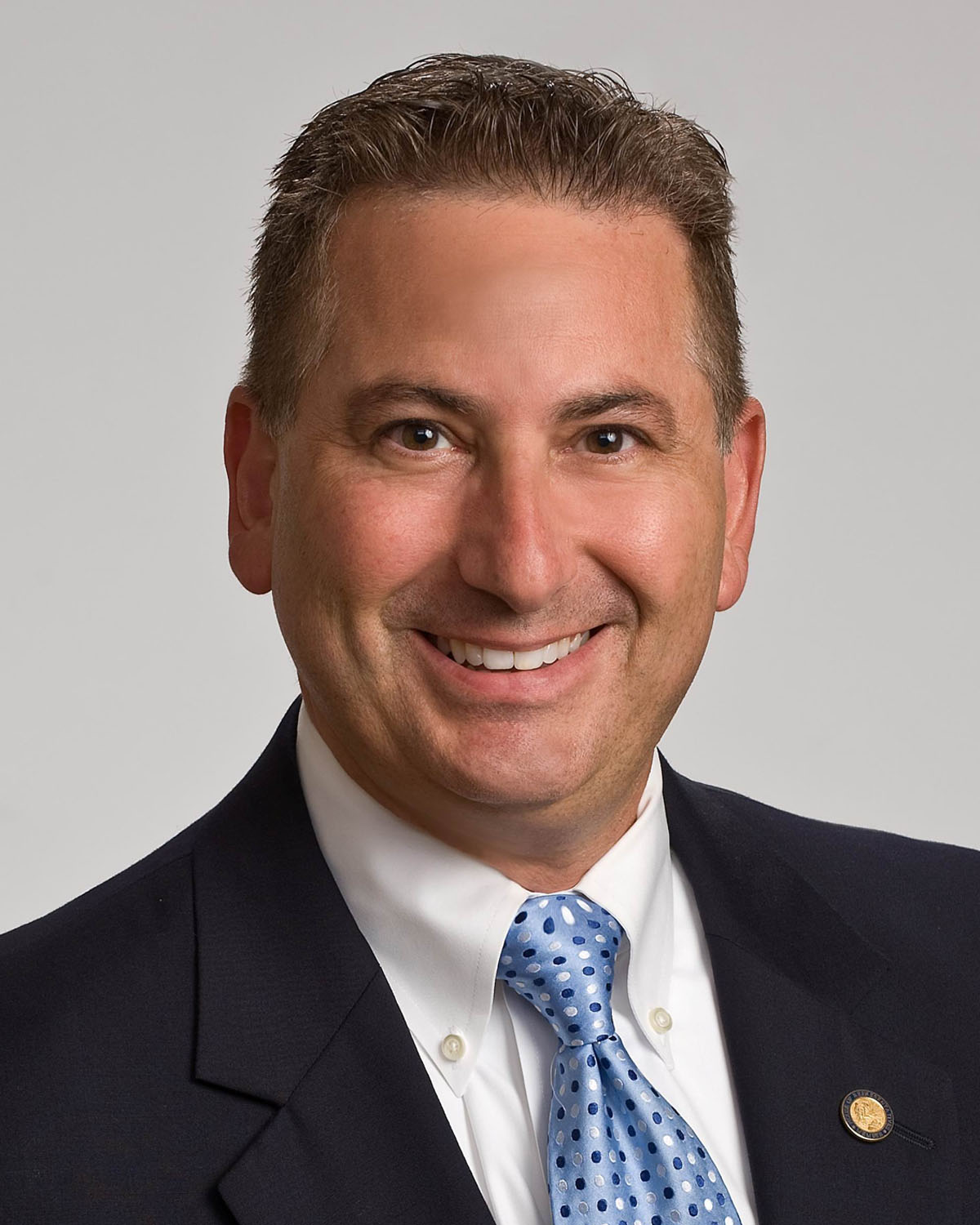

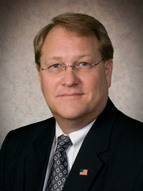

Candidate	Rick Kriseman	Bill Foster	Kathleen Ford
Party	Nonpartisan	Nonpartisan	Nonpartisan
First round	19,470; 38.90%	20,336; 40.63%	9,648; 19.27%
Runoff	29,701; 55.90%	23,427; 44.10%	Eliminated
Mayor before election
Bill Foster
Republican
Elected Mayor
Rick Kriseman
Democratic

St. Petersburg, Florida, held an election for mayor on August 27 and November 5, 2013. A non-partisan primary election was held on August 27, 2013. No candidate won a majority of the vote, so the top two finishers, incumbent Mayor Bill Foster and former State Representative Rick Kriseman, advanced to a runoff.

After a campaign described as "nasty", "partisan", "contentious" and "the costliest in [St. Petersburg] history", Foster lost to Kriseman by 56% to 44%, becoming the first incumbent mayor of St. Petersburg to lose a race for re-election in more than 26 years.

Adam C. Smith of the Tampa Bay Times wrote that although 70% of voters approved of where the city was heading and Foster was "a good man who presided over no corruption scandal, no violent racial unrest", he only proved to be "adequate" at the job. He also "underestimat[ed] voters' intelligence, talking about a secret plan to keep the Tampa Bay Rays in St. Petersburg", had an "ever-shifting" position on the St. Petersburg Pier and alienated African-American voters in Midtown. Kriseman, Smith wrote, capitalized on this to win "considerable" African-American support and ran as a "safe, credible alternative for those unimpressed with the incumbent", promising to govern like popular former Mayor Rick Baker.

== Primary election ==
=== Candidates ===
- Anthony Cates III
- Paul Congemi, candidate for mayor in 2009
- Kathleen Ford, former city council member (Democrat)
- Bill Foster, incumbent mayor (Republican)
- Rick Kriseman, former state representative (Democrat)

=== Polling ===
Poll source	Date(s) administered	Sample size	Margin of error	Bill Foster (R)	Rick Kriseman (D)	Undecided
St. Pete Polls	February 18, 2013	690	± 3.4%	38%	34%	28%

=== Results ===
2013 St. Petersburg, Florida, mayoral primary election
Party	Candidate	Votes	%
Nonpartisan	Bill Foster (inc.)	20,336	40.63%
Nonpartisan	Rick Kriseman	19,470	38.90%
Nonpartisan	Kathleen Ford	9,648	19.27%
Nonpartisan	Anthony Cates III	376	0.75%
Nonpartisan	Paul Congemi	225	0.45%
Total votes		50,055	100.00%

=== Endorsements ===
Bill Foster

Elected Officials

- Rick Scott, Governor of Florida

Organizations

- Pinellas Realtor Organization
- Tampa Tribune
Rick Kriseman

Elected Officials

- Charlie Crist, former Republican Governor of Florida and Independent Candidate for Senate in 2010
- Leslie Curran, St. Petersburg city council member
- Paula Dockery, former Republican state senator
- Dwight Dudley, state representative
- Patricia Gerard, Mayor of Largo
- Charlie Gerdes, St. Petersburg city council member
- Charlie Justice, Pinellas County Commissioner
- Steve Kornell, St. Petersburg city council member
- Susan Latvala, Pinellas County Commissioner
- Janet Long, Pinellas County Commissioner
- Bill Nelson, US Senator
- Karl Nurse, St. Petersburg city council member
- Darryl Rouson, state representative
- Alex Sink, former Chief Financial Officer and nominee for Governor in 2010

Organizations

- Tampa Bay Times

== Runoff election ==
=== Polling ===
Poll source	Date(s) administered	Sample size	Margin of error	Bill Foster (R)	Rick Kriseman (D)	Undecided
St. Pete Polls	October 24, 2013	1,397	± 2.6%	42.6%	48.3%	9%
Braun Research	October 17–21, 2013	809	± 3.4%	34%	40%	19%
Braun Research	September 14–16, 2013	410	± 4.8%	39%	40%	16%

=== Results ===
2013 St. Petersburg, Florida, mayoral general election
Party	Candidate	Votes	%
Nonpartisan	Rick Kriseman	29,701	55.90%
Nonpartisan	Bill Foster (inc.)	23,427	44.10%
Total votes		53,128	100.00%
