= Margo Fischer =

American politician (1946–2005)

Member of the Florida House of Representatives from the 52nd district
- In office November 5, 1996 – November 3, 1998
- Preceded by: Peter R. Wallace
- Succeeded by: Frank Farkas

Personal details
- Born: October 29, 1946 Youngstown, Ohio
- Died: October 7, 2005 (aged 58) South Pasadena, Florida
- Party: Democratic
- Spouse: David J. Fischer (m. 1986)
- Children: 4
- Education: Eckerd College (B.A.)
- Occupation: Investment banker

Margo Fischer (October 29, 1946 – October 7, 2005) was a Democratic politician from Florida who served as a member of the Florida House of Representatives from the 52nd district from 1996 to 1998.

== Early life ==
Fischer was born in Youngstown, Ohio, in 1946, and moved to St. Petersburg, Florida in 1956, where she grew up. She worked as a secretary for a municipal bond company, eventually becoming vice president, and attended Eckerd College. In 1986, she married David J. Fischer, who would later serve as mayor of St. Petersburg from 1991 to 2001.

== Florida House of Representatives ==
In 1996, when State House Speaker Peter R. Wallace declined to seek re-election, Fischer ran to succeed him in the 52nd district. She faced former St. Petersburg City Councilwoman Martha Maddux in the Democratic primary, whom she narrowly defeated, winning the nomination by 21 votes. In the general election, she ran against chiropractor Frank Farkas, the Republican nominee. She narrowly defeated Farkas, winning 52 percent of the vote to his 48 percent.

Fischer ran for re-election in 1998, and was again opposed by Farkas. This time, he won, receiving 53 percent of the vote to her 47 percent.

In 2000, Fischer challenged Farkas again. She lost by a wider margin, winning 44 percent of the vote to his 56 percent.

== Death ==
Fischer died on October 7, 2005.
