= Frank Farkas =

American politician (born 1956)

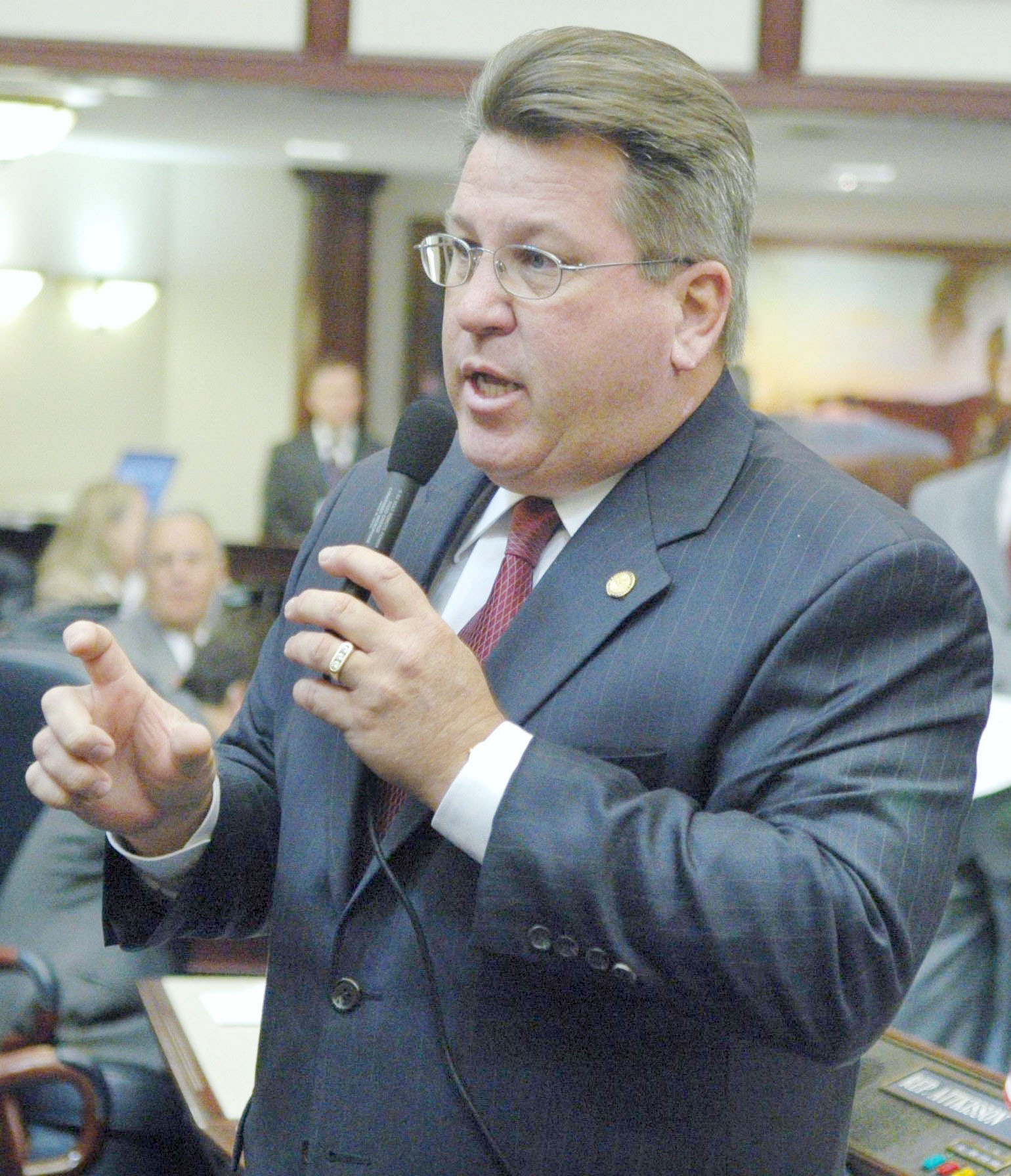

Member of the Florida House of Representatives from the 52nd district
- In office November 3, 1998 – November 7, 2006
- Preceded by: Margo Fischer
- Succeeded by: Bill Heller

Personal details
- Born: May 17, 1956 (age 70) Milwaukee, Wisconsin
- Party: Republican
- Spouse: Toni Lee Witkowski
- Children: 2
- Education: St. Petersburg Junior College (A.A.); Palmer College of Chiropractic (D.C.); Eckerd College (B.A.)
- Occupation: Chiropractic physician

Frank Farkas (born May 17, 1956) is a Republican politician from Florida who served as a member of the Florida House of Representatives from the 52nd district from 1998 to 2006.

== Early life ==
Farkas was born in Milwaukee, Wisconsin, in 1956, and moved to Florida in 1972. He graduated from St. Petersburg Catholic High School and later attended St. Petersburg Junior College, graduating with his associate's degree in 1976. Farkas then attended the Palmer College of Chiropractic in Davenport, Iowa, graduating in 1979. He practiced as a chiropractic physician in St. Petersburg, Florida, and opened his own practice in 1981. Farkas graduated from Eckerd College with a bachelor's degree in health management in 1993.

== Florida House of Representatives ==
In 1996, Farkas ran for the Florida House of Representatives from the 52nd district, but lost to Democrat Margo Fischer, winning 48 percent of the vote to her 52 percent. He ran against Fischer again in 1998, and narrowly defeated her with 53 percent of the vote.

Fischer challenged him in 2000, and he defeated her with 56 percent of the vote. He ran for re-election in 2002, and was challenged by Democrat Chris Eaton, a businessman. Farkas ultimately won re-election, receiving 53 percent of the vote to Eaton's 44 percent, and Libertarian Alison Lipscomb's 4 percent.

In 2004, Farkas ran for a fourth term in the House. He was opposed by Democrat Liz McCallum, a political consultant. Both parties targeted the race, and Farkas defeated McCallum, winning 53 percent of the vote to her 47 percent.

== 2006 State Senate campaign ==
Farkas was unable to seek re-election to the State House in 2006 because of term limits, and instead ran to succeed Republican State Senator Jim Sebesta in the 16th district. He faced fellow State Representative Kim Berfield in the Republican primary. Following a contentious campaign, Farkas lost to her, winning 41 percent of the vote to her 59 percent.

== Post-legislative career ==
In 2012, when State Representative Jeff Brandes opted to run for the Florida Senate rather than seek re-election, Farkas ran to succeed him in the newly drawn 68th district. He faced Daryle Hamel in the Republican primary, which he won with 75 percent of the vote, and advanced to the general election with attorney Dwight Dudley, the Democratic nominee. Farkas lost to Dudley, winning 44 percent of the vote to Dudley's 51 percent and independent Matthew Weidner's 5 percent.

Farkas considered running to succeed Dudley in 2016, but ultimately declined to run.
