= Samantha Scott (politician) =

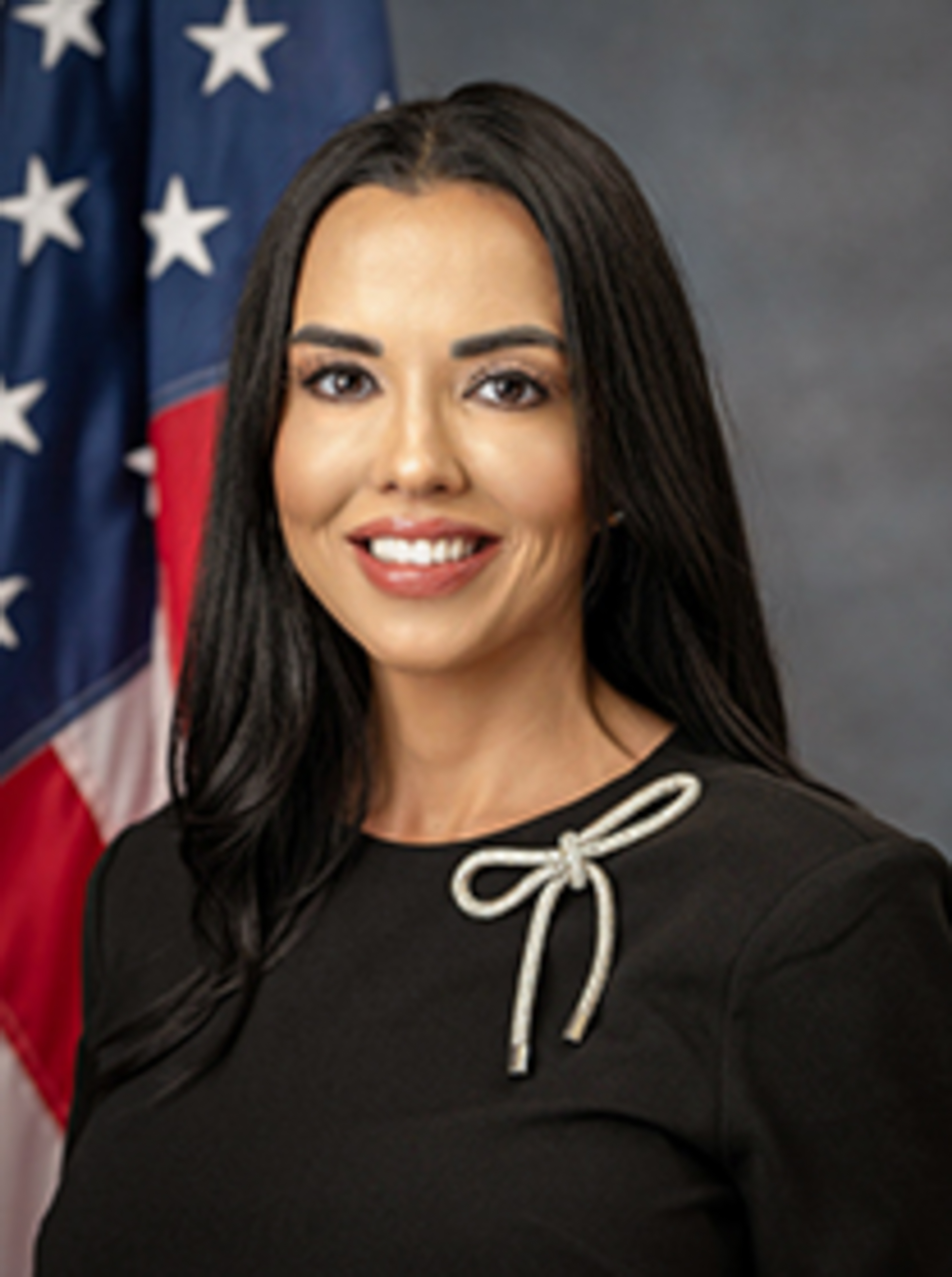

Member of the Florida House of Representatives from the 52nd district
- Incumbent
- Assumed office March 25, 2026
- Preceded by: John Temple

Personal details
- Party: Republican

Samantha Scott is an American politician who has represented the 52nd district in the Florida House of Representatives. She was elected to the seat in 2026 without opposition.

== Political career ==
In June 2025, Florida Governor Ron DeSantis appointed Scott to the Lake–Sumter State College District Board of Trustees.

Republican John Temple resigned from representing Florida's 52nd House of Representatives district on September 18, 2025, after being named president of Lake–Sumter State College. Scott ran in the special election for the remainder of Temple's term as a Republican. As no other candidates filed to run, the election, scheduled for March 24, 2026, was cancelled, with Scott elected by default on that date.

== Electoral history ==
2026 Florida's 52nd House of Representatives district special election
Party	Candidate	Votes	%
Republican	Samantha Scott	Unopposed	
Total votes		—N/a	100.0

== Personal life ==
Scott is a lifelong resident of Sumter County, Florida.
