= John Temple (Florida politician) =

American politician

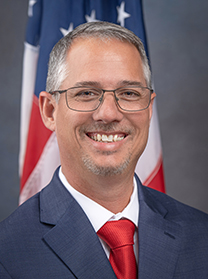

Member of the Florida House of Representatives from the 52nd district
- In office November 8, 2022 – September 18, 2025
- Preceded by: Thad Altman (redistricting)
- Succeeded by: Samantha Scott

Personal details
- Born: May 11, 1976 (age 50) Texas, U.S.
- Party: Republican
- Children: 2
- Education: Southeastern University (BS); Nova Southeastern University (MS)

John Paul Temple (born May 11, 1976) is an American politician and educator who served as a member of the Florida House of Representatives for the 52nd district. He assumed office on November 8, 2022.

== Early life and education ==
Temple was born in Texas in 1976 and moved with his family to Florida in 1981. He earned a Bachelor of Science degree in math education from Southeastern University and a Master of Science in education leadership from Nova Southeastern University.

== Career ==
Temple began his career as a math teacher at McKeel Academy of Technology. He later became a school administrator, working as an assistant principal, principal, and director of professional learning and accountability for the Sumter District Schools. Temple was elected to the Florida House of Representatives in Florida's 52nd House of Representatives district in November 2022. He resigned in September 2025 after being named president of Lake–Sumter State College.
