= Bill Foster (mayor) =

American politician

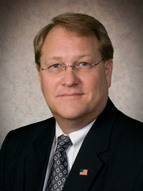

Mayor of St. Petersburg
- In office January 2, 2010 – January 2, 2014
- Preceded by: Rick Baker
- Succeeded by: Rick Kriseman

Personal details
- Born: David William Foster; March 31, 1963 (age 63) St. Petersburg, Florida, U.S.
- Party: Republican
- Spouse: Wendy Holt
- Education: Samford University (BA, JD)

David William Foster (born March 31, 1963) is an American attorney and former mayor of St. Petersburg, Florida. He was elected in 2009. Before being elected mayor Foster served on the city council and worked as a lawyer.

A fourth generation St. Petersburg native, Foster attended Northeast High School, Samford University and the Cumberland School of Law at Samford University. As mayor, Foster advocated for replacing the St. Petersburg Pier with a new structure. Foster ran for re-election in 2013, but lost to Democrat Rick Kriseman.

== Early law career and membership on city council ==
Foster worked as an attorney specializing in probate, estates and trusts, real estate, commercial law, real estate and commercial litigation. Foster spent 10 years on the City Council. He was originally appointed to a vacant seat in 1998, and re-elected for two consecutive terms in 1999 and 2003. He served as Council Chair in 2004 and 2006. Foster also served on the Friends of Weedon Island, NAACP, the Pinellas Assembly, Pinellas County Annexation Task Force, Suncoasters of St. Petersburg, Sunken Gardens Tax Force, the St. Petersburg History Museum, and St. Petersburg Vision 2020.

== Mayor of St. Petersburg ==
Mayor Foster puts forth a platform of "Seven S's", which he defines as seamlessness, safety, sustainability, service, small business, schools, and sports, arts, and culture. He helped recruit the St. Petersburg's first season of International Baseball to the city's Al Lang Stadium, with teams from Korea, Canada and the Netherlands competing during February and March, 2011. He also helped lead development of a regional homeless facility operated by the Pinellas County Sheriff's Office, called Pinellas Safe Harbor. During his first term in office, St. Petersburg welcomed the new Chihuly Collection and a new $36 million Salvador Dalí Museum. For three consecutive years (2010, 2011, and 2012), St. Petersburg was ranked as the No. 1 Arts Destination among mid-sized cities by American Style magazine.

== Personal life ==
Foster is married to Wendy Holt Foster, both parents of two children.

Political offices
Preceded by Rick Baker	Mayor of St. Petersburg; 2010–2014	Succeeded by Rick Kriseman
