= 2005 St. Petersburg, Florida, mayoral election =

- November 9, 2005
- Turnout: 20.56%
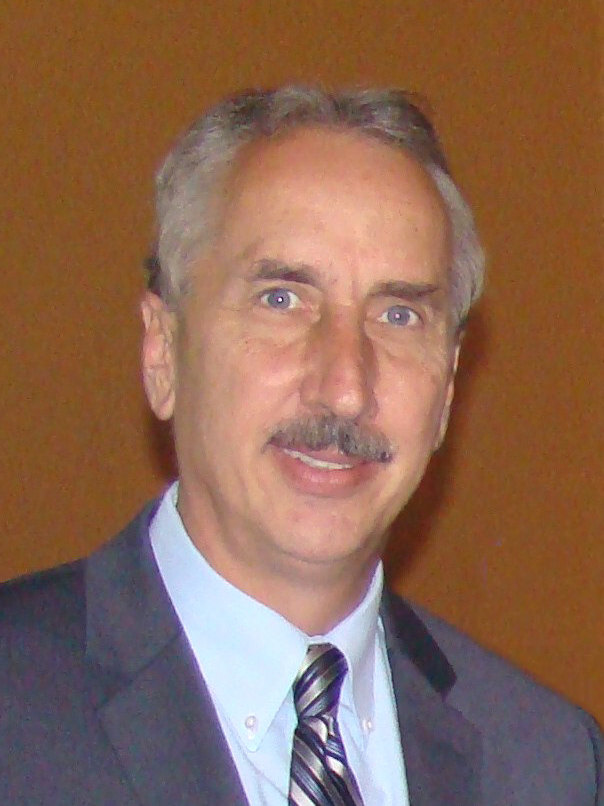

| Candidate | Rick Baker | Ed Helm |
| Party | Nonpartisan | Nonpartisan |
| Popular vote | 22,785 | 9,582 |
| Percentage | 70.40% | 29.60% |
Mayor before election
Rick Baker
Republican
Elected Mayor
Rick Baker
Republican

The 2005 St. Petersburg, Florida, mayoral election took place on November 9, 2005. Incumbent Mayor Rick Baker, who was first elected in 2001, ran for re-election to a second term. He was challenged by retired lawyer Ed Helm. Baker defeated Helm in a landslide, winning re-election with 70 percent of the vote.

== Candidates ==
- Rick Baker, incumbent Mayor
- Ed Helm, retired lawyer and curbside recycling advocate

== Results ==
2005 St. Petersburg, Florida, mayoral general election
| Party | Candidate | Votes | % |
|---|---|---|---|
| Nonpartisan | Rick Baker (inc.) | 22,785 | 70.40% |
| Nonpartisan | Ed Helm | 9,582 | 29.60% |
| Total votes | | 32,367 | 100.00% |
