= David J. Fischer =

American politician (1933–2025)

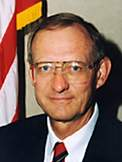

Mayor of St. Petersburg, Florida
- In office April 1, 1991 – April 1, 2001
- Preceded by: Bob Ulrich
- Succeeded by: Rick Baker

Personal details
- Born: July 24, 1933 Evanston, Illinois
- Died: October 22, 2025 (aged 92) St. Petersburg, Florida
- Party: Republican
- Spouses: Tina (divorced); Margo Fischer (m. 1986; died 2005)
- Children: 3
- Education: Duke University (B.A.)
- Occupation: Financial consultant, municipal bond dealer

Military service
- Allegiance: United States
- Branch/service: United States Air Force
- Years of service: 1956–1958

David J. Fischer (July 24, 1933 – October 22, 2025) was a Republican politician from Florida who served as Mayor of St. Petersburg, Florida from 1991 to 2001.

Fischer was born in Evanston, Illinois, in 1933, and attended Duke University, graduating with his bachelor's degree in business in 1955. He served in the U.S. Air Force from 1956 to 1958, and moved to St. Petersburg, Florida, in 1960, where he worked as a financial consultant. He was elected to the City Council in 1975, and served until 1979.

In 1991, Fischer was elected mayor, and he was sworn in on April 1, 1991. He was re-elected in 1993 and 1997 as the city's first "strong" mayor, and declined to seek re-election in 2001, when he was succeeded by Rick Baker, his advisor.

Fischer's second wife, Margo, served in the Florida House of Representatives from 1996 to 1998. Though Fischer was a registered Republican, Margo was elected as a Democrat.

Fischer died on October 22, 2025.
