= Rick Kriseman =

American politician

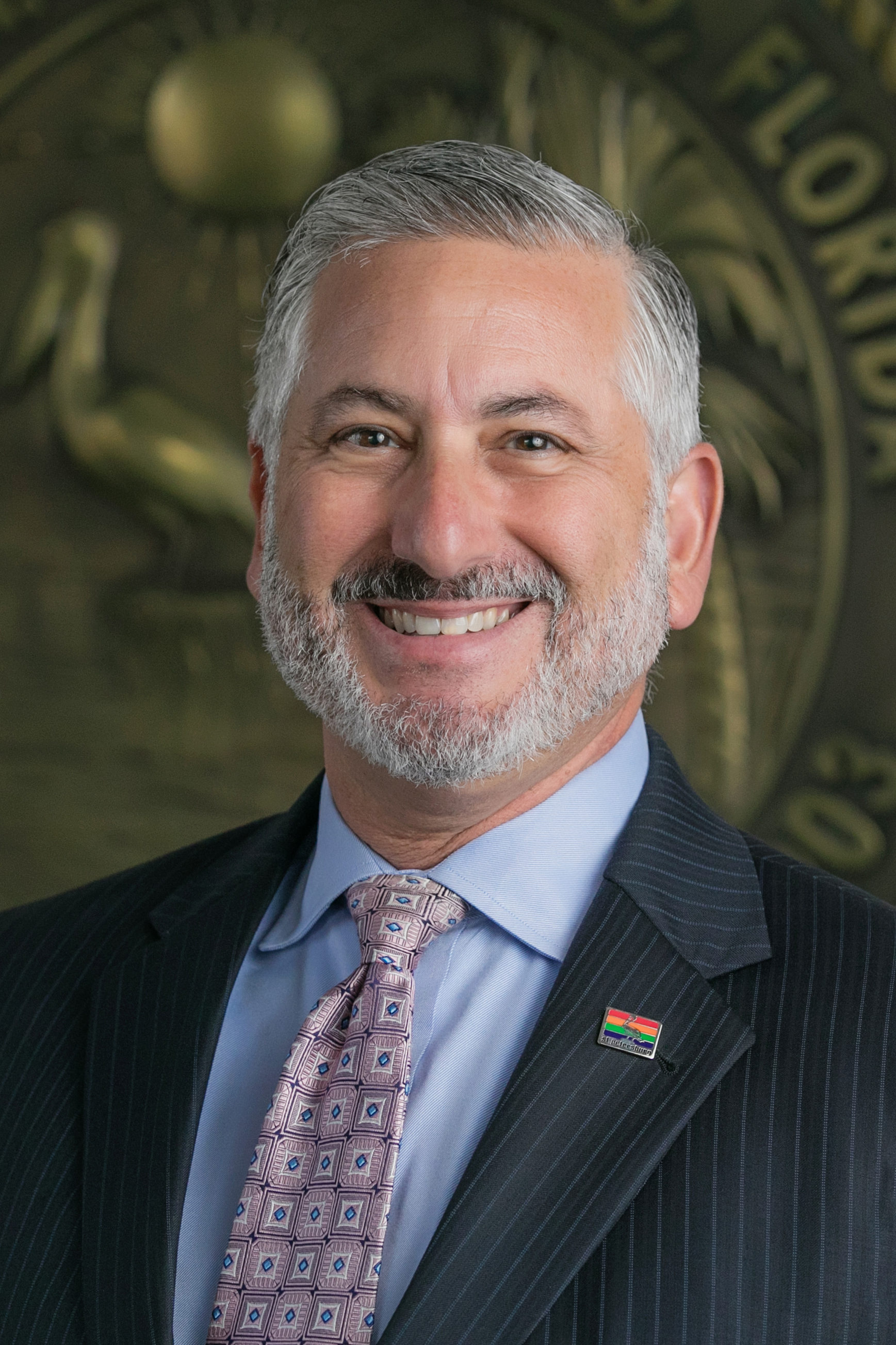
- Official mayoral portrait, 2018

Mayor of St. Petersburg
- In office January 2, 2014 – January 6, 2022
- Preceded by: Bill Foster
- Succeeded by: Ken Welch

Member of the Florida House of Representatives from the 53rd district
- In office September 5, 2006 – November 7, 2012
- Preceded by: Charlie Justice
- Succeeded by: John Tobia

Member of the St. Petersburg City Council from the 1st district
- In office 2000–2006
- Preceded by: Robert Kersteen
- Succeeded by: Herbert Polson

Personal details
- Born: Richard David Kriseman; August 2, 1962 (age 64) Detroit, Michigan, U.S.
- Party: Democratic
- Spouse: Kerry Kriseman
- Children: 2
- Education: University of Florida (BA); Stetson University (JD)
- Website: Official website Government website

Richard David Kriseman (born August 2, 1962) is an American politician who served as the 53rd Mayor of St. Petersburg from 2014 to 2022. A member of the Democratic Party, he previously served as a member of the Florida House of Representatives, representing the 53rd district from 2006 to 2012.

== Early life, education, and legal career ==
Kriseman was born in Detroit, Michigan, and moved with his family to Florida in 1972. He attended Boca Ciega High School in Gulfport. He graduated from the University of Florida with a bachelor's degree in broadcasting in 1984. He then attended the Stetson University College of Law, receiving his Juris Doctor in 1987. He was active in local politics, serving as a charter member of the Lake Pasadena Neighborhood Association and working as State Representative Lars Hafner's campaign manager.

As a lawyer, he practiced law with Englander & Fischer, P.A. and Stolba, Englander & Shames, P.A. From 2007 to 2011 he was an attorney with Saunders & Walker P.A. From 2011 to 2013, he was an attorney with Lucas, Green & Magazine.

== Political career ==
He served on the St. Petersburg Nuisance Abatement Board in 1996.

=== St. Petersburg City Council ===
Kriseman ran for a seat on the St. Petersburg City Council in 1999, challenging incumbent City Councilman Robert Kersteen. Though voter turnout was low, the city's purchase of the Sunken Gardens, which was on the ballot as a referendum, increased voter enthusiasm about the election and Kriseman lost to Kersteen by a wide margin, receiving 41% of the vote to Kersteen's 59%. When Kersteen resigned from the City Council to unsuccessfully run for the State House in 2000, Kriseman was appointed to replace him. Several months later he ran for re-election in 2001, just and faced Dennis Homol Sr., a wastewater treatment plant mechanic. Kriseman campaigned on his plans to raise the city's quality of life by promoting economic development and effective law enforcement, and expressed his support for an ordinance to ease regulations for homeowners seeking to add bedrooms to their homes, while Homol campaigned on his support for building desalination plants. Kriseman won re-election over Homol in a landslide, winning 76% of the vote to Homol's 24%.

He ran for re-election in 2003, facing challenger Homol once again, who attacked Kriseman and the City Council for being too friendly and not debating enough. Kriseman disputed Homol's assertion, pointing out that he regularly voted against Mayor Rick Baker, specifically when he voted against a mayoral pay raise and when he voted for allowing alcohol sales on Sundays. He campaigned on a "progressive" vision for the city, which included support for "pedestrian safe zones, land-banking, live Internet access to council meetings and creative use of swimming pools such as holding "dog paddles" so people can bring their pets to swim," noting that government can be "about creating opportunities for fun, too." Once again, Kriseman won re-election overwhelmingly over Homol, and received 76% of the vote again.

=== Florida House of Representatives ===
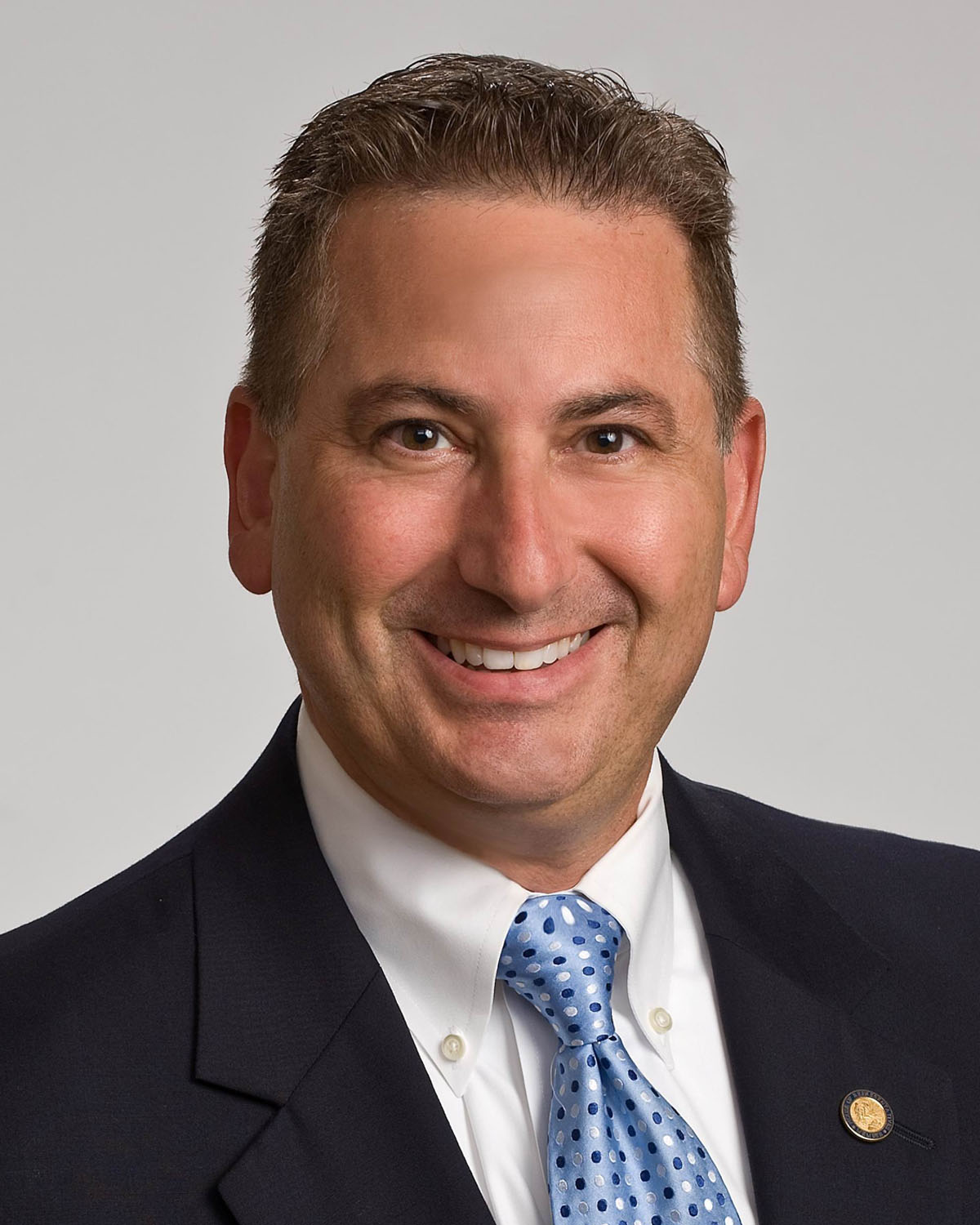
Official legislative portrait, 2010

When incumbent State Representative Charlie Justice opted to run for the Florida Senate rather than seek re-election, Kriseman ran to succeed him in the 53rd District, which included parts of Gulfport, Lealman, Pinellas Park, and St. Petersburg in southern Pinellas County. He was challenged in the Democratic primary by commercial attorney Charlie Gerdes. Kriseman and Gerdes both campaigned positively throughout the election, with both candidates agreeing on education and property insurance. Kriseman, however, emphasized his progressive credentials, noting that he was "socially liberal," and expressed his support for higher teacher pay, smaller classroom sizes, mandatory community service for high school students, and the Save our Homes cap. Ultimately, Kriseman ended up defeating Gerdes by a wide margin, receiving 64% of the vote to Gerdes' 36%, and advanced to the general election, where he faced Thomas Piccolo, the Republican nominee and a former student body president at University of South Florida St. Petersburg. Kriseman and Piccolo both emphasized their legislative experience, with Kriseman drawing upon his tenure on the City Council's Legislative Affairs and Intergovernmental Affairs Committee, where he pushed for legislation that would benefit the city. Owing to the liberal nature of the district, the contest was not close, and Kriseman won his first term easily, receiving 60% of the vote to Piccolo's 40%.

During his first term in the legislature, he authored legislation that would have put a $1 tax on strip club admissions to increase Medicaid allowances for seniors from $35 per month to $70 per month and legislation that would have required drivers "to stop at certain intersections when a pedestrian is either in, or steps into, a crosswalk." When the state's no-fault automobile insurance law was set to expire before the legislature could renew it, Kriseman urged then-Governor Charlie Crist to convene a special session to renew the law, but Crist declined to do so.

Kriseman was re-elected without opposition in 2008. In 2010, he won the Democratic primary uncontested, and faced Thomas Cuba, the Republican nominee, in the general election. Cuba did not present a significant challenge to Kriseman, and he won re-election with 59% of the vote. He opted against seeking re-election in 2012, declaring, "I've been in office for 12 years, the last six in Tallahassee, and it's been extremely challenging and frustrating being up there fighting a system that I think is broken. It's time to come home and focus on my family and law practice, and figure out what is next for me in politics."

=== Mayor of St. Petersburg ===
After retiring from the legislature, Kriseman announced that he would challenge incumbent Mayor Bill Foster in the 2013 St. Petersburg mayoral election. Kriseman cited Foster's lack of leadership, the handling of the Tampa Bay Rays' desire to leave Tropicana Field, and issues with the St. Petersburg Pier as reasons for his mayoral run. Former City Councilwoman and two-time mayoral candidate Kathleen Ford, along with minor candidates Anthony Cates and Paul Congemi also joined Kriseman to challenge Foster. Kriseman and Ford attacked Foster for changing his position on a number of issues, while Kriseman was attacked by Ford for not passing any legislation while in the legislature. Ford also questioned whether Kriseman would be partisan as mayor. The Tampa Bay Times, criticizing Foster's "lack of vision and unsure footing," strongly endorsed Kriseman, citing his "stabilizing influence" on the City Council and his focus on "environmental efforts and public education" in the legislature. The Times praised the "new energy" that Kriseman would bring to the mayor's office in negotiating with the Rays, redeveloping the Pier, and improving city services. The Tampa Tribune, meanwhile, though asserting that Foster's term consisted of "four bumpy years," and praising Kriseman for his "command of the issues, which he presents with enthusiasm and energy," endorsed Foster, observing that he presided over an "economic rebirth."

In the primary, Foster narrowly edged out Kriseman to place first, though no candidate received a majority. Foster won 41% of the vote to Kriseman's 39% and Ford's 19%, and Foster and Kriseman advanced to the general election. Once again, the Times endorsed Kriseman, and the Tribune endorsed Foster, while United States Senator Bill Nelson, former Governor Charlie Crist, and six out of eight City Councilmembers endorsed Kriseman. Despite the closeness of the campaign, Kriseman ultimately upset Foster by a fairly solid margin, winning 56% of the vote to Foster's 44%.

In December 2015, Kriseman received media attention after he tweeted about "barring" Donald Trump from entering St. Petersburg, which he did in response to Trump's earlier controversial comment on banning all Muslims from entering the U.S. in the wake of deadly terrorist attacks in Paris and San Bernardino, California.

Kriseman announced that he would run for re-election in the 2017 St. Petersburg mayoral election. In August 2017, Barack Obama endorsed Kriseman for re-election as mayor of St. Petersburg. On November 7, 2017, Kriseman was re-elected for a second term, winning the general election with 51.62% of the vote. He defeated former Republican Mayor Rick Baker, who had 48.38% of the vote in a nonpartisan election.

== Personal life ==
He and his wife Kerry have two children. Kriseman is Jewish.

Political offices
Preceded by Bill Foster	Mayor of St. Petersburg; 2014–2022	Succeeded by Ken Welch
