= Charlie Justice (politician) =

American politician

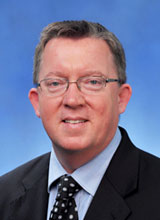

Member of the Pinellas County Commission from the 3rd district
- In office 2012–2024
- Preceded by: Nancy Bostock
- Succeeded by: Vince Nowicki

Member of the Florida Senate from the 16th district
- In office November 7, 2006 – November 2, 2010
- Preceded by: Jim Sebesta
- Succeeded by: Jack Latvala

Member of the Florida House of Representatives from the 53rd district
- In office November 7, 2000 – November 7, 2006
- Preceded by: Lars Hafner
- Succeeded by: Rick Kriseman

Personal details
- Born: July 23, 1968 (age 58) Saint Petersburg, Florida
- Party: Democratic
- Spouse: Kathleen
- Education: Saint Petersburg Junior College, University of South Florida
- Profession: Director, Leadership Programming at USFSP

Charlie Justice (born July 23, 1968) is an American politician from the state of Florida. A member of the Democratic Party, Justice served on the Pinellas County Commission. He was formerly a member of the Florida House of Representatives representing the 53rd district from 2000 to 2006, and the Florida Senate representing the 16th district from 2006 to 2010.

== Career ==
Justice worked as a project coordinator for the University of South Florida St. Petersburg, and as a legislative aide to Lars Hafner, when Hafner represented the 53rd district in the Florida House of Representatives. Justice was elected to the Florida House, representing the 53rd District, in 2000, succeeding Hafner, who could not run for reelection due to term limits. Justice served in the Florida House from 2000 through 2006. He was elected to the Florida Senate, representing the 16th District, in 2006, and was sworn in during 2006.

Justice ran in 2010 as the Democratic nomination for the United States House of Representatives in Florida's 10th congressional district. Justice lost to Republican Party candidate Bill Young

Justice ran for Pinellas County Commission in the 2012 election cycle. He defeated his opponent, incumbent Nancy Bostock. In 2024, he lost his bid for re-election to Vince Nowicki.

== See also ==
- United States House of Representatives elections in Florida, 2010#District 10
