= St. Petersburg Museum of History =

Museum and cultural center in St. Petersburg, Florida, US

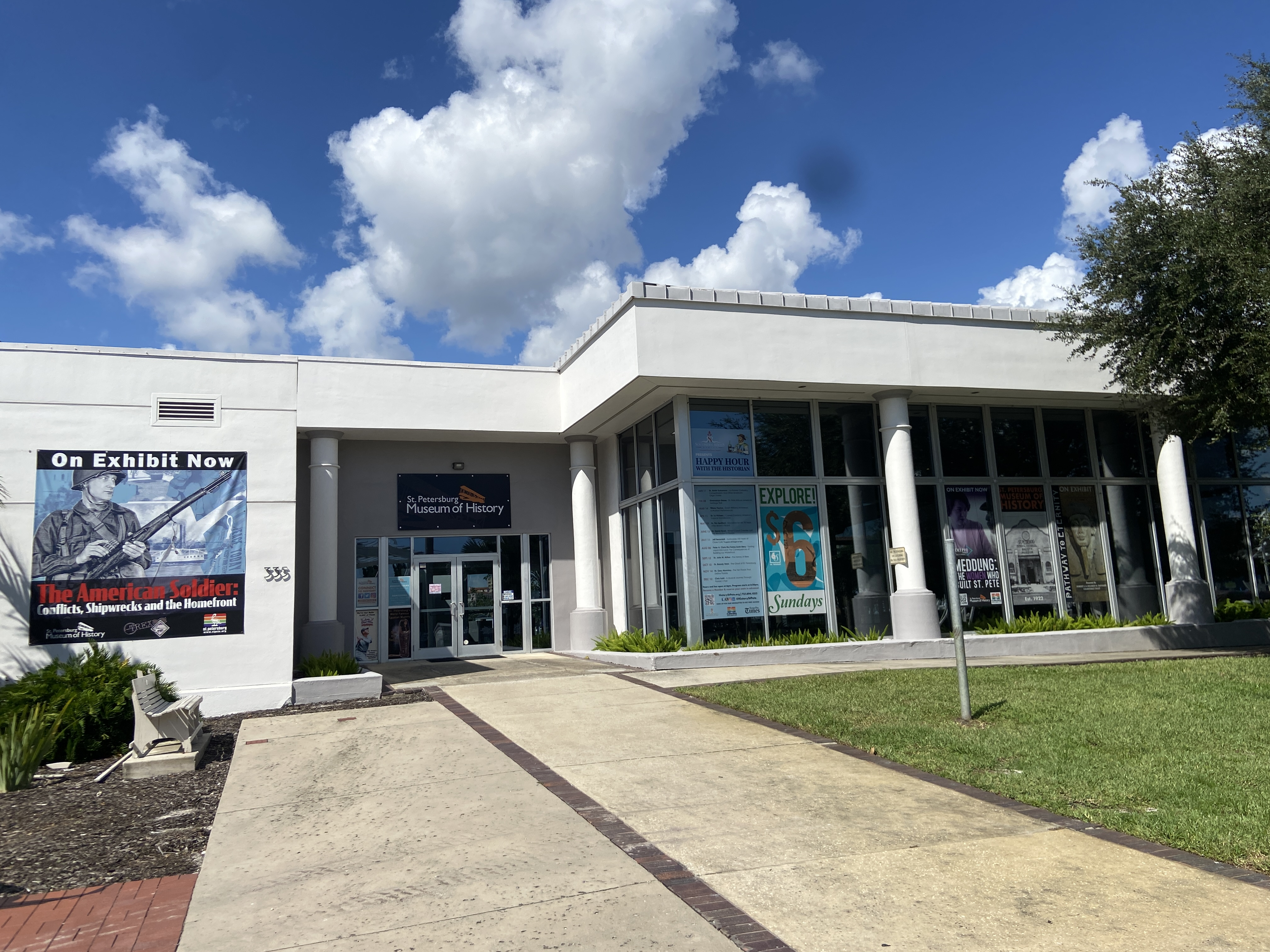
- Entrance to museum
- Established: 1920
- Location: 335 2nd Ave NE, St. Petersburg, Florida
- Coordinates: 27°46′26″N 82°37′50″W
- Type: Local History
- Executive director: Rui Farias
- Website: spmoh.com/

The St. Petersburg Museum of History (SPMOH) is a history museum located in St. Petersburg, Florida, dedicated to covering the area's history. As of 2025, the museum's director is Rui Farias.

== History ==
The museum was founded by Mary Wheeler Eaton in 1920 as the St. Petersburg Memorial Historical Society. The city of St. Petersburg granted the organization the site after the 1921 Tampa Bay hurricane destroyed the aquarium standing on the land. It is the oldest museum in Pinellas County. The mission of the museum is to collect, preserve, and communicate the history and heritage of Florida with an emphasis on St. Petersburg and the Pinellas peninsula. The museum hosts a variety of traveling exhibits, evening events, guest speakers, and more. The St. Petersburg Museum of History has a significant archive that includes over 5,000 indexed city photographs, 32,000 artifacts, and other historic photos and documents.

Notable holdings include a plus-sized pair of pajamas owned by William Howard Taft; a full-sized replica of the Benoist XIV aircraft; reading glasses owned by George Armstrong Custer; and the largest collection of signed baseballs in the world (called "Little Cooperstown").

== Research Center ==
Within its premises, the museum includes a research center accessible to academics, historians, and the general populace. This center offers resources, such as documents, photos, maps, and books, focusing on the history of St. Petersburg, the wider Tampa Bay area, and Florida. This resource enables research across a spectrum of topics, from the region's indigenous communities and early European settlers to its evolution into a significant metropolitan area. The research center also supports the museum's exhibits and educational programs by supplying historical data and information.

== Gallery ==
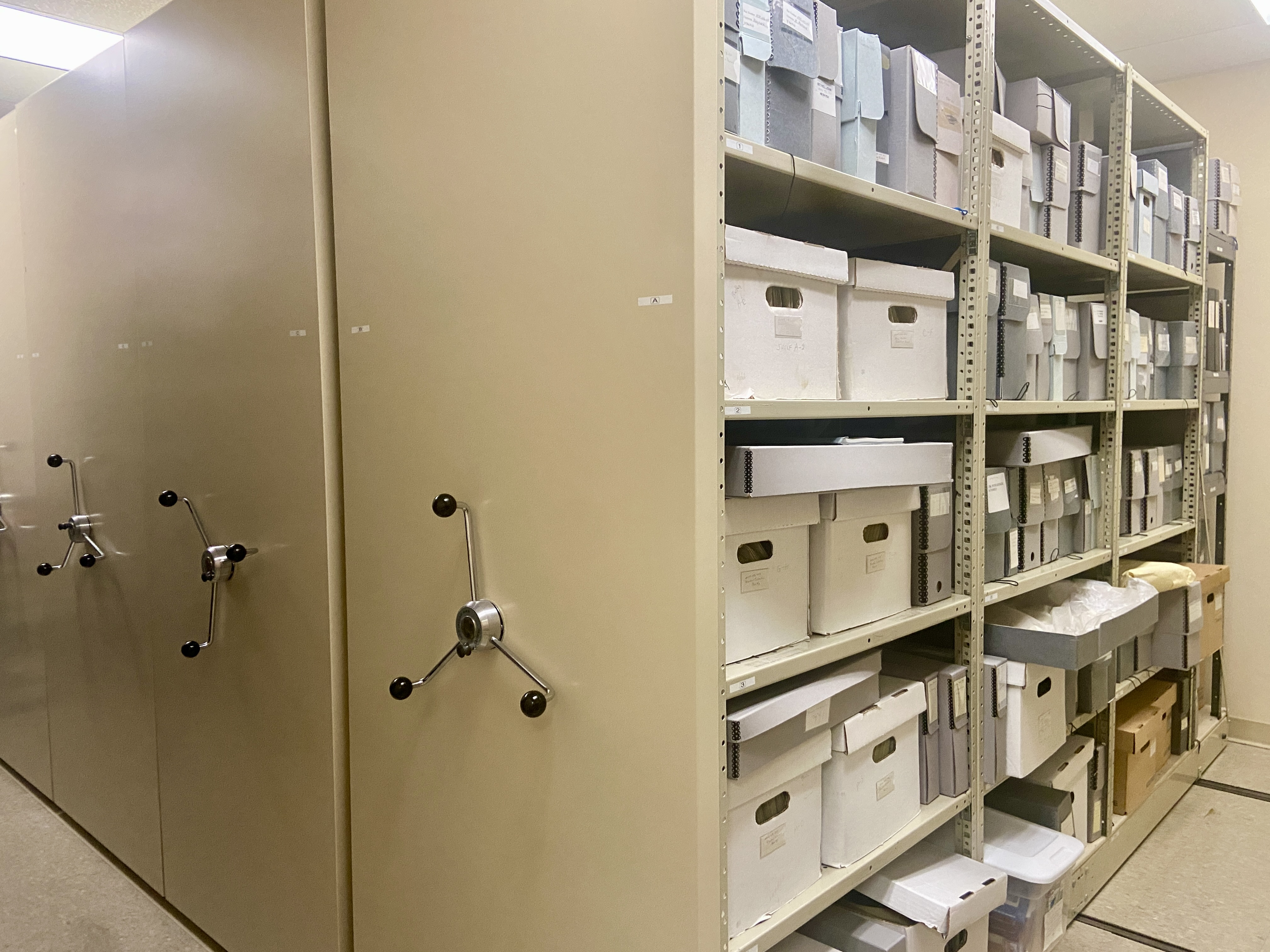
Collections Archive

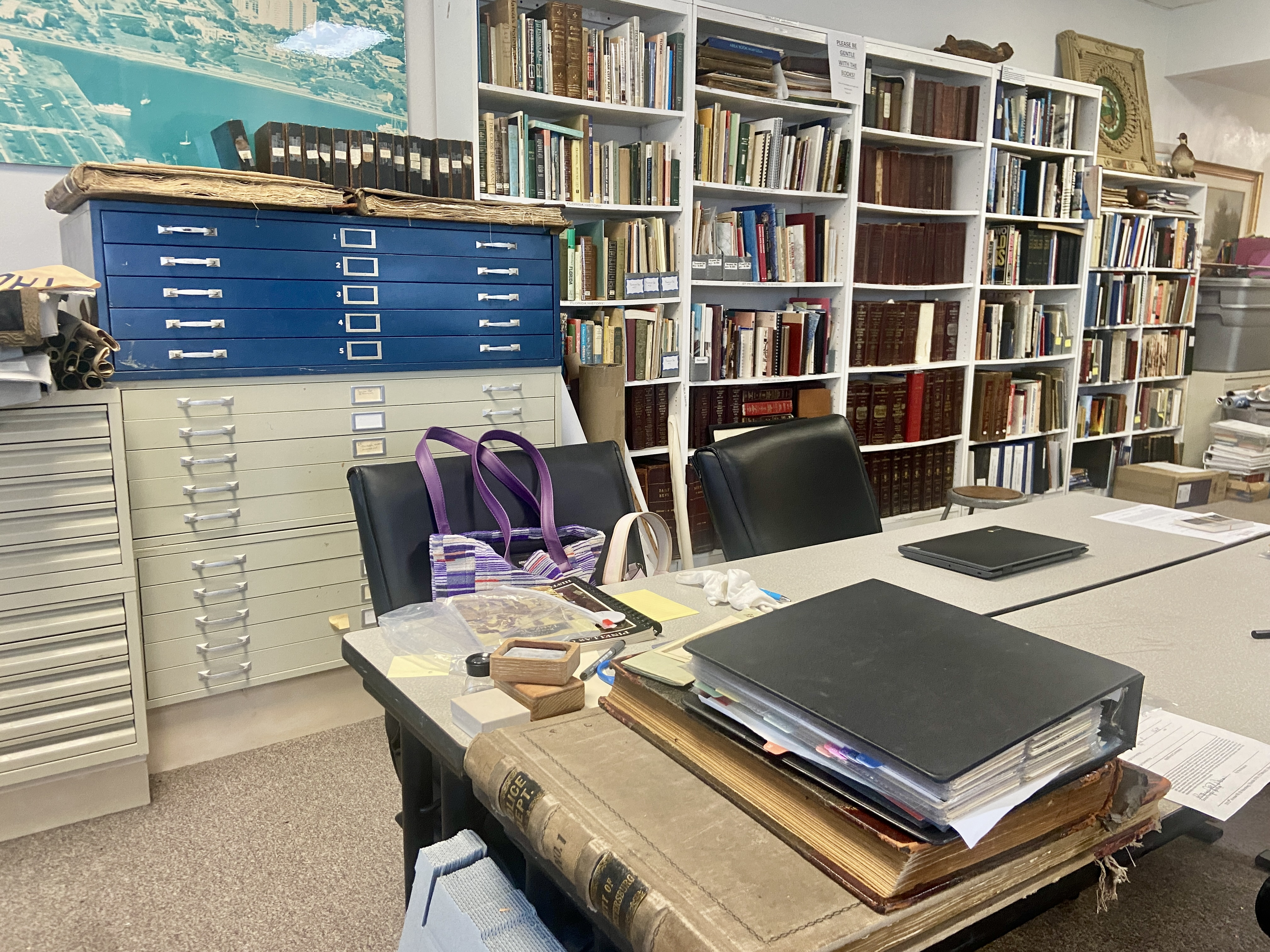
Research Center

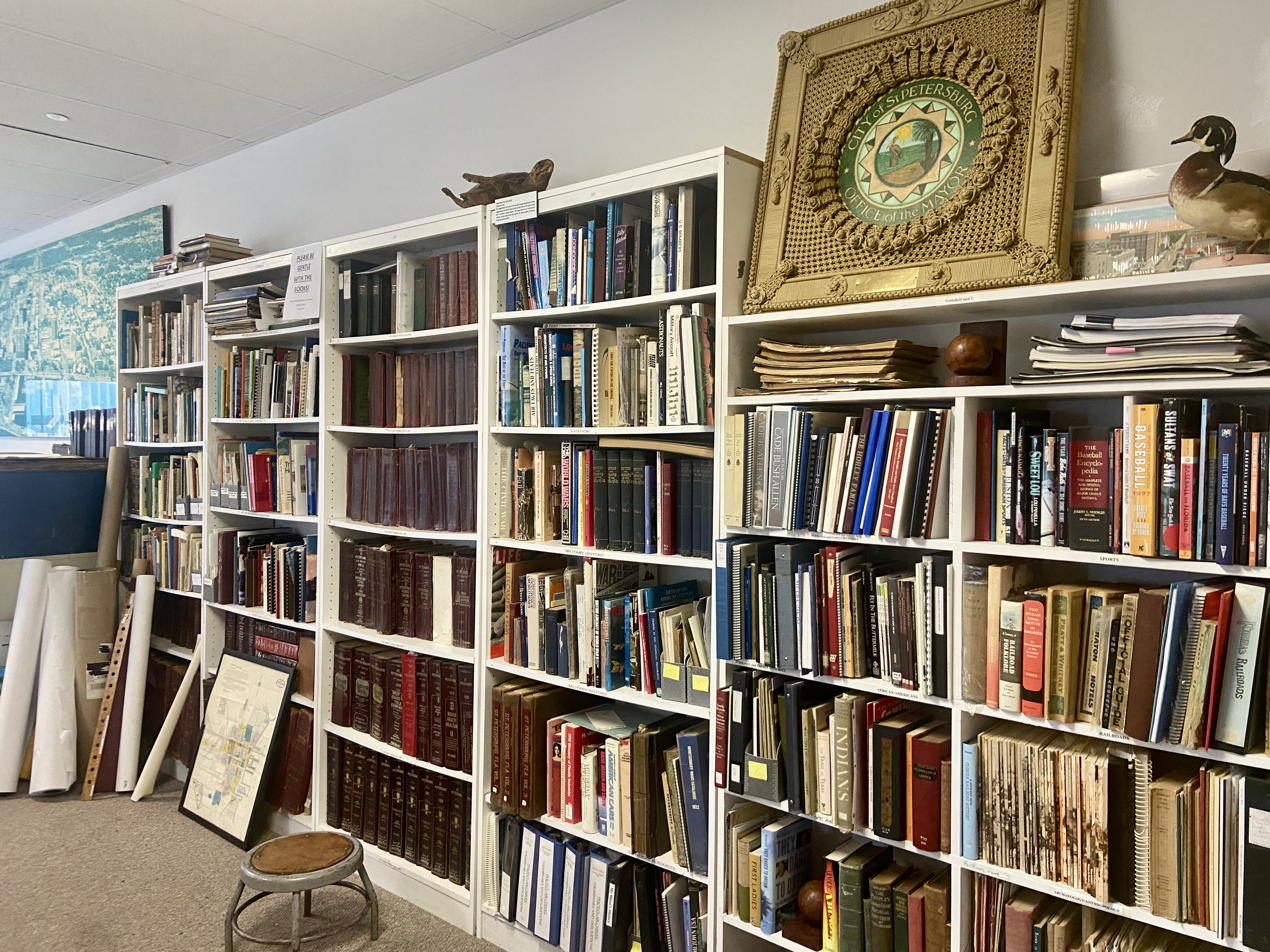
Research library

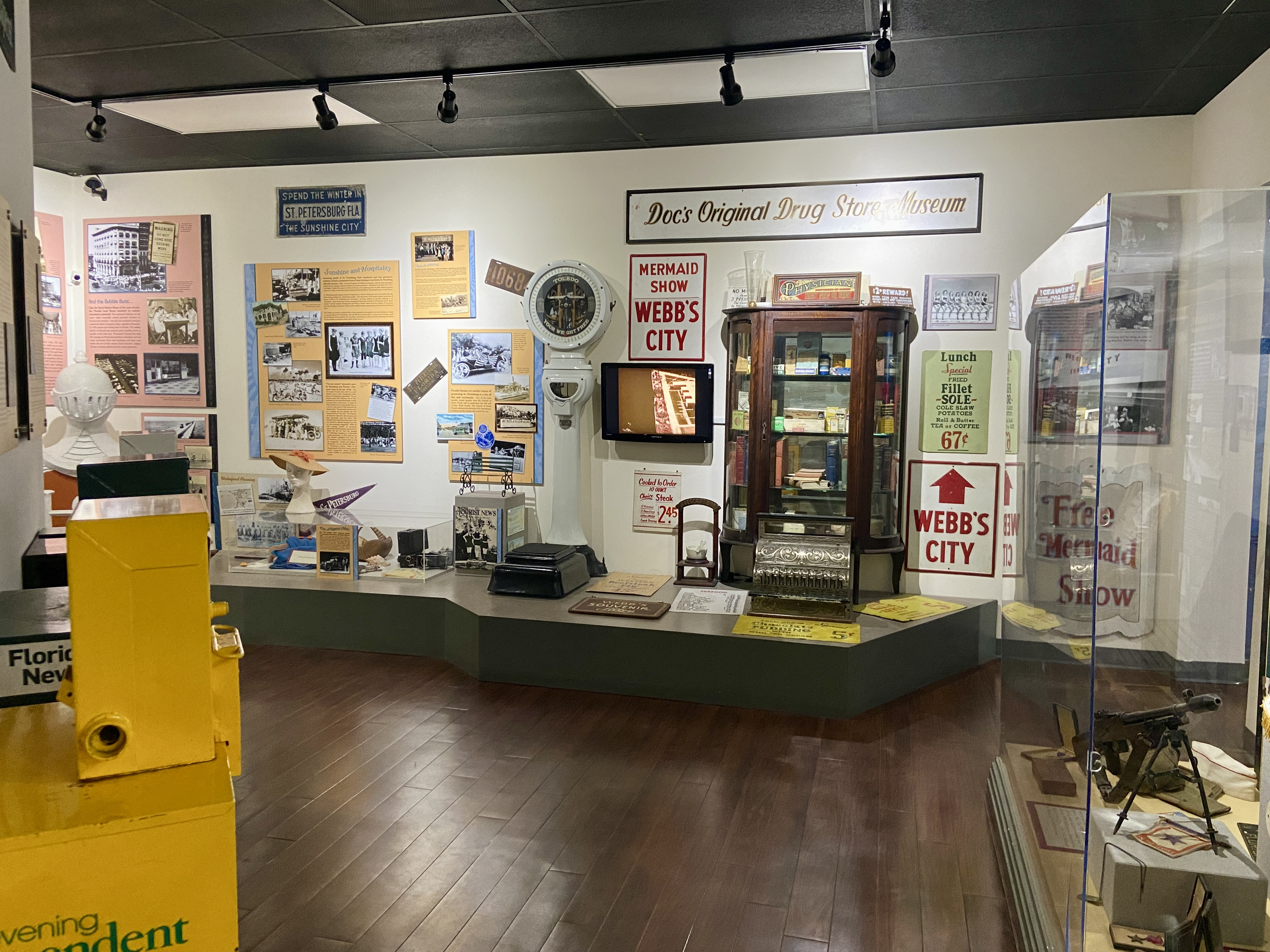
Exhibit on St. Petersburg's local history

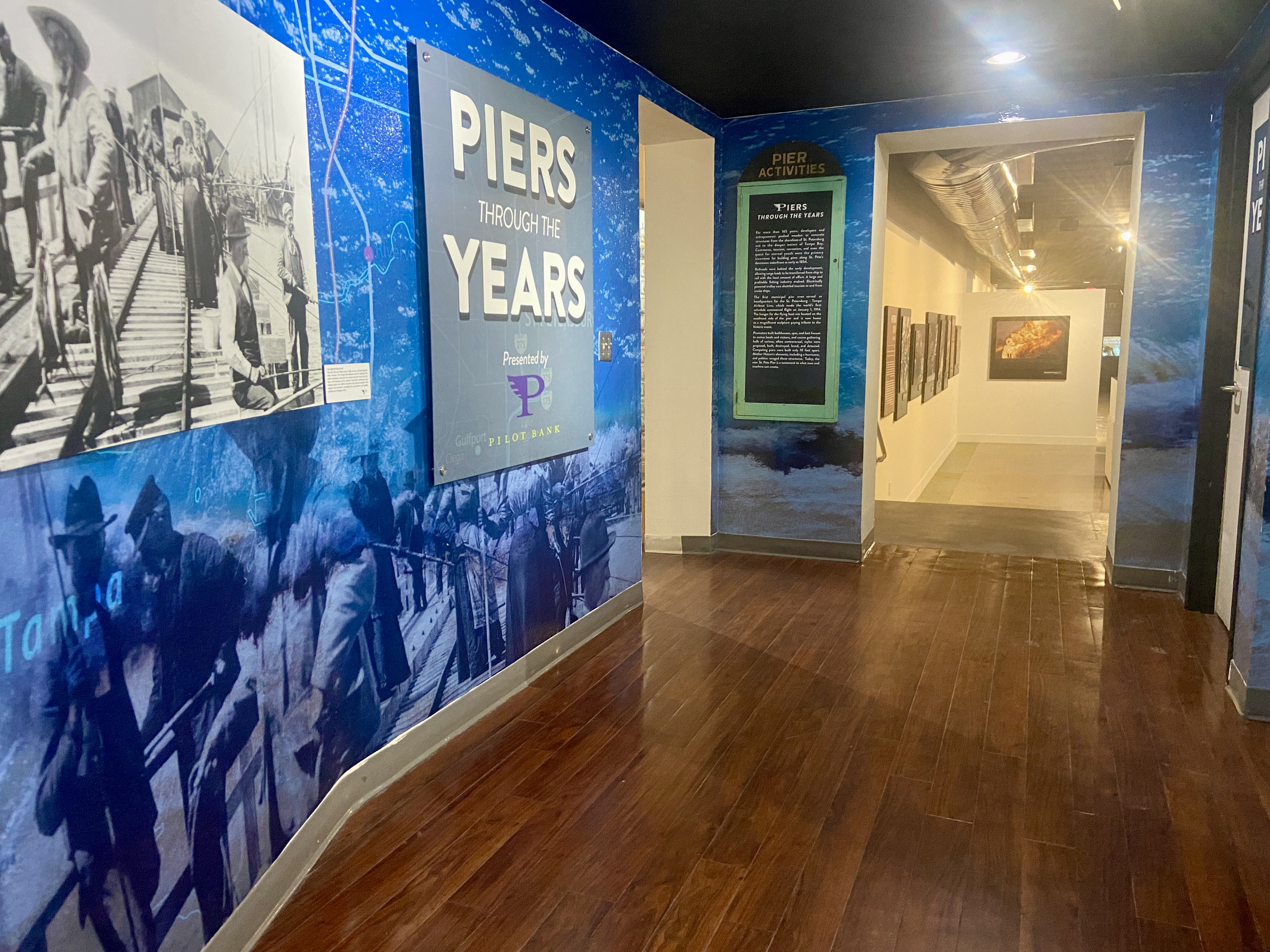
Exhibit: Piers Through the Years

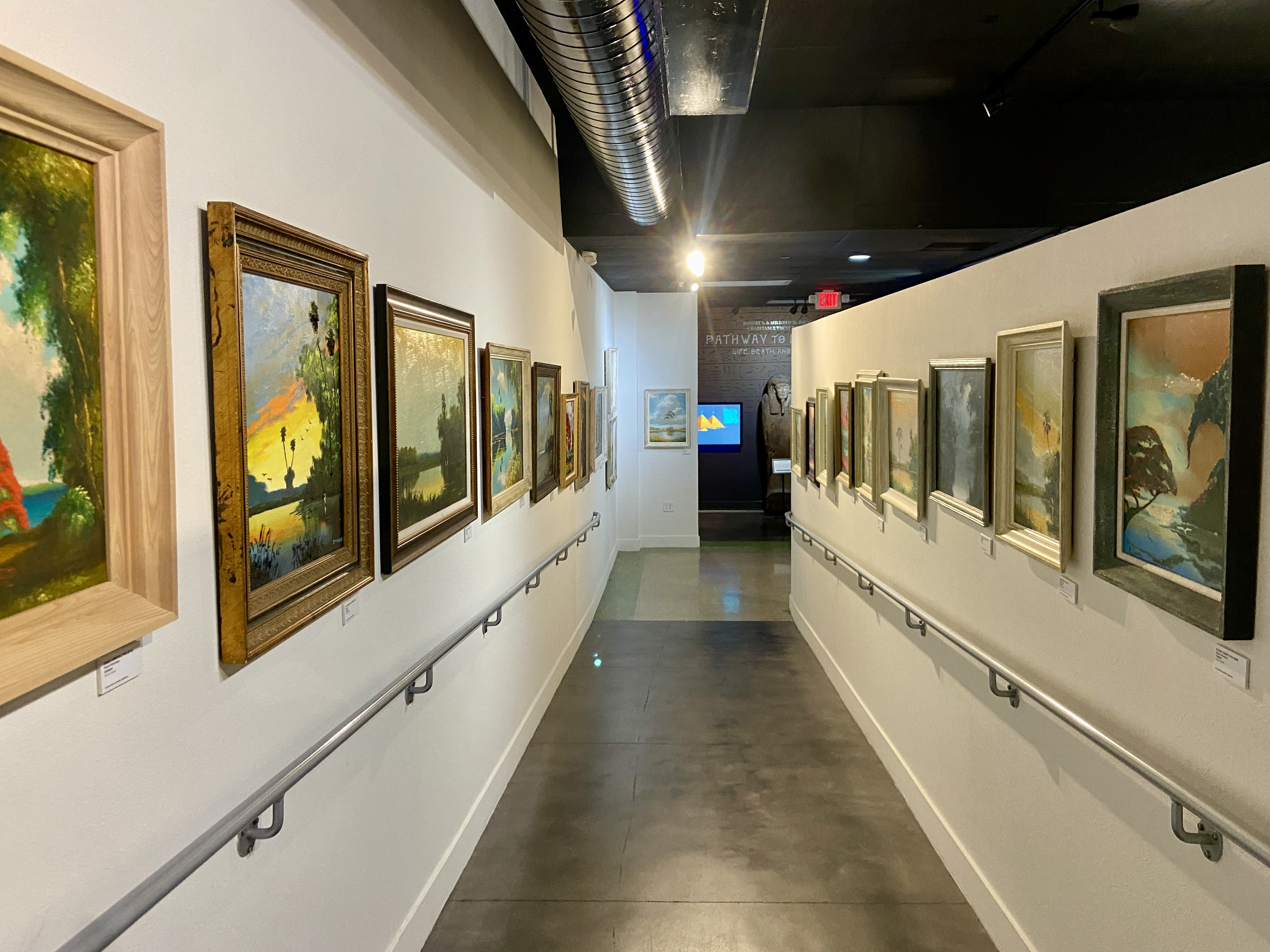
Exhibit on local African American artists

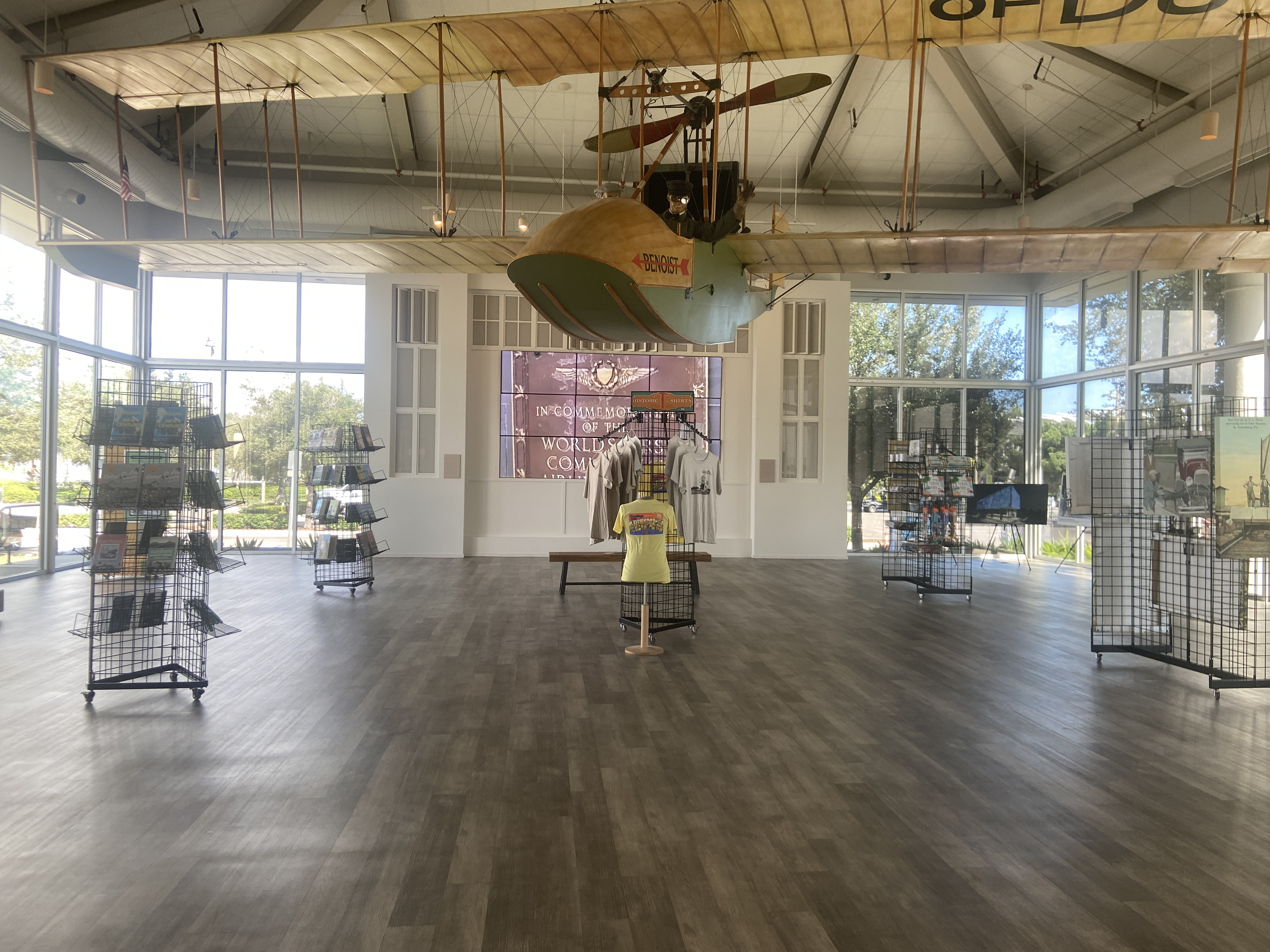
Event/Lecture hall

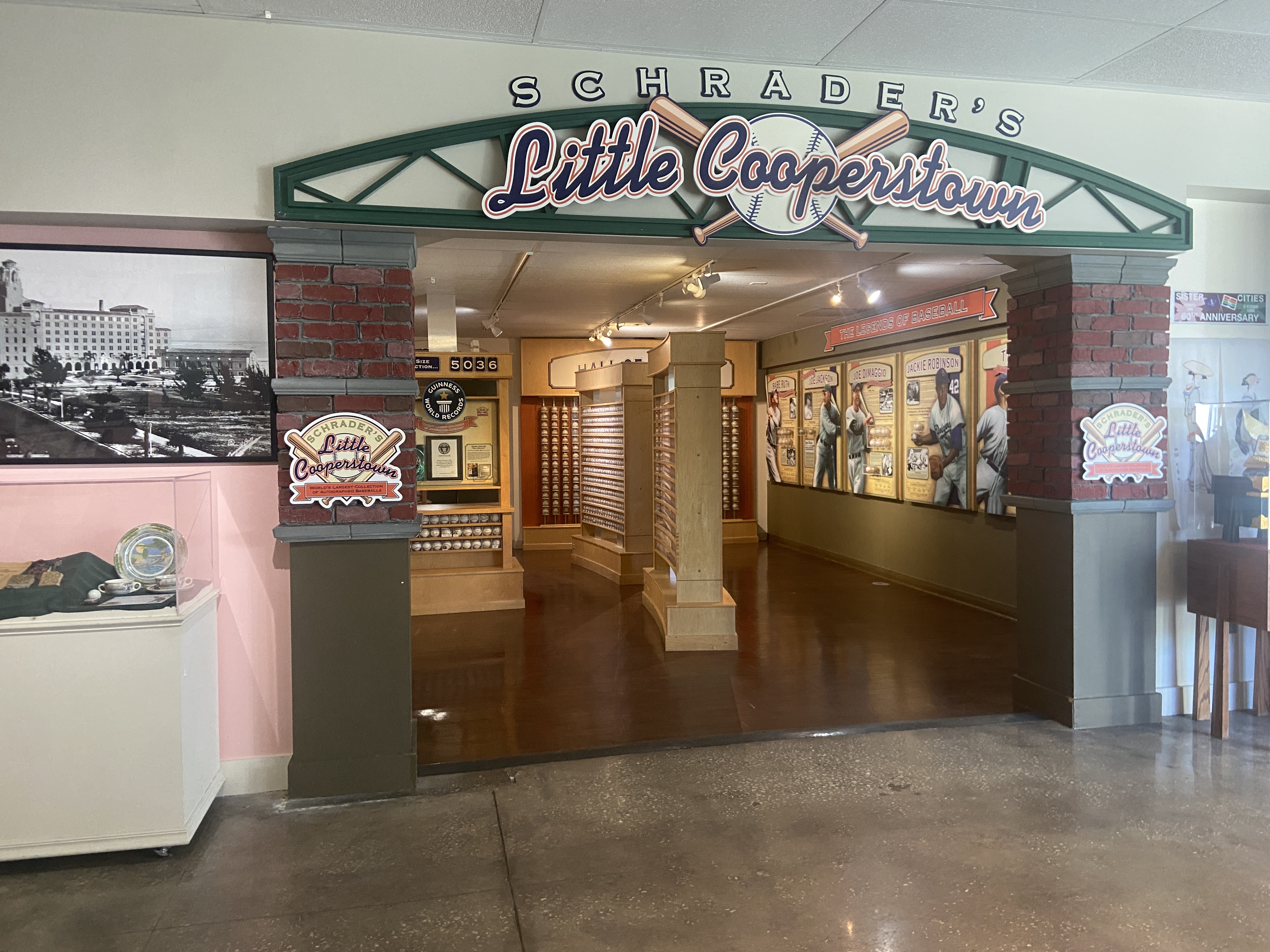
World's largest collection of autographed baseballs
