= Karen A. White =

Karen A. White was the Regional Chancellor of the University of South Florida St. Petersburg from 2003 to 2009. She was appointed to the position in July 2003 by University of South Florida President Judy Genshaft, and stepped down in the end of 2008 and the beginning of 2009. Prior to this appointment, White was the Dean of the College of Fine Arts and the Professor of Music at the University of Nebraska Omaha from 1993 to July 2003. White was also the Executive Assistant to the Chancellor of the University of Maryland System, a consultant to the National Association of State Universities and Land-Grant Colleges on urban and metropolitan university issues, Assistant to the President at Wright State University, and Professor of Music at Southeastern Louisiana University. White is from Joplin, Missouri where she earned a baccalaureate degree in music education from the University of Arkansas and a masters and doctorate of musical arts from the University of Arizona.
