= Rick Baker (mayor) =

American politician (born 1956)

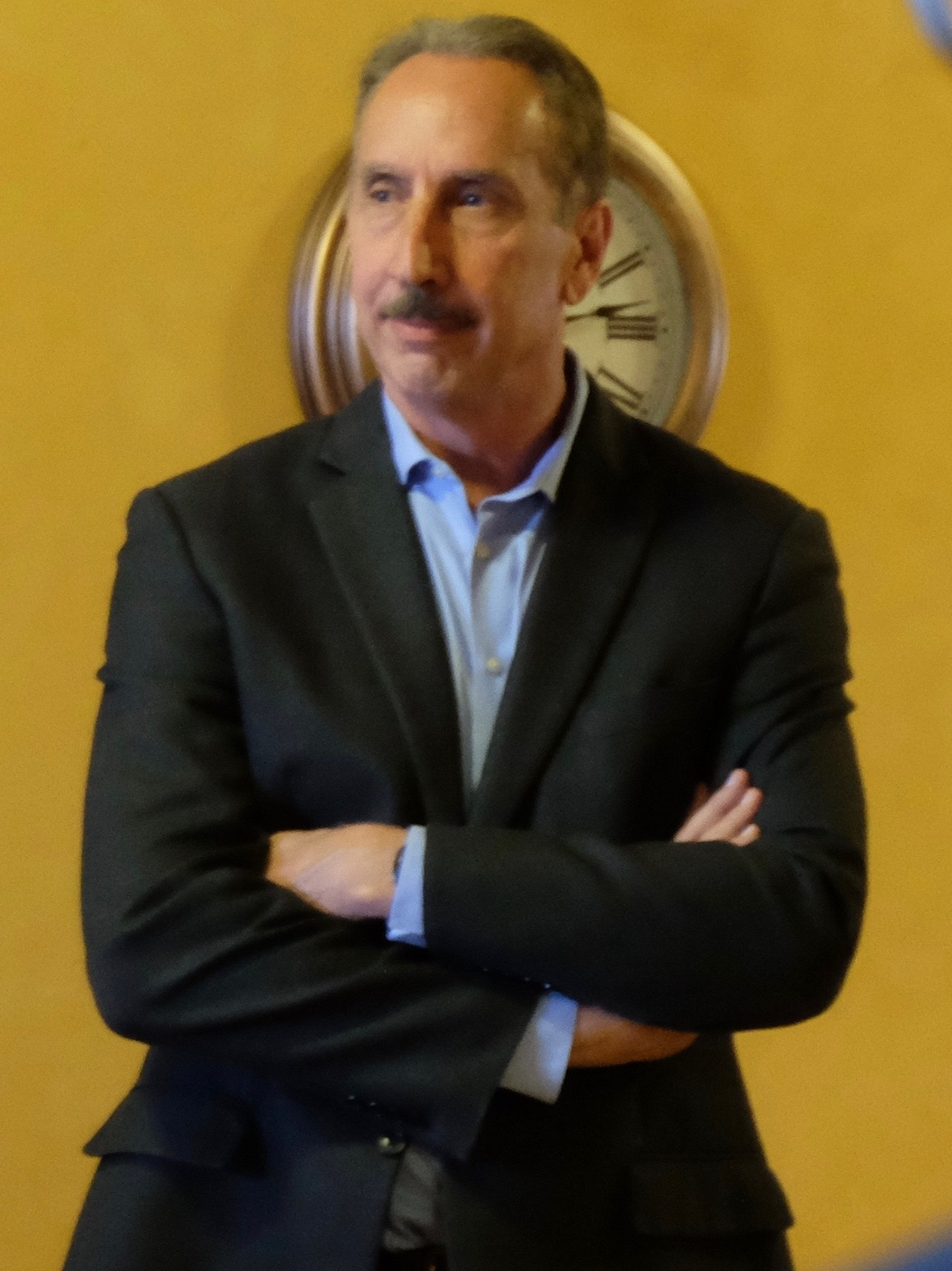

Mayor of St. Petersburg
- In office April 1, 2001 – January 2, 2010
- Preceded by: David J. Fischer
- Succeeded by: Bill Foster

Personal details
- Born: Richard Murray Baker; June 27, 1956 (age 70) Chicago, Illinois, U.S.
- Party: Republican
- Spouse: Joyce Baker
- Children: 2
- Education: Florida State University (BS, MBA, JD)

Richard Murray "Rick" Baker (born June 27, 1956) is an American attorney and politician who served as mayor of St. Petersburg, Florida. Elected in 2001, he was reelected in November 2005 with almost 70% of the vote.

== Early life and education ==
Born in Chicago, Baker is married to wife Joyce. While attending Florida State University, Baker was the President of Lambda Chi Alpha fraternity. He also served as the school's senior class president and president of the Student Senate. Baker has a background in management and law. Baker received a BS in management, an MBA and Juris Doctor (honors) from Florida State University. He also studied comparative law for a term abroad at University of Oxford. Baker has practiced corporate and business law for 20 years, serving as president of Fisher and Sauls, P.A., a St. Petersburg law firm. Prior to his election as mayor, Baker served as the chairman of the St. Petersburg Chamber of Commerce. He is also the author of two books, "Mangroves to Major League," a historical account of the development of the city of St. Petersburg and "The Seamless City," a summation of Baker's time as Mayor where he lays out his vision for smart urban renewal.

== Political career ==
=== Mayor of St. Petersburg ===
==== Youth programs and education ====
Even though public schools are run at the County level, during his time as Mayor, Baker made education a priority. Recognizing that quality education is linked to building a quality community Baker personally involved and motivated corporate leaders and city staff to partner and participate through the "Mayor's Mentors and More" program. Baker raised private donations used to send hundreds of students to college and vocational school and set up corporate partners for each of St. Petersburg's 47 public schools to help provide financial support, equipment, volunteers etc. City employees were encouraged to mentor students by giving employees one hour of paid leave each week to mentor in the schools. At the time, 160 city employees participated in the program.

Baker also developed the "A+ Housing" program, which provides financial assistance in the form of an interest free loan up to $18,000 for a down payment for St. Petersburg teachers who buy a home or condo in the city. The loan is converted into a grant after ten years of service as a teacher in St. Pete schools.

Baker's "Doorways Scholars" program awarded over 600 scholarships to at-risk middle school students. Awards were made to sixth graders eligible for free or reduced lunch who stay in school, maintain a C average through high school graduation, maintain good conduct and attendance and are drug and crime free.

In 2005, 38 percent of the city's schools improved their Florida state ratings based on FCAT test results, compared to 10 percent of Florida public schools and 12 percent within the Pinellas County school system.

Outside the classroom Mayor Baker launched the "Playing Close to Home" mission with a goal of providing a playground within a half mile walk of every child in the city.

After his first 5 years as mayor a group of pastors led a protest march to call for an end to gang violence that had claimed the lives of 85 young African Americans.

==== Economic development and city services ====
During Baker's tenure, St. Petersburg's urban core - the downtown waterfront and Midtown - added several businesses, including a grocery store, a full service post office, and a credit union. Historic gems were also brought back to life. Notably, the Manhattan Casino was renovated, the Royal Theater was turned into a Boys & Girls Club for performing arts and the Seaboard train station became home to one of the largest working potteries in the Southeast United States. A new health clinic opened in the former segregation-era Mercy Hospital.

1,000 new residential units were added to the downtown area, and Progress Energy (now Duke Energy) also moved downtown. The city's Mahaffey Theater was renovated, the waterfront park system was developed and a new building for the Salvador Dalí Museum was finished. Additionally, Baker brought more than 10 elite oceanographic institutions together to form the St. Petersburg Ocean Team and oversaw the development of Beach Dr.

==== Second term ====
Baker's re-election platform, called the "Baker Plan", focused on five areas: education; economic development, particularly in Midtown St. Petersburg; public safety; neighborhood associations; and improving the efficiency of city services. Running against the Democratic Party chair, Baker was re-elected in 2005 to a second term with over 70 percent of the vote, winning every single precinct in the city. He won the Governing Magazine Mayor of the Year award in 2008, an award in which he beat out 20,000 other mayors.

Baker's term expired on January 2, 2010, after which he said he and his family decided against a statewide campaign. "I only have a few years left with my kids at home, and I just want to be with them. It's really not a question of whether I think I could win, it's really personal reasons."

==== Return to public service ====
On May 9, 2017, Baker announced a run for Mayor, what would be his third term, against incumbent Mayor Rick Kriseman. On the steps of City Hall, Baker called for an end to partisan politics and criticized Kriseman's handling of the city's sewage crisis. Baker criticized Kriseman's handling of the city's sewage crisis where the city has dumped about 200 million gallons of wastewater into the bay and St. Petersburg's neighborhoods as well as the recent loss of major South-side businesses such as the only grocery store.

Baker ultimately came second in the 2017 mayoral election.

== Post-political career ==
From 2010 to 2013, he served a vice president for Economic Development at the University of South Florida. From 2013 to 2018 he served as president of the Edwards Group. Since 2018 he has been a development consultant for Coast Autonomous.

== Personal life ==
He and his wife, Joyce, have two children.
