= Lars Hafner =

American politician

Lars Hafner is a college professor, administrator, and former politician in Florida. He served as a Democratic member of the Florida House of Representatives for 12 years and also served as president of the State College of Florida. He is a Democrat.
