= 2001 St. Petersburg, Florida, mayoral election =

2001 St. Petersburg, Florida mayoral election
- February 27, 2001 (first-round); March 27, 2001 (runoff)

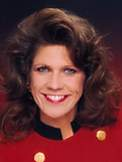

Candidate	Rick Baker	Kathleen Ford
First round	9,306; 25.26%	7,883; 21.40%
Runoff	27,841; 56.55%	21,390; 43.45%
Candidate	Larry J. Williams	Karl Nurse
First round	7,664; 20.80%	5,498; 14.92%
Runoff	Eliminated	Eliminated
Mayor before election
David J. Fischer
Nonpartisan
Elected mayor
Rick Baker
Nonpartisan

The 2001 St. Petersburg, Florida, mayoral election was held on March 27, 2001, following a primary election on February 27, 2001. Incumbent Mayor David J. Fischer declined to run for a fourth term, and a crowded field emerged to succeed him. One of Fischer's campaign advisors, corporate lawyer Rick Baker, placed first in the primary election, winning 25 percent of the vote. City Councilmember Kathleen Ford narrowly beat out City Councilmember Larry J. Williams for second place, and advanced to the general election against Baker. Baker defeated Ford by a wide margin, 57–43 percent, winning his first time as mayor.

== Primary election ==
=== Candidates ===
- Rick Baker, corporate lawyer, former Chairman of the St. Petersburg Area Chamber of Commerce
- Kathleen Ford, City Councilmember
- Larry J. Williams, City Councilmember
- Karl Nurse, Chairman of the St. Petersburg Planning Commission
- Omali Yeshitela, community activist
- Maria Scruggs-Weston, hospital worker
- Ronnie Beck, businessman
- Patrick Bailey, collection agency owner
- Louis "Lou" Miceli, factory worker

=== Results ===
2001 St. Petersburg, Florida, mayoral primary election
Party	Candidate	Votes	%
Nonpartisan	Rick Baker	9,306	25.26%
Nonpartisan	Kathleen Ford	7,883	21.40%
Nonpartisan	Larry J. Williams	7,664	20.80%
Nonpartisan	Karl Nurse	5,498	14.92%
Nonpartisan	Omali Yeshitela	3,905	10.60%
Nonpartisan	Maria Scruggs-Weston	1,372	3.72%
Nonpartisan	Ronnie Beck	789	2.14%
Nonpartisan	Patrick Bailey	292	0.79%
Nonpartisan	Louis "Lou" Miceli	133	0.36%
Total votes		36,842	100.00%

== General election ==
=== Results ===
2001 St. Petersburg, Florida, mayoral general election
Party	Candidate	Votes	%
Nonpartisan	Rick Baker	27,841	56.55%
Nonpartisan	Kathleen Ford	21,390	43.45%
Total votes		49,231	100.00%
