= Florida's 52nd House of Representatives district =

Florida district

Florida's 52nd State House of Representatives district
- Representative: Vacant

Florida's 52nd House of Representatives district elects one member of the Florida House of Representatives. It covers Sumter County and parts of Hernando County.

== Members ==
- John Temple (2022–2025)
