= 2026 Florida Amendment 3 =

Amendment to the Florida Constitution

- November 3, 2026
- Increased Homestead Exemption; Lower Cap On Increases In Non-Homestead Property Assessments
- Outcome: Amendment adopted

Results
Choice	Votes	%
Yes	4,922,977	61.98%
No	3,020,085	38.02%
Valid votes	7,943,062	95.18%
Invalid or blank votes	402,592	4.82%
Total votes	8,345,654	100.00%
- County results Yes: 70–80% 60–70% 50–60% No: 50–60%

A constitutional referendum was held in the U.S. state of Florida on November 3, 2026, regarding an expansion of homestead tax exemptions and a lowered cap on property assessment rises. The amendment passed with 62% of the vote, surpassing the 60% necessary to become part of the Florida Constitution.

== Background ==
On May 27, 2026, Governor of Florida Ron DeSantis called a special legislative session for June 1–3, 2026, to consider a constitutional amendment, named the Save Our Homes from Excessive Property Taxes Amendment. State Representative Toby Overdorf introduced the amendment to the Florida Legislature, which passed the Florida House of Representatives with 75 members voting yes, 26 voting no, and 17 members not voting. The amendment passed the Florida Senate by 30 state senators voting yes, 9 voting no, and one member not voting. The vote to pass the amendment passed mostly on party lines, with Republicans voting for passage and Democrats voting against, with three Democratic state senators voting for the amendment and only one Democratic state representative voting for it.

The amendment would increase the homestead tax exemption from $50,000 to $250,000 by 2028 and decrease the cap on how much the assessed value of non-homestead properties can increase each year from 10% to 5%.

== Campaign ==
Supporters of the amendment said the plan would reduce the tax burden and save money for individuals, whereas local governments said that the reduced tax revenue would lead to service cuts. Bob Henriquez, Hillsborough County property appraiser, said that Hillsborough County could lose up to $300 million, forcing budget cuts. Orange County Sheriff John Mina stated that the reduced property tax would mean cuts to police personnel, and Orange County stated it could lose $275 million from its budget and force budget cuts.

== Results ==
The amendment received 62% support statewide, exceeding the 60% supermajority threshold required to become part of the Constitution of Florida. The amendment received majority support in all but three counties, and received more than 60% support in many of the state's most populous counties, including Osceola County, Miami-Dade, and Lee County.

== Aftermath ==
In the immediate aftermath of the amendment's passage, several Florida local governments began planning immediate budget cuts.

== See also ==
- Elections in Florida
- 2026 Florida elections
- 2020 Florida Amendment 5
- 2022 Florida Amendment 3
- 1978 California Proposition 13
