= List of Florida ballot measures =

The U.S. state of Florida has had a system of direct voting since 1886, as the Florida Constitution of 1885 required voter approval for all constitutional amendments. Since then, the system has undergone several overhauls. In 1968, voters approved an amendment creating an initiative and referendum system.

== Background ==
The Florida Constitution of 1885 carried a section requiring voter approval for all constitutional amendments. This system remained largely unchanged until 1968, when an amendment was passed creating a system by which citizens could place amendments on the ballot using the initiative process. Since then, state officials have regularly attempted to restrict the systems use, including by charging for signature verification, requiring amendments to reach a three-thirds supermajority (60%) voter approval to pass (which was approved by voters as a legislative referred constitutional amendment in 2006 in a ballot measure election), and restricting signature collection. As a result of these restrictions, Florida is one of the few states in which paid signature collectors are commonplace. In 2021, the state legislature passed a bill limiting individual contributions to ballot measure campaigns to $3,000, claiming that such a restriction would reduce fraud. In 2022, a federal judge blocked the bill from going into effect, citing donors First Amendment rights as the core legal reasoning.

Some ballot measures passed in Florida have been the subject of controversy or extended discussion. In 2000, a ballot measure requiring a high-speed rail project be started within 3 years was passed. The measure, which had been the subject of lengthy legal proceedings before making it onto the ballot, was estimated to cost at least $5 billon. After several years of little progress, a second ballot measure repealing the requirement passed with 64% of the vote in 2004. In 2008, Amendment 2 banning same-sex marriages passed with 62% of the vote, along with similar measures in Arizona, Florida, and Arkansas. A study of the vote by the University of Florida later found that lower education levels were a strong predictor of support for the measure. In 2018, Florida voters passed Amendment 4, which extended voting rights to most former felons who had completed their sentences. Despite passing with 65% of the vote, state officials were slow to implement the updated guidelines, preventing many newly eligible voters from voting for several years. In 2022, Amendment 4 was reintroduced to the public eye after Governor Ron DeSantis announced the prosecution of twenty former felons who had been misled into thinking they were eligible to vote under the Amendment.

Several academic studies of Florida ballot measures and their connections to other aspects of the political sphere have been conducted. A study of the language used by ballot measures found that voters were more likely to support ballot measures with a "local" framing than ones with a statewide or national framing. Another study examining petition signing found that Florida residents who signed ballot measure petitions were significantly more likely to vote in the upcoming election regardless of whether the measure they supported made it to the ballot. An analysis of newspaper endorsements found that even if voters in Florida disagreed with a newspaper's political alignment, a newspaper's endorsement of a ballot measure was positively connected to that measure passing or failing.

== Types of ballot measures ==
There are several types of ballot measures in Florida, including a mix of citizen-initiated types and government-initiated types.

- Citizen-initiated constitutional amendments, which are placed on the ballot after receiving signatures equal to at least 8% of voters in the previous election in at least 14 of Florida's congressional districts
- Legislatively-referred constitutional amendments, which are placed on the ballot after being passed by the legislature
- Commission-referred constitutional amendments, which are placed on the ballot by the authority of the Florida Constitution Revision Commission
- Advisory questions, automatic ballot referrals, constitutional convention referrals, and legislatively referred state statues have also appeared on the ballot occasionally

== 1800s ==
=== 1886 ===
Measure name	Description	Status	Yes votes	No votes
Constitution of 1885	A measure to formally adopt the Constitution of Florida	Passed	31,803 (59.95%)	21,243 (40.05%)
Local Option Amendment	A constitutional amendment to allow localities to prohibit alcohol	Passed	29,831 (69.81%)	12,902 (30.19%)

=== 1890 ===
Measure name	Description	Status	Yes votes	No votes
Amendment 1	A constitutional amendment to State Representatives every two years	Passed	--	--
Amendment 2	A constitutional amendment to set the size of the Florida Legislature and establish term limits for state legislators	Passed	--	--
Amendment 3	A constitutional amendment to hold general elections every two years	Passed	--	--

=== 1892 ===
Measure name	Description	Status	Yes votes	No votes
Amendment 1	A constitutional amendment creating a property tax exemption for widows	Failed	--	--

=== 1894 ===
Measure name	Description	Status	Yes votes	No votes
Amendment 1	A constitutional amendment to transfer the responsibility to pay trial costs to the counties where the crime was committed	Passed	9,755 (53.76%)	8,392 (46.24%)
Amendment 2	A constitutional amendment to extend voting rights to men aged 21 years and older, having met certain residency requirements.	Passed	11,691 (67.36%)	5,664 (32.64%)
Amendment 3	A constitutional amendment modifying how the state school fund is distributed	Passed	10,126 (52.52%)	9,154 (47.48%)

=== 1896 ===
Measure name	Description	Status	Yes votes	No votes
Article 16, Section 6	A constitutional amendment requiring the legislature and supreme court to publicize newly enacted laws and decisions	Passed	8,870 (93.00%)	667 (7.00%)
Article 3, Section 17	A constitutional amendment modifying legislature proceedings	Passed	7,786 (91.88%)	688 (8.12%)
Article 4, Section 12	A constitutional amendment providing the Governor, Secretary of State, Comptroller, Attorney General, and Commissioner of Agriculture with the ability to grant pardons	Passed	7,352 (92.62%)	586 (7.38%)
Article 5, Section 22	A constitutional amendment establishing the authority of Justices of the Peace	Passed	8,327 (94.78%)	459 (5.22%)
Changing State Elections to November	A constitutional amendment moving the general election date from October to November	Passed	8,389 (83.60%)	1,646 (16.40%)

=== 1898 ===
Measure name	Description	Status	Yes votes	No votes
Article 16, Section 13	A constitutional amendment modifying the ability of state, county, and municipal governments to issue bonds	Passed	11,582 (90.12%)	1,270 (9.88%)
Article 5, Section 35	A constitutional amendment limiting the establishment of new courts	Passed	12,061 (91.63%)	1,102 (8.37%)
Article 3, Section 34	A constitutional amendment establishing procedures for the impeachment of state officials	Passed	11,145 (93.54%)	770 (6.46%)

== 1900–1949 ==
=== 1900 ===
Measure name	Description	Status	Yes votes	No votes
Article 7, Section 4	A constitutional amendment to ensure representation in the state legislature for new counties	Passed	5,947 (58.70%)	4,184 (41.30%)
Article 3, Section 25	A constitutional amendment prohibiting special incorporation laws	Passed	5,650 (57.84%)	4,118 (42.16%)
Article 8, Section 5	A constitutional amendment modifying the election procedures for county commissioners	Passed	8,243 (70.75%)	3,408 (29.25%)
Article 16, Section 12	A constitutional amendment defining the state seal and state flag	Passed	5,088 (57.12%)	3,819 (42.88%)

=== 1902 ===
Measure name	Description	Status	Yes votes	No votes
Amendment 1	A constitutional amendment to increase the number of justices and modify the procedures of the Florida Supreme Court	Passed	5,515 (63.67%)	3,147 (36.33%)
Amendment 2	A constitutional amendment to create eight state judicial circuits	Passed	5,170 (62.87%)	3,053 (37.13%)

=== 1904 ===
Measure name	Description	Status	Yes votes	No votes
Amendment 1	A constitutional amendment to increase the term length for some county officials	Failed	4,983 (46.25%)	5,791 (53.75%)
Amendment 2	A constitutional amendment to increase the maximum county tax for schools	Passed	5,933 (52.60%)	5,346 (47.70%)
Amendment 3	A constitutional amendment to establish county-level courts	Failed	3,750 (38.37%)	6,023 (61.63%)
Amendment 4	A constitutional amendment allowing tax exemptions for manufacturing businesses	Failed	3,140 (34.13%)	6,059 (65.87%)
Amendment 5	A constitutional amendment preventing Supreme Court decisions from going into effect until after being filed	Failed	3,840 (45.04%)	4,685 (54.96%)
Amendment 6	A constitutional amendment creating a new court at the state level	Failed	2,534 (30.06%)	5,897 (69.94%)
Amendment 7	A constitutional amendment to require all municipalities to use the same system of government	Failed	3,438 (41.95%)	4,758 (58.05%)

=== 1906 ===
Measure name	Description	Status	Yes votes	No votes
Amendment 1	A constitutional amendment to create a board of drainage commissioners	Failed	8,787 (37.30%)	14,771 (62.70%)
Amendment 2	A constitutional amendment to set the salaries of Supreme Court and Circuit Judges at $4,000 and $3,500 a year respectively	Failed	6,752 (38.40%)	10,830 (61.60%)
Amendment 3	A constitutional amendment to set salaries for judges in various Criminal Courts of Record	Failed	6,265 (39.17%)	9,729 (60.83%)
Amendment 4	A constitutional amendment to create a Court of Record for Escambia County	Failed	5,577 (38.77%)	8,806 (61.23%)
Amendment 5	A constitutional amendment to modify the process of amending the Florida Constitution	Failed	5,322 (36.06%)	9,436 (63.94%)

=== 1908 ===
Measure name	Description	Status	Yes votes	No votes
Amendment 1	A constitutional amendment to allow the legislature to set judicial salaries	Failed	6,835 (47.78%)	7,469 (52.22%)
Amendment 2	A constitutional amendment creating a tax to support some higher education facilities in Florida	Failed	6,961 (48.21%)	7,477 (51.79%)
Amendment 3	A constitutional amendment outlining a process for the creation of new judicial circuits	Failed	6,150 (47.31%)	6,850 (52.69%)

=== 1910 ===
Measure name	Description	Status	Yes votes	No votes
Amendment 1	A constitutional amendment to allow the creation of additional judicial circuits	Passed	15,246 (51.34%)	14,453 (48.66%)
Amendment 2	A constitutional amendment to create a Court of Record for Escambia County	Passed	15,041 (52.79%)	13,450 (47.21%)
Amendment 3	A constitutional amendment to prohibit the sale of alcohol	Failed	24,506 (45.57%)	29,271 (54.43%)

=== 1912 ===
Measure name	Description	Status	Yes votes	No votes
Amendment 1	A constitutional amendment to add a Judge to the Circuit Court of Duval County	Passed	18,051 (85.52%)	3,057 (14.48%)
Amendment 2	A constitutional amendment to allow localities to create school tax districts	Passed	16,348 (80.29%)	4,014 (19.71%)

=== 1914 ===
Measure name	Description	Status	Yes votes	No votes
Amendment 1	A constitutional amendment to restructure the position of County Treasurer	Passed	14,164 (67.99%)	6,668 (32.01%)
Amendment 2	A constitutional amendment to restructure the organization of the State Militia	Passed	10,356 (68.34%)	4,798 (31.66%)
Amendment 3	A constitutional amendment to restructure the statewide court system	Passed	8,998 (66.66%)	4,500 (33.34%)

=== 1916 ===
Measure name	Description	Status	Yes votes	No votes
Amendment 1	A constitutional amendment providing a property tax exemption to widows	Passed	20,859 (62.27%)	12,641 (37.73%)
Amendment 2	A constitutional amendment restructuring the allocation of state senators and representatives per county	Failed	10,258 (36.59%)	17,774 (63.41%)
Amendment 3	A constitutional amendment restricting voting rights to male property owners over the age of 21	Failed	10,518 (34.82%)	19,688 (65.18%)

=== 1918 ===
Measure name	Description	Status	Yes votes	No votes
Amendment 1	A constitutional amendment to require counties to collect a school property tax	Passed	21,895 (67.13%)	10,723 (32.87%)
Amendment 2	A constitutional amendment to prohibit the sale of alcohol	Passed	21,851 (61.62%)	13,609 (38.38%)

=== 1920 ===
Measure name	Description	Status	Yes votes	No votes
Amendment 1	A constitutional amendment to allow the legislature to issue bonds for the purpose of infrastructure development	Failed	34,504 (38.76%)	54,510 (61.24%)

=== 1922 ===
Measure name	Description	Status	Yes votes	No votes
Amendment 1	A constitutional amendment to allow the legislature to create school districts and taxes to fund them	Passed	31,952 (76.52%)	9,804 (23.48%)
Amendment 2	A constitutional amendment to allow the state to add additional circuit court judges if necessary	Passed	21,631 (65.84%)	11,222 (34.16%)
Amendment 3	A constitutional amendment to allow state officials salaries to be paid monthly	Passed	26,731 (77.49%)	7,766 (22.51%)
Amendment 4	A constitutional amendment to restructure the organization of the state legislature	Failed	14,369 (42.09%)	19,771 (57.91%)

=== 1924 ===
Measure name	Description	Status	Yes votes	No votes
Amendment 1	A constitutional amendment to prohibit a state income or state inheritance tax	Passed	60,640 (80.83%)	14,386 (19.17%)
Amendment 2	A constitutional amendment to grant the legislature the ability to supersede Duval County's government	Failed	23,342 (41.54%)	32,850 (58.46%)
Amendment 3	A constitutional amendment to allow the legislature to create school districts and taxes to fund them	Passed	38,036 (70.35%)	16,032 (29.65%)
Amendment 4	A constitutional amendment to restructure the organization of the state legislature	Passed	38,139 (73.00%)	14,108 (27.00%)
Amendment 5	A constitutional amendment to restructure taxation by the state	Passed	36,971 (69.42%)	16,289 (30.58%)

=== 1926 ===
Measure name	Description	Status	Yes votes	No votes
Amendment 1	A constitutional amendment to clarify revenue sources for the County School Fund	Passed	26,401 (62.77%)	15,662 (37.23%)
Amendment 2	A constitutional amendment to make the Chief Justice position on the Florida Supreme Court an elected position by other members of the Court	Passed	20,068 (63.33%)	11,621 (36.67%)
Amendment 3	A constitutional amendment to grant some non-citizens the right to own property in Florida	Passed	18,574 (57.61%)	13,668 (42.39%)

=== 1928 ===
Measure name	Description	Status	Yes votes	No votes
Amendment 1	A constitutional amendment restructuring the legislature's power to set laws relating to cities and towns	Failed	36,194 (47.08%)	40,680 (52.62%)
Amendment 2	A constitutional amendment requiring the publications of some changes to state law before they go into effect	Passed	41,629 (56.94%)	31,487 (43.06%)
Amendment 3	A constitutional amendment to grant the legislature more control over the structure of school districts	Failed	31,048 (41.63%)	43,534 (58.37%)
Amendment 4	A constitutional amendment to modify the pay structure for state legislators	Failed	33,579 (45.68%)	39,932 (54.32%)

=== 1930 ===
Measure name	Description	Status	Yes votes	No votes
Amendment 1	A constitutional amendment to require voter approval for bonds issued by local governments	Passed	48,814 (86.74%)	7,461 (13.26%)
Amendment 2	A constitutional amendment to allow the state to enact an inheritance tax	Passed	47,725 (85.06%)	8,380 (14.94%)
Amendment 3	A constitutional amendment to temporarily exempt some manufacturing plants from taxation	Passed	40,723 (73.95%)	14,342 (26.05%)
Amendment 4	A constitutional amendment to restrict the taxes that can be placed on motor vehicles	Passed	53,088 (86.86%)	8,033 (13.14%)

=== 1932 ===
Measure name	Description	Status	Yes votes	No votes
Amendment 1	A constitutional amendment to restructure the form of county government	Failed	52,612 (40.13%)	78,505 (59.87%)
Amendment 2	A constitutional amendment to restructure the composition of the Florida Supreme Court	Failed	38,445 (32.94%)	78,265 (67.06%)

=== 1934 ===
Measure name	Description	Status	Yes votes	No votes
Amendment 1	A constitutional amendment to allow the legislature to create up to fifteen judicial circuits	Passed	101,086 (78.42%)	27,813 (21.58%)
Amendment 2	A constitutional amendment to provide a homestead exemption of up to $5,000 ($120,336 in 2022).	Passed	123,484 (75.15%)	40,842 (24.85%)
Amendment 3	A constitutional amendment to allow localities to overturn alcohol prohibition	Passed	98,851 (69.92%)	42,532 (30.08%)
Amendment 4	A constitutional amendment to require a grand jury in capital crime cases	Passed	72,093 (67.47%)	34,759 (32.53%)
Amendment 5	A constitutional amendment to establish a uniform system for local governments	Passed	71,476 (70.40%)	30,057 (29.60%)
Amendment 6	A constitutional amendment to provide tax exemptions to movie productions	Passed	70,642 (62.12%)	43,068 (37.88%)
Amendment 7	A constitutional amendment to allow the legislature to create a municipal corporation called the City of Jacksonville	Passed	63,976 (65.52%)	33,674 (34.48%)

=== 1936 ===
Measure name	Description	Status	Yes votes	No votes
City of Key West Amendment	A constitutional amendment to allow the legislature to create a municipal corporation called the City of Key West	Passed	114,460 (84.36%)	21,228 (15.64%)
State Social Security Act Amendment	A constitutional amendment to establish a statewide Social Security System	Passed	197,927 (92.03%)	17,149 (7.97%)

=== 1938 ===
Measure name	Description	Status	Yes votes	No votes
Amendment 1	A constitutional amendment to create a tax exemption for real property	Passed		
Amendment 2	A constitutional amendment to require state laws relating to localities be uniform	Passed		
Amendment 3	A constitutional amendment to allow the legislature to raise funds for a state school system	Passed		
Amendment 4	A constitutional amendment to create the Florida National Guard	Passed		

=== 1940 ===
Measure name	Description	Status	Yes votes	No votes
Amendment 1	A constitutional amendment to prohibit some forms of property tax	Passed		
Amendment 2	A constitutional amendment to create a Parole Commission	Passed		
Amendment 3	A constitutional amendment to allow gambling taxes be distributed equally across the country	Passed		
Amendment 4	A constitutional amendment creating a seventh supreme court justice	Passed		
Amendment 5	A constitutional amendment modifying the county commissioners system	Failed		
Amendment 6	A constitutional amendment creating a widow's tax exemption	Passed		

=== 1942 ===
Measure name	Description	Status	Yes votes	No votes
Amendment 1	A constitutional amendment to create a Florida State Board of Administration	Passed	80,208 (84.85%)	14,322 (15.15%)
Amendment 2	A constitutional amendment allowing the state legislature to place constitutional amendments on the ballot	Passed	47,490 (63.59%)	27,189 (36.41%)
Amendment 3	A constitutional amendment creating the Florida Game and Fresh Water Fish Commission	Passed	49,492 (61.53%)	30,948 (38.47%)
Amendment 4	A constitutional amendment making circuit judges an elected position	Passed	50,046 (66.79%)	24,879 (33.21%)
Amendment 5	A constitutional amendment creating a commission to oversee salt water fish	Passed	49,083 (61.48%)	30,754 (38.52%)
Amendment 6	A constitutional amendment modifying the Senate district system	Failed	25,509 (39.10%)	39,727 (60.90%)
Amendment 7	A constitutional amendment restructuring the Dale County Commissioners Districts	Passed	37,579 (54.24%)	31,707 (45.76%)
Amendment 8	A constitutional amendment restricting how much of a person's income can be seized to pay for debt	Failed	25,713 (35.29%)	47,152 (64.71%)
Amendment 9	A constitutional amendment creating some property tax exemptions for corporations	Failed	19,176 (24.60%)	58,773 (75.40%)

=== 1944 ===
Measure name	Description	Status	Yes votes	No votes
Amendment 1	A constitutional amendment to create special tax rates for some forms of property	Passed	95,632 (66.63%)	47,904 (33.37%)
Amendment 2	A constitutional amendment modifying the Senatorial district system	Failed	63,304 (47.51%)	69,953 (52.49%)
Amendment 3	A constitutional amendment modifying the Justices of the Peace system	Passed	94,312 (66.62%)	47,248 (33.38%)
Amendment 4	A constitutional amendment making state attorneys, judges, and county solicitors elected positions	Passed	91,276 (65.28%)	48,549 (34.72%)
Amendment 5	A constitutional amendment establishing right to work laws	Passed	147,860 (54.64%)	122,770 (45.36%)
Amendment 6	A constitutional amendment modifying the county and town classification system	Failed	69,364 (49.00%)	72,186 (51.00%)
Amendment 7	A constitutional amendment establishing term limits for some elected positions	Passed	89,760 (66.99%)	44,230 (33.01%)
Amendment 8	A constitutional amendment providing that each county have five county commissioners	Passed	84,548 (56.54%)	64,986 (43.46%)
Amendment 10	A constitutional amendment modifying the tax assessment system in Hillsborough County	Passed	72,376 (59.28%)	49,707 (40.72%)

=== 1946 ===
Measure name	Description	Status	Yes votes	No votes
Amendment 1	A constitutional amendment modifying county offices and taxation in Orange County	Passed		
Amendment 2	A constitutional amendment modifying the tax assessment system in Hillsborough County	Failed		
Amendment 3	A constitutional amendment modifying the tax assessment system in Bay County	Failed		
Amendment 4	A constitutional amendment creating the position of director of the budget	Failed		
Amendment 5	A constitutional amendment modifying legislative appropriations	Failed		
Amendment 6	A constitutional amendment modifying the judge election system in Escambia County	Failed		

=== 1948 ===
Measure name	Description	Status	Yes votes	No votes
Amendment 1	A constitutional amendment requiring that all taxes on gasoline be used for road projects	Failed	73,184 (25.73%)	211,248 (74.27%)
Amendment 2	A constitutional amendment allowing the legislature to issue bonds for the purpose of funding education	Failed	59,210 (24.61%)	181,427 (75.39%)
Amendment 3	A constitutional amendment creating two new senatorial districts	Failed	65,729 (34.72%)	123,595 (65.28%)
Amendment 4	A constitutional amendment modifying the pay structure for members of the legislature	Passed	109,778 (57.43%)	81,373 (42.57%)
Amendment 5	A constitutional amendment modifying the system for proposing constitutional amendments	Passed	87,364 (51.96%)	80,776 (48.04%)
Amendment 6	A constitutional amendment allowing retired judges to temporarily return for assignments	Passed	102,896 (59.31%)	70,595 (40.69%)
Amendment 7	A constitutional amendment modifying the tax assessment system in Saint Lucie County	Passed	87,539 (57.53%)	64,617 (42.47%)
Amendment 8	A constitutional amendment modifying the tax assessment system in Broward County	Passed	86,519 (57.67%)	63,506 (42.33%)
Amendment 9	A constitutional amendment modifying the tax assessment system in Volusia County	Passed	84,482 (57.57%)	62,257 (42.43%)
Amendment 10	A constitutional amendment modifying the tax assessment system in Pinellas County	Passed	85,302 (58.54%)	60,405 (41.46%)
Amendment 11	A constitutional amendment modifying the election system in Escambia County	Passed	79,036 (52.93%)	70,299 (47.07%)

== 1950–1999 ==
=== 1950 ===
Measure name	Description	Status	Yes votes	No votes
Amendment 1	A constitutional amendment establishing a juvenile court system	Passed	116,313 (79.20%)	30,540 (20.80%)
Amendment 2	A constitutional amendment replacing the state census with the federal census	Passed	96,145 (65.86%)	49,848 (34.14%)
Amendment 3	A constitutional amendment requiring laws be single subject	Passed	105,053 (78.49%)	28,793 (21.51%)
Amendment 4	A constitutional amendment creating a new judicial circuit for Monroe County	Passed	65,531 (52.96%)	58,216 (47.04%)
Amendment 5	A constitutional amendment allowing large counties to have additional judges	Passed	91,029 (67.88%)	43,081 (32.12%)

=== 1952 ===
Measure name	Description	Status	Yes votes	No votes
Amendment 1	A constitutional amendment diverting money from motor vehicle license fees to education funding	Passed	355,734 (63.54%)	204,163 (36.46%)
Amendment 2	A constitutional amendment modifying various rules relating to the judiciary	Failed	103,531 (26.08%)	293,474 (73.92%)
Amendment 3	A constitutional amendment allowing for county home rule	Failed	175,117 (42.94%)	232,741 (57.06%)
Amendment 4	A constitutional amendment providing an additional judge to the second judicial circuit	Failed	39,655 (38.29%)	225,095 (61.71%)
Amendment 5	A constitutional amendment creating a new senatorial district for Bay and Washington counties	Failed	103,762 (29.98%)	242,323 (70.02%)
Amendment 6	A constitutional amendment creating a new senatorial district for Monroe County	Failed	106,832 (31.48%)	232,504 (68.52%)
Amendment 7	A constitutional amendment modifying the tax assessment system in Monroe County	Failed	135,546 (40.90%)	195,866 (59.10%)
Amendment 8	A constitutional amendment modifying the balance of power in Dade County	Failed	157,411 (45.31%)	189,966 (54.69%)
Amendment 9	A constitutional amendment modifying the tax assessment system in Lee County	Failed	134,702 (41.91%)	186,743 (58.09%)
Amendment 10	A constitutional amendment modifying the court system in Escambia County	Failed	134,628 (40.86%)	194,841 (59.14%)
Amendment 11	A constitutional amendment modifying the treasury system of Escambia County	Failed	151,455 (45.77%)	179,470 (54.23%)

=== 1954 ===
Measure name	Description	Status	Yes votes	No votes
Amendment 1	A constitutional amendment providing for additional legislative sessions if requested by the legislature	Passed	83,868 (56.43%)	64,739 (43.56%)
Amendment 2	A constitutional amendment prohibiting the use of state funds for toll roads over a certain length	Failed	64,042 (43.20%)	84,198 (56.80%)
Amendment 3	A constitutional amendment allowing counties over a certain population to have an additional judge	Passed	88,283 (61.52%)	55,209 (38.48%)
Amendment 4	A constitutional amendment extending the governor's veto period	Passed	105,251 (68.14%)	49,212 (31.86%)
Amendment 5	A constitutional amendment allowing county tax assessors to also assess municipal taxes	Passed	85,677 (59.01%)	59,523 (40.99%)
Amendment 6	A constitutional amendment modifying the tax assessment system in Monroe County	Passed	74,780 (57.97%)	54,210 (42.03%)
Amendment 7	A constitutional amendment providing an additional judge for Escambia County	Passed	81,926 (61.41%)	51,491 (38.59%)

=== 1956 ===
Measure name	Description	Status	Yes votes	No votes
Amendment 1	A constitutional amendment generally modifying the state court system	Passed	372,838 (79.52%)	96,037 (20.48%)
Amendment 2	A constitutional amendment allowing for home rule in Dade County	Passed	322,839 (69.99%)	138,430 (30.01%)
Amendment 4	A constitutional amendment providing for additional legislative sessions if requested by the legislature	Passed	292,772 (68.77%)	132,945 (31.23%)
Amendment 5	A constitutional amendment reapportioning seats in the state legislature	Failed	187,662 (39.41%)	288,575 (60.59%)
Amendment 6	A constitutional amendment providing additional judges for Duval County	Passed	298,185 (73.53%)	107,348 (26.47%)
Amendment 7	A constitutional amendment removing the state Office of County Special Tax School District Trustees	Passed	311,746 (72.63%)	117,488 (27.37%)
Amendment 8	A constitutional amendment allowing County Superintendents to be appointed in some counties	Passed	282,295 (69.67%)	122,897 (30.33%)
Amendment 9	A constitutional amendment transferring some powers in Dade County	Passed	270,344 (72.41%)	102,999 (27.59%)
Amendment 10	A constitutional amendment requiring money collected by Escambia County officers be paid into the general fund	Passed	289,190 (75.81%)	92,270 (24.19%)
Amendment 11	A constitutional amendment providing for the creation of a Florida Civil Service System	Passed	325,502 (75.37%)	106,377 (24.63%)
Amendment 12	A constitutional amendment providing for civil jury trials in Pinellas County	Passed	286,668 (75.70%)	91,998 (24.30%)

=== 1958 ===
Measure name	Description	Status	Yes votes	No votes
Amendment 1	A constitutional amendment allowing the legislature to link proposed constitutional amendments so that all must pass for any to go into effect	Failed	78,923 (27.62%)	206,830 (72.38%)
Amendment 2	A constitutional amendment transferring some powers in Hillsborough County	Passed	147,438 (58.00%)	106,761 (42.00%)

=== 1959 ===
Measure name	Description	Status	Yes votes	No votes
Amendment 1	A constitutional amendment increasing the size of the state legislature	No	146,601 (45.17%)	177,955 (54.83%)

=== 1960 ===
Measure name	Description	Status	Yes votes	No votes
Amendment 1	A constitutional amendment restructuring the district court system	Passed	519,648 (79.24%)	136,106 (20.76%)
Amendment 2	A constitutional amendment providing for absentee registration for members of the armed forces and their families	Passed	572,520 (84.27%)	106,866 (15.73%)
Amendment 3	A constitutional amendment making changes to the Florida Game and Fresh Water Fish Commission	Failed	229,474 (33.98%)	445,945 (66.02%)
Amendment 4	A constitutional amendment modifying the state's tax collection ability	Failed	296,561 (45.07%)	361,389 (54.93%)
Amendment 5	A constitutional amendment providing for civil jury trials in some localities	Passed	425,053 (73.57%)	152,702 (26.43%)
Amendment 6	A constitutional amendment providing for civil jury trials in Brevard County	Passed	446,166 (76.48%)	137,198 (23.52%)

=== 1962 ===
Measure name	Description	Status	Yes votes	No votes
Amendment 1	A constitutional amendment reapportioning the Florida State Legislature	Failed	306,442 (45.08%)	373,259 (54.92%)
Amendment 2	A constitutional amendment allowing school superintendents be an appointed position	Passed	341,434 (62.20%)	207,534 (37.80%)
Amendment 3	A constitutional amendment modifying the legislature's impeachment power	Passed	310,267 (56.95%)	234,505 (43.05%)
Amendment 4	A constitutional amendment providing for civil jury trials in Pasco County	Passed	312,754 (68.21%)	145,788 (31.79%)
Amendment 5	A constitutional amendment transferring some powers in Duval County	Passed	292,747 (66.27%)	149,012 (33.73%)
Amendment 6	A constitutional amendment increasing the number of judges	Failed	226,200 (43.17%)	297,757 (56.83%)
Amendment 7	A constitutional amendment revising the preamble to the constitution	Passed	353,454 (71.33%)	142,084 (28.67%)
Amendment 8	A constitutional amendment modifying Florida's coastal boundaries	Passed	354,983 (74.11%)	124,030 (25.89%)
Amendment 9	A constitutional amendment generally modifying wording	Passed	340,288 (71.67%)	134,517 (28.33%)

=== 1963 ===
Measure name	Description	Status	Yes votes	No votes
Amendment 1	A constitutional amendment modifying election timelines for statewide positions	Passed	254,619 (53.06%)	225,255 (46.94%)
Amendment 2	A constitutional amendment allowing the state to issue bonds for the purpose of supporting higher education	Passed	313,859 (65.28%)	166,959 (34.72%)
Amendment 3	A constitutional amendment allowing the state to issue bonds for the purpose of supporting outdoor recreation and conservation	Passed	263,195 (56.01%)	206,699 (43.99%)

=== 1964 ===
Measure name	Description	Status	Yes votes	No votes
Amendment 1	A constitutional amendment reapportioning the state legislature	Failed	345,637 (34.93%)	643,832 (65.07%)
Amendment 2	A constitutional amendment making College Board positions term-limited	Passed	507,225 (57.53%)	374,380 (42.47%)
Amendment 3	A constitutional amendment modifying where funds from motor vehicle licensing are directed	Passed	509,207 (57.72%)	372,936 (42.28%)
Amendment 4	A constitutional amendment modifying school funding	Failed	363,008 (39.88%)	547,231 (60.12%)
Amendment 5	A constitutional amendment allowing school superintendents to be appointed in some areas	Passed	507,445 (61.09%)	323,203 (38.91%)
Amendment 6	A constitutional amendment allowing the school superintendent of Taylor County be appointed	Passed	494,480 (61.95%)	303,659 (38.05%)
Amendment 7	A constitutional amendment creating a crisis plan in case of emergency to ensure government continuity	Passed	602,980 (71.83%)	236,423 (28.17%)
Amendment 8	A constitutional amendment transferring control over public lands and immigration outside the purview of the Commissioner of Agriculture	Passed	526,075 (65.87%)	272,580 (34.13%)
Amendment 9	A constitutional amendment allowing civil trials in Dade County	Passed	528,235 (67.66%)	252,462 (32.34%)
Amendment 10	A constitutional amendment increasing the number of judicial circuits	Passed	499,658 (62.36%)	301,562 (37.64%)
Amendment 11	A constitutional amendment providing additional avenues for amending the constitution	Passed	420,006 (51.00%)	403,565 (49.00%)
Amendment 12	A constitutional amendment extending funding for the State Road Distribution Trust Fund	Failed	246,443 (26.98%)	667,114 (73.02%)
Amendment 13	A constitutional amendment modifying the homestead exemption in Sarasota County	Passed	458,981 (54.72%)	379,772 (45.28%)

=== 1965 ===
Measure name	Description	Status	Yes votes	No votes
Amendment 1	A constitutional amendment modifying the statewide court system	Passed	394,039 (69.54%)	172,633 (30.46%)
Amendment 2	A constitutional amendment allowing for an additional judge in Lake County	Passed	357,866 (67.61%)	171,458 (32.39%)
Amendment 3	A constitutional amendment modifying the power of Palm Beach County's clerks	Passed	364,754 (70.98%)	149,144 (29.02%)
Amendment 4	A constitutional amendment authorizing bonds for the purpose of road construction	Failed	275,016 (39.32%)	424,434 (60.68%)
Amendment 5	A constitutional amendment defining motor homes as "motor vehicles"	Passed	339,427 (51.52%)	319,436 (48.48%)

=== 1966 ===
Measure name	Description	Status	Yes votes	No votes
Amendment 1	A constitutional amendment modifying the process of amending the constitution	Passed	626,806 (82.87%)	129,545 (17.13%)
Amendment 2	A constitutional amendment clarifying the terms of employment for county superintendents	Passed	499,991 (67.84%)	237,069 (32.16%)
Amendment 3	A constitutional amendment extending voting rights to more people	Passed	515,212 (69.04%)	231,088 (30.96%)
Amendment 4	A constitutional amendment requiring the state flag conform with standard sizing	Passed	549,678 (79.72%)	139,792 (20.28%)
Amendment 5	A constitutional amendment transferring power over county government from the state to the people	Passed	451,458 (72.01%)	175,464 (27.99%)
Amendment 6	A constitutional amendment authorizing the legislature to require county judges be members of the Florida Bar Association	Passed	506,088 (73.27%)	184,646 (26.73%)
Amendment 7	A constitutional amendment allowing the legislature to determine the number of county judges	Passed	452,974 (68.98%)	203,708 (31.02%)
Amendment 8	A constitutional amendment creating the Judicial Qualifications Commission	Passed	533,513 (78.88%)	142,863 (21.12%)
Amendment 9	A constitutional amendment modifying the structure of the court system	Passed	431,291 (70.56%)	179,952 (29.44%)
Amendment 10	A constitutional amendment authorizing the Orange County commissioners to modify the district boundaries for their justices of the peace	Passed	435,162 (72.25%)	167,149 (27.25%)
Amendment 11	A constitutional amendment mandating that property juries be composed of twelve jurors	Passed	527,821 (80.44%)	128,345 (19.56%)
Amendment 12	A constitutional amendment providing for a special legislative session if necessary	Passed	496,919 (76.94%)	148,939 (23.06%)
Amendment 13	A constitutional amendment exempting inventory and livestock from some taxes	Passed	481,420 (66.78%)	239,508 (33.22%)

=== 1968 ===
Measure name	Description	Status	Yes votes	No votes
Amendment 1 (May 7)	A constitutional amendment allowing school district superintendents to be appointed	Passed	286,264 (55.42%)	230,245 (44.58%)
Amendment 1 (November 5)	A constitutional amendment generally modifying the Florida Constitution	Passed	645,233 (55.42%)	518,940 (44.58%)
Amendment 2	A constitutional amendment modifying the Constitution's language relating to voting rights	Passed	625,980 (55.71%)	497,752 (44.29%)
Amendment 3	A constitutional amendment relating to counties and cities	Passed	625,347 (55.13%)	508,962 (44.87%)

=== 1969 ===
Measure name	Description	Status	Yes votes	No votes
Amendment 1	A constitutional amendment temporarily suspending the prohibition on bonds	Passed	--	--

=== 1970 ===
Measure name	Description	Status	Yes votes	No votes
Amendment 1	A constitutional amendment providing the right to vote to those eighteen years or older	Failed	501,764 (39.95%)	754,282 (60.05%)
Amendment 2	A constitutional amendment making eighteen the legal age of adulthood	Failed	422,450 (34.56%)	799,885 (65.44%)
Amendment 3	A constitutional amendment restructuring the state court system	Failed	503,992 (48.92%)	526,328 (51.08%)
Amendment 4	A constitutional amendment allowing the state to issue bonds for the purpose of funding pollution control efforts	Passed	819,629 (71.22%)	331,250 (28.78%)
Amendment 5	A constitutional amendment restricting the sale of submerged lands to situations where it matches the public interest	Passed	680,223 (61.27%)	429,917 (38.73%)
Amendment 6	A constitutional amendment changing the term length of the state House of Representatives from two years to four years	Failed	435,052 (39.18%)	675,473 (60.82%)
Amendment 7	A constitutional amendment modifying the system of payment for school construction	Failed	488,442 (42.89%)	650,500 (57.11%)

=== 1971 ===
Measure name	Description	Status	Yes votes	No votes
Amendment 1	A constitutional amendment creating a corporate income tax	Passed	841,433 (70.33%)	355,023 (29.67%)

=== 1972 ===
Measure name	Description	Status	Yes votes	No votes
Amendment 1	A constitutional amendment modifying the state trial court system	Passed	933,221 (70.51%)	390,223 (29.49%)
Amendment 2 (March 14)	A constitutional amendment allowing the state to establish a fund for student loans	Passed	862,300 (65.56%)	453,050 (34.44%)
Straw Poll 1	An advisory question asking whether Floridians would support a constitutional amendment prohibiting forced busing	Passed	1,103,856 (74.06%)	386,724 (25.94%)
Straw Poll 2	An advisory question asking whether Floridians supported equal opportunity in education	Passed	1,065,393 (78.61%)	289,839 (21.39%)
Straw Poll 3	An advisory question asking whether Floridians supported a constitutional amendment allowing prayer in public schools	Passed	1,133,079 (79.35%)	294,848 (20.65%)
Referendum 1	A constitutional amendment allowing the state to issue bonds for the purpose of funding environmentally endangered lands	Passed	1,256,292 (71.14%)	509,679 (28.86%)
Amendment 2 (November 7)	A constitutional amendment allowing the state to issue bonds for the purpose of acquiring land for conservation and outdoor recreation use	Passed	1,284,817 (73.03%)	474,514 (26.97%)
Amendment 3	A constitutional amendment allowing citizen initiatives to modify multiple parts of the Florida Constitution	Passed	1,157,648 (70.86%)	476,165 (29.14%)
Amendment 4	A constitutional amendment allowing motor vehicle license fees to be used to fund school construction	Passed	1,191,118 (69.15%)	531,520 (30.85%)
Amendment 5	A constitutional amendment modifying the language related to property inheritance	Passed	1,137,725 (67.20%)	555,426 (32.80%)

=== 1974 ===
Measure name	Description	Status	Yes votes	No votes
Amendment 1	A constitutional amendment allowing the state to issue bonds for the purpose of school construction	Passed	846,071 (65.40%)	447,599 (34.60%)
Amendment 2	A constitutional amendment extending the gas tax	Failed	547,435 (44.04%)	695,523 (55.96%)
Amendment 3	A constitutional amendment changing the Tax Assessor to the Property Appraiser	Passed	722,889 (57.51%)	534,071 (42.49%)
Amendment 4	A constitutional amendment requiring the Senate to approve members of the Game and Fresh Water commission	Passed	859,517 (70.08%)	366,965 (29.92%)
Amendment 5	A constitutional amendment modifying the authority of the Judicial Qualifications Commission	Passed	946,006 (78.17%)	264,161 (21.83%)
Amendment 6	A constitutional amendment allowing electric utilities to be governed by public-private partnerships	Passed	658,790 (55.99%)	517,926 (44.01%)
Amendment 7	A constitutional amendment prohibiting discrimination based on disability	Passed	974,892 (76.43%)	300,633 (23.57%)

=== 1976 ===
Measure name	Description	Status	Yes votes	No votes
Amendment 1 (March 9)	A constitutional amendment limiting the amount the state can tax for water management	Passed	--	--
Amendment 1 (November 2)	A constitutional amendment to require political candidates to publicly disclose their finances	Passed	1,765,626 (79.26%)	461,940 (20.74%)
Amendment 2	A constitutional amendment changing the requirements for Supreme Court justices	Passed	1,600,944 (75.23%)	527,056 (24.77%)
Amendment 3	A constitutional amendment modify the procedures of the Judicial Qualifications Commission	Passed	1,514,623 (72.85%)	564,441 (27.15%)
Amendment 4	A constitutional amendment modifying property taxes and state bonds	Failed	949,480 (46.35%)	1,099,055 (53.65%)
Amendment 5	A constitutional amendment allowing the state to issue bonds for the purpose of housing finance	Failed	974,184 (48.77%)	1,023,416 (51.23%)
Amendment 6	A constitutional amendment limiting the number of government employees to a percentage pegged to population	Failed	986,727 (47.86%)	1,074,822 (52.14%)
Amendment 7	A constitutional amendment allowing the legislature to overrule state executive rules	Failed	729,400 (37.61%)	1,210,001 (62.39%)
Amendment 8	A constitutional amendment allowing the state to increase retirement benefits	Passed	1,254,413 (62.39%)	756,043 (37.61%)
Amendment 9	A constitutional amendment creating a commission to oversee the state capitol building and government mansion	Failed	619,151 (30.16%)	1,433,878 (69.84%)

=== 1978 ===
Measure name	Description	Status	Yes votes	No votes
Amendment 1	A constitutional amendment revising nearly every aspect of the Florida Constitution	Failed	623,703 (29.20%)	1,512,106 (70.80%)
Amendment 2	A constitutional amendment making sex discrimination illegal	Failed	1,002,479 (43.10%)	1,323,497 (56.90%)
Amendment 3	A constitutional amendment changing to single-member legislative districts	Failed	982,747 (46.88%)	1,113,394 (53.12%)
Amendment 4	A constitutional amendment eliminating the executive cabinet	Failed	540,979 (25.10%)	1,614,630 (74.90%)
Amendment 5	A constitutional amendment creating a public service commission	Failed	772,0666 (35.95%)	1,375,548 (64.05%)
Amendment 6	A constitutional amendment requiring circuit ad county judges to run for re-election every six years	Failed	1,058,574 (49.14%)	1,095,756 (50.86%)
Amendment 7	A constitutional amendment revising tax laws	Failed	779,389 (36.29%)	1,368,346 (63.71%)
Amendment 8	A constitutional amendment modifying the Florida State Board of Education	Failed	771,282 (36.29%)	1,353,986 (63.71%)
Amendment 9	A constitutional amendment authorizing some casinos	Failed	687,460 (28.55%)	1,720,275 (71.45%)

=== 1980 ===
Measure name	Description	Status	Yes votes	No votes
Amendment 1 (March 11)	A constitutional amendment changing the homestead tax exemption	Passed	1,088,729 (69.59%)	475,834 (30.41%)
Amendment 2 (March 11)	A constitutional amendment modifying the Supreme Court's jurisdiction	Passed	940,420 (67.14%)	460,266 (32.86%)
Amendment 1 (October 7)	A constitutional amendment providing a tax exemption for renewable energy devices	Passed	1,042,685 (74.99%)	347,766 (25.01%)
Amendment 2 (October 7)	A constitutional amendment allowing the state to issue bonds for the purpose of building additional housing	Passed	826,742 (57.20%)	618,694 (42.80%)
Amendment 3 (October 7)	A constitutional amendment allowing for expanded tax exemptions for businesses	Passed	916,043 (62.84%)	541,630 (37.16%)
Amendment 4 (October 7)	A constitutional amendment expanding tax exemptions for homesteads	Passed	1,251,096 (81.20%)	289,620 (18.80%)
Amendment 5 (October 7)	A constitutional amendment exempting business inventory and livestock from taxation	Passed	1,003,979 (69.41%)	442,386 (30.59%)
Amendment 1 (November 4)	A constitutional amendment to abolish the Florida Constitution Revision Commission	Failed	1,164,824 (43.50%)	1,512,682 (56.50%)
Amendment 2 (November 4)	A constitutional amendment establishing a constitutional right to privacy	Passed	1,722,987 (60.60%)	1,120,302 (39.40%)
Amendment 3 (November 4)	A constitutional amendment changing the order of the legislative process	Passed	1,763,624 (66.88%)	873,211 (33.12%)
Amendment 4 (November 4)	A constitutional amendment allowing bonds to be issued for the purpose of improving water facilities	Passed	1,826,026 (66.99%)	899,906 (33.01%)
Amendment 5 (November 4)	A constitutional amendment modifying the state gas tax	Passed	1,498,801 (55.63%)	1,195,483 (44.37%)

=== 1982 ===
Measure name	Description	Status	Yes votes	No votes
Amendment 2	A constitutional amendment providing a right for citizens to be free from unreasonable search and seizure	Passed	1,440,523 (63.48%)	828,571 (36.52%)
Amendment 3	A constitutional amendment extending pretrial release to most people charged with a crime	Passed	1,412,269 (60.63%)	917,092 (39.37%)

=== 1984 ===
Measure name	Description	Status	Yes votes	No votes
Amendment 1	A constitutional amendment extending the homestead exemption	Passed	2,766,516 (79.01%)	734,785 (20.99%)
Amendment 2	A constitutional amendment allowing the state to disburse funds electronically	Passed	2,467,025 (72.84%)	919,675 (27.16%)
Amendment 3	A constitutional amendment empowering the judicial nominating commissions to create standardized rules	Passed	2,720,297 (82.15%)	590,960 (17.85%)
Amendment 4	A constitutional amendment declaring that legislators' speech is privileged	Failed	1,110,743 (33.38%)	2,216,910 (66.62%)
Amendment 5	A constitutional amendment removing some restrictions relating to county commissioners	Passed	2,150,510 (64.27%)	1,195,654 (35.73%)
Amendment 6	A constitutional amendment requiring county court judges be members of the Florida Bar Association	Passed	2,529,436 (75.45%)	823,219 (24.55%)
Amendment 7	A constitutional amendment altering rules relating to state bonds	Passed	2,095,916 (65.38%)	1,109,900 (34.62%)
Amendment 8	A constitutional amendment providing a levy to allow public education bonds	Passed	2,553,332 (76.64%)	778,114 (23.36%)

=== 1986 ===
Measure name	Description	Status	Yes votes	No votes
Amendment 1	A constitutional amendment allowing the Florida Attorney General to appoint a prosecutor specifically working on multicircuit violations	Passed	2,168,701 (72.78%)	811,122 (27.22%)
Amendment 2	A constitutional amendment allowing casino gambling in large hotels provided a county approves of gambling	Failed	1,036,250 (31.65%)	2,237,555 (68.35%)
Amendment 3	A constitutional amendment modifying the homestead tax exemption	Failed	1,127,438 (35.53%)	2,045,473 (64.47%)
Amendment 4	A constitutional amendment requiring the Florida Supreme Court to provide advisory opinions on the constitutionality of ballot measures	Passed	1,988,841 (72.36%)	759,691 (27.64%)
Amendment 5	A constitutional amendment authorizing the Florida State Lottery	Passed	2,039,437 (63.57%)	1,168,858 (36.43%)

=== 1988 ===
Measure name	Description	Status	Yes votes	No votes
Amendment 1	A constitutional amendment to open county court judges to the possibility of impeachment	Passed	2,840,296 (72.34%)	1,085,751 (27.66%)
Amendment 2	A constitutional amendment to allow crime victims more information about criminal proceedings	Passed	3,629,963 (90.19%)	394,617 (9.81%)
Amendment 3	A constitutional amendment to change land classification procedures	Passed	2,423,783 (67.12%)	1,187,303 (32.88%)
Amendment 4	A constitutional amendment to allow the state to issue bonds for the purpose of funding new road construction	Passed	2,141,987 (57.20%)	1,602,965 (42.80%)
Amendment 5	A constitutional amendment extending the widow's property tax exemption to widowers	Passed	3,415,074 (85.19%)	593,913 (14.81%)
Amendment 6	A constitutional amendment creating the Florida Taxation and Budget Reform Commission	Passed	2,111,320 (57.85%)	1,538,470 (42.15%)
Amendment 7	A constitutional amendment increasing county judge's terms from four years to six years	Failed	1,493,839 (37.93%)	2,444,181 (62.07%)
Amendment 8	A constitutional amendment allowing the legislature to creating a system for processing civil traffic offenses	Passed	2,736,373 (70.46%)	1,147,126 (29.54%)
Amendment 9	A constitutional amendment creating the Florida Department of Veterans Affairs and the Florida Department of Elderly Affairs	Passed	2,723,848 (68.96%)	1,225,915 (31.04%)
Amendment 10	A constitutional amendment limiting damages in civil actions	Failed	1,837,041 (43.41%)	2,394,932 (56.59%)
Amendment 11	A constitutional amendment classifying English as the official language of Florida	Passed	3,457,039 (83.87%)	664,861 (16.13%)

=== 1990 ===
Measure name	Description	Status	Yes votes	No votes
Amendment 1	A constitutional amendment modifying the state legislature meeting schedule	Passed	2,615,449 (83.60%)	513,970 (16.40%)
Amendment 2	A constitutional amendment to mandate a three-day waiting period between purchase and delivery of a handgun	Passed	2,840,912 (84.50%)	522,248 (15.50%)
Amendment 3	A constitutional amendment allowing localities to opt-out of some normally required spending	Passed	2,031,557 (64.50%)	522,248 (15.50%)
Amendment 4	A constitutional amendment strengthening government transparency	Passed	2,795,784 (87.70%)	392,323 (12.30%)

=== 1992 ===
Measure name	Description	Status	Yes votes	No votes
Amendment 1	A constitutional amendment to allow the state to delay an election due to a state of emergency	Passed	3,369,434 (71.60%)	1,337,289 (28.40%)
Amendment 2	A constitutional amendment expanding the public's ability to access government records and meetings	Passed	3,883,637 (83.00%)	793,232 (17.00%)
Amendment 3	A constitutional amendment permitting localities to authorize property tax exemptions for historic properties	Passed	2,908,745 (62.40%)	1,752,490 (37.60%)
Amendment 4	A constitutional amendment modifying the state budget process	Passed	3,815,563 (82.70%)	796,463 (17.30%)
Amendment 5	A constitutional amendment requiring the state legislature pass a Taxpayer's Bill of Rights	Passed	4,258,446 (90.02%)	472,325 (9.98%)
Amendment 6	A constitutional amendment authorizing localities to adopt a sales tax if approved by voters	Failed	1,886,498 (40.04%)	2,824,460 (59.96%)
Amendment 8	A constitutional amendment continuing to require some tax revenue be dedicated to public school construction	Passed	3,089,058 (67.90%)	1,461,435 (32.10%)
Amendment 9	A constitutional amendment adding term limits for most elected officials	Passed	3,625,500 (76.77%)	1,097,127 (23.23%)
Amendment 10	A constitutional amendment limiting homestead property valuation increases to 3% annually	Passed	2,493,761 (53.65%)	2,154,752 (46.35%)

=== 1994 ===
Measure name	Description	Status	Yes votes	No votes
Amendment 1	A constitutional amendment modifying the state legislature meeting schedule	Passed	2,713,189 (73.96%)	955,223 (26.04%)
Amendment 2	A constitutional amendment limiting state revenue collections	Passed	2,182,411 (59.44%)	1,489,268 (40.56%)
Amendment 3	A constitutional amendment prohibiting the use of entangling nets in Florida waters	Passed	2,876,091 (71.70%)	1,135,110 (28.30%)
Amendment 4	A constitutional amendment limiting the governments power to raise revenue	Passed	2,167,305 (58.14%)	1,560,635 (41.86%)
Amendment 8	A constitutional amendment authorizing casinos in some counties	Failed	1,566,451 (38.71%)	2,555,492 (61.29%)

=== 1996 ===
Measure name	Description	Status	Yes votes	No votes
Amendment 1	A constitutional amendment requiring tax increase amendments reach a two-thirds threshold to go into effect	Passed	3,372,915 (69.30%)	1,497,485 (30.70%)
Amendment 2	A constitutional amendment modifying the authority of the Florida Constitution Revision Commission	Passed	2,733,993 (61.40%)	1,720,193 (38.60%)
Amendment 3	A constitutional amendment expanding the authority of the Judicial Qualifications Commission	Passed	3,436,753 (74.90%)	1,153,367 (25.10%)
Amendment 4	A constitutional amendment increasing the sugar tax in support of conservation efforts	Failed	2,328,016 (45.60%)	2,774,806 (54.40%)
Amendment 5	A constitutional amendment requiring polluters in the Everglades pay pollution reduction costs	Passed	3,397,286 (68.10%)	1,594,175 (31.90%)
Amendment 6	A constitutional amendment establishing an Everglades trust fund	Passed	2,825,819 (57.30%)	2,108,286 (42.70%)

=== 1998 ===
Measure name	Description	Status	Yes votes	No votes
Amendment 1	A constitutional amendment modifying property taxes	Passed	1,970,419 (54.50%)	1,646,069 (45.50%)
Amendment 2	A constitutional amendment continuing death sentences if the method of execution is changed	Passed	2,676,043 (72.76%)	1,002,043 (27.24%)
Amendment 3	A constitutional amendment increasing the homestead tax exemption for low-income seniors	Passed	2,560,979 (68.50%)	1,180,341 (31.50%)
Amendment 4	A constitutional amendment clarifying that filing records at county branch offices is the same as filing them at a main office	Passed	2,540,872 (74.10%)	887,999 (25.90%)
Amendment 5	A constitutional amendment creating the Fish and Wildlife Conservation Commission	Passed	2,630,674 (72.30%)	1,007,905 (27.70%)
Amendment 6	A constitutional amendment describing children's education as "a paramount duty of the state"	Passed	2,623,889 (71.00%)	1,069,406 (29.00%)
Amendment 7	A constitutional amendment modifying the judicial system at the circuit and county level	Passed	2,028,165 (56.90%)	1,536,523 (43.10%)
Amendment 8	A constitutional amendment restructuring the state cabinet	Passed	1,950,311 (55.50%)	1,562,234 (44.50%)
Amendment 9	A constitutional amendment strengthening language relating to basic rights	Passed	2,416,324 (66.30%)	1,230,683 (33.70%)
Amendment 10	A constitutional amendment expanding some local property tax exemptions	Failed	1,754,747 (49.83%)	1,766,490 (50.17%)
Amendment 11	A constitutional amendment relating to ballot access	Passed	2,239,607 (64.10%)	1,253,150 (35.90%)
Amendment 12	A constitutional amendment allowing counties to establish their own background check requirement for gun purchases	Passed	2,655,010 (72.00%)	1,033,020 (28.00%)
Amendment 13	A constitutional amendment updating language in the state constitution	Passed	1,869,111 (55.00%)	1,530,883 (45.00%)

== 2000– ==
=== 2000 ===
Measure name	Description	Status	Yes votes	No votes
Amendment 1	A constitutional amendment requiring the government to construct a high-speed rail system	Passed	2,900,253 (52.66%)	2,607,495 (47.34%)
Selection of Circuit Court Judges	A question regarding whether circuit court judges should be appointed rather than elected	Failed (Note: Vote was tabulated separately for each individual judicial circuit, each of which voted against the measure. Full results can be found at the reference.)		
Selection of County Court Judges	A question regarding whether county court judges should be appointed rather than elected	Failed (Note: Vote was tabulated separately for each individual county, each of which voted against the measure. Full results can be found at the reference.)		

=== 2002 ===
Measure name	Description	Status	Yes votes	No votes
Amendment 1	A constitutional amendment to allow the death penalty to apply retroactively	Passed	3.169,542 (69.70%)	1,377,678 (30.30%)
Amendment 2	A constitutional amendment to require the legislature to provide an economic impact statement for all ballot measures	Passed	3,583,379 (78.01%)	1,010,254 (21.99%)
Amendment 3	A constitutional amendment relating to Miami-Dade County	Failed	1,982,160 (47.85%)	2,160,512 (52.15%)
Amendment 4	A constitutional amendment to require a supermajority vote for laws relating to public meetings and records keeping	Passed	3,474,978 (76.64%)	1,059,183 (23.36%)
Amendment 6	A constitutional amendment extending the prohibition on indoor smoking to more environments	Passed	3,501,161 (70.97%)	1,431,966 (29.03%)
Amendment 7	A constitutional amendment to provide new property tax exemptions on senior housing	Passed	3,206,142 (67.30%)	1,557,694 (32.70%)
Amendment 8	A constitutional amendment requiring the creation of free, universal pre-kindergarten	Passed	2,868,500 (59.23%)	1,974,408 (40.77%)
Amendment 9	A constitutional amendment requiring the legislature to restrict maximum class sizes in public schools	Passed	2,550,201 (52.39%)	2,317,671 (47.61%)
Amendment 10	A constitutional amendment preventing the confinement of pigs during pregnancy	Passed	2,608,996 (54.75%)	2,155,911 (42.25%)
Amendment 11	A constitutional amendment creating a system of local trustee boards for the state university system	Passed	2,813,145 (60.52%)	1,834,816 (39.48%)

=== 2004 ===
Measure name	Description	Status	Yes votes	No votes
Amendment 1	A constitutional amendment allowing the legislature to pass a law requiring the notification of minor's guardians if a minor seeks an abortion	Passed	4,639,635 (64.67%)	2,534,910 (35.33%)
Amendment 2	A constitutional amendment to change the deadline to file an initiative	Passed	4,574,361 (68.44%)	2,109,013 (31.56%)
Amendment 3	A constitutional amendment to limit lawyer compensation from medical liability claim settlements	Passed	4,583,164 (63.58%)	2,622,143 (36.38%)
Amendment 4	A constitutional amendment allowing Miami-Dade and Broward counties to legalize slot machines	Passed	3,631,261 (50.83%)	3,512,181 (49.17%)
Amendment 5	A constitutional amendment to set the state minimum wage to $6.15 an hour, adjusted for inflation	Passed	5,198,514 (71.25%)	2,097,151 (28.75%)
Amendment 6	A constitutional amendment removing the constitutional requirement to build a high speed rail line	Passed	4,519,423 (63.72%)	2,573,280 (36.28%)
Amendment 7	A constitutional amendment allowing patients to request records of medical incidents at Florida medical facilities	Passed	5,849,125 (81.16%)	1,358,183 (18.84%)
Amendment 8	A constitutional amendment prohibiting doctors with multiple malpractice incidents from practicing medicine	Passed	5,121,841 (71.08%)	2,083,864 (28.92%)

=== 2006 ===
Measure name	Description	Status	Yes votes	No votes
Amendment 1	A constitutional amendment to create a budget-planning committee jointly controlled by the Governor, State Senate, and State House of Representatives	Passed	2,570,436 (59.84%)	1,724,867 (40.16%)
Amendment 3	A constitutional amendment to require future constitutional amendments reach a 60% vote threshold to pass	Passed	2,600,969 (57.78%)	1,900,359 (42.22%)
Amendment 4	A constitutional amendment creating a statewide tobacco education and prevention program	Passed	2,786,935 (60.93%)	1,787,230 (39.07%)
Amendment 6	A constitutional amendment allowing counties to increase the homestead property tax exemption for seniors	Passed	3,533,101 (76.39%)	1,092,128 (23.61%)
Amendment 7	A constitutional amendment lowering property taxes on disabled veterans	Passed	3,552,441 (77.83%)	1,011,958 (22.17%)
Amendment 8	A constitutional amendment restricting the state's ability to use eminent domain	Passed	3,047,420 (69.05%)	1,365,950 (30.95%)

=== 2008 ===
Measure name	Description	Status	Yes votes	No votes
Amendment 1 (January 29)	A constitutional amendment to substantially modify the property tax system for property owners who move to new properties	Passed	2,667,543 (64.08%)	1,495,270 (35.92%)
Amendment 1 (November 4)	A constitutional amendment to modify the legislature's power over foreign citizens property rights	Failed	3,564,090 (47.93%)	3,871,704 (52.07%)
Amendment 2	A constitutional amendment to define marriage as being between one man and one woman	Passed	4,890,883 (61.92%)	3,008,026 (38.08%)
Amendment 3	A constitutional amendment to exempt some home improvements from property tax	Passed	4,351,975 (60.51%)	2,839,825 (39.49%)
Amendment 4	A constitutional amendment to exempt properties under perpetual conservation protection from property tax	Passed	4,875,162 (68.56%)	2,235,969 (31.44%)
Amendment 6	A constitutional amendment modifying property tax exemptions for waterfront properties	Passed	4,983,313 (70.63%)	2,072,041 (29.37%)
Amendment 8	A constitutional amendment allowing localities to levy property taxes for the purpose of community college funding	Failed	3,210,481 (43.55%)	4,161,731 (56.45%)

=== 2010 ===
Measure name	Description	Status	Yes votes	No votes
Amendment 1	A constitutional amendment to allow candidates to repeal public financing of statewide candidates	Failed (Note: Constitutional amendments on the ballot past 2006 require a 60% supermajority vote to pass.)	2,587,543 (52.49%)	2,342,137 (47.51%)
Amendment 2	A constitutional amendment expanding the homestead exemption to members of the military in certain circumstances	Passed	3,936,526 (77.82%)	1,122,053 (22.18%)
Amendment 4	A constitutional amendment requiring that changes to local government comprehensive plans require voter approval	Failed	1,682,177 (32.95%)	3,424,204 (67.06%)
Amendment 4	A constitutional amendment modifying the redistricting process	Passed	3,155,149 (62.59%)	1,885,860 (37.41%)
Amendment 6	A constitutional amendment modifying the redistricting process	Passed	3,153,199 (62.93%)	1,857,748 (37.07%)
Amendment 8	A constitutional amendment to change maximum class sizes in public schools to average class sizes	Failed	2,751,878 (54.49%)	2,298,001 (45.51%)

=== 2012 ===
Measure name	Description	Status	Yes votes	No votes
Amendment 1	A constitutional amendment to prohibit a universal healthcare system	Failed	3,632,315 (48.50%)	3,856,608 (51.50%)
Amendment 2	A constitutional amendment providing property tax discounts to disabled veterans	Passed	4,907,341 (63.25%)	2,850,880 (36.75%)
Amendment 3	A constitutional amendment to modify the state's revenue limit	Failed	3,204,350 (42.44%)	4,346,740 (57.56%)
Amendment 4	A constitutional amendment to modify the state's homestead exemptions	Failed	3,244,138 (43.18%)	4,268,467 (56.82%)
Amendment 5	A constitutional amendment to substantially reform the Judicial Qualifications Commission	Failed	2,728,008 (36.95%)	4,654,167 (63.05%)
Amendment 6	A constitutional amendment to prohibit state funds being used for abortions	Failed	3,511,354 (44.90%)	4,308,408 (55.10%)
Amendment 8	A constitutional amendment allowing state funds to be used to benefit religious organizations	Failed	3,441,128 (44.53%)	4,286,376 (55.47%)
Amendment 9	A constitutional amendment authorizing the legislature to exempt surviving spouses of first responders from property tax	Passed	4,747,536 (61.68%)	2,950,083 (38.32%)
Amendment 10	A constitutional amendment providing an exemption to ad valorem taxes on properties between $25,000 and $50,000 in value	Failed	3,432,905 (45.49%)	4,113,395 (54.51%)
Amendment 11	A constitutional amendment allowing counties to offer property tax exemptions to low-income seniors	Passed	4,717,827 (61.26%)	2,984,270 (38.74%)
Amendment 12	A constitutional amendment modifying the appointment process to the University System Board of Governors	Failed	3,060,425 (41.55%)	4,306,088 (58.45%)

=== 2014 ===
Measure name	Description	Status	Yes votes	No votes
Amendment 1	A constitutional amendment to fund the Florida Land Acquisition Trust Fund with 33% of revenue from excise taxes	Passed	4,238,739 (74.96%)	1,415,924 (25.04%)
Amendment 2	A constitutional amendment to legalize the use of medical marijuana for people with certain health conditions	Failed	3,370,761 (57.62%)	2,478,993 (42.38%)
Amendment 3	A constitutional amendment to provide the Governor of Florida greater ability to fill judicial vacancies	Failed	2.576,737 (47.90%)	2,802,541 (52.10%)

=== 2016 ===
Measure name	Description	Status	Yes votes	No votes
Amendment 1	A constitutional amendment to give Florida citizens the right to own solar energy equipment and prevent the subsidization of solar energy by other citizens	Failed	4.560,682 (50.79%)	4,418,788 (49.21%)
Amendment 2	A constitutional amendment to legalize the use of medical marijuana for people with certain health conditions	Passed	6,518,919 (71.32%)	2,621,845 (28.68%)
Amendment 3	A constitutional amendment providing property tax exemptions to first responders permanently disabled in the line of duty	Passed	7,495,226 (83.78%)	1,451,074 (16.22%)
Amendment 4 (Note: Amendment was on the August 30 primary election ballot)	A constitutional amendment providing property tax exemptions to homeowners with renewable energy equipment	Passed	1,975,257 (72.62%)	744,891 (27.38%)
Amendment 5	A constitutional amendment clarifying the rules surrounding property tax exemptions for elderly homeowners	Passed	6,891,472 (78.30%)	1,909,963 (21.70%)

=== 2018 ===
Measure name	Description	Status	Yes votes	No votes
Amendment 1	A constitutional amendment to provide a homestead exemption on the assessed value of homes between $100,000 and $125,000	Failed	4,560,689 (58.06%)	3,293,857 (41.94%)
Amendment 2	A constitutional amendment to permanently adopt a limit on some property tax increases to 10% a year	Passed	5,162,544 (66.49%)	2,601,316 (33.51%)
Amendment 3	A constitutional amendment to provide voters the exclusive right to determine whether to authorize casino gambling	Passed	5,676,456 (71.47%)	2,266,516 (28.53%)
Amendment 4	A constitutional amendment to restore voting rights to most felons upon the completion of their sentences	Passed	5,148,926 (64.55%)	2,828,339 (35.45%)
Amendment 5	A constitutional amendment requiring a two-thirds vote in the Florida State Legislature for all new taxes and tax increases	Passed	5,164,658 (65.73%)	2,693,174 (34.27%)
Amendment 6	A constitutional amendment to encode victim's rights, increase the judicial retirement age to 75, and prohibit courts from utilizing state agency's interpretation of law	Passed	4,835,950 (61.61%)	3,013,601 (38.39%)
Amendment 7	A constitutional amendment to provide death benefits to the spouses of first responders, active-duty military members, restrict the ability of the government to increase college fees, and encode the state university system	Passed	5,148,300 (65.76%)	2,680,942 (34.24%)
Amendment 9	A constitutional amendment to ban offshore drilling in state waters and to ban vaping in indoor workplaces	Passed	5,415,308 (68.92%)	2,442,410 (31.08%)
Amendment 10	A constitutional amendment to require the legislature to create a state Department of Veterans Affairs, a state Office of Domestic Security and Counter-Terrorism, modify the legislature meeting schedule, and prohibit counties from abolishing some local elected offices	Passed	4,847,740 (63.15%)	2,828,607 (36.85%)
Amendment 11	A constitutional amendment to allow foreign-born people from owning property, repeal an outdated provision requiring the development of a high-speed rail system, and repeal a provision stating that changes to the criminal code do not affect penalties for crimes committed before the change	Passed	4,680,526 (63.15%)	2,852,468 (37.87%)
Amendment 12	A constitutional amendment prohibiting public officials from engaging in paid lobbying while in office and for six years after leaving office	Passed	6,116,404 (78.92%)	1,633,249 (21.08%)
Amendment 13	A constitutional amendment banning gambling on dog races in Florida	Passed	5,407,543 (69.06%)	2,423,126 (30.94%)

=== 2020 ===
Measure name	Description	Status	Yes votes	No votes
Amendment 1	A constitutional amendment to prohibit non-citizens from voting in Florida elections	Passed	8,307,109 (79.29%)	2,169,684 (20.71%)
Amendment 2	A constitutional amendment raising the state minimum wage to $15 an hour	Passed	6,391,753 (60.82%)	4,117,815 (39.18%)
Amendment 3	A constitutional amendment establishing a top-two open primary system for state offices	Failed	5,854,468 (57.03%)	4,410,768 (42.97%)
Amendment 4	A constitutional amendment requiring all voter-approved constitutional amendments to be approved two elections in a row before going into effect	Failed	4,853,402 (47.53%)	5,356,792 (52.47%)
Amendment 5	A constitutional amendment loosening restrictions on homeowners taking advantage of some property tax benefits	Passed	7,484,104 (74.49%)	2,562,387 (25.51%)
Amendment 6	A constitutional amendment allowing veteran's property tax benefits to transfer to their spouse upon death	Passed	9,305,503 (89.73%)	1,065,308 (10.27%)

=== 2022 ===
Measure name	Description	Status	Yes votes	No votes
Amendment 1	A constitutional amendment to allow the legislature to prohibit flood resistance improvements from impacting a property's assessed value	Failed	4,215,542 (58.7%)	2,968,686 (41.3%)
Amendment 2	A constitutional amendment abolishing the Florida Constitution Revision Commission	Failed	3,744,873 (53.9%)	3,206,717 (46.1%)
Amendment 3	A constitutional amendment allowing the legislature to provide public service workers a $50,000 property tax exemption	Failed	4,015,949 (57.3%)	2,997,125 (42.7%)

=== 2024 ===
Measure name	Origin	Description	Status	Yes votes	No votes
Amendment 1 (Partisan Elections of School Boards)	Legislatively referred	A constitutional amendment making school board elections partisan	Failed	5,492,282 (54.9%)	4,511,103 (45.1%)
Amendment 2 (Right to Fish and Hunt)	Legislatively referred	A constitutional amendment establishing a guaranteed right to fishing and hunting within Florida	Passed	6,940,273 (67.35%)	3,364,983 (32.65%)
Amendment 3 (Adult Personal Use of Marijuana)	Citizen initiated	A constitutional amendment legalizing the recreational use of marijuana for adults	Failed	5,949,029 (55.9%)	4,692,922 (44.1%)
Amendment 4 (Amendment to Limit Government Interference with Abortion)	Citizen initiated	A constitutional amendment establishing a guaranteed right to an abortion in Florida	Failed	6,069,089 (57.2%)	4,547,877 (42.8%)
Amendment 5 (Annual Adjustments to the Value of Certain Homestead Exemptions)	Legislatively referred	A constitutional amendment requiring homestead exemptions be adjusted for inflation every year	Passed	6,686,003 (66.0%)	3,440,877 (34.0%)
Amendment 6 (Repeal of Public Campaign Financing Requirement)	Legislatively referred	A constitutional amendment repealing Florida's public campaign financing requirement for statewide campaigns	Failed	5,032,081 (50.4%)	4,954,481 (49.6%)

== See also ==
- Elections in Florida
- Law of Florida
