= 2022 Florida Amendment 1 =

Proposed amendment to the Florida Constitution

- November 8, 2022
- Limitation on Assessment of Real Property Used for Residential Purposes
- Outcome: Rejected (failed to reach 60% threshold)

Results
Choice	Votes	%
Yes	4,016,022	57.26%
No	2,997,158	42.74%
Valid votes	7,013,180	89.95%
Invalid or blank votes	783,736	10.05%
Total votes	7,796,916	100.00%
Registered voters/turnout	14,503,978	53.76%

Yes
90–100%
80–90%
70–80%
60–70%
50–60%
No
90–100%
80–90%
70–80%
60–70%
50–60%
Other
Tie
No votes

2022 Florida Amendment 1 was a proposed amendment to the Florida Constitution, which failed on November 8, 2022.

The referendum sought to disallow improvements made to residential property for the purposes of preventing flood damage from being used to increase the assessed value of the property for taxation purposes.

Through a statewide referendum, the amendment achieved only 57.26% support among voters in the U.S. state of Florida, short of the 60% majority required by state law, although only slightly lower than the 2006 vote which implemented the 60% requirement. Had the amendment passed, it would have granted state lawmakers the power to change property tax rules regarding flood resistance.

== Overview ==
Supporters of the amendment included Mike Twitty, Pinellas County Property Appraiser, and Chuck Clemons, a state representative. Opponents of the amendment included the Democratic Parties of Brevard, Lake, Marion, Orange, Seminole, Sumter, and Volusia Counties.

Although the amendment received a majority of the statewide popular vote and won a majority of the popular vote in all but six counties, the 60% threshold prevented it from taking effect.

== Background ==
The amendment was sponsored by state representative Linda Chaney, a Republican. The Tallahassee Democrat, a newspaper in Florida, noted, "Floridians who prepare for rising sea levels and flooding by elevating their buildings won’t get hit with a property-tax increase" if the proposed amendment were to pass.

== Ballot summary ==
The ballot summary read as follows:

Proposing an amendment to the State Constitution, effective January 1, 2023, to authorize the Legislature, by general law, to prohibit the consideration of any change or improvement made to real property used for residential purposes to improve the property's resistance to flood damage in determining the assessed value of such property for ad valorem taxation purposes.

== See also ==
- Elections in Florida
- 2022 Florida elections
