= 2022 Florida Amendment 3 =

Proposed amendment in Florida

- November 8, 2022
- Additional homestead property tax exemption for certain workers
- Outcome: Amendment not adopted (failed to reach 60% threshold)

Results
Choice	Votes	%
Yes	4,215,601	58.68%
No	2,968,734	41.32%
Valid votes	7,184,335	92.14%
Invalid or blank votes	612,581	7.86%
Total votes	7,796,916	100.00%
Registered voters/turnout	14,503,978	53.76%

Yes
90–100%
80–90%
70–80%
60–70%
50–60%
No
90–100%
80–90%
70–80%
60–70%
50–60%
Other
Tie
No votes

2022 Florida Amendment 3 was a proposed constitutional amendment to the Florida Constitution, which failed on November 8, 2022. Through a statewide referendum, the amendment achieved only 58.7% support among voters in the U.S. state of Florida, short of the 60% majority required by state law.

== Background ==
The amendment proposed an increase to the state's homestead tax exemption for specific groups including "teachers, police officers, correctional officers, firefighters, emergency-medical technicians, paramedics, child-welfare services professionals, and active-duty members of the military and Florida National Guard." The Tallahassee Democrat cited "severe teacher and prison-security shortages" as factors contributing to the proposal of the referendum.

== Overview ==
The amendment was sponsored by Josie Tomkow, a Republican state legislator representing Polk City. One state legislator, Democrat Bobby Powell of West Palm Beach, opposed the amendment, along with the Florida League of Women Voters, the Palm Beach Post, and the Tampa Bay Times.

== Results ==
Despite the amendment's failure to win 60% of the vote, it received majority support in all but two counties, and received more than 60% support in many of the state's most populous counties, including Osceola County, Broward County, Palm Beach County, and Escambia County. There was little correlation between county partisanship and levels of support for the amendment.

== See also ==
- Elections in Florida
- 2022 Florida elections
- 2020 Florida Amendment 5
