= Florida Amendment 2 =

Florida Amendment 2 may refer to

- 2008 Florida Amendment 2
- 2014 Florida Amendment 2
- 2016 Florida Amendment 2
- 2020 Florida Amendment 2
- 2022 Florida Amendment 2
- 2024 Florida Amendment 2
