= 2020 Florida Amendment 5 =

- Limitations on Homestead Property Tax Assessments; increased portability period to transfer accrued benefit
- Outcome: Approved

Results
Choice	Votes	%
Yes	7,484,104	74.49%
No	2,562,387	25.51%
Valid votes	10,046,491	90.14%
Invalid or blank votes	1,098,364	9.86%
Total votes	11,144,855	100.00%
Registered voters/turnout	14,441,869	77.17%

Yes
90–100%
80–90%
70–80%
60–70%
50–60%
No
90–100%
80–90%
60–70%
50–60%
Other
Tie
No data

2020 Florida Amendment 5, commonly known as the Extend "Save Our Homes" Portability Period Amendment, was a proposed amendment to the constitution of the US state that passed 74.49% to 25.51% in the 2020 election on November 3, 2020. The amendment increased the period during which a person may transfer "Save Our Homes" benefits to a new homestead property from two years to three years.

== Overview ==
The amendment extended the application for portability from a two-year window to a three-year window. It required 60% support to pass, ultimately receiving 74.49% support. The affected article of the state constitution was Article VII, Section 4; Article XII.

"Save Our Home" benefits in the state are typically between $25,000 and $50,000, which apply as a tax exemption upon transfer of benefits.

== Background ==
State Senator Rick Roth, a Republican, introduced the amendment, receiving unanimous approval within both chambers of the state legislature. Americans for Tax Reform and the Tampa Bay Times editorial board supported the amendment, while the League of Women Voters of Florida opposed it.

Additionally, Florida Today, TCPalm, the Palm Beach Post, the Miami Herald, the Orlando Sentinel, and the Sun Sentinel all supported the proposed amendment.

== Results ==
The amendment received more than the mandatory statewide 60% in all counties. Support was strongest in Collier County on the Gulf Coast, the only county in the state to see more than 80% support. Most counties in the Florida Peninsula supported the amendment with 70 to 80% of the votes, while the Big Bend and Panhandle regions saw the lowest support for the proposal. Leon County, the location of the state capital Tallahassee, saw only 61.9% of voters support the amendment.

== See also ==
- Elections in Florida
- 2020 Florida elections
- 2022 Florida Amendment 3
