= 2022 Florida Amendment 2 =

Proposed amendment to the Florida Constitution

- November 8, 2022
- Abolition of the Constitution Revision Commission.

Results
Choice	Votes	%
Yes	3,744,930	53.87%
No	3,206,762	46.13%
Valid votes	6,951,692	89.16%
Invalid or blank votes	845,224	10.84%
Total votes	7,796,916	100.00%
Registered voters/turnout	14,503,978	53.76%

Yes
90–100%
80–90%
70–80%
60–70%
50–60%
No
90–100%
80–90%
70–80%
60–70%
50–60%
Other
Tie
No votes

2022 Florida Amendment 2 was a proposed amendment to the Florida Constitution, which failed on November 8, 2022. Through a statewide referendum, the amendment achieved only 53.87% support among voters in the U.S. state of Florida, short of the 60% majority required by state law.

== Overview ==
The amendment proposed to remove the 37-member Constitutional Revision Commission, which was formed with the intention of meeting every twenty years to propose changes to Florida's State Constitution.

== Ballot summary ==
The ballot summary read as follows:

Proposing an amendment to the State Constitution to abolish the Constitution Revision Commission, which meets at 20-year intervals and is scheduled to next convene in 2037, as a method of submitting proposed amendments or revisions to the State Constitution to electors of the state for approval. This amendment does not affect the ability to revise or amend the State Constitution through citizen initiative, constitutional convention, the Taxation and Budget Reform Commission, or legislative joint resolution.

== Background ==
The Constitution Revision Commission, or CRC, previously met in 2018. It has been criticized, particularly by Republicans, for bundling "topics like vaping and oil drilling."

The amendment was supported by Jeff Brandes, a Republican State Senator, but State House Representative and Democrat Anna Eskamani opposed it.

== Results ==
Although a majority of voters supported the referendum by a narrow margin of 53.87-46.13, the referendum failed to meet the required 60% majority for implementation. Support for the amendment was strongest in the southwestern counties, Sumter County, and Flagler County, while majorities voted against the amendment in Miami-Dade County, Seminole County, and several counties in northern Florida and the Panhandle.

== See also ==
- Elections in Florida
- 2022 Florida elections
