= 2020 Florida Amendment 3 =

- November 3, 2020
- Establish top-two open primary system
- Outcome: Amendment not adopted (failed to reach 60% threshold)

Results
Choice	Votes	%
Yes	5,854,468	57.03%
No	4,410,768	42.97%
Valid votes	10,265,236	92.11%
Invalid or blank votes	879,619	7.89%
Total votes	11,144,855	100.00%
Registered voters/turnout	14,441,869	77.17%

Yes
90–100%
80–90%
70–80%
60–70%
50–60%
No
90–100%
80–90%
70–80%
60–70%
50–60%
Other
Tie
No data

2020 Florida Amendment 3 was a proposed constitutional amendment subject to state referendum on November 3, 2020, that would have amended the Florida Constitution to establish an open top-two primary system for all state elections held in Florida. The amendment achieved 57% voter support but failed to reach the 60% supermajority required to be enacted.

== Contents ==
The amendment on all statewide ballots read as follows:

No. 3 Constitutional Amendment Article VI, Section 5. Allows all registered voters to vote in primaries for state legislature, governor, and cabinet regardless of political party affiliation. All candidates for an office, including party nominated candidates, appear on the same primary ballot. Two highest vote getters advance to general election. If only two candidates qualify, no primary is held and winner is determined in general election. Candidate's party affiliation may appear on ballot as provided by law. Effective January 1, 2024.

== Results ==
Florida Amendment 3 (2020)
Choice	Votes	%
No	4,410,768	43%
Yes	5,854,468	57%
Total votes	10,265,236	100.0%
Registered voters and turnout	14,441,869	71.1%
