= 2010 Florida Amendment 6 =

Amendment to Florida's Constitution

- November 2, 2010
- Standards for Legislature to Follow in Congressional Redistricting
- Voting system: 60% supermajority of valid votes
- Outcome: Amendment adopted

Results
Choice	Votes	%
Yes	3,153,199	62.93%
No	1,857,748	37.07%
Valid votes	5,010,947	91.77%
Invalid or blank votes	449,626	8.23%
Total votes	5,460,573	100.00%
Registered voters/turnout	11,217,384	48.68%
County results
Yes
70–80%
60–70%
50–60%
No
60–70%
50–60%

A citizen-initiated constitutional referendum was held in the U.S. state of Florida on November 2, 2010 regarding standards for congressional redistricting. An anti-gerrymandering initiative sponsored by Floridians for Fair Elections, the initiative added a new section to Article III of the Constitution of Florida that forbade the state's redistricting authority (currently the Florida Legislature) from drawing congressional district plans that would favor incumbent politicians or any political party, guaranteed the creation of majority-minority districts, and required that districts be as compact and equal in population as possible while respecting existing geographical boundaries such as the state's sixty-seven counties. The amendment passed with 62.93 percent of the vote, a 25.86 percentage point margin.

A similar amendment, 2010 Florida Amendment 5, was also approved on the same day with a near-identical margin. It would accomplish much of the same as Amendment 6, but instead applied to state legislative districts.

== History ==
The measure was approved for circulation on September 28, 2007. The Supreme Court of Florida ruled the measure constitutional on January 29, 2009, and the measure officially made the ballot after circulators submitted the required 676,811 signatures (signed by 8 percent of voters in half of the state's congressional districts and of voters statewide at the last presidential election) to the Florida Secretary of State on January 22, 2010.

== Text of the measure ==
=== Summary ===
Congressional districts or districting plans may not be drawn to favor or disfavor an incumbent or political party. Districts shall not be drawn to deny racial or language minorities the equal opportunity to participate in the political process and elect representatives of their choice. Districts must be contiguous. Unless otherwise required, districts must be compact, as equal in population as feasible, and where feasible must make use of existing city, county and geographical boundaries.

=== Full text ===
Section 20. STANDARDS FOR ESTABLISHING CONGRESSIONAL DISTRICT BOUNDARIES

In establishing Congressional district boundaries:

(1) No apportionment plan or individual district shall be drawn with the intent to favor or disfavor a political party or an incumbent; and districts shall not be drawn with the intent or result of denying or abridging the equal opportunity of racial or language minorities to participate in the political process or to diminish their ability to elect representatives of their choice; and districts shall consist of contiguous territory.

(2) Unless compliance with the standards in this subsection conflicts with the standards in subsection (1) or with federal law, districts shall be as nearly equal in population as is practicable; districts shall be compact; and districts shall, where feasible, utilize existing political and geographical boundaries.

(3) The order in which the standards within sub-sections (1) and (2) of this section are set forth shall not be read to establish any priority of one standard over the other within that subsection.

== Fundraising ==
A total of $12,589,730.97 was spent on campaigning for the measure, $8,670,730.97 in support and $3,919,000.00 in opposition.

== Endorsements ==
For

Leading campaign

- Fair Districts Florida

Politicians

- Charlie Crist, 44th Governor of Florida (2007–2011), 35th Attorney General of Florida (2003–2007), 21st Education Commissioner of Florida (2001–2003), and independent candidate for U.S. Senate in 2010 (Republican)
- Bob Graham, former U.S. Senator from Florida (1987–2005) and 38th Governor of Florida (1979–1987) (Democratic)
- Bob Milligan, former Comptroller of Florida (1995–2003) (Republican)

Organizations

- Florida AARP
- League of Women Voters
- NAACP
- SEIU

Newspapers

- The Miami Herald
- Orlando Sentinel
- Florida Today
- The Tampa Tribune
- The Palm Beach Post
- Bradenton Herald
- Pensacola News Journal
- Naples Daily News
- The News Herald
- Northwest Florida Daily News
- St. Petersburg Times
- South Florida Sun-Sentinel
- The Florida Times-Union
- The Ledger
Against

Leading campaign

- Protect Your Vote

Politicians

- Mike Haridopolos, member of the Florida Senate from the 26th district (2003–2012) and member of the Florida House of Representatives from the 30th district (2000–2003) (Republican)
- Mario Diaz-Balart, member of the U.S. House of Representatives (2003–present) from FL-25 (2003–2011), FL-21 (2011–2013), FL-25 (2013–2023), and FL-26 (2023–present) (Republican)
- Adam Hasner, majority leader of the Florida House of Representatives (2007–2010) from the 87th district (2002–2010) (Republican)
- Gary Siplin, member of the Florida Senate from the 19th district (2002–2012) (Democratic)

Individuals

- Benjamin Chavis, former executive director of the NAACP (1993–1994)

== Results ==
Since 2006 Florida Amendment 3, constitutional amendments required a supermajority of 60 percent of the vote to be adopted.

2010 Florida Amendment 6 results
Choice	Votes	%
For	3,153,199	62.93
Against	1,857,748	37.07
Required majority		60.00
Total	5,010,947	100.00
Valid votes	5,010,947	91.77
Invalid/blank votes	449,626	8.23
Total votes	5,460,573	100.00
Registered voters/turnout	11,217,384	48.68

== See also ==
- 2010 Florida elections
- 2026 Florida redistricting
- List of Florida ballot measures
