= Florida Amendment 1 =

Florida Amendment 1 may refer to

- 1970 Florida Amendment 1, a proposed amendment to lower the voting age to 18 years old in Florida, USA
- 2016 Florida Amendment 1, a proposed amendment regarding solar energy in Florida, USA
