= 1970 Alaska Amendment 1 =

- August 25, 1970

Results
Choice	Votes	%
Yes	36,590	53.96%
No	31,216	46.04%
Valid votes	67,806	100.00%
Invalid or blank votes	0	0.00%
Total votes	67,806	100.00%

On November 3, 1970, Alaska held a ballot initiative in the form of a legislatively-referred constitutional amendment on whether or not to lower the voting age from 19 years old to 18 years old. The amendment was one of many that year about lowering the voting age. This amendment was approved in a vote of 36,590 to 31,216.

== Content ==
This provision amends Article V of the State Constitution which provides for a voting age of nineteen years. The amendment would permit persons eighteen years of age, or older, to vote in any state or local election.

== Results by district ==
Results are listed here by election district; there are no results by borough.

District #	Yes		No		Total
District #	#	%	#	%	Total
1	1,986	53.57%	1,721	46.43%	3,707
2	748	56.41%	578	43.59%	1,326
3	1,073	56.36%	831	43.64%	1,904
4	2,733	53.84%	2,343	46.16%	5,076
5	635	58.85%	444	41.15%	1,079
6	696	48.6%	736	51.4%	1,432
7	973	47.28%	1,085	52.72%	2,058
8	13,983	51.31%	13,267	48.69%	27,250
9	383	47.05%	431	52.95%	814
10	1,614	49%	1,680	51%	3,294
11	902	60.33%	593	39.67%	1,495
12	363	67.22%	177	32.78%	540
13	489	61.51%	306	38.49%	795
14	1,340	79.15%	353	20.85%	1,693
15	941	62.9%	555	37.1%	1,496
16	5,291	50.58%	5,170	49.42%	10,461
17	891	70.66%	370	29.34%	1,261
18	1,073	68.96%	483	31.04%	1,556
19	476	83.66%	93	16.34%	569
Total	36,590	53.96%	31,216	46.04%	67,806

== See also ==
- 1970 United States ballot measures
  - 1970 Florida Amendment 1, another similar measure to lower the voting age but instead to 18 compared to Alaska's 19 but did not pass.
