= 2020 Florida Amendment 2 =

Constitution of Florida amendment to raise the minimum wage

- November 3, 2020
- Increase the state minimum wage to $15 by 2026

Results
Choice	Votes	%
Yes	6,391,753	60.82%
No	4,117,815	39.18%
Valid votes	10,509,568	94.30%
Invalid or blank votes	635,287	5.70%
Total votes	11,144,855	100.00%
Registered voters/turnout	14,441,869	77.17%

Yes
90–100%
80–90%
70–80%
60–70%
50–60%
No
90–100%
80–90%
70–80%
60–70%
50–60%
Other
Tie
No data
- Sources: Florida Department of State, New York Times

2020 Florida Amendment 2 was an amendment to the Constitution of Florida that passed on November 3, 2020, via a statewide referendum concurrent with other elections. The amendment sets to increase the state's hourly minimum wage to $15 by 2026 after which the wage will be adjusted annually for inflation using the Consumer Price Index for Urban Wage Earners and Clerical Workers (CPI-W) beginning in 2027. According to Florida law, amendments to the state constitution require 60% of the popular vote to pass.

== Ballot summary ==
The amendment's ballot summary read as follows:

Raises minimum wage to $10.00 per hour effective September 30th, 2021. Each September 30th thereafter, minimum wage shall increase by $1.00 per hour until the minimum wage reaches $15.00 per hour on September 30th, 2026. From that point forward, future minimum wage increases shall revert to being adjusted annually for inflation starting September 30th, 2027.

== Polling ==
A 60% supermajority vote is required for the amendment to be approved.

Poll source	Date(s) administered	Sample size (Note: Key: A – all adults RV – registered voters LV – likely voters V – unclear)	Margin of error	For (Note: 60% approval is required for a Florida constitutional amendment)	Against	Undecided
University of North Florida	October 1–4, 2020	3,055 (LV)	± 1.8%	60%	37%	3%
Emerson/Newsnation	October 10–12, 2020	645 (LV)	± 3.7%	55.3%	32.9%	11.8%
