= 2010 Florida elections =

Elections were held in Florida on Tuesday, November 2, 2010. Primary elections were held on August 24, 2010.

Florida had 4.6 million Democrats and 4 million Republicans. The latter outpolled Democrats among the 2.4 million independent voters and attracted conservative Democrats in cross-party voting. While running behind Republicans generally, the Democrats ran strongly in every urban area of the state. They lost by lopsided margins in the far Panhandle, Southwest Florida and the Space Coast.

== Federal ==
=== United States Senate ===
Main contenders for Florida's open Senate seat include Republican Marco Rubio, Democrat Kendrick Meek, and independent Charlie Crist, along with many other third-party and independent candidates. Rubio won the election.

=== United States House ===
All twenty-five of Florida's seats in the United States House of Representatives are up for election in 2010. Republicans gained 4 seats to obtain a 19-6 majority in the delegation.

== State ==
=== Governor and Lieutenant Governor ===
Incumbent governor Charlie Crist did not run for re-election, choosing instead to run for election as senator (initially as a Republican, then later as an independent). In Florida, the governor and lieutenant governor run as a ticket.

Republican Rick Scott and Democrat Alex Sink won their respective party's primaries; Scott named Jennifer Carroll as his lieutenant-governor running mate while Sink named Rod Smith. Scott would go on to win the general election by plurality, thus holding the seat for the GOP.

=== State Senate ===
Approximately one-half of the forty seats of the Florida Senate were up for election in 2010.

=== State House of Representatives ===
All 120 seats in the Florida House of Representatives were up for election in 2010.

=== Attorney General ===
Republican Pam Bondi, Democrat Dan Gelber and independent Jim Lewis ran for Florida Attorney General, with Bondi winning the election.

=== Chief financial officer ===
The Republican candidate, Jeff Atwater, won the election.

=== Commissioner of Agriculture ===
The Republican candidate, Adam Putnam, won the election and became the commissioner of agriculture and consumer services.

=== Judicial positions ===
Multiple judicial positions were up for election in 2010, including four justices of the Supreme Court of Florida.

- Florida judicial elections, 2010 at Ballotpedia

=== Ballot measures ===
Seven measures were certified for the 2010 ballot; of those, six were constitutional amendments, and one was an advisory referendum.

- 2010 Florida Amendment 1
- 2010 Florida Amendment 2
- 2010 Florida Amendment 4
- 2010 Florida Amendment 5
- 2010 Florida Amendment 6
- 2010 Florida Amendment 8
- 2010 Florida Federal Budget Advisory Question

Amendment 1 results by county Yes: 60–70%; 50–60%; No: 50–60%

Amendment 2 results by county Yes: 80–90%; 70–80%; 60–70%

Amendment 4 results by county No: 80–90%; 70–80%; 60–70%; 50–60%; Yes: 50–60%

Amendment 5 results by county Yes: 70–80%; 60–70%; 50–60%; No: 60–70%; 50–60%

Amendment 6 results by county Yes: 70–80%; 60–70%; 50–60%; No: 60–70%; 50–60%

Amendment 8 results by county Yes: 60–70%; 50–60%; No: 50–60%

Amendment 10 results by county Yes: 70–80%; 60–70%; 50–60%

== Local ==
Many elections for county offices were also held on November 2, 2010.
