= 1970 United States ballot measures =

- 1970

Part of the 1970 United States elections

This page lists state ballot measures in the United States in 1970 in the United States by state. Measures are included whether they are initiated by a state legislature or by the citizens of said state. Subheadings are included under a state if there was a measure that was held on a different date with the subheading being the date of the ballot measures. Results for each measure are included the "Results" heading and not under headings for each state with only whether they passed or not being included.

Several states notably held measures about whether to lower the voting age prior to the 26th Amendment. Measures to lower the voting age to 19 years old were held in Montana, New Jersey, and Oregon among others. States were measures were held to lower the voting age to 18 were in Alaska, Connecticut, Florida, and Hawaii.

According to Ballotpedia the first statewide referendum on abortion in the United States occurred that year in Washington state. In Massachusetts, there was a ballot measure which was in the form of an advisory question which asked voters about which course of action should be taken with the Vietnam War with 3 different answers being offered.

== Results ==
State	Origin	Measure	Yes	No
Alaska	Legislature	Amendment 1	53.96% 36,590	46.04% 31,216
Connecticut	Legislature	Question 2	78.36% 471,516	21.64% 130,178
Connecticut	Legislature	Question 3	47.79% 307,530	52.21% 336,012
Florida	Legislature	Amendment 1	39.95% 501,764	60.05% 754,282
Hawaii	Legislature	Proposition 3	49.16% 95,265	50.84% 98,502
Massachusetts	Legislature	Question 3	57.59% 903,895	42.41% 665,573
Montana	Legislature	Amendment 3	51.68% 109,227	48.32% 102,110
New Jersey	Legislature	Public Question #1	42.71% 728,731	57.29% 977,531
Oregon	Legislature	Measure 5	37.51% 202,018	62.49% 336,527
Washington	Legislature	Referendum 20	56.49% 599,959	43.51% 462,174

== Alaska ==
- Amendment 1, a legislatively-referred constitutional amendment that would have lowered the voting age to 18 years old for state and local elections. This measure passed.

== Connecticut ==
- Question 2, a legislatively-referred constitutional amendment that asked whether to lower the minimum age to hold a state office to 21 years (excluding the governor and lieutenant governor).
- Question 3, a legislatively-referred constitutional amendment that asked whether to lower the voting age to 18 years old in the state.

== Florida ==
- Amendment 1, a legislatively-referred constitutional amendment that if passed would have lowered the voting age to 18 years old or be made as electors and required that one must have residency for 6 months before being able to vote. This measure failed.

== Hawaii ==
- Proposition 3, a legislatively-referred constitutional amendment that would have lowered the voting age from 20 to 18 years old in Hawaii. This measure failed.

== Massachusetts ==
- Question 3, a legislatively-referred constitutional amendment that if passed would lower the voting age in state elections to 19 years old. This measure passed.
- Question 5, a legislatively-referred advisory question asking about the Vietnam War. There were 3 different answers to it: "win a military victory", "Withdraw on a planned schedule" or "Withdraw immediately". Of the options listed, the 2nd answer "Withdraw on a planned schedule" passed and got a majority of the vote.

== Montana ==
- Amendment 3, a legislatively-referred constitutional amendment that asked whether to lower the voting age from 21 to 19. This amendment passed.

== New Jersey ==
- Public Question #1, a legislatively referred constitutional amendment that asked whether or not to lower the voting age from 21 to 19 years old. This measure failed.

== Oregon ==
- Measure 5, a legislatively-referred constitutional amendment that would have lowered the voting age from 21 to 19 if passed. This measure failed.

== Washington ==
- Referendum 20, a legislatively-referred amendment that if passed would allow for an aborition "within the 'four lunar months after conception'". A woman who was married had to get the consent of her husband and if a female was under 18 they would need parental permission. This measure passed.
