= Kenneth Plante =

American politician (1939–2015)

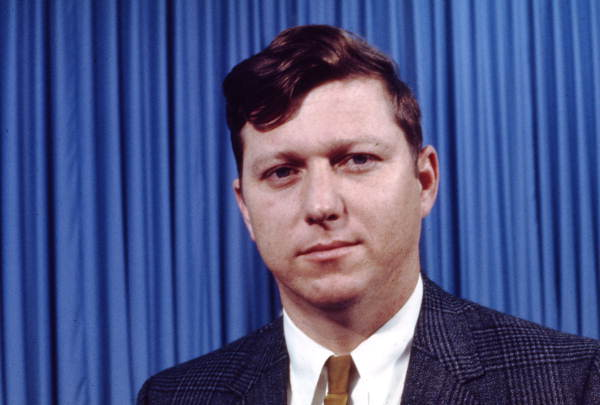

Member of the Florida Senate from the 16th district
- In office 1967–1972

Member of the Florida Senate from the 14th district
- In office 1973–1978

Personal details
- Born: December 17, 1939 Orlando, Florida, United States
- Died: March 1, 2015 (aged 75) Tallahassee, Florida, United States
- Party: Republican
- Spouse: Sandy
- Occupation: businessman

Kenneth A. Plante (December 17, 1939 – March 1, 2015) was an American politician in the state of Florida.

Plante was born in Orlando and attended the University of Florida. He was elected to the State Senate for the 16th district in 1966 and served until 1972. He was redistricted to the 14th district in 1973, and served until 1978. He is a member of the Republican party. In 2012, he was diagnosed with amyotrophic lateral sclerosis (ALS). He died of the disease in March 2015.
