= John Ryals =

American politician (1933–2017)

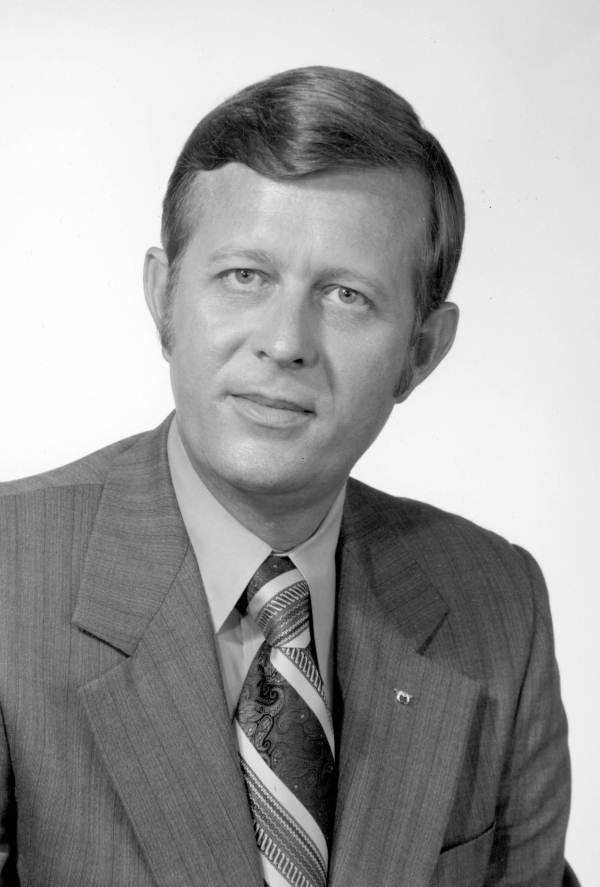
- Ryals in 1972

Member of the Florida House of Representatives from the 63rd district
- In office 1966–1980

Personal details
- Born: March 27, 1933 Plant City, Florida
- Died: July 19, 2017 (aged 84) Brandon, Florida
- Party: Democratic
- Occupation: advertising/PR, farmer

John L. Ryals (March 27, 1933 – July 19, 2017) was an American politician and attorney in the state of Florida.

Ryals was born in Plant City, Florida. He worked in the advertising and public relations industry, and was also a citrus farmer. He served in the Florida House of Representatives from 1966 to 1980, representing district 63. He was a member of the Democratic Party.
