= 1998 Florida Amendment 8 =

Amendment to the Florida constitution

- Merges cabinet offices of treasurer and comptroller into one chief financial officer; reduces cabinet membership to chief financial officer, attorney general, agriculture commissioner; secretary of state and education commissioner eliminated from elected cabinet; secretary of state duties defined by law; changes composition of state board of education from governor and cabinet to board appointed by governor; board appoints education commissioner; defines state board of administration, trustees of internal improvement trust fund, land acquisition trust fund.

Results
Choice	Votes	%
Yes	1,950,311	55.52%
No	1,562,234	44.48%
Valid votes	3,512,545	100.00%
Invalid or blank votes	0	0.00%
Total votes	3,512,545	100.00%
County results
Yes 50-60% 60-70%
No 50-60% 60-70% 70-80%

Florida Amendment 8 is an amendment to the Florida state constitution that was passed on November 3, 1998. This amendment, which had first been put forth by the Florida Constitutional Revision Commission, amended articles 2, 3, 4, 8, 9, 11, and 13 of Florida's state constitution in an attempt to restructure the cabinet.

== Background ==
Florida's executive cabinet had been created following the end of Reconstruction. The cabinet had been created to decentralize power away from Florida's governor due to a distrust of the federally appointed governors. The original cabinet consisted of six independently elected officers whose offices dealt with different fields and all had a vote equal with the Governor when it came to executive decisions. The original members of the cabinet were:

- The Attorney General
- The Commissioner of Agriculture
- The Commissioner of Education
- The Comptroller
- The Secretary of State
- The Treasurer/Insurance Commissioner/Fire Marshal

By the 1990s, as Florida developed economically and socially, and also that the original fears of federally appointed governors was no longer a factor, there began a movement to reform the state cabinet. When it met for the second time ever in 1998, the Florida Constitution Revision Commission proposed thirteen amendments that were to be approved by voters, one of which dealt with reforming the cabinet. The amendment reduced the cabinet to having only three elected members, the Attorney General, Chief Financial Officer, and Agriculture Commissioner. The Chief Financial Officer was a new office which came about by combining the offices of Treasurer/Insurance Commissioner/Fire Marshal and Comptroller. The cabinet also lost its control over the Florida Department of Education: management of K–12 education and community college education was shifted to the new Florida Board of Education and management of the State University System of Florida to the new Florida Board of Governors. Some environmental policy powers of the cabinet were shifted to other officials as well. The reforms were seen as ways to strengthen the power of the governor.
