= 2026 Florida elections =

- November 3, 2026

The 2026 Florida elections were held in the state of Florida on November 3, 2026, alongside the nationwide midterm elections. Elections were held for a U.S. Senate seat and governor as well as all 28 of the state's U.S. House of Representatives seats, most statewide offices, all 120 seats in the Florida House of Representatives, and 20 of 40 seats in the Florida Senate. Primary elections were held on August 18, 2026.

A former swing state, Florida has trended significantly towards the Republican Party since 2020. Donald Trump expanded his margin of victory in the 2020 after previously flipping it in 2016. In 2022, Republicans swept the state, winning every statewide office for the first time since Reconstruction. Additionally, Ron DeSantis won re-election in the largest landslide victory since 1982. Donald Trump defeated Kamala Harris in the state by 13.1% in 2024, flipping traditionally Democratic Miami-Dade County, which includes the city of Miami.

The strong results for Republicans surprised many observers. While the party lost nationwide (even in traditionally red states like Texas or Kansas), Florida Republicans were able to hold every statewide office and their entire House delegation (although they lost seats in the State Legislature). This has fueled speculation of a presidential run by Florida officials, particularly Governor Ron DeSantis.

== Federal ==
=== United States Senate ===
A special election was held to elect a member of the United States Senate for the remainder of Marco Rubio's term, who resigned in January 2025 following his appointment as the United States Secretary of State. Florida Attorney General Ashley Moody was appointed to the seat by Governor Ron DeSantis following Rubio's resignation and was sworn in on January 21, 2025.

Moody is running to fill the remainder of the term. She is being challenged in the Republican primary by podcaster and January 6th rioter Jake Lang.

Former United States representative Alan Grayson has filed paperwork to run for the Democratic primary. Mayor Jerry Demings, U.S. representative Jared Moskowitz, state representative Angie Nixon, and whistleblower Alex Vindman have expressed interest in running for the Democratic primary.

The August 18th primary resulted in Nixon winning the democratic primary against Vindman with 56.1% of the vote.

=== United States House of Representatives ===
All of Florida's 28 seats in the United States House of Representatives are up for election in 2026. Members of the United States House of Representatives serve two year terms.

Following the 2024 elections, Republicans control 20 seats, and Democrats control 8. The Florida Legislature is considering redistricting the state's congressional map for 2026, which would be expected to favor Republicans.

== State executive ==
=== Governor ===
Incumbent Republican governor Ron DeSantis, who was re-elected with 59.4% of the vote in 2022, is term-limited and cannot seek re-election to a third term in office.

Surfside mayor Charles Burkett, United States representative Byron Donalds, former Florida House speaker Paul Renner, and investor James Fishback are running for the Republican nomination. Lieutenant Governor Jay Collins is publicly considering a run for the Republican nomination.

Former United States representative David Jolly is running for the Democratic nomination. Mayor Jerry Demings, former United States representative Al Lawson and state representative Angie Nixon are considering runs for the Democratic nomination. Jason Pizzo was running as an independent and was endorsed by No Labels.

=== Attorney General ===
Republican attorney general Ashley Moody, who was re-elected with 60.6% of the vote in 2022, resigned on January 21, 2025, following her appointment to the United States Senate. Governor Ron DeSantis appointed Republican Chief of Staff James Uthmeier to serve the remainder of Moody's term. He is running for a full term in 2026.

Interim Punta Gorda city attorney Steven Leskovich has filed paperwork to challenge Uthmeier for the Republican nomination. Former state senator José Javier Rodríguez, who served as the Assistant Secretary of Labor for Employment and Training during the Joe Biden administration, is running for the Democratic nomination.

=== Chief Financial Officer ===
Republican CFO Jimmy Patronis, who was re-elected with 59.5% of the vote in 2022, resigned on March 31, 2025, to run in a special election for Florida's 1st congressional district. Governor Ron DeSantis appointed Republican state senator Blaise Ingoglia to serve the remainder of Patronis's term. He is running for a full term in 2026.

Businessman Frank Collige and former state senate candidate Benjamin Horbowy are challenging Ingoglia for the nomination. Republican National Committee chair and state senator Joe Gruters initially ran for the Republican nomination, but dropped out of the race in August 2025.

=== Commissioner of Agriculture ===
Incumbent Republican commissioner Wilton Simpson was first elected in 2022 with 59.3% of the vote. He is eligible to run for a second term in office.

== State legislative ==
=== State Senate ===
20 of 40 seats in the Florida Senate, specifically even numbered districts, are up for election in 2026.

=== State House of Representatives ===
All 120 seats in the Florida House of Representatives are up for election in 2026.

== Ballot measures ==
Three amendments to the constitution of Florida were proposed. Each required at least 60% of the vote in order to pass. Amendment 1 proposed raising the cap on funds that may be retained in the budget stabilization fund from 10% to 25% of net general revenue. Amendment 1 was defeated with 59% voting against. Amendment 2, which was defeated with 58% voting in favor, proposed exempting tangible personal property from property taxes for agricultural land. Amendment 3, which was successfully passed with 61% voting for adoption, proposed increasing the property tax exemption for homesteads to $250,000, and decreasing the cap on non-homestead property tax increases from 10% to 5%.
