= 1970 Florida Amendment 1 =

- November 3, 1970
- Outcome: Failed

Results
Choice	Votes	%
Yes	501,764	39.95%
No	754,282	60.05%
Valid votes	1,256,046	100.00%
Invalid or blank votes	0	0.00%
Total votes	1,256,046	100.00%

On November 3, 1970, Florida held a ballot initiative in the form of a legislatively-referred constitutional amendment about lowering the voting age to 18 years old in Florida. This measure failed to pass. As part of the amendment one had to live in Florida for a year and live in their said county for 6 months to be able to vote. It was one of many ballot measures that year pertaining to lowering the voting age prior to the 26th Amendment of the United States Constitution passing in July 1971 setting the voting age to 18 years old nationally. The amendment failed in most counties.

== Content ==
Section 2. Electors. Every citizen of the United States who is at least eighteen years of age and who has been a permanent resident for one year in the state and six months in a county, if registered as provided by law, shall be an elector of that county. Provisions may be made by law for other bona fide residents of the state who are at least eighteen years of age to vote in the election of presidential electors.

== See also ==
- 1970 United States ballot measures
