= Elections in Florida =

Elections in Florida are held on the first Tuesday after the first Monday of November in even-numbered years, as provided for in Article 6 of the Florida Constitution. For state elections, the Governor of Florida, Lieutenant Governor, and the members of the Florida Cabinet, and members of the Florida Senate are elected every four years; members of the Florida House of Representatives are elected every two years.

In a 2020 study, Florida was ranked as the 11th hardest state for citizens to vote in.

All citizens of the United States, over the age of eighteen and who are permanent residents of the state, may register to vote as a qualified elector of Florida unless they are convicted of a felony or found to be mentally incompetent.

Gubernatorial election results
Year	Democratic	Republican
1952	74.8% 624,463	25.2% 210,009
1956	73.7% 747,753	26.3% 266,980
1960	59.8% 849,407	40.1% 569,936
1964	56.1% 933,554	41.3% 686,297
1966	44.9% 668,233	55.1% 821,190
1970	56.9% 984,305	43.1% 746,243
1974	61.2% 1,118,954	38.8% 709,438
1978	55.6% 1,406,580	44.4% 1,123,888
1982	64.7% 1,739,553	35.3% 949,013
1986	45.4% 1,538,620	54.6% 1,847,525
1990	56.5% 1,995,206	43.5% 1,535,068
1994	50.8% 2,135,008	49.2% 2,071,068
1998	44.7% 1,773,054	55.3% 2,191,105
2002	43.2% 2,201,427	56.0% 2,856,845
2006	45.1% 2,178,289	52.2% 2,519,845
2010	47.7% 2,557,785	48.9% 2,619,335
2014	47.1% 2,801,198	48.1% 2,865,343
2018	49.2% 4,043,723	49.6% 4,076,186
2022	40.0% 3,105,469	59.4% 4,613,783

== State elections ==
The Governor of Florida, Lieutenant Governor, and the members of the Florida Cabinet are elected every four years. Members of the Florida House of Representatives are elected every two years, while members of the Florida Senate are elected every four years.

Candidates for the Florida legislature may serve no more than 2 consecutive terms (8 years) as Senator, or 4 consecutive terms (8 years) as Representative.

Voters determine whether judges at the state level should be retained, at the end of their respective term. Since this law was enacted in 1974, no judge has ever been removed from office by failure of retention.

== Florida in national elections ==
Florida received international attention for its role in the 2000 presidential election, where George W. Bush led Al Gore by only a couple of hundred votes when the Supreme Court of the United States ended a recount. It had also played a role in the equally contested 1876 presidential election and was seen as one of the key swing states in presidential elections until the 2024 presidential election. Today, it is considered a reliably Republican state in state and national elections.

Florida held its 2008 presidential primary on January 29, 2008, after a bill was passed in May 2007 moving it sooner on the electoral calendar. This move was in violation of party rules restricting primaries held before February 5 to Iowa, Nevada, New Hampshire, and South Carolina. The Democratic Party eventually decided to strip Florida of all its 210 delegates at the Democrats' convention, while the Republicans stripped Florida of half its delegates to the GOP convention. A federal judge dismissed a suit from Democratic Senator Bill Nelson against the DNC and chairman Howard Dean to overturn this decision.

== History ==
United States presidential election results for Florida
Year	Republican / Whig		Democratic		Third party(ies)	
Year	No.	%	No.	%	No.	%
1848	4,120	57.20%	3,083	42.80%	0	0.00%
1852	2,875	39.97%	4,318	60.03%	0	0.00%
1856	0	0.00%	6,358	56.81%	4,833	43.19%
1860	0	0.00%	223	1.68%	13,078	98.32%
1872	17,763	53.52%	15,427	46.48%	0	0.00%
1876	23,849	50.99%	22,927	49.01%	0	0.00%
1880	23,654	45.83%	27,964	54.17%	0	0.00%
1884	28,031	46.73%	31,769	52.96%	190	0.32%
1888	26,529	39.89%	39,557	59.48%	414	0.62%
1892	0	0.00%	30,153	85.01%	5,318	14.99%
1896	11,298	24.30%	32,756	70.46%	2,434	5.24%
1900	7,355	18.55%	28,273	71.31%	4,021	10.14%
1904	8,314	21.15%	27,046	68.80%	3,949	10.05%
1908	10,654	21.58%	31,104	63.01%	7,602	15.40%
1912	4,279	8.42%	35,343	69.52%	11,215	22.06%
1916	14,611	18.10%	55,984	69.34%	10,139	12.56%
1920	44,853	30.79%	90,515	62.13%	10,313	7.08%
1924	30,633	28.06%	62,083	56.88%	16,438	15.06%
1928	144,168	56.83%	101,764	40.12%	7,742	3.05%
1932	69,170	25.04%	206,307	74.68%	775	0.28%
1936	78,248	23.90%	249,117	76.08%	67	0.02%
1940	126,158	25.99%	359,334	74.01%	0	0.00%
1944	143,215	29.68%	339,377	70.32%	0	0.00%
1948	194,280	33.63%	281,988	48.82%	101,375	17.55%
1952	544,036	54.99%	444,950	44.97%	351	0.04%
1956	643,849	57.27%	480,371	42.73%	0	0.00%
1960	795,476	51.51%	748,700	48.49%	0	0.00%
1964	905,941	48.85%	948,540	51.15%	0	0.00%
1968	886,804	40.53%	676,794	30.93%	624,207	28.53%
1972	1,857,759	71.91%	718,117	27.80%	7,407	0.29%
1976	1,469,531	46.64%	1,636,000	51.93%	45,100	1.43%
1980	2,046,951	55.52%	1,419,475	38.50%	220,600	5.98%
1984	2,730,350	65.32%	1,448,816	34.66%	885	0.02%
1988	2,618,885	60.87%	1,656,701	38.51%	26,727	0.62%
1992	2,173,310	40.89%	2,072,698	39.00%	1,068,384	20.10%
1996	2,244,536	42.32%	2,546,870	48.02%	512,388	9.66%
2000	2,912,790	48.85%	2,912,253	48.84%	138,067	2.32%
2004	3,964,522	52.10%	3,583,544	47.09%	61,744	0.81%
2008	4,046,219	48.10%	4,282,367	50.91%	83,662	0.99%
2012	4,163,447	49.03%	4,237,756	49.90%	90,972	1.07%
2016	4,617,886	48.60%	4,504,975	47.41%	379,886	4.00%
2020	5,668,731	51.11%	5,297,045	47.76%	125,982	1.14%
2024	6,110,125	55.87%	4,683,038	42.82%	142,302	1.30%

In the first half of the 19th century, the right to vote was held only by white males aged 21 and over. After 1920, women were able to vote with the passing of the Nineteenth Amendment to the United States Constitution. In 1937, the requirement to pay a poll tax was repealed by the state legislature, allowing poorer Floridians to vote, and in 1944 the United States Supreme Court invalidated a system of white-only primary elections.

Florida was originally part of the Solid South, as Democrats overwhelmingly won state and federal elections during the hundred years following the Civil War. However, in 1937, the requirement to pay a poll tax was repealed by the state legislature, allowing poorer Floridians to vote, and coupled with a growing tourist industry in the mid-20th century that attracted Northern retirees, the state became electorally competitive earlier than the rest of the South. Since 1928, the state has only voted for the losing presidential candidate three times, all for losing Republicans in 1960, 1992, and 2020. In 1966, Claude Kirk was elected the first Republican governor of Florida since Reconstruction. This was followed in 1968, with Republicans winning a Senate seat in the state for the first time since Reconstruction.

The Florida Elections Commission was established in 1973. In 2005, Jeb Bush signed a bill to abolish primary runoff elections, resulting in all primary and general elections being determined by plurality rather than majority.

The state is dominated by Republicans on the state level, as Democrats have not held the governorship or either house of the legislature since 1999. Republicans currently have veto-proof majorities in both houses of the Florida legislature. However, the state has become increasingly Republican since the late 2010s, as in 2018, Republicans captured both Senate seats in the state for the first time since Reconstruction. In 2020, Florida voted 7.8 points right of the nation as a whole, the furthest it has voted from the nation since 1988, and it was the first election since 1992 that Florida backed the losing candidate. In 2022, Republicans won their largest statewide victories since Reconstruction and neared 60% of the vote. In 2021, registered Republicans surpassed Democrats for the first time in state history.

== Election security ==
On August 8, 2018 Senator Bill Nelson told the Tampa Bay Times that Florida's voting system had been penetrated by Russian hacking efforts. Senator Nelson noted that the likely target of hacking efforts was voter rolls for the state.

During DEF CON 26 in 2018, an 11-year-old reportedly hacked into a Florida state election website replica in just 10 minutes by taking advantage of expired SSL certificates. The participants of this event also discovered vulnerabilities of the state voting machines via the memory card and rendering a voter's ballot invalid.

In May 2019, Republican Florida Governor Ron DeSantis announced Russians hacked voting databases in two Florida counties prior to the 2016 presidential election and no election results were compromised.

== Party affiliation ==
The following statistics show party affiliation of registered Florida voters:

- In 1972, Democratic registered 69%, Republican 28%, and 3% other.
- In 1992, Democratic registered 51%, Republicans 41%, and 8% other.
- In 2013, Democrats registered 40%, Republicans 35%, and 25% other.
- In 2016, Democrats registered 38%, Republicans 36%, and 26% other.
- In 2018, Democrats registered 37%, Republicans 35%, and 28% other.
- In 2021, Democrats registered 35.6%, Republicans 35.9%, and 28.5% other.
- In 2026, Democrats registered 30.1%, Republicans 41.4%, and 28.5% other.

== See also ==
- 2026 Florida elections
- List of Florida ballot measures
- Politics of Florida
  - Political party strength in Florida
  - Florida Democratic Party
  - Republican Party of Florida
- Government of Florida
- United States presidential elections in Florida
- Women's suffrage in Florida
