= 2006 Florida Amendment 3 =

Referendum increasing required vote for constitutional amendments

- November 7, 2006
- Requiring Broader Public Support For Constitutional Amendments Or Revisions

Results
Choice	Votes	%
Yes	2,600,969	57.78%
No	1,900,359	42.22%
County results
Yes
70–80%
60–70%
50–60%
No
50–60%

2006 Florida Amendment 3 was a proposed amendment to the Constitution of Florida to increase the vote required for constitutional amendments from a simple majority to a 60% threshold. The ballot measure passed, receiving over 57% of the vote, and the backing of all but 2 of Florida's 67 counties. Following enactment of the amendment, 13 subsequent ballot measures have received 50–60% support, meaning they failed. These include 5 citizen initiated ballot measures and 8 legislatively referred ballot measures.

== Background ==
=== Pregnant pigs ===
In 2002, Florida voters approved Amendment 10, which prohibited confining pregnant pigs in a way which prevented them from turning around freely. While the measure had been strongly favored by the Humane Society as a way to prevent cruelty from occurring to animals, it sparked a strong backlash from the political class in Tallahassee.

=== Resolution for Amendment 3 ===
House Joint Resolution 1723 (HJR 1723) placed 2006 Florida Amendment 3 on the ballot. It was introduced on March 17, 2005, by State Rep. David Simmons. On April 26, the State House agreed to the resolution in a 86 to 30 vote, with 4 not voting, and on May 6, the State Senate agreed to it in a 37 to 3 vote, with all voting. The three opposition votes in the State Senate came from state senators Tony Hill, Les Miller, and Frederica Wilson.

== Contents ==
The measure, which was decided by voters alongside the 2006 Florida elections, had the following information shown to voters for Amendment 3:

No. 3

Constitutional Amendment

Article XI, Section 5

Requiring Broader Public Support For Constitutional Amendments Or Revisions

Proposes an amendment to Section 5 of Article XI of the State Constitution to require that any proposed amendment to or revision of the State Constitution, whether proposed by the Legislature, by initiative, or by any other method, must be approved by at least 60 percent of the voters of the state voting on the measure, rather than by a simple majority. This proposed amendment would not change the current requirement that a proposed constitutional amendment imposing a new state tax or fee be approved by at least 2/3 of the voters of the state voting in the election in which such an amendment is considered.

O Yes

O No

== Viewpoints ==
=== Support ===
State Rep. Alan Hays voted in favor of the amendment, believing that a state constitution should be a "guiding framework document that should not be changed just because of the whim of some group of people who all of a sudden they can muster up a simple majority and go with it." Hays went on to say, "I think the 60% rule is a good rule. If you’re going to change it, change it to 65%."

=== Opposition ===
State Rep. Bruce Antone voted against the amendment, and, in an interview with the Florida Phoenix in 2024, he reaffirmed his opposition, saying, "I still think it’s a bad idea. At the time, they passed that to make it more difficult because they were just trying to keep these amendments out of the Constitution, but I still think it’s a bad idea that we require 60%."

== Results ==
65 counties voted in favor, and 2 voted against. The highest level of support came from Gilchrist County, with 71.42% in favor, and the lowest came from Volusia County, with 43.96% in favor.

The following table details the results by county:

County	Yes		No	
County	#	%	#	%
Alachua	43,262	65.35	22,936	34.65
Baker	3,749	64.68	2,047	35.32
Bay	29,302	64.35	16,234	35.65
Bradford	4,222	63.08	2,471	36.92
Brevard	102,539	56.95	77,504	43.05
Broward	213,468	56.88	161,803	43.12
Calhoun	1,912	60.70	1,238	39.30
Charlotte	32,311	61.31	20,391	38.69
Citrus	28,106	56.91	21,280	43.09
Clay	32,506	65.66	17,004	34.34
Collier	50,399	61.68	31,306	38.32
Columbia	10,457	70.49	4,378	29.51
Desoto	3,695	60.51	2,411	39.49
Dixie	3,137	69.22	1,395	30.78
Duval	132,679	63.53	76,174	36.47
Escambia	54,670	68.24	25,446	31.76
Flagler	15,055	53.79	12,933	46.21
Franklin	2,318	63.49	1,333	36.51
Gadsden	7,710	57.92	5,602	42.08
Gilchrist	3,571	71.42	1,429	28.58
Glades	1,749	63.16	1,020	36.84
Gulf	2,950	64.31	1,637	35.69
Hamilton	1,993	67.13	976	32.87
Hardee	2,414	57.48	1,786	42.52
Hendry	3,646	70.65	1,515	29.35
Hernando	30,621	56.94	23,152	43.06
Highlands	16,243	57.50	12,004	42.50
Hillsborough	145,372	53.39	126,923	46.61
Holmes	3,101	64.81	1,684	35.19
Indian River	24,756	61.18	15,708	38.82
Jackson	7,541	63.58	4,320	36.42
Jefferson	3,387	60.59	2,203	39.41
Lafayette	1,429	69.44	629	30.56
Lake	48,425	58.42	34,470	41.58
Lee	89,910	61.62	56,011	38.38
Leon	48,189	57.07	36,256	42.93
Levy	7,325	69.11	3,274	30.89
Liberty	965	58.59	682	41.41
Madison	3,628	66.07	1,863	33.93
Manatee	52,236	55.16	42,455	44.84
Marion	58,215	60.81	37,511	39.19
Martin	31,627	62.92	18,638	37.08
Miami-Dade	193,350	54.72	160,026	45.28
Monroe	13,867	60.67	8,988	39.33
Nassau	13,965	65.75	7,274	34.25
Okaloosa	38,023	70.93	15,581	29.07
Okeechobee	4,882	63.78	2,772	36.22
Orange	105,643	52.26	96,508	47.74
Osceola	23,466	56.60	17,991	43.40
Palm Beach	214,767	63.36	124,181	36.64
Pasco	68,357	55.44	54,933	44.56
Pinellas	124,573	46.30	144,475	53.70
Polk	78,855	59.40	53,904	40.60
Putnam	12,263	65.30	6,516	34.70
Santa Rosa	27,940	68.33	12,949	31.67
Sarasota	73,515	54.85	60,525	45.15
Seminole	53,519	50.55	52,348	49.45
St. Johns	38,613	67.74	18,385	32.26
St. Lucie	39,577	61.24	25,046	38.76
Sumter	19,226	66.50	9,686	33.50
Suwannee	7,098	68.95	3,197	31.05
Taylor	3,360	63.67	1,917	36.33
Union	1,715	65.63	898	34.37
Volusia	63,775	43.96	81,316	56.04
Wakulla	5,416	60.41	3,550	39.59
Walton	10,368	68.49	4,769	31.51
Washington	4,046	60.95	2,592	39.05
Total	2,600,969	57.78	1,900,359	42.22

== Constitutional changes ==
The amendment changed Section 5 of Article XI of Florida's Constitution as follows: (Note: Only subsection (e) was amended. Underlined words denote language that was added.)

SECTION 5. Amendment or revision election.—

(a) A proposed amendment to or revision of this constitution, or any part of it, shall be submitted to the electors at the next general election held more than ninety days after the joint resolution or report of revision commission, constitutional convention or taxation and budget reform commission proposing it is filed with the custodian of state records, unless, pursuant to law enacted by the affirmative vote of three-fourths of the membership of each house of the legislature and limited to a single amendment or revision, it is submitted at an earlier special election held more than ninety days after such filing.

(b) A proposed amendment or revision of this constitution, or any part of it, by initiatives hall be submitted to the electors at the general election provided the initiative petition is filed with the custodian of state records no later than February 1 of the year in which the general election is held.

(c) The legislature shall provide by general law, prior to the holding of an election pursuant to this section, for the provision of a statement to the public regarding the probable financial impact of any amendment proposed by initiative pursuant to section 3.

(d) Once in the tenth week, and once in the sixth week immediately preceding the week in which the election is held, the proposed amendment or revision, with notice of the date of election at which it will be submitted to the electors, shall be published in one newspaper of general circulation in each county in which a newspaper is published.

(e) Unless otherwise specifically provided for elsewhere in this constitution, if the proposed amendment or revision is approved by vote of at least sixty percent of the electors voting on the measure, it shall be effective as an amendment to or revision of the constitution of the state on the first Tuesday after the first Monday in January following the election, or on such other date as may be specified in the amendment or revision.

== See also ==
- List of Florida ballot measures
