= Constitution of Florida =

American state constitution

Constitution of the State of Florida

Overview
- Jurisdiction: Florida
- Ratified: November 5, 1968; 57 years ago
- Chambers: Two (bicameral Florida Legislature)
- Executive: Governor of Florida
- Judiciary: Judiciary of Florida

History
- Amendments: 26

The Constitution of the State of Florida is the document that establishes and describes the powers, duties, structure, and function of the government of the U.S. state of Florida, and establishes the basic law of the state. The current constitution of Florida was ratified on November 5, 1968.

Florida has been governed by six different constitutions since acceding to the United States. Before 1838, only the Spanish Constitution of 1812 was briefly enacted in Florida. A monument commemorating La Constitución de Cádiz still stands in front of Government House in St. Augustine.

Florida's first constitution as a U.S. territory was written and implemented in 1838. On March 3, 1845, Florida was granted admission into the Union as the 27th state. The current constitution of Florida was ratified on November 5, 1968, and has been modified by initiative and referendum several times since.

== Constitution ==
=== 1838 Convention ===
One of the requirements for Florida to become a state and join the Union was that its constitution must be approved by the United States Congress. In order to fulfill that requirement, an act was passed by the Florida Territorial Council in 1838, approved by Governor Richard Keith Call, calling for the election of delegates in October 1838 to a convention to be held at St. Joseph, Florida. The delegates were to draft a constitution and bill of rights for the Territory of Florida. The Constitutional Convention convened on December 3, 1838, with Robert R. Reid presiding as president and Joshua Knowles secretary. The work of the convention was carried out by eighteen committees, whose members were familiar with that particular area of government. The Convention adjourned sine die on January 11, 1839.

A handwritten copy of the 1838 Constitution or "Form of Government for the People of Florida", signed by convention president Robert Raymond Reid and Convention secretary Joshua Knowles, resides at the State Archives of Florida. Considered "a secretary's copy" this document is the only known copy of the 1838 Constitution. The original Constitution, signed by all the delegates, has never been found. The preamble to the Constitution of 1838:

We, the People of the Territory of Florida, by our Delegates in Convention, assembled at the City of St. Joseph, on Monday the 3d day of December, A.D. 1838, and of the Independence of the United States the sixty-third year, having and claiming the right of admission into the Union, as one of the United States of America, consistent with the principles of the Federal Constitution, and by virtue of the Treaty of Amity, Settlement, and Limits between the United States of America and the King of Spain, ceding the Provinces of East and West Florida to the United States; in order to secure to ourselves and our posterity the enjoyment of all the rights of life, liberty, and property, and the pursuit of happiness, do mutually agree, each with the other, to form ourselves into a Free and Independent State, by the name of the State of Florida.

=== Ordinance of Secession and the 1861 Constitution of Florida ===
In 1860, the onrush of the American Civil War brought the election in Florida of a convention "for the purpose of taking into consideration the position of this State in the Federal Union." Pursuant to an Act of the Legislature approved November 30, 1860, Governor Madison S. Perry issued a proclamation calling an election on Saturday, December 22, 1860, for delegates to a Convention to address the issue of whether Florida had a right to withdraw from the Union. The Secession Convention met on January 3, 1861, in Tallahassee, and produced for adoption on January 10 an Ordinance of Secession and a Constitution which largely altered the existing Constitution.

Some changes related directly to Florida's secession, such as substituting "Confederate States" for "United States," removing the requirement that the governor be a citizen for the United States for ten years prior to his election, and declaring Florida to be "a sovereign and independent nation." The governor's term was changed from four years to two years starting October 1865, an election never realized due to the Confederacy's defeat. The 1861 Constitution also added several sections affecting the power of General Assembly of Florida, such as limiting the duration of sessions, allowing it to license toll bridges and pass general laws for name changes, prohibiting it from allowing married women or minors to contract or manage their estates, and prohibiting it from legitimizing bastards. The General Assembly was also allowed to tax the lands and slaves of non-residents higher than residents and create special tribunals to try offenses committed by slaves, freemen, and mulattoes. Public lands previously ceded to the United States government were deemed reclaimed by Florida but were to be used exclusively for paying the State's debts and necessary expenses, and such lands could not be granted for any other purpose. Prohibitions on certain bankers and certain previous office holders from being elected until the expiration of a year from having left their prior position were removed. The 1861 Constitution was the first Florida Constitution to contain a clause prohibiting individuals from holding two offices simultaneously with limited exceptions. No citizen of any of the States or Territories of the United States then at war with the Confederate States could be admitted to Florida citizenship, be eligible to vote or be elected, hold property, or work in the State of Florida. The articles pertaining to the militia and corporations were largely reworded. The General Assembly lost the ability to amend the Constitution, leaving a State convention as the only method of amendment. The prohibition on the General Assembly forbidding emigrants to the State from bringing their slaves with them was repealed. The article pertaining to the seat of government was removed. Other changes included removing obsolete language stemming from Florida's creation as a State and codifying legislation enacted since Florida attained statehood.

John C. McGehee of Madison County was elected president of the convention, and the convention ratified the Constitution adopted by the Confederate States of America on April 13 and adjourned sine die on April 27, 1861.

Since the convention generally approved of Governor Perry's actions it made no move to interfere with his administration. However, when Governor John Milton took office in October 1861 and reversed some policies of his predecessor, a movement was started to reconvene the convention. Convention president McGehee issued a proclamation on December 13 for the convention to meet on January 14, 1862, at Tallahassee. McGehee expressed concern over two matters: the state's finances and the powers of the governor during wartime. To remedy the latter, the members appointed an Executive Council of four men to share the executive authority because they felt that the powers of a wartime executive should not be placed in the hands of one man. The convention adjourned sine die on January 27, 1862.

=== The 1865 Florida Constitution (not approved) ===
In October 1865, delegates met to revoke the Ordinance of Secession and write a new constitution. This constitution, since it limited suffrage to white male citizens, did not meet the requirements of Congress for seating delegates from the former Confederate states, and it was scrapped in favor of the Constitution of 1868.

=== The 1868 Florida Constitution ===
The Reconstruction era constitution returned civilian control of the state after Florida became subject to the military authority of the federal government in 1867. Pursuant to an act of Congress, General John Pope, commander of the Third Military District, issued an order on April 8, 1867, dividing the 39 counties of the State into 19 districts for the election of delegates to a convention to frame a new state constitution. The new constitution had to conform with the federal constitution, including the Thirteenth and Fourteenth Amendments.

The convention met in Tallahassee on January 20, 1868. As deliberations got under way, bitterly divided factions were formed. Of the 46 elected delegates, 18 were black and at least 15 were former slaves, who were described as literate, "gentlemen", and "eloquent" by a Northern reporter who was present. According to historian Adam Wasserman, "The radical delegates were in the vast majority and backed by a large militant black electorate." The "moderates" were "a powerful organized lobby of Southern planters, Northern capitalists, and capitalists".

For two weeks, the "radical" and "moderate" factions debated. Under the leadership of future governor Harrison Reed, the "moderates" tried to give the sparsely populated white counties the same voting power as the heavily populated black counties. The "radicals", however, would not agree to such an arrangement.

Seeing no chance of victory, 19 of the "moderate" delegates decamped to nearby Monticello, Florida. The "radical" majority proceeded to craft "the initial and legitimate constitution", signed it, and then adjourned for a week to hear back from the Reconstruction military commander, General George Meade. On February 10, the 21 "moderate" delegates, with the aid of Democratic governor and ex-Confederate general David S. Walker, broke into the hall at midnight. To ensure a quorum, soldiers seized two of the "radical" delegates (who were in bed), and forced them to the hall. Between midnight and 2 AM, the "moderates" drafted a new constitution, "protected by a guard of Federal soldiers outside the hall". When the day came for the legal convention to meet again, soldiers with bayonets prevented the "radicals" from entering the hall.

The two constitutions were both submitted to General Meade; the Committee on Reconstruction subsequently adopted the "moderate" one, on Meade's recommendation. Under its terms for reapportionment, less than one-fourth of voters would be able to elect a majority of the State Senate, and less than one-third could elect a majority of the Assembly. As stated in a letter to Senator David Yulee, "Under our Constitution the Judiciary & State officers will be appointed & the apportionment will prevent a negro legislature." Freedmen's Bureau agent William J. Furman later bragged that he had prevented Florida from being "niggerized".

The constitution was adopted by the people of Florida in May 1868. It conferred the electoral franchise upon "male persons" instead of "white male persons", as in the 1865 Constitution. With its acceptance by the federal military authorities, the State of Florida was recognized as being restored to the Union, and its senators and representatives were admitted to Congress.

This constitution stated that one seat in the House of Representatives and one in the Senate were to be allocated to the Seminoles; the seats were to be filled by a member of their tribe "and in no case by a white man." However, these positions were never filled, and this provision was not carried over into subsequent constitutions.

=== The 1885 Florida Constitution ===
The Florida Constitutional Convention of 1885 produced a constitution that reversed some of the aspects of the Reconstruction era 1868 Constitution. It established a poll tax, disenfranchising many African Americans and poor whites. It also codified segregation. It established the makeup of the state government that continued until 1968.

The 1885 Legislature enacted Chapter 3577 calling for a constitutional convention in order to revise the Constitution of 1868. In May 1885, a general election for the selection of delegates was held throughout the state. The convention met in Tallahassee from June 9 to August 3, 1885. Samuel Pasco of Jefferson County presided. Pursuant to Ordinance No. 1 of the convention, the constitution was submitted to the citizens of Florida for ratification in November 1886. The 1885 Constitution was ratified by a 31,803 to 21,243 vote.

The new constitution legitimized a poll tax as a prerequisite for voting (Article VI, Section 8), thus effectively causing disfranchisement of blacks and many poor whites. By 1888, voter turnout had decreased by 27%, and additional provisions were adopted that further suppressed voter registration and turnout. This constitution mandated racial segregation in schools (Article XII, Section 12), and prohibited marriage between "a white person and a person of negro descent" (Article XVI, Section 24).

=== The 1968 Florida Constitution ===
The current Florida Constitution of 1968 was proposed on June 24 – July 3, 1968, via three joint resolutions in special sessions of the Florida Legislature. House Joint Resolution 1-2X included all revisions except for Article V, Article VI, and Article VIII. Senate Resolution 4-2X proposed the new Article VI which relates to elections and suffrage. Senate Resolution 5-2X proposed a new Article VIII which defined law regarding local government. Article V was included from the 1885 constitution as amended. Chesterfield Smith, president of the Florida Bar, was the chair of the committee which drafted the Constitution; former Governor of Florida LeRoy Collins was also on the committee.

The constitution was ratified via referendum by the electorate on November 5, 1968.

This new constitution was a necessary step toward fair apportionment of legislative districts, required by the US Supreme Court decision in Reynolds v. Sims, 1964. Many states, including Florida, had allotted a fixed number of senators per county, regardless of population, since the Republic began, so that each county had the same number of senators, regardless of population. This practice, based upon the equal representation of states in Congress, had produced a permanent majority of rural, North Florida senators, including the Pork Chop Gang, over senators from more populous, urban districts.

The 1968 Constitution eliminated the prior ban on racially integrated schools.

A Blaine Amendment banned the use of public funds to support sectarian private schools.

== Later revisions ==
The 1998 Constitutional Revision Commission proposed a rewrite of Article IV, Section 4 of the Florida Constitution that reduced the Florida Cabinet from six elected officials to three. The change became effective January 7, 2003, and the Florida Cabinet now consists of the attorney general, the chief financial officer and the commissioner of agriculture. The secretary of state and commissioner of education became appointed positions and their respective agencies became the responsibility of the governor. The revised constitution also created a new State Board of Education with seven members appointed by the governor to oversee the Department of Education. The Cabinet offices of Florida state treasurer/insurance commissioner/fire marshal and comptroller were combined into the new position of chief financial officer who serves as head of the newly created Department of Financial Services.

In 2012, a measure attempting to repeal the Blaine Amendment did not win a majority, much less the 60% approval a constitutional amendment requires.

== Constitutional Revision Commission of 1977–78 ==
A Constitutional Revision Commission was held in 1977–78 with the following delegates:

- Dempsey Barron
- Bill Birchfield
- Lew Brantley
- LeRoy Collins
- Talbot D'Alemberte, Chairman
- John Mathews Jr.
- Kenneth Plante
- Donald H. Reed Jr.
- John Ryals
- Robert Shevin
- John T. Ware

The outcome of the commission was placing, for voter consideration and approval, eight potential constitutional amendments on the Florida ballot. None of them were passed.

== Current Florida Constitution ==
Article V of the Florida Constitution, relating to the Judicial Branch, was not included in the 1968 revision. Not until 1971 in a special session did the Legislature pass Senate Joint Resolution 52-D proposing to the voters the "modern" Article V.

=== Article I: "Declaration of Rights" ===
The first article of the Florida Constitution contains the state's bill of rights which is very similar to the United States Bill of Rights except that there are more elaborations very similar to interpretations of the Bill of Rights by the United States Supreme Court, such as a clause stating that the freedom of religion cannot be used to justify immoral acts. Florida's Declaration of Rights also states that capital punishment is not unconstitutional. Search and seizure and cruel and unusual punishment protections are to be consistent with the United States Supreme Court's interpretation of those rights.

=== Article II: "General Provisions" ===
The Florida constitution provides for an executive, legislative, and judicial branch. Unlike the U.S. Constitution, it mandates a separation of powers. The Florida Supreme Court has interpreted the "separation of powers" requirement to prohibit both encroachment by any one branch on the powers held by another and delegation by any branch of its powers.

Section one denotes the official state boundaries.

Section two denotes basic rights.

Section three prescribes for separation of powers.

Section seven mandates that those living in the Everglades Protection Area, who cause water pollution, will be primarily responsible for its remediation.

Section nine mandates that English is the official language of the state.

=== Article III: "Legislature" ===
Article III requires that the Florida Legislature be a bicameral body, with an upper house of not more than 40 members elected to four-year terms, and a lower house of not more 120 members elected to two-year terms.

Sections 10 and 11 discuss special laws (those affecting portions of the state, not the entire) and prohibitions against it.

Section six discusses the "single subject requirement" limitation on laws.

Sections 20 and 21 set standards for drawing congressional and legislative districts.

=== Article IV: "Executive" ===
Article IV governs the election of the Florida governor and lieutenant governor, and of the Florida Cabinet. It currently specifies that the cabinet will consist of an attorney general, a chief financial officer, and a commissioner of agriculture with specifically defined powers, and it designates them as elected rather than appointed.

=== Article V: "Judiciary" ===
Article V establishes the Florida Supreme Court and the Florida District Courts of Appeal, as well as circuit and county courts, describes how they are to be appointed, and sets forth their jurisdiction. It has been amended a number of times since ratification of the 1968 Constitution. Most notably, the voters approved extensive amendments in 1972 to create a unified state courts system, placing all lower courts under the administrative supervision of Florida's chief justice. This change required the creation of a new Florida Office of the State Courts Administrator, which assists the chief justice. The 1972 amendments further reduced the different kinds of courts that existed in Florida from ten to four and made this system uniform throughout the state for the first time in Florida history. An amendment ratified in 1976 ended contested elections for Florida's appellate judges and made them subject to merit retention votes under a modified Missouri Plan.

=== Article VI: "Suffrage and Elections" ===
Discusses the requirements for voters and when voting rights are disqualified.

Section 4(b) places eight-year term limits on all legislative and executive office holders. (The section also places limits on Congressional officeholders; however, these provisions were ruled unconstitutional elsewhere and thus have no effect.)

=== Article VII: "Finance and Taxation" ===
Article VII specifically prohibits the levying of an income tax, except via very strict limitations.

The article further delineates the purposes for which bonds can be issued, and requires that certain bonds be approved by the voters in the affected area.

=== Article VIII: "Local Government" ===
Article VIII covers municipal and county government, and distinguishes between charter counties and non-charter counties. Two key distinctions are set forth therein:

1. Counties may enact any ordinance that is not inconsistent with general or special state law. In charter counties, a governing special law can be one passed by the county's voters, provided it is not inconsistent with general state law. In non-charter counties, a governing special law must be one passed by the state legislature.
2. Municipal ordinances override inconsistent ordinances passed by non-charter counties; for chartered counties, the charter itself will determine which ordinance governs when there is a conflict.

Section 1 of this Article also establishes the following elected county officers for terms of four years:

- Sheriff
- Tax Collector
- Property Appraiser
- Supervisor of Elections
- Clerk of Court

=== Article IX: "Education" ===
Discusses both PK-12 and college/university public education.

Though many states have laws requiring smaller classroom sizes, Section 1(a) places this as a constitutional requirement that, by 2010, the legislature will provide adequate funding so that PK-3 classes do not exceed 18 students/teacher, 4-8 classes do not exceed 22 students/teacher, and 9-12 classes do not exceed 25 students/teacher. Extracurricular classes are specifically exempt.

Section 1(b) also mandates a voluntary PK-4 program in all public schools.

Under Section 4, each county is a separate school district, though contiguous counties may combine into one school district upon voter approval.

Section 5 requires that the county school superintendent is elected by the voters unless legislation has been passed which allows the individual to be employed by the school board.

Section 7 discusses the Florida State University System and its bi-level governing structure.

The overall system is governed by a 17-member Board of Governors, of which 14 members are appointed by the governor of Florida with the consent of the Florida Senate and serve staggered seven-year terms. The remaining three members consist of the Florida commissioner of education, the chair of the advisory council of faculty senates (or the equivalent), and the president of the Florida Student Association.

In addition, each university is governed by a 13-member Board of Trustees, of which six members are appointed by the governor and five members appointed by the Board of Governors, with the consent of the Florida Senate and serve staggered five-year terms. The remaining two members consist of the chair of the university's faculty senate and the president of the university's student body.

=== Article X: "Miscellaneous" ===
Includes various provisions.

Section 4 lays out Florida's homestead exemption provision, considered one of the most protective in the nation for resident property owners. The provision exempts from forced sale (except to pay taxes, mortgages, or mechanic's lien) 160 acres of contiguous land plus all improvements (if located outside a municipality) or 1/2 acre of contiguous land plus all improvements (if located inside a municipality), regardless of the property's value, plus personal property up to US$1,000. Upon the owner's death, the exemptions extend to the surviving spouse or to the heirs.

Section 6c, resulting from the Kelo v. City of New London decision, prohibits the conveyance of property taken by eminent domain to another person or private entity without 3/5ths approval of both houses of the Florida Legislature.

This article contains sections both prohibiting lotteries (Section 7) and simultaneously allowing them (Section 15).

Section 16 discusses about the limitations on marine net fishing.

Section 20 contains the constitution prohibition against smoking in all indoor workplaces.

Section 21 contains a prohibition "[l]imiting cruel and inhumane confinement of pigs during pregnancy".

Section 22 requires parental notification prior to a minor obtaining an abortion.

Section 24 specifies the state minimum wage. Unlike the Federal and other state minimum wage laws, this section contains an annual index to adjust the wage for inflation (the wage is adjusted effective January 1 of each year).

Section 25, re-enacted as "Amendment 7," regards a patient's right to discover records related to adverse medical incidents

Section 26 required the automatic revocation of any medical license where the provider has committed three or more incidents of medical malpractice.

=== Article XI: "Amendments" ===
The method of "compilation" for the Florida Constitution is unlike that of the federal constitution. When the Florida Constitution is amended the official text of the document is edited, removing language that is no longer in force. The Division of Statutory Revision within the Office of Legislative Services is responsible for codifying new amendments and removing obsolete language.

However, the constitution usually includes history notes appended to the sections indicating when parts of it were amended, except that sections which were a part of the 1968 revision do not contain history notes prior to 1968. The section, indexes, headings, and notes are considered editorial features and not part of the Constitution per se, and thus do not convey any rights.

==== Proposing amendments ====
The Florida Constitution provides five methods for proposing amendments:

- By the Florida Legislature, with a three-fifths vote of the membership of both houses.
- By the Constitution Revision Commission, which is established and meets every 20 years (in years ending in "7", where the preceding digit is odd; the commission first met in 1977, and its next scheduled meeting is in 2037). The commission consists of 37 members: the Florida attorney general, 15 members selected by the governor of Florida (who also designates the chair), nine members selected by the speaker of the Florida House of Representatives, nine members selected by the president of the Florida Senate, and three members selected by the chief justice of the Florida Supreme Court with the advice of the other justices.
- By the Taxation and Budget Reform Commission, which is established and meets every 20 years (in years ending in "7", where the preceding digit is even; the commission first met in 2007, and its next scheduled meeting is in 2027). The commission consists of 25 members: 11 members selected by the governor, seven members selected by the speaker of the Florida House, and seven members selected by the leader of the Florida Senate; however, none of the members can be a member of the Legislature at the time of selection). In addition, the commission has four ex officio members who are members of the Legislature: two selected by the House speaker and two by the Senate president; both the speaker and president must select one of its ex officio members from the minority party.
- By a constitutional convention, which is called by the simple majority approval of a voter initiative asking for a convention.
- By voter initiative, as a proposed amendment to appear on the ballot. By law, any such amendment 1) is limited to a single subject, 2) must include a ballot title not to exceed 15 words in length, 3) must also include a ballot summary not to exceed 75 words in length, and 4) must further include a financial impact statement not to exceed 75 words in length.

==== Amendment approval ====
Except as noted below, all amendments proposed, regardless of the method of proposal, must be approved by 60 percent of the voters in a referendum held simultaneously with the next general election (that is, the next one at least 90 days after the amendment is filed with the custodian of state records) before they become a part of the Constitution. Previously, the ballot initiatives required only a simple majority (more than 50%) to be approved. A 2006 amendment raised the required threshold to a supermajority (60%).

Amendments involving the creation of "new State taxes or fees" require a two-thirds approval of the voters.

The Legislature, via a three-fourths majority, may pass a law calling for a special election date on any amendment (again, which must be 90 days after the amendment is filed with the custodian of state records).

==== Notable amendments ====
Many diverse, and sometimes controversial, amendments have been proposed to the Florida Constitution over the years. Some of these include modifications to the amendment process itself, parental notification of a minor's intent to terminate a pregnancy, minimum wage increases, and even limits on cruel and inhumane confinement of pigs during pregnancy.

===== Right to privacy =====
Article I, Section 23 of the Florida Constitution provides:

Right of privacy. — Every natural person has the right to be let alone and free from governmental intrusion into the person's private life except as otherwise provided herein. This section shall not be construed to limit the public's right of access to public records and meetings as provided by law.

This provision was proposed during the 1978 Constitutional Revision Commission by Chief Justice Overton of the Florida Supreme Court. It was put to the electorate by the commission as part of a package of provisions in a single amendment, which failed. In 1980, the Florida Legislature, believing there was significant public interest in this provision, passed a resolution placing the provision as a single amendment on the 1980 general election that was approved by voters, becoming a part of the Florida Constitution.

The provision extends to the private lives of all natural persons, including minors, but only protects them from intrusion by government, not private individuals or corporations. It affords more protection than the right to privacy under the federal constitution. Like most rights, it is not unlimited, but state courts use the "compelling state interest" standard of review which looks at whether the government has a compelling interest for any actions implicating this right. For example, while individuals may possess obscene materials in their homes, there is no right to privacy to patronize retail establishments selling such material. The Florida Supreme Court has also decided that using one's real property in violation of legitimate environmental protection laws is not protected by this provision, as there is no reasonable expectation of privacy in such use. The clause "except as otherwise provided herein" ensures that the provision does not impair law enforcement activities under Article I, Section 12 on searches and seizures, which is interpreted in parallel with the Fourth Amendment to the United States Constitution.

Case law invoking this provision is divided into two main categories: personal autonomy and disclosure of information. The provision guarantees individual the right to refuse life-saving medical treatment, food, and water—but does not give individuals a right to physician-assisted suicide. In contrast, the Florida Supreme Court has held that the state has a compelling interest in compelling applicants for the state bar association to provide mental health records and that a municipality that was self-insured for healthcare benefits could require job applicants to disclose whether they smoke at home.

===== High-speed rail amendment =====
On the November 5, 2000, general election, voters approved a citizens' initiative referendum to amend the Florida Constitution that would require the construction of a Florida high-speed corridor statewide rail system connecting all of the state's major cities. The rail system would likely run alongside the state's interstate system, and would likely be similar to those found in Japan and other locales.

However, in 2004, the amendment was removed from the constitution via another ballot referendum. Governor Jeb Bush and some other legislators pushed for the inclusion of the ballot item to remove the amendment, claiming the rail network would be too costly to build. Jeb Bush, however, claimed that he was not opposed to the eventual construction of such a system, but that it should be managed by the Florida Department of Transportation. Proponents dispute the claim that the cost would be too high and say the presented cost estimates were highly exaggerated.

In the wake of the project's cancellation, a private sector express passenger service running across much of the proposed route was proposed by the Florida East Coast Railway. This project, Brightline, began operations in early 2018.
