= Governorship of Ron DeSantis =

Tenure as the 46th Governor of Florida

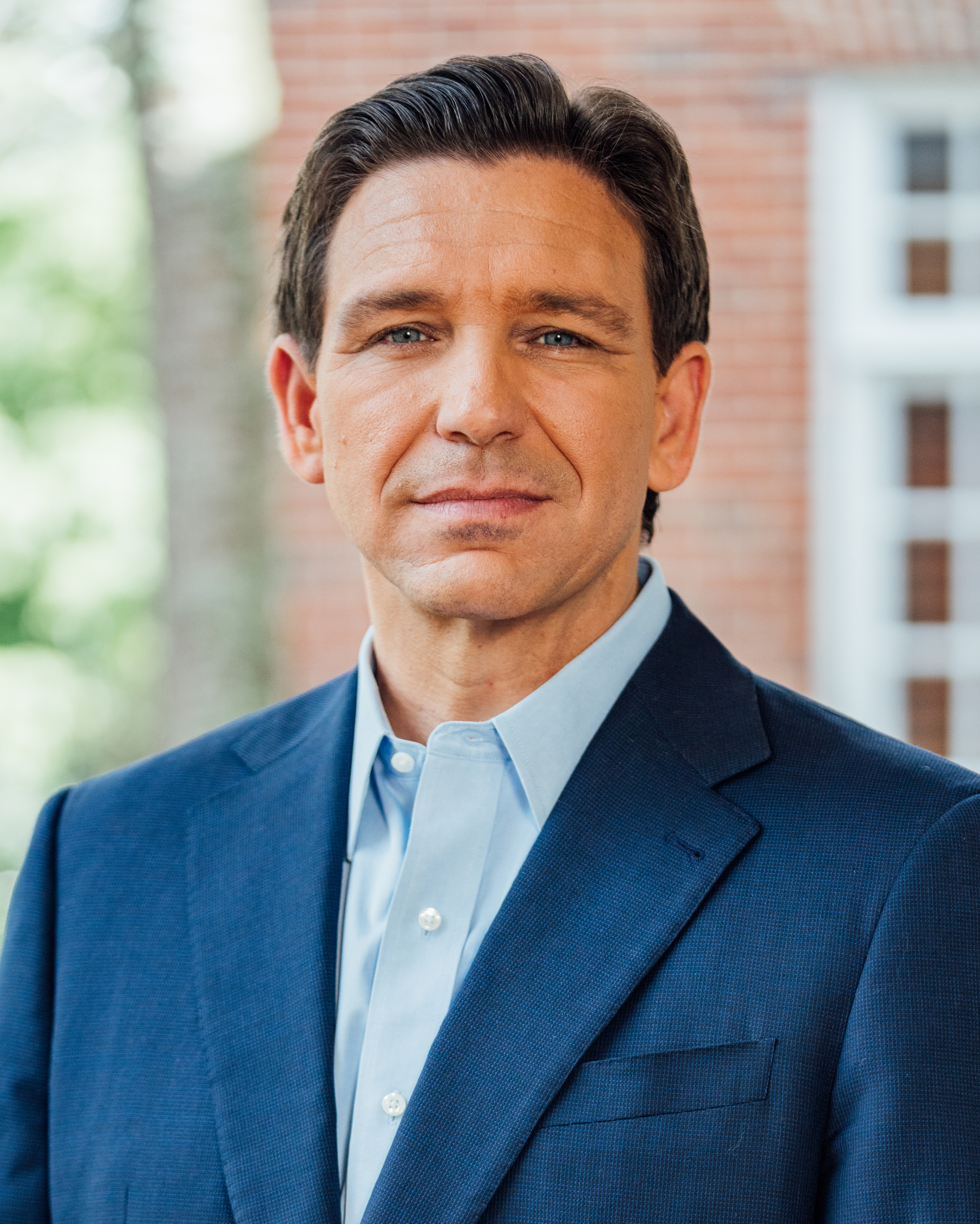
- Official portrait, 2023
- Governorship of Ron DeSantis; January 8, 2019 – present
- Party: Republican
- Election: 2018; 2022
- Seat: Florida Governor's Mansion
- Seal of Florida

Ron DeSantis is the 46th governor of Florida, having served since January 8, 2019. A member of the Republican Party, he narrowly defeated Democratic challenger Andrew Gillum in the 2018 Florida gubernatorial election. As governor, during the COVID-19 pandemic in Florida, DeSantis resisted taking certain measures that other state governments implemented, such as face-mask mandates, stay-at-home orders, and vaccination requirements. During the pandemic, Florida experienced above-average economic growth. DeSantis cut state-government spending, which, combined with high sales-tax revenue from economic growth, led to the largest budget surplus in Florida history. He engaged in recovery efforts after Hurricane Ian and Hurricane Nicole, and oversaw the passage of the controversial Parental Rights in Education Act. He was reelected in a landslide in the 2022 Florida gubernatorial election; his 19.4% margin of victory over Charlie Crist was the state's largest in 40 years. He has generally governed as a conservative.

== Electoral history ==
=== 2018 gubernatorial candidacy ===
2018 election results map by county

On January 5, 2018, DeSantis filed to run for governor of Florida to succeed term-limited Republican incumbent Rick Scott. President Trump had said the previous month that he would support DeSantis should he run for governor. During the Republican primary, DeSantis emphasized his support for Trump by running an ad in which DeSantis taught his children how to "build the wall" and say "Make America Great Again". Asked whether he could name an issue on which he disagreed with Trump, DeSantis declined. On August 28, 2018, DeSantis won the Republican primary, defeating his main opponent, Adam Putnam.

The general election was "widely seen as a toss-up". On election night, initial results had DeSantis winning, and so Gillum conceded. Gillum rescinded his concession when the margin narrowed to 0.4 percent, and an automatic machine recount began with a November 15 deadline. Although three counties missed the deadline, it was not extended. DeSantis was confirmed as the winner and Gillum conceded on November 17.

=== 2022 gubernatorial candidacy ===
2022 election results map by county

In September 2021, DeSantis announced he would run for reelection. On November 7, he filed the necessary paperwork to officially enter the race. In the general election, he faced Democratic nominee Charlie Crist, a U.S. representative and former Florida governor. Crist heavily criticized DeSantis's decision to transport illegal immigrants to Democratic states, arguing that it was human rights abuse. During an interview with Bret Baier on Fox News, Crist called DeSantis "one of the biggest threats to democracy".

DeSantis won the November 8 election in a landslide, with 59.4% of the vote to Crist's 40%; it was the largest margin of victory in a Florida gubernatorial election since 1982. Significantly, DeSantis won Miami-Dade County, which had been a Democratic stronghold since 2002, and Palm Beach County, which had not voted Republican since 1986. Crist conceded the election shortly after DeSantis was projected as the winner. At DeSantis's victory rally, supporters chanted "two more years" at various times rather than the common "four more years" to show support for DeSantis for president in 2024.

== Economy ==
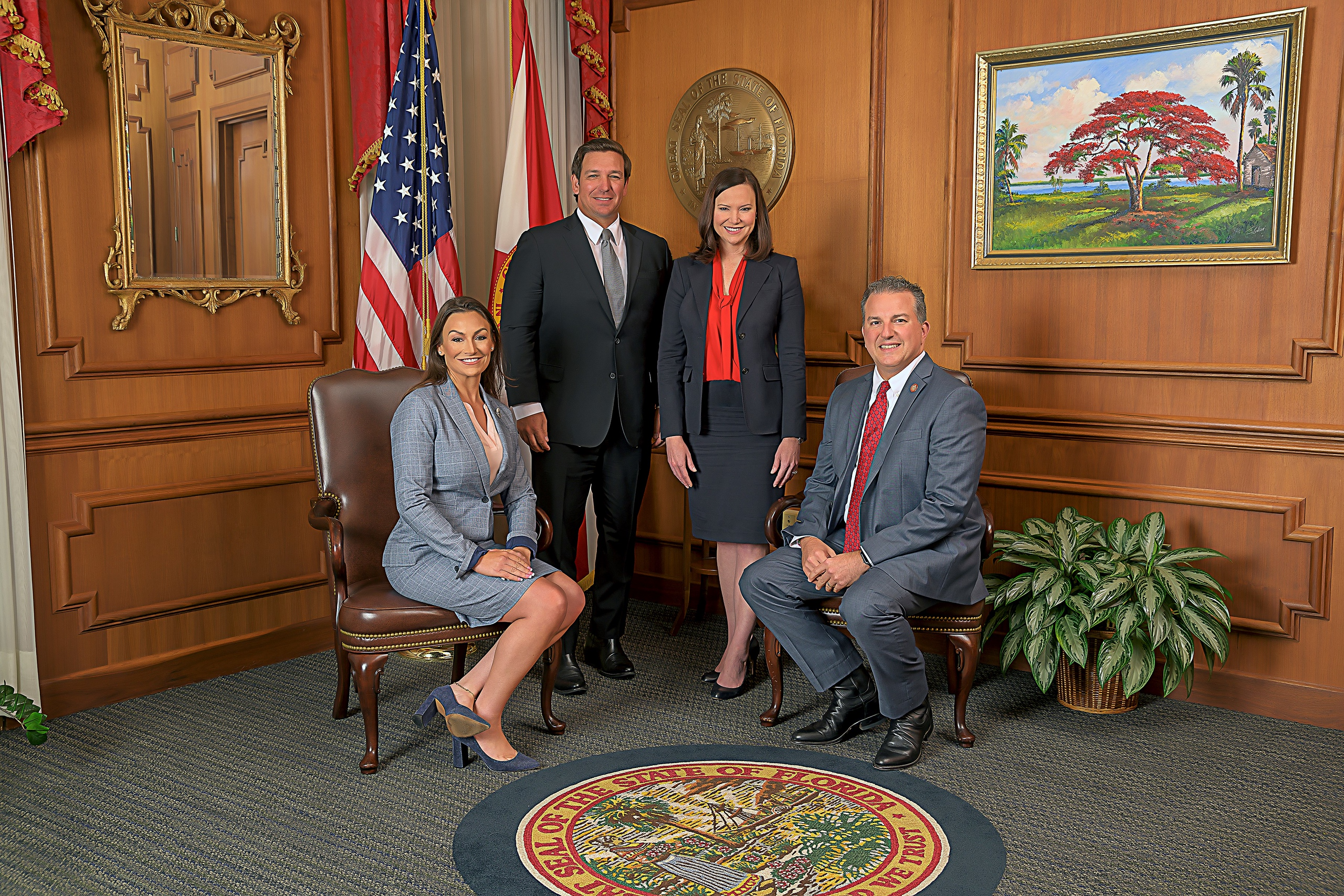
DeSantis with Florida Attorney General Ashley Moody, Chief Finance Officer Jimmy Patronis, and Agriculture Commissioner Nikki Fried in 2019

Corporate income taxes were reduced in Florida to as low as 3.5 percent in 2021, but by 2022 had returned to the 2018 level of 5.5 percent. DeSantis has maintained Florida's low-tax status during his time as governor. In June 2019, DeSantis signed a $91.1 billion budget the legislature passed the previous month, which was the largest in state history at the time, even though he cut $131 million in appropriations. In June 2021, he signed a $101.5 billion budget that included $169 million in tax relief. In its 2021 session, the Florida legislature passed DeSantis's top priorities. During his tenure, DeSantis has had a generally smooth relationship with the legislature, which enacted many of his proposals. DeSantis received a B grade in 2020 from the Cato Institute, a libertarian think tank, in their biennial fiscal policy report on America's governors.

Throughout most of 2019, Florida's unemployment rate hovered below 5 percent. During the COVID-19 lockdown in early to mid-2020, Florida, and most other states, saw unemployment rates near 15 percent. DeSantis partially blamed his gubernatorial predecessor, Rick Scott, for leaving behind a dejected unemployment system that created backlogs as COVID-19 damaged the state economy. Afterward, Florida's economy swiftly started recovering, and the unemployment rate fell below 7 percent by the latter half of 2020. In December 2020, DeSantis ordered the Florida Department of Economic Opportunity to extend unemployment waivers until February 27, 2021. Florida saw fast economic growth in 2022 and 2023, together with a record state budget surplus. Since May 2022, Florida's unemployment rate has sat around two percent, below the national average.

As a result of a significant increase in gasoline prices, on November 22, 2021, DeSantis announced that he would temporarily waive Florida's gasoline tax in the next legislative session, in 2022.

DeSantis has advocated for teenagers to work. In 2024, he extended allowed working hours for children and relaxed restrictions on construction work by 16/17 year-olds. While his office crafted further legislative proposals to remove restrictions on child labour, in March 2025 DeSantis raised that "teenagers used to work at these resorts", questioning: "What’s wrong with expecting our young people to be working part time?"

== Education ==
In January 2019, DeSantis signed an executive order calling for the end of the nationwide K-12 educational standards initiative, Common Core, in Florida. On September 14, 2021, DeSantis announced that Florida would replace the Florida Standards Assessment (FSA) test with a system of smaller tests scattered throughout the year. He said there would be three tests, in the fall, winter and spring, each smaller than the FSA. Florida commissioner of education Richard Corcoran agreed with the decision, calling it a "huge victory for the school system". The new system is to be implemented by the 2022–23 school year.

In March 2021, DeSantis proposed legislation to impose restrictions and stricter requirements for Florida universities to collaborate with Chinese academics and universities; he said this would crack down on economic espionage by China. DeSantis signed two such bills in June.

DeSantis proposed legislation to "require colleges to report any gift of $50,000 or more that is made directly or indirectly by a foreign government". The policies sought by DeSantis also would change Florida laws involving theft from cloud technology and the theft or trafficking of trade secrets by China. DeSantis signed two such bills in June 2021.

In July 2023, Florida's new education curriculum for middle schools, which included content on how "slaves developed skills which, in some instances, could be applied for their personal benefit", came under criticism. DeSantis defended the curriculum as "the most robust standards in African American history", and said of the controversial content: "I think that they're probably going to show some of the folks that eventually parlayed being a blacksmith into doing things later in life."

DeSantis sought to reshape the New College of Florida.

DeSantis is a proponent of school choice.

=== Critical race theory in schools ===
In June 2021, DeSantis led an effort to ban the teaching of critical race theory in Florida public schools (though it had not been part of Florida's public school curriculum). He described critical race theory as "teaching kids to hate their country", mirroring a similar push by conservatives nationally. The Florida Board of Education approved the ban on June 10. The Florida Education Association criticized the ban, accusing the board of trying to hide facts from students. Other critics claimed the ban was an effort to "politicize classroom education and whitewash American history".

On December 15, 2021, DeSantis announced a new bill, the Stop Wrongs to Our Kids and Employees Act ("Stop WOKE Act"), which would allow parents to sue school districts that teach critical race theory. The bill is designed to combat "woke indoctrination" in Florida businesses, schools, and public universities, by preventing instruction that could make some people feel they bear "personal responsibility" for historic wrongdoings because of their race, gender or national origin, preventing instruction that teaches that people are "inherently racist, sexist, or oppressive, whether consciously or unconsciously", and preventing instruction that teaches that groups of people are oppressed or privileged based on their race, gender or national origin. He said of the bill, "No taxpayer dollars should be used to teach our kids to hate our country or hate each other." On August 18, 2022, federal judge Mark E. Walker blocked the act in businesses, saying that it violates the First Amendment and is too vague. Walker later blocked the act in public universities for the same reasons.

== COVID-19 pandemic ==
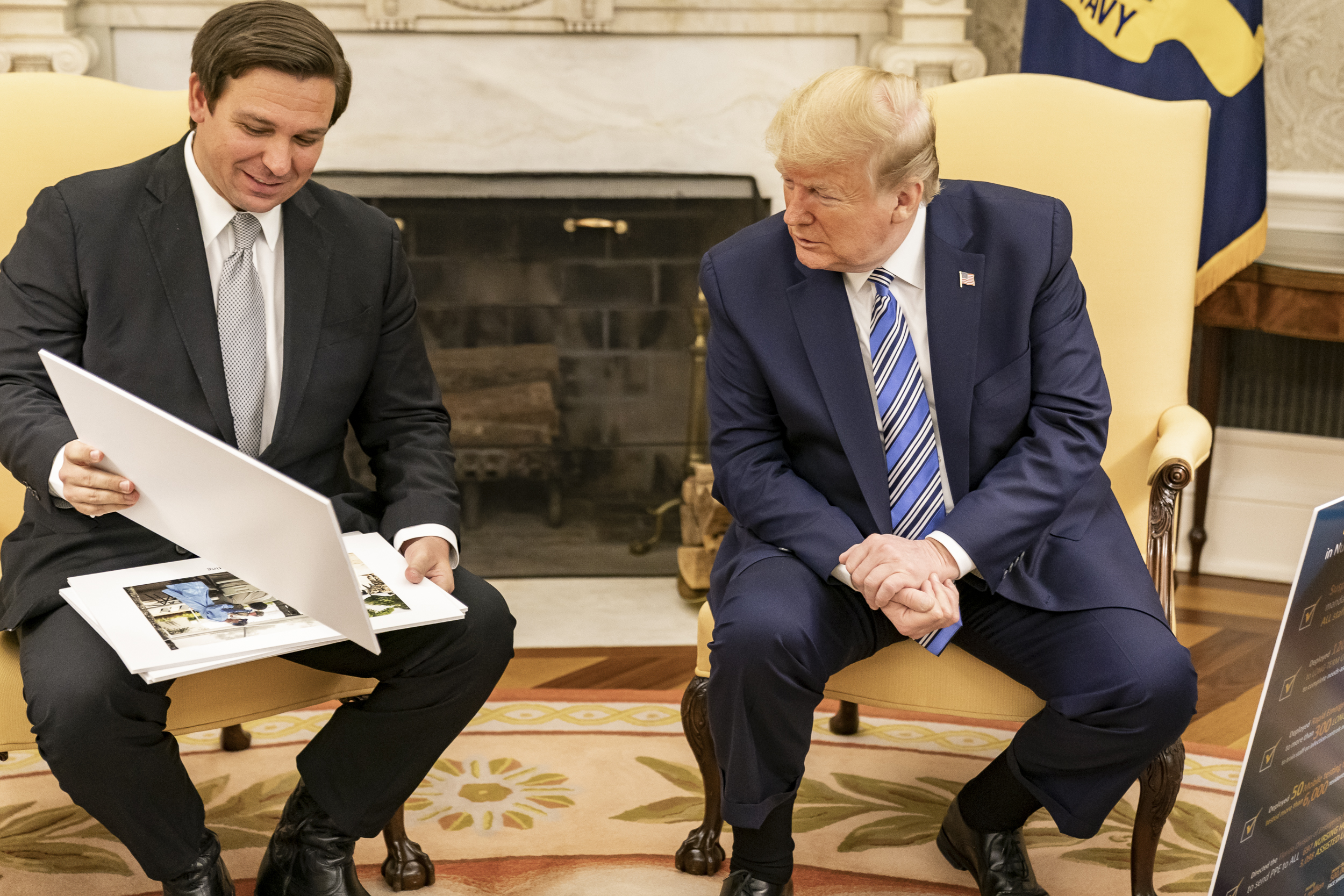
President Donald Trump and Governor DeSantis discuss COVID-19 at the White House in April 2020

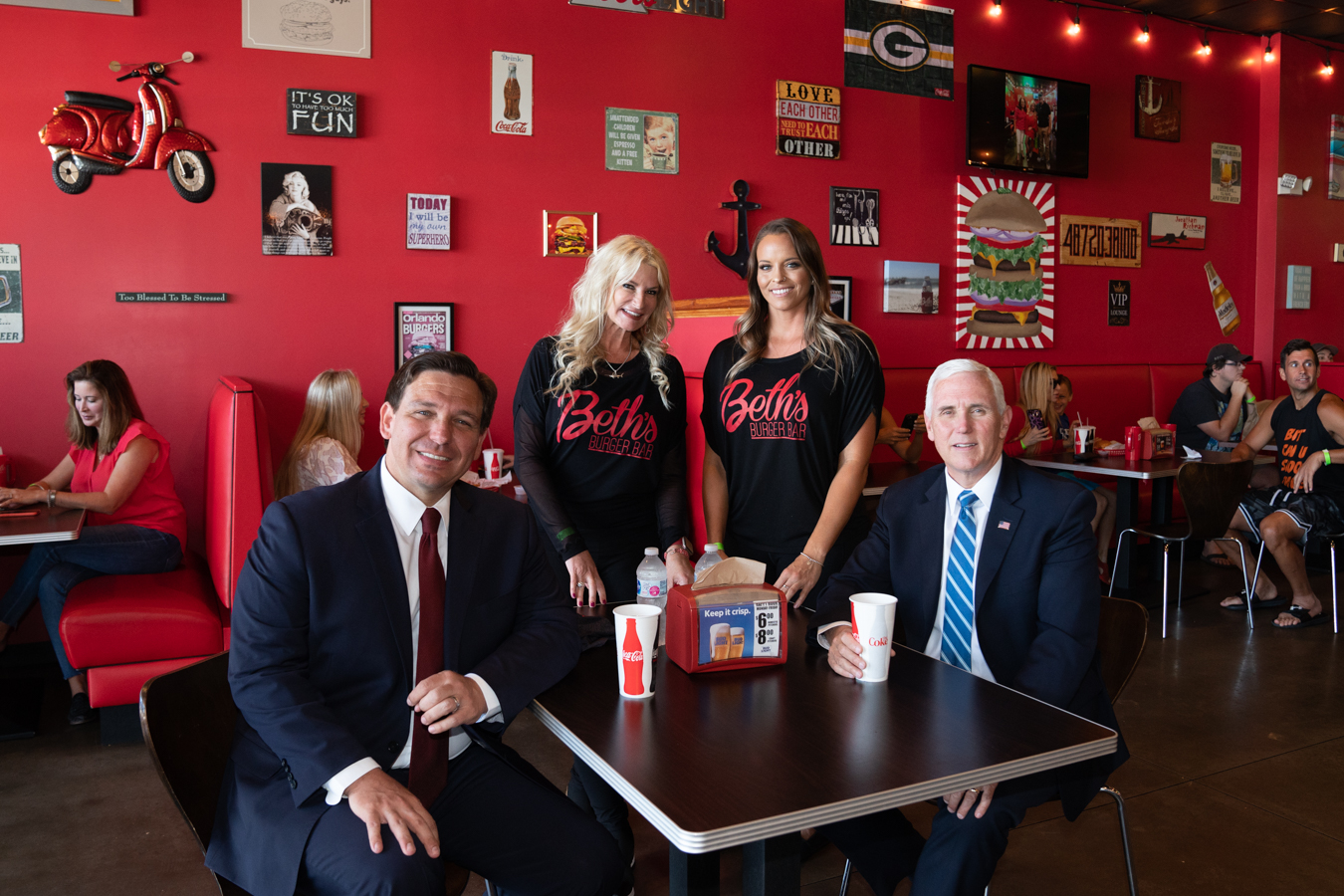
DeSantis with Vice President Mike Pence in Orlando, May 2020

During 2020 and 2021, scientists and media outlets gave mixed reviews of DeSantis's handling of the COVID-19 pandemic. From March 2020 through March 22, 2023, Florida had the 12th-highest rate of cases and deaths per 100,000 people among the 50 states, Washington, D.C., and Puerto Rico, without adjusting for the age of Florida's large and vulnerable elderly population. Florida's age-adjusted death rate, which takes its disproportionately elderly population into account, was roughly near the median among states as of 2021, and a 2022 study placed it at the nation's 12th lowest. By 2023, many political scientists acknowledged that DeSantis's management of the pandemic may have benefited him in his reelection campaign, and he was credited with turning "his coronavirus policies into a parable of American freedom".

=== 2020 ===
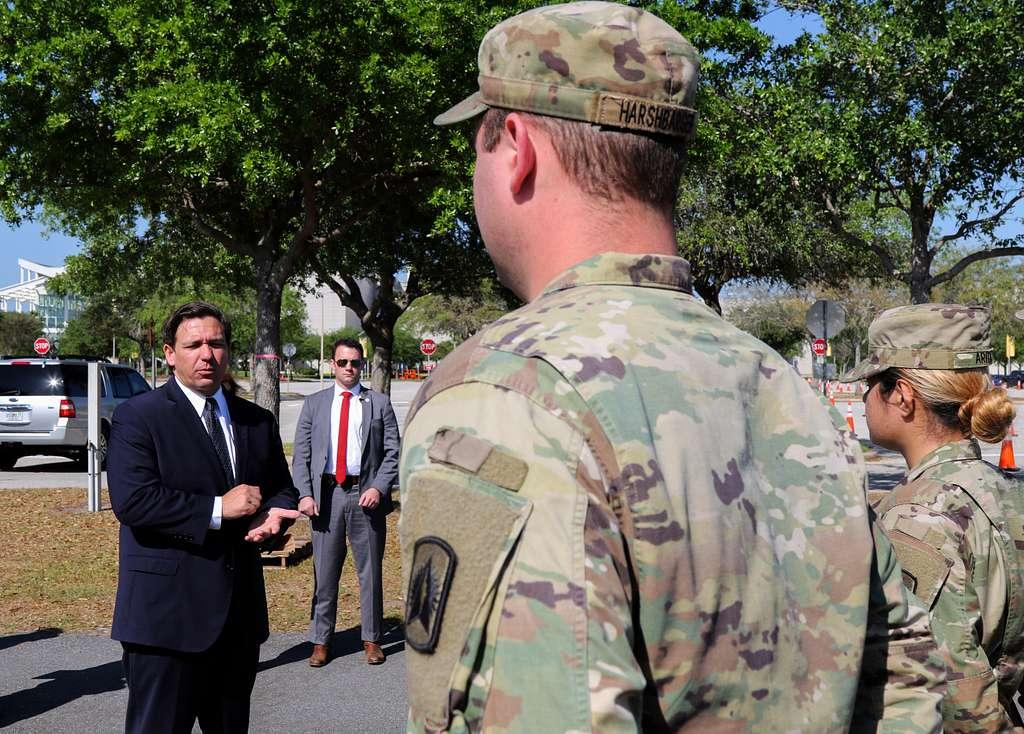
DeSantis meeting with soldiers at a COVID-19 testing site in Orange County

By March 11, 2020, the Centers for Disease Control (CDC) concluded that community spread of the pandemic had occurred within Florida. After considering the matter for a few weeks, on April 1 DeSantis issued an executive order to restrict activities within the state to those deemed essential services. By June, he had adopted a more targeted approach, declaring in mid-June:

We're not shutting down, we're gonna go forward, we're gonna continue to protect the most vulnerable...particularly when you have a virus that disproportionately impacts one segment of society, to suppress a lot of working-age people at this point I don't think would likely be very effective.

That approach was similar to the one recommended a few months later in the Great Barrington Declaration. DeSantis got vaccinated for COVID-19, and expressed enthusiasm for people getting vaccinated, but has opposed requiring it.

In early June, DeSantis partially lifted his stay-at-home order, lifting restrictions on bars and cinemas; the same day he lifted the restrictions, Florida recorded the largest case surge in six weeks. DeSantis rejected the implementation of a statewide face mask mandate, and let his stay-at-home order implemented in April expire. He announced that he would reinstate some restrictions on business activity in late June to halt the virus's spread, but said Florida is "not going back" on reopening the economy, arguing that "people going to a business is not what's driving" the surge in cases. On September 25, Florida lifted all remaining capacity restrictions on businesses, while also prohibiting local governments from enforcing public health orders with fines, or restricting restaurants to less than 50 percent capacity. DeSantis urged public health officials in Florida cities to focus less on universal COVID-19 testing and more on testing people experiencing symptoms.

DeSantis favored reopening schools for in-person learning for the 2020–21 school year. By October, he announced all 67 public school districts were open for in-person learning.

According to the CDC, life expectancy during 2020 dropped in Florida to 77.5 years from 79 years in 2019; that fall of 1.5 years in Florida was less than the nationwide fall of 1.8 years. Both the statewide and nationwide falls in life expectancy were "mostly due to the COVID-19 pandemic and increases in unintentional injuries", with the unintentional deaths mostly attributed to drug overdoses.

=== 2021 ===
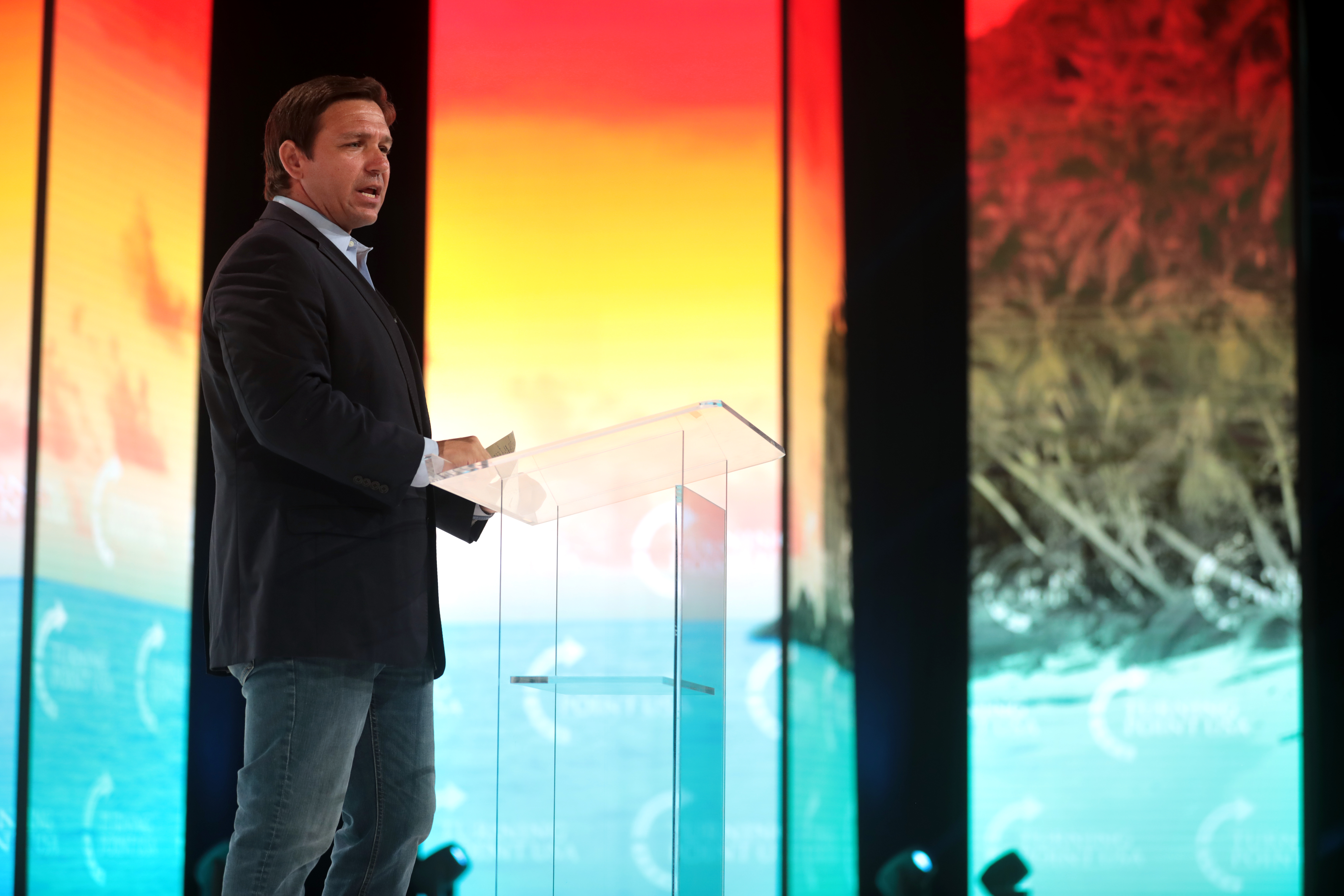
DeSantis in Tampa speaking to students in July 2021

By February 2021, DeSantis had generally positive approval ratings, ranging from 51 to 64 percent. That same month, the Biden administration mulled imposing travel restrictions on Florida and other domestic locations to prevent further spread of COVID-19, and DeSantis pledged to oppose any effort "to shut FL's border". In March 2021, Politico called DeSantis the nation's most "politically ascendant" governor, as his controversial policies had been at that point "short of or even the opposite of ruinous", while Florida had "fared no worse, and in some ways better, than many other states".

DeSantis's initial rollout of vaccines in early 2021 gave rise to various complaints about favoritism toward campaign contributors and discrimination against communities that were predominantly Democratic, poor, or inhabited by ethnic and racial minorities. DeSantis denied the alleged favoritism, defended his handling of the rollout, and pointed toward many vaccines distributed in underserved communities.

By April 2021, Florida was 27th out of 50 in both cases and deaths per capita. In May 2021, DeSantis rescinded the state of emergency and all COVID-19-related public health orders, statewide. The same day, he signed a bill into law that prohibited businesses, cruise ships, schools, and government entities from requiring proof of vaccination for use of services. Amid a July resurgence in new infections, DeSantis banned public schools from implementing mask mandates and thus left mask-wearing up to the students' parents, though he advised them against it because "it's terribly uncomfortable for [children] to do it; there's not very much science behind it." Later in 2021, his executive order about masking was superseded by a new state statute that he signed accomplishing the same thing.

By August 2021, amid a record in new cases within the state, Florida had become the state with the highest per capita hospitalizations for COVID-19. DeSantis disputed President Joe Biden's assertion that Florida was not doing enough to combat the pandemic. He also argued that Biden was allowing COVID transmission across the southern U.S. border. The Washington Post reported that this claim was based on "guesswork and assumptions, not evidence", while PolitiFact reported that COVID-19 hot spots tend to be clustered far from the border, in places with low rates of public vaccination, not along the southern border, as would be expected if migrants were driving the surge in cases.

DeSantis continued to take COVID-related actions during the rest of 2021, including penalizing local government vaccine mandates, appointing like-minded physician Joseph Ladapo as Florida's surgeon general, and recruiting out-of-state police officers to relocate and work in Florida, including officers who sought to avoid vaccine requirements in their home states. Ladapo, a signer of the Great Barrington Declaration, had a history of promoting unproven treatments for COVID-19, opposing COVID-19 vaccine requirements, and questioning the safety of COVID-19 vaccines.

In November 2021, DeSantis signed into law a legislative package that made Florida the first state to impose fines on businesses and hospitals that require COVID-19 vaccination without exemptions or alternatives.

=== 2022 and 2023 ===
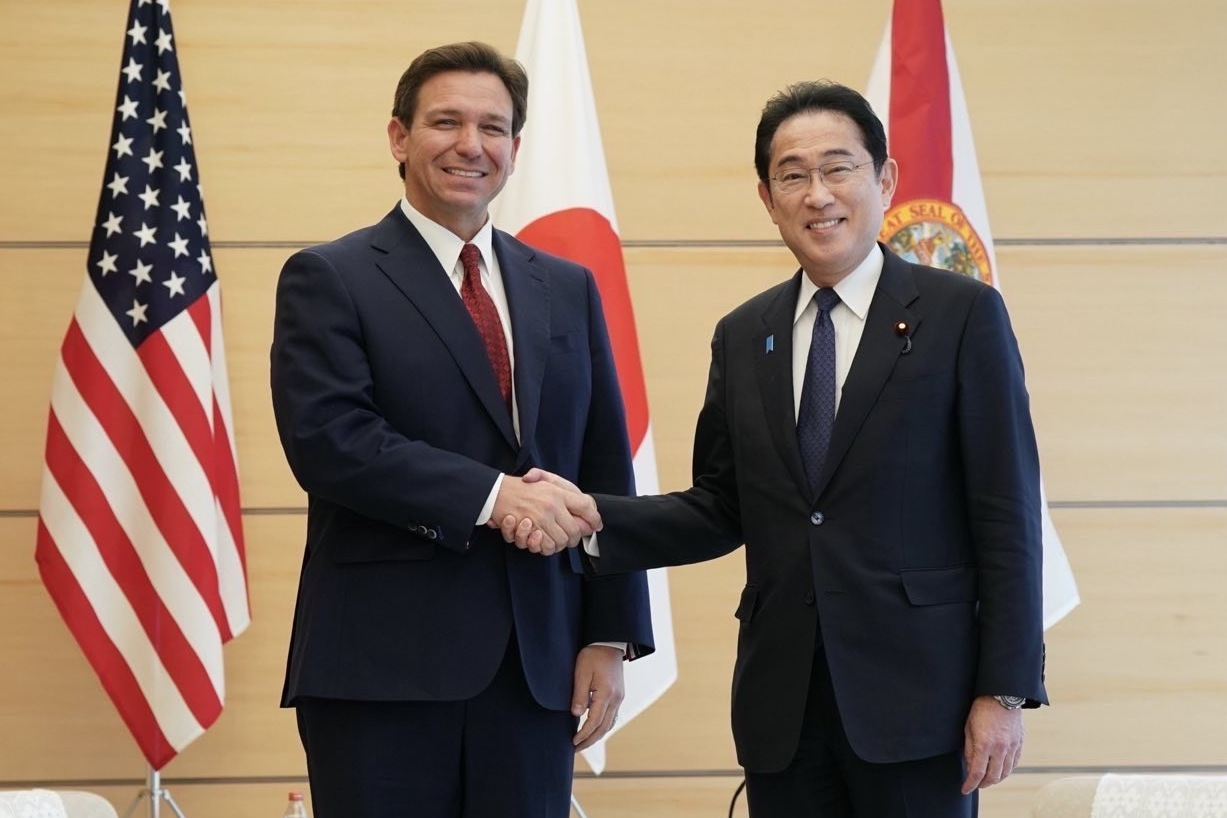
DeSantis meeting with Japanese Prime Minister Fumio Kishida in 2023

In June 2022, DeSantis decided against ordering COVID-19 vaccines for children under 5, making Florida the only state not to preorder vaccines for that demographic.

In January 2023, DeSantis announced a proposal to permanently ban COVID-19 mandates in Florida. The proposal includes a permanent ban of mask requirements throughout the state, vaccine and mask requirements in schools, COVID-19 passports in the state, and employers hiring or firing based on COVID-19 vaccines.

== LGBT issues ==
On June 1, 2021, DeSantis signed the Fairness in Women's Sports Act (SB 1028). It bans transgender girls and women from participating and competing in middle-school and high-school girls' and college women's sports competitions in Florida. The law took effect on July 1.

In February 2022, DeSantis voiced his support for the Florida Parental Rights in Education Act (HB1557), commonly known as the "Don't Say Gay" law, which would prohibit discussion of sexual orientation or gender identity in school classrooms from kindergarten to grade 3. He said it was "entirely inappropriate" for teachers and school administrators to talk to students about their gender identity. DeSantis signed the bill into law on March 28, 2022, and it took effect on July 1. This statute also includes a provision "requiring school district personnel to encourage a student to discuss issues relating to his or her well-being with his or her parent or to facilitate discussion of the issue with the parent", and does not limit such issues to sexual orientation or gender identity. As of March 2023, DeSantis was considering further similar legislation for all grades. On April 19, the state board of education extended the act's restrictions on classroom instruction to grades 4–12, unless the instruction is required by existing state standards or is part of an elective course on reproductive health.

The Walt Disney Company, owner of Walt Disney World (through Disney Experiences) in Florida, called for the law's repeal, beginning a dispute between Disney and the state government. In April 2022, DeSantis signed a bill eliminating the company's special independent district and replacing its Disney-appointed board of overseers with members he selected. He also threatened during a press conference to build a new state prison near the Disney World complex. On April 26, 2023, Disney sued DeSantis and several others, accusing them of retaliating against protected speech. During an interview with CNBC in early August, DeSantis advised Disney to withdraw their litigation because "We've basically moved on...and they're going to lose that lawsuit."

In April 2023, the Bud Light beer company began a sponsorship with a transgender person, resulting in the 2023 Bud Light boycott. With Florida's pension fund holding over 680,000 shares in Bud Light's parent company, AB InBev, in July 2023 DeSantis called for Florida's pension fund agency to investigate AB InBev for breaching duties to shareholders, as "there's got to be penalties when you put business aside to focus on your social agenda at the expense of hardworking people".

== Immigration ==
In June 2019, he signed an anti-"sanctuary city" bill into law. Florida had no sanctuary cities before the law's enactment, and immigration advocates called the bill politically motivated.

Florida became the 12th state to adopt legislation requiring local governments to aid federal immigration-enforcement efforts. In June 2020, DeSantis signed a bill requiring government employers and private companies that contract with the government to use E-Verify. He had originally called for all employers to be required to use it. A few years later, he signed into law an expansion of E-Verify and other immigration laws.

In 2021, DeSantis halted cooperation with the Biden administration's program to relocate and resettle migrants in Florida in the wake of a surge in illegal immigration. DeSantis's administration also allocated $12 million for relocating migrants to other states.

In September 2022, after similar actions by Texas Governor Greg Abbott, an agent of DeSantis recruited 50 newly arrived asylum seekers, mostly from Venezuela, in San Antonio, Texas, and flew them via two chartered planes to the Crestview, Florida airport, where they did not debark, then proceeded to Martha's Vineyard, Massachusetts. The migrants filed a class-action suit against DeSantis, calling his treatment of them "extreme and outrageous, and utterly intolerable in a civilized community".

In May 2023, DeSantis announced plans to send over a thousand personnel to Texas, including National Guard troops. Their mission will be to help Texas stem the influx of illegal immigration across the southern border.

== Response to Hurricane Ian ==
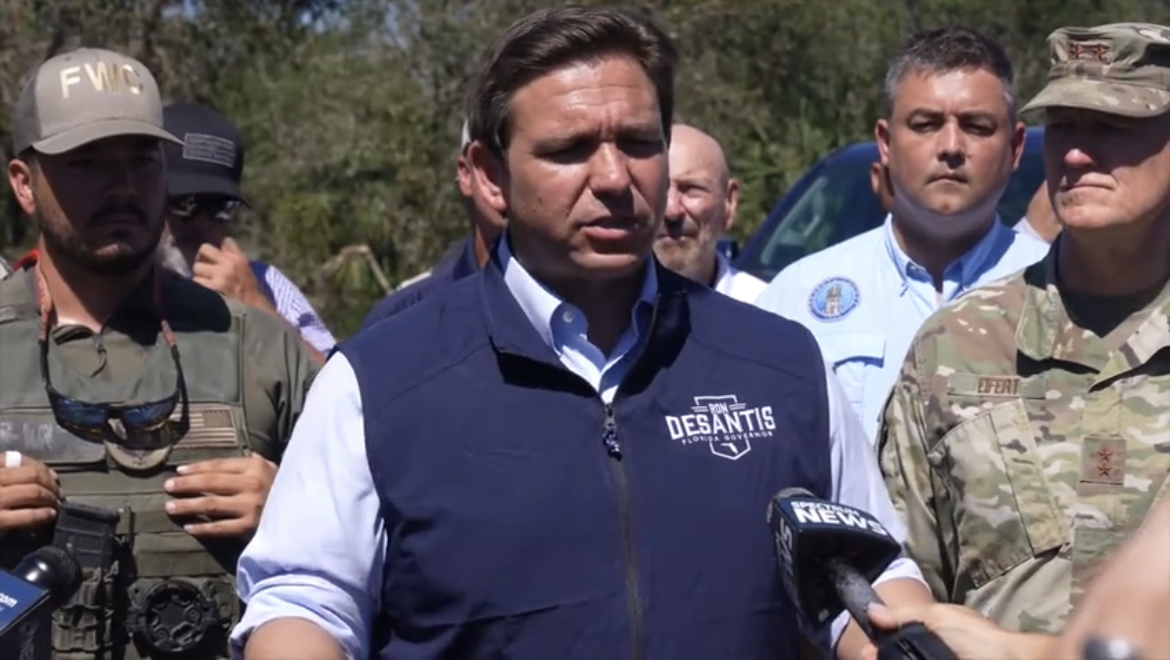
Florida Governor Ron DeSantis holds a press conference while touring the damage in North Port, Sarasota County on October 2, 2022

DeSantis was widely praised for the state's response to Hurricane Ian — the deadliest hurricane to hit Florida in over 85 years. In September 2022, DeSantis declared a state of emergency for all of Florida as Ian approached and asked for federal aid ahead of time. On October 5, after Ian deserted Florida, President Biden arrived in Florida and met with DeSantis and Senators Marco Rubio and Rick Scott. DeSantis and Biden held a press conference in Fort Myers to report on the status of the cleanup. During the press conference, President Biden said DeSantis had "done a good job" in response to the hurricane. DeSantis partnered with Elon Musk, CEO of SpaceX and Tesla, Inc., to use the Starlink satellite Internet service to help restore communication across the state.

First lady Casey DeSantis partnered with State Disaster Recovery Mental Health Coordinator Sara Newhouse and the Department of Health and Department of Children and Families to deploy free mental health resources to communities Ian affected.

== Florida Supreme Court nominations ==
DeSantis began his first term as governor with three vacant seats on the Florida Supreme Court due to Justices R. Fred Lewis, Barbara Pariente, and Peggy Quince having reached the mandatory retirement age. On January 9, 2019, DeSantis appointed Barbara Lagoa to fill the seat vacated by Justice Lewis, on January 14 he appointed Robert J. Luck to fill Pariente's seat, and on January 22 he appointed Carlos G. Muñiz to fill Quince's seat. These three appointments were considered to have shifted the court to a more originalist judicial philosophy.

In late 2019, President Donald Trump nominated Justices Lagoa and Luck to the United States Court of Appeals for the Eleventh Circuit, thus creating two more vacancies for DeSantis to fill. On May 26, 2020, he nominated John D. Couriel and Renatha Francis to fill the respective seats; Couriel took office on June 1, but the court found that Francis was ineligible to serve as she had not been a member of The Florida Bar for at least ten years. On September 14, 2020, DeSantis instead appointed Jamie Grosshans to fill Luck's seat; she took office the same day.

On April 29, 2022, incumbent Justice C. Alan Lawson announced his intent to retire, effective August 31. In his place, on August 5, DeSantis appointed Renatha Francis again after she had reached her 10-year mark on the Florida Bar. She took office on September 1 as the court's first Jamaican-American justice.

On March 20, 2023, incumbent Justice Ricky Polston announced his resignation, effective March 31. DeSantis subsequently appointed Meredith Sasso on May 23, and she took office two days later.

On January 14, 2026, DeSantis appointed Adam Tanenbaum to replace retiring Justice Charles Canady. Following him joining the court, six of the seven justices on the court are DeSantis appointees.

== Abortion ==
Following the U.S. Supreme Court decision Dobbs v. Jackson Women's Health Organization, which overturned Roe v. Wade, DeSantis pledged to "expand pro-life protections". On April 14, 2022, he signed into law a bill that regulates elective abortions after 15 weeks of pregnancy; under the previous law, the limit had been 24 weeks. The law includes exceptions for abortions beyond 15 weeks if it is necessary to avert "serious risk" to the pregnant woman's physical health or if there is a "fatal fetal abnormality", but does not make exceptions for rape, human trafficking, incest, or mental health.

The law was expected to go into effect on July 1, but a state judge blocked its enforcement, ruling that the Florida Constitution guarantees a right to privacy that renders the law unconstitutional. After DeSantis appealed the ruling, the law went into effect on July 5, pending judicial review. In January 2023, the Supreme Court of Florida agreed to hear a legal challenge to the law.

In March 2023, DeSantis said in a press conference of SB300, which regulates abortions after six weeks with exceptions to 15 weeks for rape and incest: "I think those exceptions are sensible. We welcome pro-life legislation." Floridian physicians have expressed concern about the bill; most major medical societies such as AMA, ACOG, and AAP consider abortion essential and life-saving health care, but SB300 will make providing abortion punishable by up to five years in prison. DeSantis signed the bill into law on April 14, 2023.

== Gun law ==
After the 2018 Parkland high school shooting, DeSantis expressed support for hiring retired law enforcement officers and military veterans as armed guards for schools. He disagreed with legislation Governor Rick Scott signed that banned bump stocks, added a mandatory three-day waiting period for gun purchases, and raised the legal age for purchases from 18 to 21. He has expressed support for measures to improve federal background checks for purchasing firearms and has said that there is a need to intervene with those who exhibit warning signs of committing violence instead of waiting until a crime has been committed.

In November 2020, DeSantis proposed an "anti-mob" extension to the preexisting stand-your-ground law in Florida that would allow gun-owning residents to use deadly force on people they believe are looting. It would also make blocking traffic during a protest a third-degree felony and impose criminal penalties for partaking in "violent or disorderly assemblies".

On April 3, 2023, DeSantis signed HB 543 into law, which allows Florida residents to carry concealed handguns without a permit. The law went into effect on July 1, 2023.

== Law enforcement ==
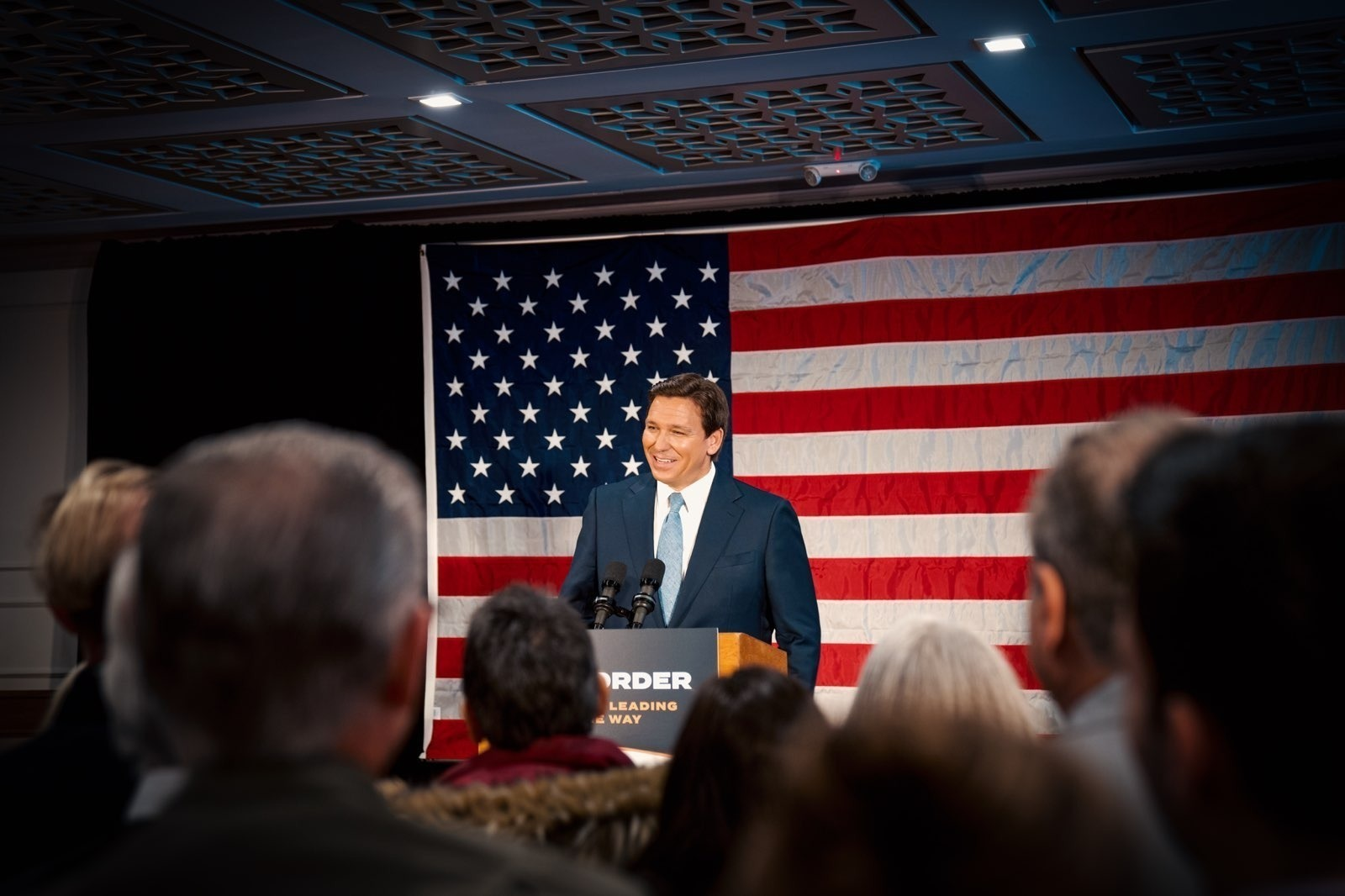
DeSantis at a pro-law enforcement rally in Staten Island.

DeSantis opposes efforts to defund the police, and as governor has introduced initiatives to "fund the police". In September 2021, he introduced a $5,000 signing bonus for Florida police officers in a bid to attract out-of-state police recruits.

In April 2021, DeSantis signed into law the Combating Public Disorder Act he had been advocating. Aside from being an anti-riot statute, it forbade intimidation by mobs; penalized damage to historic properties or memorials, such as downtown Miami's Christopher Columbus statue, which was damaged in 2020; and forbade publishing personal identifying information online with intent to harm. DeSantis had argued for this legislation by citing the George Floyd protests of 2020 and the 2021 United States Capitol attack, although only the former was mentioned at the signing ceremony. Several months after the signing, a federal judge blocked the portion of the law that introduced a new definition of "riot", calling it too vague.

On May 5, 2021, DeSantis announced that all Florida police officers, firefighters, and paramedics would receive a $1,000 bonus.

On December 2, 2021, DeSantis announced that as part of a $100 million funding proposal for the Florida National Guard, $3.5 million would be allocated to the reactivation of the Florida State Guard, a volunteer state defense force that had been inactive since 1947.

== Environment ==
DeSantis has called himself a "Teddy Roosevelt conservationist". During his 2018 gubernatorial run, he said that he did not deny climate change's existence, but did not want to be labeled a "climate change believer", adding, "I think we contribute to changes in the environment, but I'm not in the pews of the global warming left."

DeSantis signed an executive order in 2019 that included a variety of components relating to the environment. These included a promise to spend $2.5 billion over four years on restoring the Everglades and "other water protection", and the creation of a Blue-Green Algae Task Force, an Office of Environmental Accountability and Transparency, and a chief science officer. He also replaced the entire South Florida Water Management District board.

On July 10, 2020, DeSantis announced that Florida would spend $8.6 million out of $166 million received by the state from a legal settlement between Volkswagen and the United States Department of Justice relating to emission violations to add 34 charging stations for electric cars. The stations would be along Interstates 4, 75, 95, 275 and 295. On June 16, 2021, DeSantis signed into law House Bill 839, which bans local governments in Florida from requiring gas stations to add electric car charging stations.

On June 21, 2021, DeSantis signed into law House Bill 919, which prohibits local governments from placing bans or restrictions on any source of electricity. Several sizable cities in Florida at that time (Orlando, St. Petersburg, Tallahassee, Dunedin, Largo, Satellite Beach, Gainesville, Sarasota, Safety Harbor and Miami Beach) were setting goals to get all their energy from renewable sources. The bill was described as similar to those in other states (Texas, Tennessee, Louisiana, Arizona and Oklahoma) that passed laws preventing cities from banning natural gas hookups. DeSantis also signed a bill incentivizing wildlife corridors.

== Voting rights and elections ==
DeSantis expressed support for the Voting Rights Restoration for Felons Initiative after it passed in November 2018, saying he was "obligated to faithfully implement [it] as it is defined" when he became governor. In April 2019, DeSantis directed Florida's elections chief to expand the availability of Spanish-language ballots and Spanish assistance for voters. In a statement, DeSantis said, "It is critically important that Spanish-speaking Floridians are able to exercise their right to vote without any language barriers."

In June 2019, DeSantis signed a measure that would make it harder to launch successful ballot initiatives. DeSantis instructed Florida Attorney General Ashley Moody to investigate whether Michael Bloomberg had criminally offered incentives for felons to vote by assisting in a fundraising effort to pay off their financial obligations so they could vote in the 2020 presidential election in Florida. No wrongdoing was found.

In February 2021, DeSantis announced his support for several election law restrictions. He called for eliminating ballot drop boxes and limiting voting by mail by requiring that voters re-register every year to vote by mail and that signatures on mail-in ballots "match the most recent signature on file" (rather than any of the voter's signatures in the Florida system). On September 2, 2023, a state judge ruled a district map submitted by DeSantis to the Florida legislature, unconstitutional for diminishing the ability of Black voters to elect the candidate of their choice.

== Technology companies ==
On February 2, 2021, DeSantis announced support for legislation to crack down on Big Tech and prevent alleged political censorship.

In response to social media networks removing Trump from their platforms, DeSantis and other Florida Republicans pushed legislation in the Florida legislature to prohibit technology companies from de-platforming political candidates. A federal judge blocked the law by preliminary injunction the day before it was to take effect, on the grounds that it violated the First Amendment and federal law. When Twitter suspended DeSantis administration critic Rebekah Jones' account for violating rules against spam and platform manipulation, DeSantis's office applauded the decision, calling it "long overdue".

DeSantis supported Elon Musk's acquisition of Twitter, believing it could offer a more supportive environment for conservative ideas.

== Capital punishment ==
Execution by year
2019	2
2020	0
2021	0
2022	0
2023	6
2024	1
2025	19
2026	20
Total	48

As governor, DeSantis has overseen the executions of multiple inmates, all of them convicted murderers. In 2022, DeSantis criticized the life sentence jurors imposed on the Parkland high school shooter, as opposed to the death penalty. In that case, nine jurors supported a death sentence, but three blocked it. In April 2023, DeSantis signed a law (Senate Bill 450) that allows juries to impose a death sentence if at least eight of the 12 jurors agree.

In May 2023, DeSantis signed a law allowing those convicted of raping a child under 12 years old to receive the death penalty, defying and setting up a "challenge" to the Supreme Court decision Kennedy v. Louisiana.

On July 15, 2025, Florida saw its eighth execution in 2025 and tied with the previous record reached in 1984 and in 2014. On July 31, 2025, Edward Zakrzewski became the ninth person executed in 2025 and the execution broke Florida's record of most executions in a year. By the end of 2025, a total of 19 executions were carried out, setting the highest record number of executions in Florida in a single year.

On July 28, 2026, James Aren Duckett and Dominick Anthony Occhicone Jr., who were both convicted of murder, were executed five hours apart on the same day, marking Florida's first double execution in 62 years. Occhicone was additionally the oldest person executed in Florida at the age of 80. When speaking about the double execution in an interview after it had been carried out, Governor Ron DeSantis said he did not take joy in authorizing the executions, describing the decision as a "weighty" one.

== Gambling expansion ==
In an effort in increase tax revenue for Florida, DeSantis reworked the gaming compact with the Seminole Tribe of Florida in August 2021. Under the provisions, expectations set a minimum of $2.5 billion in new revenue over five years and an estimated $6 billion through 2030. As the Seminole Tribe did not make revenue payments to Florida, it would begin with the expansion of land-based casino gambling and online sports betting. However, the compact spent over two years in courts with many lawsuits brought forth. Requesting the dismissal of West Flagler's writ of quo warranto petition in the Florida Supreme Court, DeSantis argued Florida online sports betting is not a violation of Amendment 3.

== Terrorism ==
In December 2025, DeSantis declared the Council on American–Islamic Relations as a terrorist organization.

== Other issues ==
On January 11, 2019, three days after taking office, DeSantis posthumously pardoned the Groveland Four, a group of black men falsely convicted of rape in 1949. The same day, he officially suspended Broward County sheriff Scott Israel, ostensibly for his responses to the mass shootings at the Marjory Stoneman Douglas High School, appointing Gregory Tony to replace Israel. After the 2020 Republican National Convention was pulled from its originally scheduled host city, Charlotte, DeSantis campaigned to have Florida be the new host state. The main festivities of the RNC, including Trump's keynote speech, were relocated to Jacksonville. Ultimately, the entire event was scrapped in favor of rallies online and on television because of the COVID-19 pandemic.

On May 8, 2023, DeSantis signed bills SB 264 and HB 1355 banning Chinese citizens without green cards from buying land in the state. Critics have warned that the bills could contribute to discrimination against the Chinese and other immigrants. Democratic state representative Anna V. Eskamani voiced concerns about the impact on Asian Americans. Asian American organizations compared the bills to the Alien land laws and the Chinese Exclusion Act.

On January 16, 2025, DeSantis announced his intention to appoint Attorney General Ashley Moody to the U.S. Senate seat vacated by Marco Rubio, who became Secretary of State in the second Trump administration.

On February 17, 2025, DeSantis formally appointed James Uthmeier as the 39th attorney general of Florida, succeeding Ashley Moody.

On February 29, 2024, DeSantis signed the controversial transfer of convicted Miami murderer Enrico Forti to Italy following Biden's request.

On February 24, 2025, DeSantis established the Florida Department of Government Efficiency, a state-level equivalent of the federal Department of Government Efficiency.

On July 16, 2025, DeSantis appointed state senator Blaise Ingoglia as the 5th chief financial officer of Florida, succeeding Jimmy Patronis.

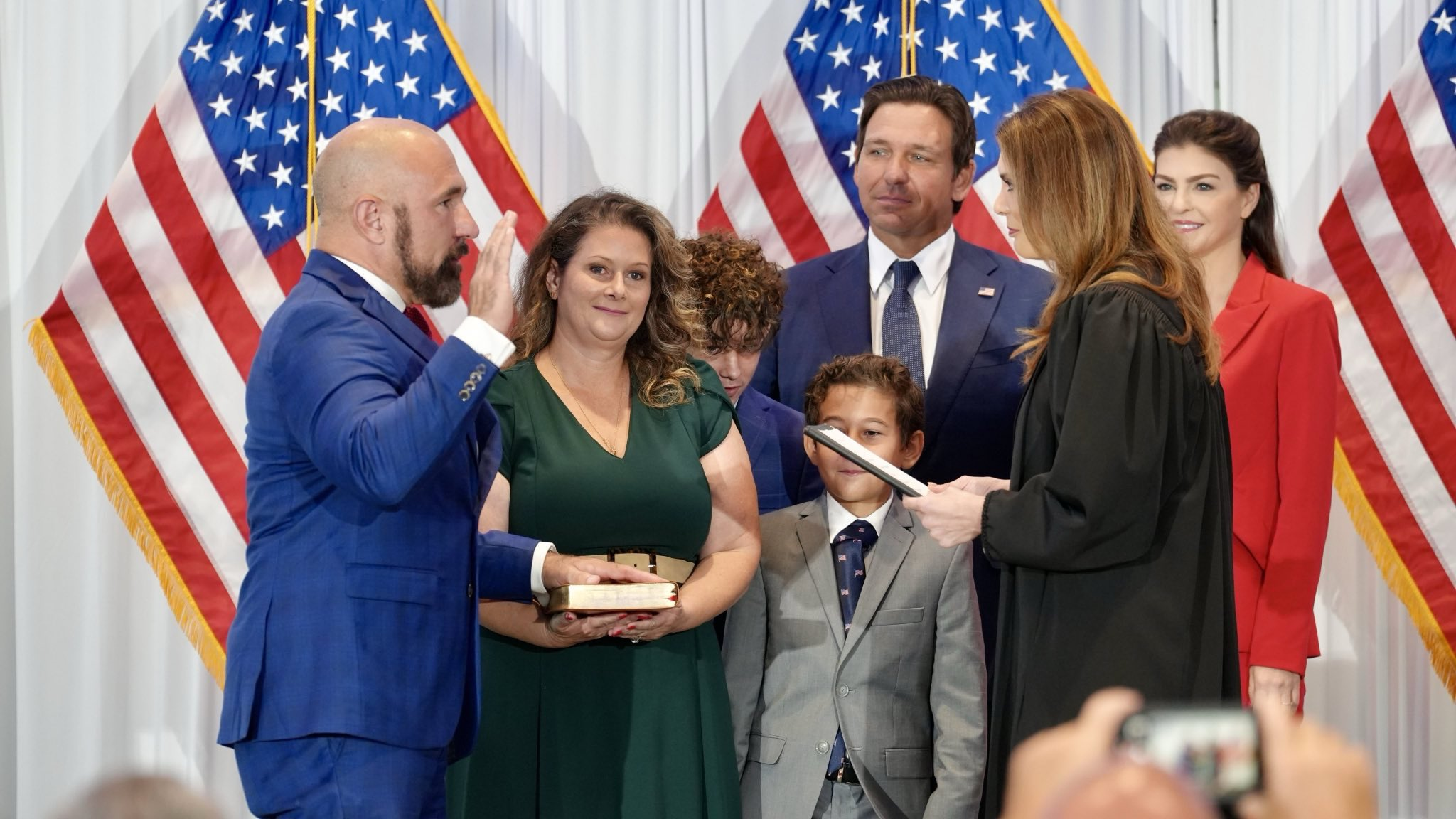
Collins being sworn in by Justice Jamie Grosshans in August 2025

On August 12, 2025, DeSantis appointed state senator Jay Collins as the 21st lieutenant governor of Florida, succeeding Jeanette Nuñez.

== Debate with Gavin Newsom ==
On November 30, 2023, DeSantis participated in a debate hosted by Fox News with California Governor Gavin Newsom over their two contrasting political positions and styles of governance. Topics discussed included response to the COVID-19 pandemic, immigration, education, LGBT issues, and economic policy.

== Hope Florida scandal ==
Centene Corporation is Florida's biggest Medicaid contractor and overbilled Florida $67 million in 2021. Their discussions with Agency for Health Care Administration (AHCA) ended in 2024, and Centene agreed to return the $67 million to the federal and state governments. Ten million dollars of that was sent to the Hope Florida Foundation, founded by Casey DeSantis, which disbursed the funds to two "dark money" political groups opposed to the 2024 Florida Amendment 3, Marijuana Legalization Initiative. The Florida Governor and first lady were adamantly opposed to its passage. Although a majority of Floridians (55.9%) voted for the issue, a supermajority of 60% was required for approval, so it failed to pass. Millions of dollars in state government funds were spent by DeSantis's administration on negative advertisements in the days leading up to the election with both DeSantises making daily appearances to discuss the amendment.

State Representative Alex Andrade is the Republican leading the investigation into Hope Florida. He alleged that James Uthmeier, then DeSantis' chief of staff, directed two non-profit groups, Secure Florida's Future and Save our Society from Drugs, to request money from Hope Florida Foundation. HFF sent $5 million grants to each of the groups, which in turn forwarded the money to the Political Action Committee (PAC) Keep Florida Clean, whose chairperson is Uthmeier Uthmeier has claimed he was not involved and is presently the Florida attorney general, appointed by DeSantis. Andrade claims that text messages from Save our Society from Drugs show Uthmeier's involvement.

Attorney Jeff Aaron is the Registered Agent for the Hope Florida Foundation and provided legal services. The Orlando Business Journal called him the "right-hand man" of Ron DeSantis. His legal work history includes representing the governor when Andrew Warren sued DeSantis following Warren's suspension as Hillsborough County state attorney in 2022. Warren claimed DeSantis violated his First Amendment rights. In January 2024, a three-judge Court of Appeals in Atlanta ruled that DeSantis did violate Warren's First Amendment rights, but DeSantis requested a hearing before the full court. When Warren's original term of office ended in January 2025 before that hearing was conducted, the court dismissed the case as moot.

Aaron was appointed to the Florida Public Employees Relations Commission (PERC) by DeSantis in 2021 as a part-time commissioner and earns approximately $78,000 yearly from the state. He was reappointed by DeSantis in 2025 to serve until 2029. On April 19, 2025, the Orlando Sentinel stated that Aaron became general counsel of the Greater Orlando Aviation Authority in January 2025 at a billing rate of nearly $600 per hour. Aaron referred to the Hope Florida controversy as "a politically motivated witch hunt." On May 20, 2025, State Attorney Jack Campbell of the Second Judicial Circuit Court opened a criminal investigation into the controversy.

== Public opinion polling ==
=== 2019 ===
In a Mason-Dixon Polling & Strategy survey in March 2019, DeSantis received a 62 percent job approval rating from statewide voters, and a 24 percent disapproval rating in the same survey. That survey also found that DeSantis had the support from 66 percent of white voters, 39 percent of black voters, and 41 percent from Democratic voters. Another poll that same month conducted by Quinnipiac University found a slightly different result, showing DeSantis with a 59–17 percent (approval-disapproval) rating. In June 2019, another poll conducted by Quinnipiac University found the governor's approval rating to be 55 percent, and a Morning Consult poll found it to be 57 percent. By the end of 2019, a Mason-Dixon Polling & Strategy survey showed that DeSantis' ratings remained high, with 65 percent approving and 26 percent disapproving.

=== 2020 ===
According to a January 2020 Saint Leo University poll, DeSantis began the year with his highest approval rating yet at 68 percent. But amid the COVID-19 pandemic, his approval rating gradually declined during the summer and eventually bottomed out at 45 percent in late August. In an October 2020 polling survey by Florida Atlantic University, the governor's ratings stood at 43 percent approving and 48 percent disapproving.

=== 2021 ===
DeSantis' approval ratings began recovering in early 2021. He began the year with a 45 percent approval rating, but by March it had reached 53 percent, and by May it had reached 55 percent in a Florida Commerce poll. Amid a sudden spike of COVID-19 cases in August, DeSantis saw his ratings fall to 47 percent approving and 45 percent disapproving in a CBS News poll. His ratings rebounded to 56 percent approving in an October 17–23 polling survey by Saint Leo University.

=== 2022 ===
In February 2022, a poll conducted by the University of North Florida found that DeSantis was the most popular elected official in Florida, with a 58 percent approval rating. The next month a Saint Leo University poll found that his approval rating had ticked up to 59 percent. According to a Mason-Dixon Polling & Strategy survey, DeSantis had an approval rating of 55 percent going into the 2022 Florida gubernatorial election. After his win, DeSantis garnered an approval rating of 59 percent according the same institute, with 39 percent disapproving.

=== 2023 ===
In late 2023, during his presidential campaign, opinion of DeSantis' governorship became considerably more divided, with Morning Consult and FAU surveys finding that his approval ratings were 51 percent and 49 percent, respectively.

=== 2024 ===
In June 2024, a Fox News poll placed DeSantis's approval rating at 52 percent.
