= Hope Florida scandal =

Florida political scandal that began in 2025

The Hope Florida scandal is a political scandal that arose after the Hope Florida Foundation, founded by First Lady Casey DeSantis, received $10 million from a Medicaid fraud legal settlement between Centene Corporation and the Florida Agency for Health Care Administration (AHCA) and then diverted the proceeds to political action committees (PACs) with ties to the Ron DeSantis administration and the Republican Party of Florida to oppose the 2024 recreational marijuana ballot measure. Hope Florida's chairman admitted mistakes and "lapses in reporting procedures", including missing federal tax reports.

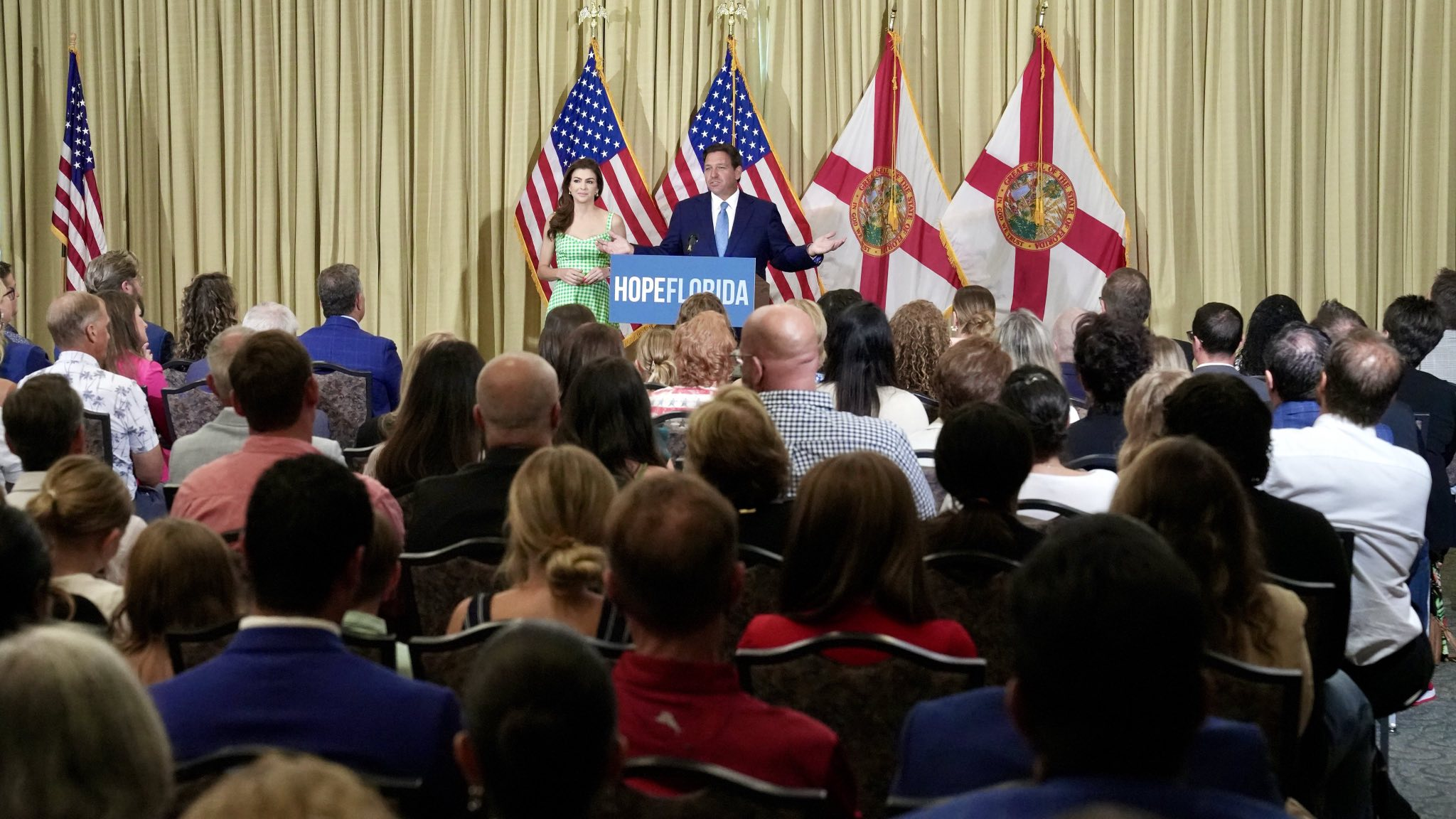
Ron and Casey DeSantis speaking at a Hope Florida event in July 2024

In 2025, the Republican-controlled Florida House of Representatives under House Speaker Daniel Perez opened an investigation into the accusations of money laundering and wire fraud, but halted its investigation after Hope Florida refused to continue cooperating.

In May 2025, State Attorney Jack Campbell opened a criminal investigation into the allegations of political corruption. On January 28, 2026, a grand jury found that the DeSantis administration illegally misappropriated $10 million in taxpayer money to Hope Florida, but did not criminally indict anyone because they could not prove who exactly was responsible. The grand jury report was unknown to the public until August 2026, when it was leaked to CBS News. On October 7, 2026, a Florida appellate court ordered the grand jury's report to be expunged and rejected its conclusion that $10 million tied to a Medicaid settlement had been misappropriated as the transfer of money between Centere and Hope Florida was not public money and entirely legal.

The Hope Florida scandal became a talking point during the 2026 Florida elections, including the gubernatorial election.

== Background ==
In 2021, First Lady Casey DeSantis founded the Hope Florida Foundation, a charity to connect underprivileged Floridians with government resources, nonprofits, the private sector and religious organizations. The Foundation was created to aid Hope Florida, a state agency under the Florida Department of Children and Families, whose "Navigators" are state employees that work with people to find solutions from the private sector, faith-based communities, and nonprofits to help them use all the local community resources available and reduce the need for the government's help.

The 2024 Florida Amendment 3 was a proposed constitutional amendment to the Florida Constitution that would have legalized cannabis for possession, purchase, and recreational use in Florida for adults 21 years or older. Under the Florida Constitution, constitutional amendment require a 60% supermajority of voters in favor to be adopted. The DeSantis administration was adamantly opposed to its passage and spent millions of dollars in campaigning against it. The Amendment ultimately failed the 60% threshold as only 55.9% of Floridians voted in favor of its passage.

== Events ==
In 2021, Centene Corporation, Florida's biggest Medicaid contractor, overbilled Florida $67 million. On February 7, 2023, Centene Corporation offered to pay the State of Florida $67 million to settle any potential liability. On June 1, 2023, the Florida Division of Elections validated the required signatures for Amendment 3 to qualify via the citizens initiative process. On April 1, 2024, the Florida Supreme Court approved the amendment for placement on the general ballot for the 2024 Florida election. On September 27, 2024, AHCA negotiated with Centere for them to pay $57 million to the State of Florida and $10 million to the Hope Florida Foundation. The settlement agreement was signed by Chief Deputy Attorney General John Guard, AHCA Secretary Jason Weida, Florida Office of Insurance Regulation Commissioner Michael Yaworsky, and Florida Department of Health Chief of Staff Cassandra Pasley.

The Hope Florida Foundation disbursed the $10 million to Secure Florida's Future and Save our Society from Drugs, two non-profits opposed to the 2024 Florida Amendment 3. These two non-profits then funneled the $10 million to Keep Florida Clean, a PAC chaired by James Uthmeier, DeSantis's chief of staff. The PAC then used the money to campaign against Amendment 3 and for the Republican Party of Florida. All these financial transactions occurred over the span of a few days.

== Investigations ==
=== State investigations ===
In early 2025, the Florida House of Representatives briefly investigated the Hope Florida Foundation, but ended its investigation due to "lack of cooperation" from the DeSantis administration. State Representative Alex Andrade, the Republican who led the bipartisan investigation into Hope Florida, claims that text messages from Save our Society from Drugs show Uthmeier's involvement and accused him of money laundering and wire fraud. Uthmeier denied any involvement and has since been appointed as Florida attorney general by DeSantis.

On May 20, 2025, State Attorney Jack Campbell of the Second Judicial Circuit Court opened a criminal investigation into the alleged money laundering and wire fraud scheme. In a statement to the press, Campbell said: "As for (an) investigation, the only source of information I have received is from members of the press," and "The Florida Legislature has many good lawyers including some former prosecutors. I am sure they would refer any evidence of crimes to me if they found them."

In October 2025, state prosecutors issued multiple subpoenas for witnesses to testify before a grand jury. On October 14, 2025, several current and former DeSantis administration officials were questioned during the inquiry about a "conspiracy to commit money laundering and wire fraud". In January 2026, a grand jury found that the DeSantis administration misappropriated taxpayer money when it diverted $10 million from a Medicaid settlement in 2021 into the Hope Florida Foundation, arguing the transfer was "part of a sophisticated scheme to fund political activities". Additionally, the grand jury suggests that the DeSantis administration took advantage of the disorder caused by Hurricane Helene and Hurricane Milton to covertly fund the campaign against the 2024 Florida Amendment 3, Marijuana Legalization Initiative. No criminal charges were recommended because the grand jury could not determine who was specifically responsible for the misuse of taxpayer money for political purposes. However, the grand jury implicated James Uthmeier, then DeSantis' chief of staff, Ashley Moody, then Florida's Attorney General, and Jason Weida, then the secretary of AHCA. The grand jury's report was leaked in August 2026 to CBS News, despite alleged attempts from Attorney General Uthmeier to prevent its release.

According to the report, Moody, then Florida's attorney general, authorized her chief deputy, John Guard, to sign the settlement agreement with Centene. Guard testified that he had reservations about the arrangement, acknowledging the $10 million was taxpayer money that belonged to the state and that Florida law required the legislature, not the executive branch, to decide how it was spent. The settlement was subsequently rewritten so that the state's Agency for Health Care Administration, rather than the attorney general's office, was listed as directing Centene to send the funds to Hope Florida. Moody denied any intentional wrongdoing or knowledge of how the funds would ultimately be spent and was not criminally charged, as the grand jury could not establish individual liability.

On October 7, 2026, a three-judge panel of the Florida First District Court of Appeal ruled in favor of the DeSantis administration and ordered the grand jury report to be expunged. The court found that the grand jury exceeded its legal authority by making individualized accusations criminal wrongdoing without issuing any criminal indictments. Additionally, the court held that the grand jury's had no basis to find that the DeSantis administration was culpable of any wrongdoing because the $10 million was transferred between two private entities and was never public money. The court explained that there is no law prohibiting state-negotiated settlement agreements from making a private entity pay a private third-party.

=== Federal investigation ===
Upon the urging of multiple Florida congress members, the U.S. Department of Health and Human Services and the Centers for Medicare & Medicaid Services are reviewing a potential federal investigation.

== Reactions ==
After the controversy became public, the DeSantises received bipartisan condemnation from Florida political leaders. Governor DeSantis spoke to the press, saying: "Everything that’s been thrown at [Hope Florida] is pure politics," and "I believe in this program deeply and stand by it 100%." In regards to the two $5 million donations, DeSantis said: "This was in addition to what they [Hope Florida] were getting. This is kind of like a cherry on top where they agreed to make an additional contribution." DeSantis has pursued political retribution against Republicans who have criticized his actions.

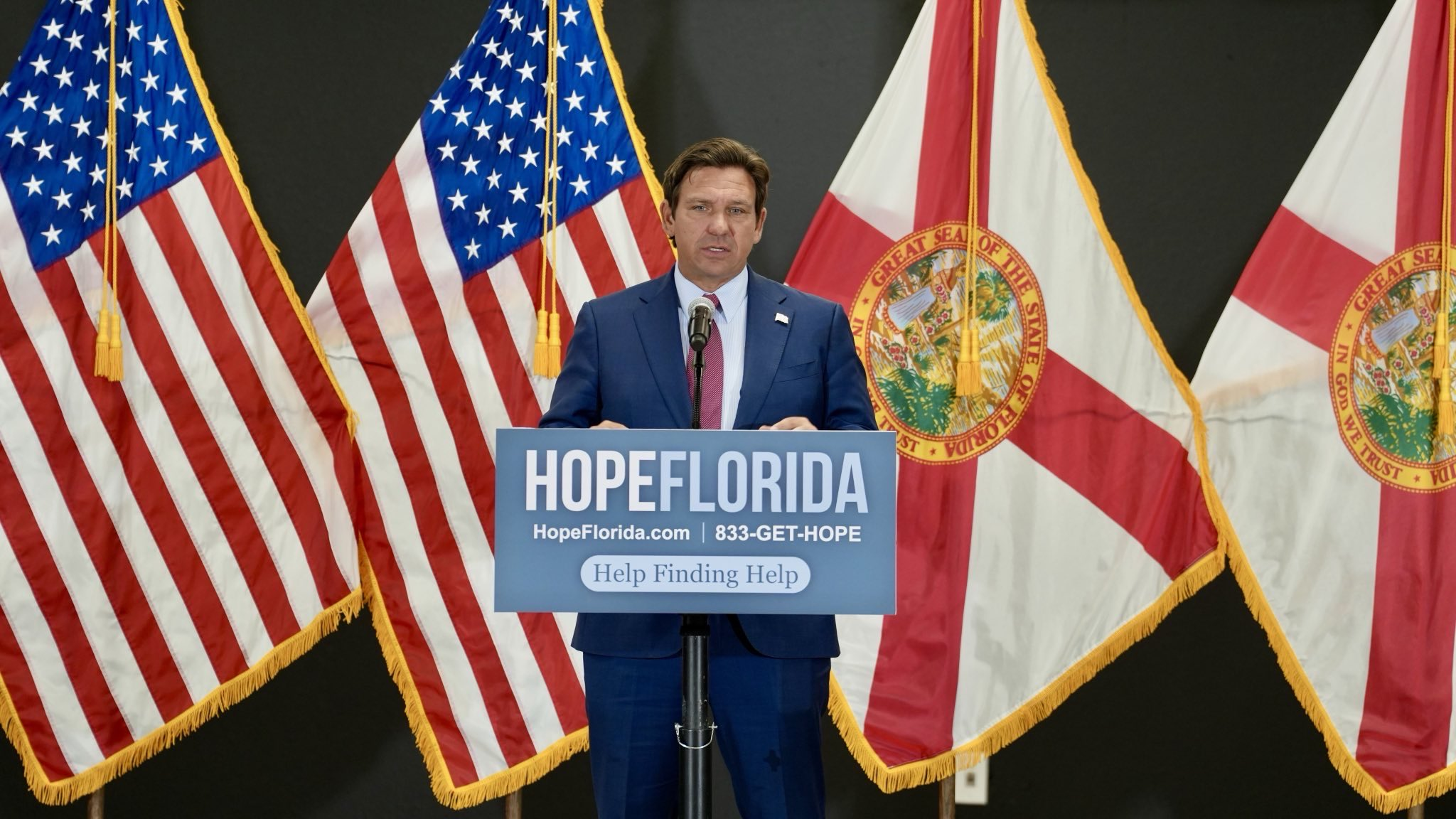
Governor DeSantis speaking at a Hope Florida conference in Lake County, Florida, April 2025

Attorney Jeff Aaron is the Registered Agent for the Hope Florida Foundation and provided legal services. The Orlando Business Journal called him the "right-hand man" of Ron DeSantis. His legal work history includes representing the governor when Andrew H. Warren sued DeSantis following Warren's suspension as Hillsborough County state attorney in 2022. Warren claimed DeSantis violated his First Amendment rights. In January 2024, a 3-judge Court of Appeals in Atlanta ruled that DeSantis did violate Warren's First Amendment rights, but DeSantis requested a hearing before the full court. When Warren's original term of office ended in January 2025 before that hearing was conducted, the court dismissed the case as moot. Aaron was appointed to the Florida Public Employees Relations Commission (PERC) by DeSantis in 2021 as a "part-time" commissioner and earns approximately $78K yearly from the state. He was reappointed by DeSantis in 2025 to serve until 2029. Under Florida Statute 447, members of PERC "shall not be employed by, or hold any commission with, any governmental unit in the state or any employee organization, as defined in this part, while in such office." On April 19, 2025 the Orlando Sentinel stated that Aaron became general counsel of the Greater Orlando Aviation Authority in January 2025 at a billing rate of nearly $600 per hour. Aaron referred to the Hope Florida controversy as "a politically motivated witch hunt."

In April 2025, former Republican U.S. representative Matt Gaetz called for the impeachment of James Uthmeier as Attorney General.

In May 2025, the Florida Democratic Party demanded that the Governor reimburse the $10 million to the state government. Later that month, U.S. representatives Kathy Castor and Darren Soto wrote a letter to the Office of Inspector General, U.S. Department of Health and Human Services demanding a federal investigation into "unlawful diversion of Medicaid funds in Florida".

In June 2025, the Florida Legislature defunded the Office of Hope Florida within the Florida Department of Education.

In May 2025, state senator Jay Collins was described as a "vocal advocate" for Hope Florida, saying: "The money was being appropriated and used for the right reasons." In May 2025, Collins spoke alongside DeSantis to defend the "great accomplishments of Hope Florida". In August 2025, Collins praised Hope Florida during his speech at a Republican Party of Florida forum. Later that month, Collins was appointed by DeSantis as Lieutenant Governor of Florida.

In October 2026, following the Florida appellate court's decision absolving the DeSantis administration of any wrongdoing, an Uthmeier spokesman proclaimed "COMPLETE AND TOTAL VICTORY." DeSantis touted the court's ruling calling it "probably the biggest judicial smackdown that I have ever seen in my entire career as an elected official" and vowed to prosecute anyone who leaked the grand jury report. In contrast, Florida Democratic Party chair Nikki Fried stated, "The ruling doesn't change what happened in the Hope Florida scandal: $10 million from a Medicaid settlement was routed through a charity… and ultimately used to fund a political campaign. This is what unchecked power looks like after decades of one-party rule in Tallahassee. Voters will have the final say this November."

== See also ==
- List of federal political scandals in the United States
- List of lists of American state and local politicians convicted of crimes
