= Mark Wilson (lobbyist) =

American nonprofit executive

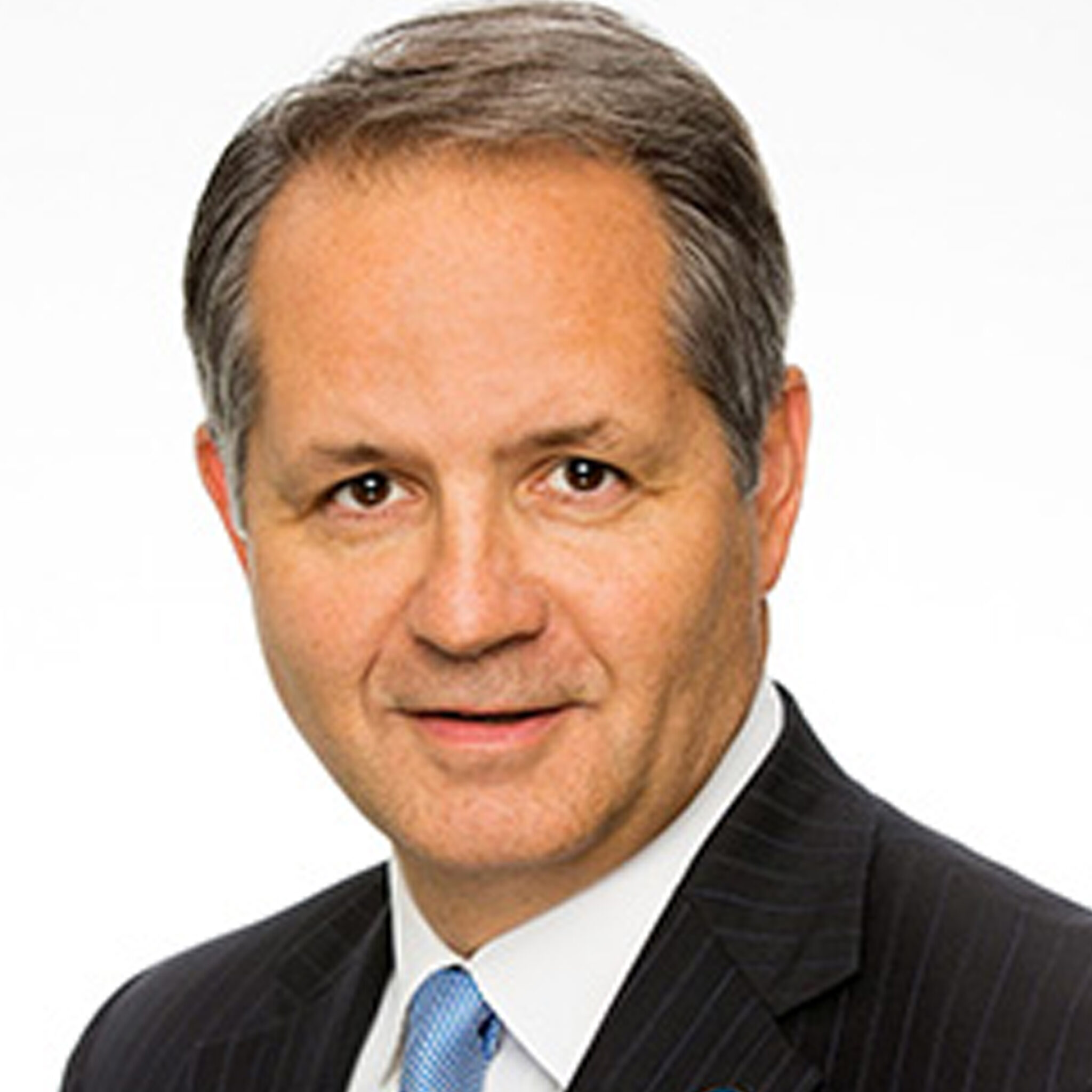
- Born: Illinois, U.S.
- Education: University of Georgia (BS)
- Title: President & CEO of the Florida Chamber of Commerce
- Term: 2008–present
- Children: 3

Mark Wilson is an American nonprofit executive and lobbyist who has been president and CEO of the Florida Chamber of Commerce since 2008.

== Early life and education ==
Born and raised in Illinois, Wilson earned his bachelor's degree in business from the University of Georgia in 1991.

== Career ==
From 1991 to 1994, Wilson worked as a membership and legislative manager for the U.S. Chamber of Commerce Midwest office. He worked as vice president of the Chicagoland Chamber from 1994 to 1997. In 1998, Wilson joined the Florida Chamber of Commerce as vice president of membership and marketing. He was promoted to president and CEO in 2008. As president, Wilson has endorsed political candidates across Florida from both the Democratic and Republican parties.

In March 2016, Wilson testified before the United States House Committee on Ways and Means. Wilson is a member of the board of directors of SelectFlorida, appointed by the Governor of Florida.

=== Hope Florida scandal ===
In the 2024 Florida Amendment 4 election, Wilson served as treasurer and co-chair of the "Vote No on 4" campaign to stop abortion rights. In 2025, investigators found Secure Florida's Future, a nonprofit chaired by Wilson, received a $5 million grant from Hope Florida, which in turn forwarded the money to the political action committee (PAC) "Keep Florida Clean", whose chairperson was Governor Ron DeSantis's chieff of staff James Uthmeier. The funds Secure Florida's Future received were diverted from state funds awarded in a lawsuit settlement.

Wilson was set to testify before the Florida House of Representatives investigation, but backed out minutes before he was set to speak. He later released a statement about the investigation, saying: "[the investigation] would infringe bedrock associational rights, undermining the organization and chilling its constitutionally protected conduct." His decision to not testify was criticized by Representative Debra Tendrich. The controversy is currently under criminal investigation by State Attorney Jack Campbell.

== Personal life ==
Wilson lives in Florida and has three children.
