= Hope Florida =

Florida community-based welfare assistance program

The Hope Florida Foundation, Inc.
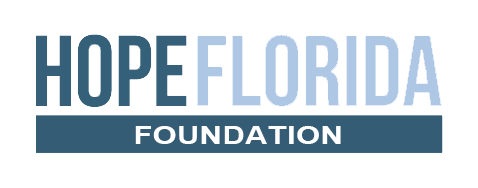
- Formation: August 25, 2023
- Type: Charitable foundation
- Tax ID no.: 93-3379025
- Headquarters: 2415 N. Monroe Street, Suite 400, Tallahassee, Florida, US
- President: Joshua T. Hay
- Key people: Jeff Aaron; Stephanie White; Fatima Perez; Jake Farmer; Tina Vidal-Duart
- Website: hopefloridafoundation.com

Hope Florida is a community-based welfare assistance program initiative founded on September 9, 2021 by Casey DeSantis, wife of Florida Governor Ron DeSantis. It is a state agency under the Florida Department of Children and Families (DCF). The organization is supported by its state-created charity arm, the Hope Florida Foundation, created in August 2023, which is a Direct Support Organization (DSO). DSOs are authorized under Florida statute for the "sole purpose" of "support[ing] the department in carrying out its purposes and responsibilities." In 2025 Ron DeSantis was pushing for Hope Florida to be codified into state law, which led to an investigation of the program by a State House committee. That April, news of a scandal involving the Hope Florida Foundation broke; it was reported that in 2024 a state grand jury had found that the Foundation had misappropriated $10 million from a Medicaid legal settlement, and diverted the money to Republican political entities. This news followed reports that Casey DeSantis was considering a run for governor in 2026 to succeed her husband, who is term-limited.

== Background ==
The Hope Florida initiative, founded in 2021 by First Lady Casey DeSantis is intended to raise money, via the Hope Florida Foundation, in order to help move people off of government assistance programs, like Medicaid, and into services provided by private charities and religious organizations instead, seeking to "put families on the path to self-sufficiency."

The program operates a call line for Florida residents in need, staffed by between 100 to 150 state employees, dubbed "Hope Navigators", who are supposed to help those Floridians access local nongovernmental resources. Callers to the hotline can then be entered into an online "CarePortal", which can also be accessed by participating churches and nonprofits who can see what a person is seeking and choose whether to help them.

The Florida Hope Foundation also pays the nonprofits they work with. Minutes from an October 2024 board meeting noted that those compensation decisions were being made on an "ad hoc basis." According to The Tampa Bay Times, news releases showed that "churches have been getting increments of between $10,000 and $40,000."

According to Governor Ron DeSantis, the program was hugely successful. In April of 2025, he announced that a Hope Florida liaison would be added to every sheriff's office in the state. He also said of the program, "Since this has been implemented, we’ve gotten 30,000 people off welfare and saved the state of Florida $100 million. And so that’s a great success story." According to The Tampa Bay Times, by that April, Desantis and his administration had "been citing some variation of the 30,000 figure for at least 10 months". They noted that on the program's website, it was claimed that number included Floridians "with reduced reliance or no longer relying on public assistance", but that ultimately "how the state arrived at those numbers is unclear."

Taylor Hatch, Secretary of the Florida Department of Children and Families, said that most of the state's savings from the program were due to families who were no longer receiving food assistance. However, the state's Supplemental Nutrition Assistance Program (SNAP), which around 3 million Floridians rely on, is entirely funded by the federal government.

Florida's Agency for Health Care Administration reportedly "embedded" the Hope Florida program into every contract with the state’s Medicaid providers, worth a collective $28 billion, and which serve around 4.2 million Florida residents. Per those contracts, for a period of five years, Medicaid providers would be given preferential treatment for "graduating" Floridians off of the program. By April 2025, the contracts were already in effect, but the state had not defined what "graduating" from Medicaid meant.

As of 2025, around 4.2 million Floridians were enrolled Medicaid, a number which had decreased from about 5.8 million in 2023 as the state has made eligibility requirements more strict. In Florida, single, working, low-income adults without children do not qualify for Medicaid. This, most of those in Florida who are on Medicaid are children, the disabled, pregnant women, parents, and caretakers. Applicants are also subject to maximum monthly income limits. For instance, in order for a parent from a family of three to qualify for Medicare, they must earn less than $598 a month, which is an annual salary of $7,176. However, such an individual is not eligible to receive subsidies under the Affordable Care Act unless they earn a minimum of $26,650 a year (the federal poverty line). This means that, unless such a person is able to quadruple their salary, if they make even slightly more than $7,176 a year, they would be inellgible for either program, and likely fall into a "coverage gap" and lose their health insurance altogether.

Because of this, experts have questioned whether it would even be possible for Hope Florida to facilitate such drastic improvements in people's financial circumstances. Katy DeBriere, a Medicaid attorney with the Florida Health Justice Project, told The Tampa Bay Times "'You'd have to fundamentally shift the economy' to graduate a meaningful number of people from Medicaid without them losing their health insurance".

In 2025, Ron DeSantis was pushing for the program to be codified into state law. In the Florida State House of Representatives, Anne Gerwig sponsored HB 1327, also known as the Hope Florida Act, which would create the Hope Florida Office within the Executive Office of the Governor. A companion bill was introduced in the State Senate, sponsored by Danny Burgess, which would require all state agencies to participate in Hope Florida if directed to do so by the Executive Office of the Governor. However, existing Florida law states that a direct-support organization (DSO) must submit several items to the agency it supports (which in this case is the Department of Children and Families), including a copy of the DSO's code of ethics and its most recent tax returns; each DSO which has annual expenditures in excess of $100,000 are also required to provide an annual financial audit of its accounts and records. The House bill analysis noted that Hope Florida had not submitted those reports. This prompted investigation by a State House committee.

== Hope Florida Foundation ==
In the charity's first year of operation, donations totaled $867,000, almost exclusively from corporations doing business with the Florida state government or regulated by it. Disbursements were minimal.

There are allegations that $10 million originating from a Medicaid overbilling settlement were inappropriately transferred to political action committees and ultimately used to fund advertising opposing an amendment to the Florida constitution which would have legalized recreational use of marijuana. CBS News and others have reported on a grand jury report released outside of official channels.

The Hope Florida Foundation chairperson spoke to a Florida House committee on April 15, 2025 and testified that the organization did not follow state laws regarding governance, ethics or oversight. There were no bylaws or budget, minutes from meetings were not recorded, tax returns were not filed and they did not question the receipt and disbursement of $10 million.

== Funds diversion to political action groups ==
Centene Corporation, Florida's biggest Medicaid contractor, overbilled Florida taxpayers $67 million for medical services in 2021. In 2024 Centene reached a settlement with Florida's Agency for Health Care Administration (AHCA), agreeing to repay the $67 million. It was supposed to be returned to state or federal bodies, however $10 million of that money was instead sent to the Hope Florida Foundation, which disbursed the funds to two "dark money" political groups opposed to the 2024 Florida Amendment 3, a Marijuana Legalization Initiative. The Florida governor and first lady were also adamantly opposed to its passage. Although a majority of 55.9% of Floridians voted for the issue, a super-majority of 60% was required for approval, so it failed to pass. Millions of dollars in taxpayer money were spent by DeSantis on negative advertisements in the days leading up to the election, with both DeSantises making daily appearances to speak against the amendment.

Republican State Representative Alex Andrade is leading the House investigation into Hope Florida. He alleges that James Uthmeier, then DeSantis' chief of staff, directed two non-profit groups, Secure Florida's Future and Save our Society from Drugs, to request money from Hope Florida Foundation. HFF sent $5 million grants to each of the groups, which in turn forwarded the money to the Political Action Committee (PAC) "Keep Florida Clean", whose chairperson is Uthmeier. Despite this, Uthmeier – who was appointed by DeSantis to the position of Florida Attorney General in February 2025 –has claimed he was not involved. Andrade claims that text messages from Save our Society from Drugs show Uthmeier's involvement.

Attorney Jeff Aaron is the registered agent for the Hope Florida Foundation and provided legal services. The Orlando Business Journal called him the "right-hand man" of Ron DeSantis. His legal work history includes representing the governor when Andrew Warren sued DeSantis following Warren's suspension as Hillsborough County state attorney in 2022. Warren claimed DeSantis violated his First Amendment rights. In January 2024, a three-judge court of appeals in Atlanta ruled that DeSantis did violate Warren's First Amendment rights, but DeSantis requested a hearing before the full court. When Warren's original term of office ended in January 2025 before that hearing was conducted, the court dismissed the case as moot.

Aaron was appointed to the Florida Public Employees Relations Commission (PERC) by DeSantis in 2021 as a "part-time" commissioner, and earns approximately $78K yearly from the state. He was reappointed by DeSantis in 2025 to serve until 2029. Under Florida Statute 447, members of PERC "shall not be employed by, or hold any commission with, any governmental unit in the state or any employee organization, as defined in this part, while in such office." On April 19, 2025, the Orlando Sentinel stated that Aaron became general counsel of the Greater Orlando Aviation Authority in January 2025 at a billing rate of nearly $600 per hour. Aaron referred to the Hope Florida controversy as "a politically motivated witch hunt."

On May 20, 2025, State Attorney Jack Campbell of the Second Judicial Circuit Court opened a criminal investigation into the allegations of money laundering and wire fraud.. A grand jury tasked with investigating the allegations completed a report in January 2026. This report was subsequently released outside of official channels and has been reported on by a number of media organizations. The grand jury did not recommend criminal charges.

=== Directors ===
As of 2025, the directors were Joshua Hay, Fatima Perez, Tina Vidal-Duart, Stephanie White and Wendy Nissan.
