= 2024 Florida Amendment 3 =

- November 5, 2024
- Adult Personal Use of Marijuana
- Outcome: Amendment not adopted (failed to reach 60% threshold)

Results
Choice	Votes	%
Yes	5,950,589	55.90%
No	4,693,524	44.10%
Valid votes	10,644,113	96.73%
Invalid or blank votes	360,096	3.27%
Total votes	11,004,209	100.00%
Registered voters/turnout	13,949,168	78.89%

Yes
60–70%
50–60%
No
60–70%
50–60%

Florida Amendment 3 was a proposed constitutional amendment to the Florida Constitution subject to a direct voter referendum on November 5, 2024, that would have legalized cannabis for possession, purchase, and recreational use in Florida for adults 21 years or older. The amendment achieved a majority 56% support among voters in the U.S. state of Florida but failed to reach the 60% supermajority required for adoption.

This bill was largely sponsored by current medical cannabis companies that aim to expand the state's cannabis economy. The amendment does not address home-growing or possession, unless in the container from the approved store.

== History ==
The initiative was registered with authorities around August 2022 for signature collection and assigned initiative number 22-05. To qualify for the ballot, 891,589 valid signatures were required. By December 1, 2022, it had gotten 53,982 signatures. With 294,037 validated signatures by early 2023, an automatic state supreme court legal review was triggered. 635,961 signatures were validated by the Florida Secretary of State as of April 4, and there were 841,130 validated signatures by May 1. Around June 1, the Florida Division of Elections validated 967,528 signatures – enough for the measure to qualify for the 2024 ballot. The Florida Supreme Court issued a ruling on April 1, 2024 approving the amendment for placement on the November general ballot.

== Content ==
The ballot summary for the amendment stated the following:

Allows adults 21 years or older to possess, purchase, or use marijuana products and marijuana accessories for non-medical personal consumption by smoking, ingestion, or otherwise; allows Medical Marijuana Treatment Centers, and other state licensed entities, to acquire, cultivate, process, manufacture, sell, and distribute such products and accessories. Applies to Florida law; does not change, or immunize violations of, federal law. Establishes possession limits for personal use. Allows consistent legislation. Defines terms. Provides effective date.

The financial impact statement for the amendment stated the following:

The amendment’s financial impact primarily comes from expected sales tax collections. If legal today, sales of non-medical marijuana would be subject to sales tax and would remain so if voters approve this amendment. Based on other states’ experiences, expected retail sales of non-medical marijuana would generate at least $195.6 million annually in state and local sales tax revenues once the retail market is fully operational, although the timing of this occurring is unclear. Under current law, the existing statutory framework for medical marijuana is repealed six months after the effective date of this amendment which affects how this amendment will be implemented. A new regulatory structure for both medical and nonmedical use of marijuana will be needed. Its design cannot be fully known until the legislature acts; however, regulatory costs will probably be offset by regulatory fees. Other potential costs and savings cannot be predicted.

== Support and opposition ==
Yes

Executive branch officials

- Donald Trump, President of the United States (2017–2021) (Republican)

U.S. Representatives

- Lois Frankel, U.S. Representative from FL-22 (Note: Numbered as the 22nd from 2013–2017 & as the 21st from 2017–2023) (2013–present) (Democrat)

State legislators

- Joe Gruters, state senator (2018–present) and former chair of the Republican Party of Florida (2019–2023) (Republican)
- Shevrin Jones, state senator (2020–present) (Democrat)
- Jason Pizzo, state senator (2018–present) (Democrat)
- Bobby Powell, state senator (2016–2024) (Democrat)

Sheriffs

- Morris Young, sheriff of Gadsden County (2004–present) (Democrat)
- Gordon Smith, sheriff of Bradford County (2009–present) (Republican)

Local officials

- Donna Deegan, mayor of Jacksonville (2023–present) (Democrat)
- Daniella Levine Cava, mayor of Miami-Dade County (2020–present) (Democrat)

Individuals

- The Bellamy Brothers
- John Morgan, lawyer and founder of Morgan & Morgan (Independent)
- Dave Portnoy, businessman and founder of Barstool Sports
- Roger Stone, political consultant to Donald Trump 2016 presidential campaign (Republican)
- Jeff Roe, Republican political consultant (Republican)
- Ricky Williams, former professional football player (1999–2011)

Organizations

- Florida Democratic Party
- Libertarian Party of Florida
- Florida Young Republicans
- Florida Alliance for Retired Americans
- American Civil Liberties Union of Florida
- Trulieve, medical cannabis company

Labor unions

- SEIU Florida
No

Statewide officials

- Ron DeSantis, Governor of Florida (2019–present) (Republican)
- Casey DeSantis, First Lady of Florida (2019–present) (Republican)
- Manny Díaz Jr., Education Commissioner of Florida (2022–2025) (Republican)
- Joseph Ladapo, Surgeon General of Florida (2021–present)
- Jeanette Nuñez, Lieutenant Governor of Florida (2019–2025) (Republican)

U.S. senators

- Rick Scott, U.S. Senator from Florida (2019–present) (Republican)

U.S. representatives

- Byron Donalds, FL-19 (2021–present) (Republican)
- Neal Dunn, Fl-02 (2017–present) (Republican)
- Matt Gaetz, FL-01 (2017–2024) (Republican)

State legislators

- Ben Albritton, state senator (2018–present) (Republican)
- Ileana Garcia, state senator (2020–present) (Republican)
- Sam Garrison, state representative (2020–present) (Republican)
- Jonathan Martin, state senator (2022–present) (Republican)
- Daniel Perez, state representative (2018–present) (Republican)
- Joel Rudman, state representative (2022–2025) (Republican)

Sheriffs

- Michelle Cook, sheriff of Clay County (2020–present) (Republican)
- Grady Judd, sheriff of Polk County (2005–present) (Republican)
- Wayne Ivey, sheriff of Brevard County (2013–present)(Republican)
- Bill Leeper, sheriff of Nassau County (2013–present) (Republican)
- T. K. Waters, sheriff of Jacksonville (2022–present) (Republican)

Local officials

- Esteban Bovo, Mayor of Hialeah (2021–2025) (Republican)

Organizations

- Florida Sheriffs Association
- Republican Party of Florida

== Polling ==
A 60% supermajority vote was required for the amendment to be approved.

Poll source	Date(s) administered	Sample size (Note: Key: A – all adults RV – registered voters LV – likely voters V – unclear)	Margin of error	For (Note: 60% approval is required for a Florida constitutional amendment)	Against	Undecided
Stetson University	October 25 – November 1, 2024	452 (LV)	± 5.0%	64%	36%	–
Florida Atlantic University/Mainstreet Research	October 19–27, 2024	913 (RV)	± 3.2%	60%	34%	6%
Emerson College (Note: Poll sponsored by Nexstar Media)	October 18–20, 2024	860 (LV)	± 3.3%	60%	34%	6%
Cherry Communications (R) (Note: Poll sponsored by the Florida Chamber of Commerce)	October 10–20, 2024	614 (LV)	± 4.3%	57%	?	?
University of North Florida	October 7–18, 2024	865 (LV)	± 3.49%	66%	30%	4%
Mason-Dixon Polling & Strategy	October 1–4, 2024	625 (RV)	± 4.0%	58%	35%	7%
Public Policy Polling (D) (Note: Poll sponsored by Clean and Prosperous America PAC)	September 25–26, 2024	808 (RV)	± 3.5%	58%	35%	7%
Victory Insights (R)	September 22–25, 2024	600 (LV)	± 4.4%	54%	29%	17%
Cherry Communications (R)	August 15–26, 2024	600 (LV)	± 4.0%	59%	?	?
Public Policy Polling (D)	August 21–22, 2024	837 (RV)	± 3.4%	57%	34%	9%
Florida Atlantic University/Mainstreet Research	August 10–11, 2024	1,055 (RV)	± 3.0%	56%	29%	15%
Suffolk University/USA Today	August 7–11, 2024	500 (LV)	± 4.4%	63%	33%	3%
The Tyson Group (Note: Poll sponsored by Vote No on 3)	July 2024	1,500 (LV)	± 2.53%	64%	27%	9%
University of North Florida	July 24–27, 2024	774 (LV)	± 4.6%	64%	31%	5%
Beacon Research (D)/Shaw & Company Research (R) (Note: Poll sponsored by Fox News)	June 1–4, 2024	1,075 (RV)	± 3%	66%	32%	2%
Cherry Communications (R)	April 28 – May 7, 2024	609 (LV)	± 4.0%	58%	37%	5%
Florida Atlantic University/Mainstreet Research	April 15–17, 2024	865 (A)	± 3.3%	47%	35%	18%
USA Today/IPSOS	April 5–7, 2024	1,014 (A)	± 4.1%	56%	40%	4%
The Tyson Group	February 2024	1,764 (LV)	± 2.33%	65%	22%	13%
University of North Florida	November 6–26, 2023	716 (RV)	± 4.37%	67%	28%	5%

== Results ==
=== By county ===
County	Yes		No		Total
County	#	%	#	%	Total
Alachua	90,219	66.39%	45,673	33.61%	135,892
Baker	6,513	43.72%	8,385	56.28%	14,898
Bay	54,359	55.91%	42,875	44.09%	97,234
Bradford	6,884	49.88%	6,916	50.12%	13,800
Brevard	199,393	55.85%	157,592	44.15%	356,985
Broward	507,704	60.36%	333,392	39.64%	841,096
Calhoun	2,883	45.41%	3,466	54.59%	6,349
Charlotte	66,137	54.12%	56,066	45.88%	122,203
Citrus	51,611	53.3%	45,214	46.7%	96,825
Clay	65,416	52.45%	59,304	47.55%	124,720
Collier	98,993	47.11%	111,136	52.89%	210,129
Columbia	16,490	49.64%	16,730	50.36%	33,220
Desoto	6,081	49.96%	6,090	50.04%	12,171
Dixie	3,787	52.97%	4,266	52.97%	8,053
Duval	283,346	60.73%	183,250	39.27%	466,596
Escambia	90,818	56.36%	70,333	43.64%	161,151
Flagler	41,937	53.44%	36,541	46.56%	78,478
Franklin	3,692	55.13%	3,005	44.87%	6,697
Gadsden	13,921	63.87%	7,875	36.13%	21,796
Gilchrist	4,681	43.99%	5,960	56.01%	10,641
Glades	2,438	46.67%	2,786	53.33%	5,224
Gulf	4,397	50.97%	4,230	49.03%	8,627
Hamilton	2,783	49.38%	2,853	50.62%	5,636
Hardee	3,193	39.78%	4,833	60.22%	8,026
Hendry	6,451	49.2%	6,661	50.8%	13,112
Hernando	60,248	54.75%	49,785	45.25%	110,033
Highlands	24,023	47.14%	26,935	52.86%	50,958
Hillsborough	382,243	57.98%	277,062	42.02%	659,305
Holmes	3,570	39.46%	5,477	60.54%	9,047
Indian River	52,427	53.95%	44,749	46.05%	97,176
Jackson	10,551	47.99%	11,436	52.01%	21,987
Jefferson	4,228	49.92%	4,242	50.08%	8,470
Lafayette	1,388	37.24%	2,339	62.76%	3,727
Lake	115,617	52.04%	106,547	47.96%	222,164
Lee	205,597	53.92%	175,694	46.08%	381,291
Leon	101,249	64.79%	55,034	35.21%	156,283
Levy	12,120	50.22%	12,014	49.78%	24,134
Liberty	1,568	45.2%	1,901	54.8%	3,469
Madison	4,519	50.05%	4,510	49.95%	9,029
Manatee	123,672	54.73%	102,280	45.27%	225,952
Marion	109,781	52.41%	99,697	47.59%	209,478
Martin	52,732	54.09%	44,752	45.91%	97,484
Miami-Dade	510,124	49.26%	525,479	50.74%	1,035,603
Monroe	28,211	64.44%	15,571	35.56%	43,782
Nassau	32,286	49.88%	32,436	50.12%	64,722
Okaloosa	59,999	53.01%	53,185	46.99%	113,184
Okeechobee	8,083	50.84%	7,816	49.16%	15,899
Orange	359,206	60.8%	231,604	39.2%	590,810
Osceola	91,274	54.63%	75,811	45.37%	167,085
Palm Beach	433,345	59.44%	295,661	40.56%	729,006
Pasco	174,363	55.94%	137,316	44.06%	311,679
Pinellas	311,878	61.78%	192,937	38.22%	504,815
Polk	180,139	52.72%	161,556	47.28%	341,695
Putnam	19,275	53.51%	16,743	46.49%	36,018
Santa Rosa	56,744	50.87%	54,812	49.13%	111,556
Sarasota	154,426	56.53%	118,745	43.47%	273,171
Seminole	145,045	57.84%	105,711	42.16%	250,756
St. Johns	99,304	50.99%	95,464	49.01%	194,768
St. Lucie	107,583	58.99%	74,786	41.01%	182,369
Sumter	49,160	47.68%	53,947	52.32%	103,107
Suwannee	9,965	45.9%	11,744	54.1%	21,709
Taylor	4,964	50.55%	4,856	49.45%	9,820
Union	2,749	44.52%	3,426	55.48%	6,175
Volusia	172,634	56.55%	132,619	43.45%	305,253
Wakulla	10,476	53.01%	9,288	46.99%	19,764
Walton	23,945	48.58%	25,340	51.42%	49,285
Washington	5,751	45.88%	6,785	54.12%	12,536
Total	5,950,589	55.90%	4,693,524	44.10%	10,644,113

== Notes ==
Partisan clients

== See also ==
- 2024 Florida Amendment 4
- 2024 United States ballot measures
- List of 2024 United States cannabis reform proposals
