= Florida Chamber of Commerce =

The Florida Chamber of Commerce is an organization devoted to the advocacy of private businesses in the state of Florida.

This Chamber originated in 1912, and included its first continuing group in 1916, the Florida Tick Eradication Committee. As the group expanded and accepted new responsibilities, it became the Florida Development Board, then the Florida State Chamber of Commerce, before assuming its current name in 1975.

According to the Florida Chamber of Commerce, they have played a major role in the areas of taxation, transportation, right-to-work laws, tort reform, growth management, economic development, and international trade.

The Orlando Sentinel Editorial Board criticized the chamber as being nakedly politically biased.

In May 2020, The Chamber urged the governor to re-open the state from coronavirus lockdowns, advice which was incongruent with CDC Guidelines in safely reopening businesses that had been forced to close to protect Floridians' lives. Ron DeSantis declared, ‘I’m not singing their tune’ at a press conference on May 14. Then, the very next day, Governor DeSantis changed his tune at another press briefing. On May 15, he ordered a "full phase 1" reopening, and then the state moved to "Phase 2" on June 3, despite rising cases and deaths from the virus. "I mean ... go enjoy. Have a drink. It’s fine," DeSantis said."

This all happened at the same time Data Scientist, and Whistleblower Rebekah Jones was fired from her job for an email she sent on May 15th. She was tasked with managing the state's "Covid dashboard" which was recognized for being an excellent platform by national media. She was fired for refusing to manipulate data.

The current president and CEO of the Florida Chamber of Commerce is Mark Wilson.
