= Casey DeSantis =

First Lady of Florida since 2019

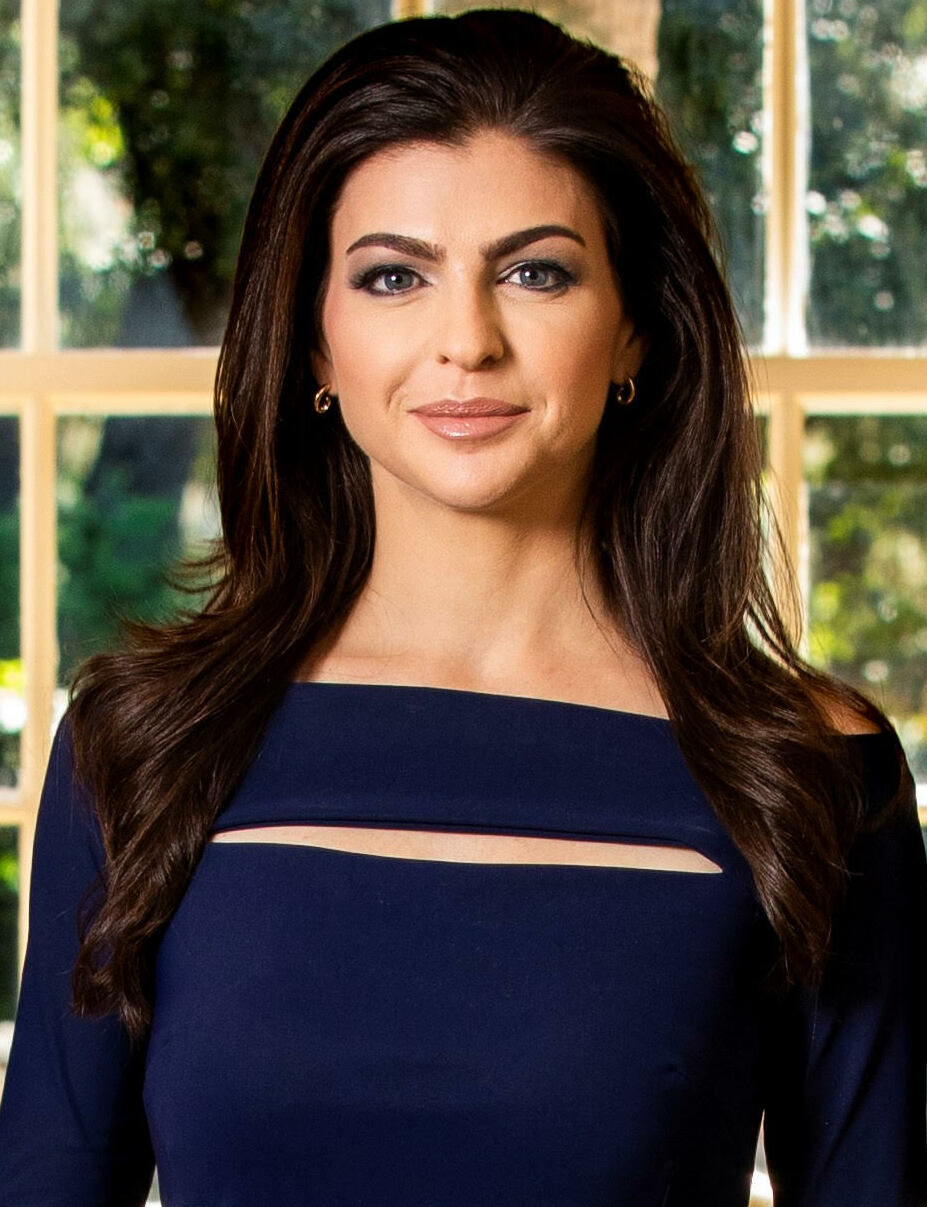
- Official portrait, 2019

First Lady of Florida
- Current
- Assumed role January 8, 2019
- Governor: Ron DeSantis
- Preceded by: Ann Scott

Personal details
- Born: Jill Casey Black; June 26, 1980 (age 46) Columbus, Ohio, U.S.
- Party: Republican
- Spouse: Ron DeSantis (m. 2009)
- Children: 3
- Education: College of Charleston (BS)

Jill Casey DeSantis (née Black; born June 26, 1980) is an American former news journalist who has been the first lady of Florida since 2019, as the wife of Governor Ron DeSantis.

Born and raised in Ohio, DeSantis graduated from the College of Charleston, where she competed on the equestrian team. In 2009, she married Ron DeSantis and became a local news broadcaster in Jacksonville. After her husband's victory in 2018, she ended her media career upon becoming the first lady. In 2025, DeSantis became embroiled in the Hope Florida scandal and was investigated by the Republican-controlled Florida Legislature. Since May 2025, she has been under criminal investigation by the Second Judicial Circuit State Attorney's Office.

== Early life and education ==
Jill Casey Black was born on June 26, 1980, in Columbus, Ohio, the second child of Robert Black, an optometrist and former officer in the United States Air Force, and Jeanne Caponigro, a speech-language pathologist and the daughter of a Sicilian immigrant.

Black graduated from Troy High School in Troy, Ohio, in 1999. She graduated from the College of Charleston, where she received a Bachelor of Science in economics with a minor in French. She competed on its equestrian team.

== Media career ==
Early in her career, DeSantis hosted the Golf Channel programs On The Tee and PGA Tour Today. She was also a local newscaster and anchor for WJXT, in Jacksonville, Florida. She held several positions there, including general assignment reporter, morning anchor, and police reporter.

In 2014, DeSantis was a creator-moderator for The Chat, an hour-long round table panel discussion talk show that aired on Tegna's Jacksonville stations WTLV (NBC) and WJXX (ABC). She hosted the daily local talk show First Coast Living as well as the weekly The American Dream program about entrepreneurs. DeSantis wrote and produced the television documentary Champion, The JT Townsend Story about high school football player J.T. Townsend. She also won a regional Suncoast Emmy Award.

In 2018, Florida Politics called Casey "one of the most recognizable faces on Jacksonville television, with long runs at two local news operations".

== First Lady of Florida (2019–present) ==
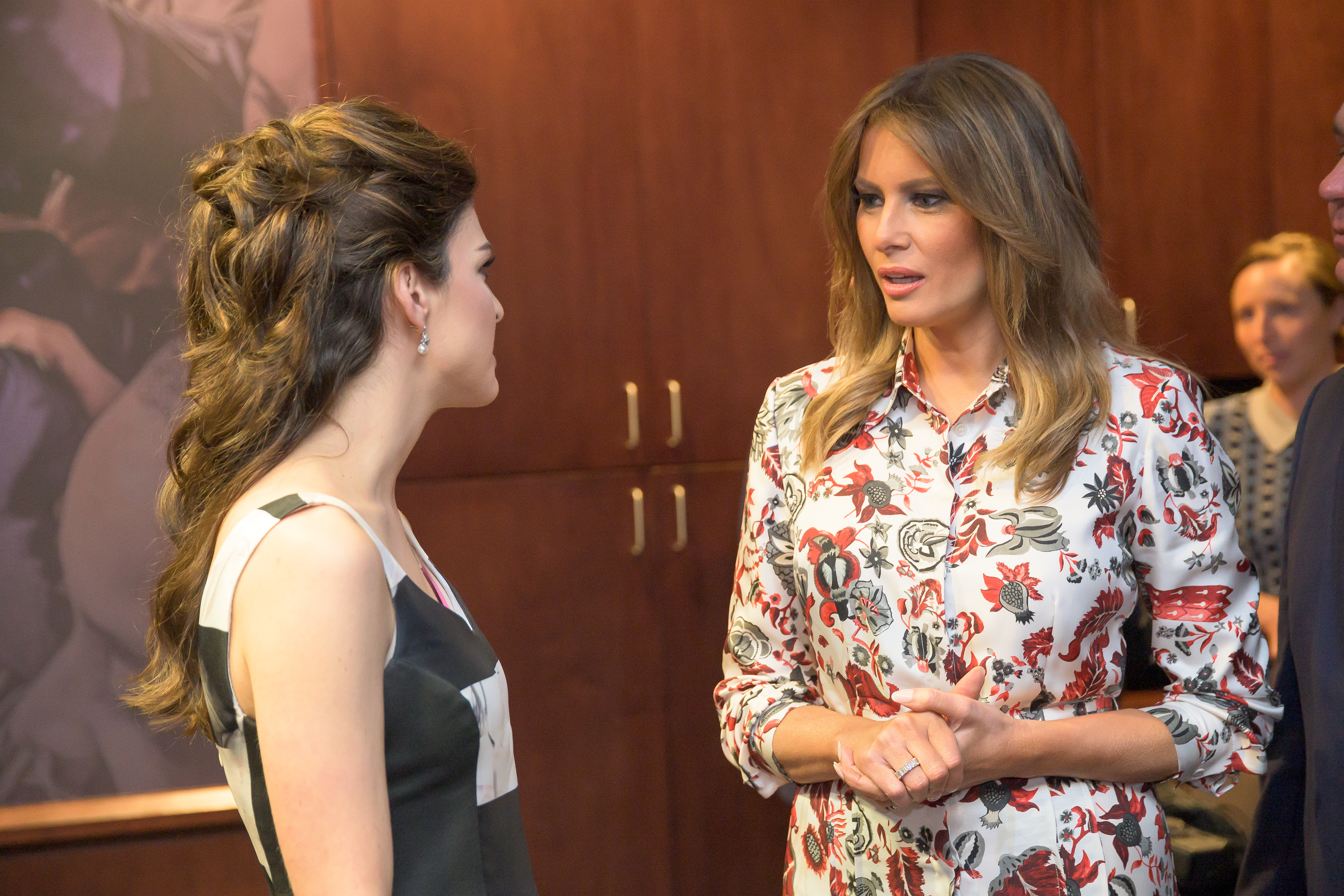
DeSantis (left) and Melania Trump, 2019

Desantis became first lady of Florida on January 8, 2019, when her husband, Ron DeSantis, became the 46th governor of Florida.

In February 2019, DeSantis established the First Lady's Medal for Courage, Commitment, and Service. Soon after, she announced Florida's 2019 Black History Month theme as "Celebrating Public Service" where she and the governor honored the winners of Florida's Black History Month student contests and Excellence in Education Award recipients at the Governor's Mansion. DeSantis recognized Mary Ann Carroll, the only female member of the Highwaymen, as Florida's featured artist for the month.

DeSantis participated in a Recovery Redfish Release to address the impacts of red tide. "I've heard from those throughout Florida who understand that our water must be safe for our families, visitors and economy." DeSantis has hosted listening sessions on Venezuela, hurricane relief, and mental health.

In August 2019, DeSantis presided over the first meeting of the Florida Children and Youth Cabinet as its chair. During the COVID-19 pandemic, she and her husband held a roundtable in August 2020 centered on the mental health impact of the pandemic.

According to Politico, DeSantis has taken on a "sort of policy portfolio of her own that ranges from hurricane recovery to issues of mental health" in her role as First Lady.

=== Hope Florida scandal ===
In 2021, DeSantis founded Hope Florida, a charity to connect underprivileged Floridians with government resources, nonprofits, the private sector and religious organizations. In early 2025, the Florida House of Representatives launched an investigation into Hope Florida, in particular a transaction in which the foundation received $10 million of the $67 million legal settlement between Centene and Florida Agency for Health Care Administration. Hope Florida diverted the settlement proceeds to Secure Florida's Future and Save our Society from Drugs. These nonprofits then made contributions to Keep Florida Clean, a political committee with ties to DeSantis' husband. Hope Florida's chairman admitted mistakes and "lapses in reporting procedures", including missing federal tax reports. The House halted its investigation on April 24 after Hope Florida and the nonprofits refused to continue cooperating.

On May 20, 2025, State Attorney Jack Campbell of the Second Judicial Circuit Court opened a criminal investigation into the controversy.

== Political activity ==
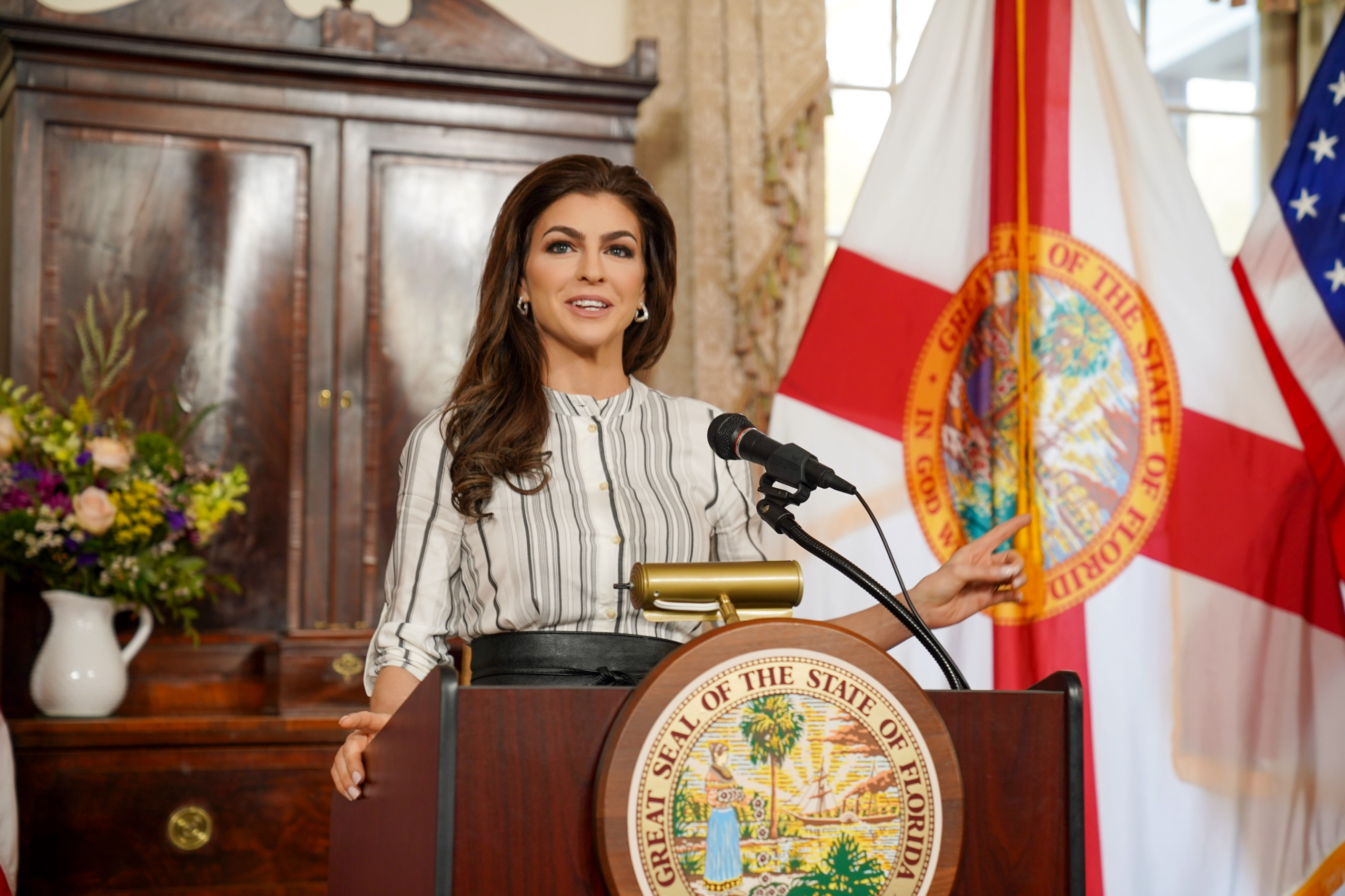
DeSantis delivering a speech, 2023

In 2023, Casey DeSantis was honored by the Republican Party of Sarasota as "Stateswoman of the Year", an award that had been earned in the past by individuals including her husband, Ron DeSantis, and other national officeholders. She became the first woman to receive the distinction.

=== Ron DeSantis 2024 presidential campaign ===
DeSantis was an advisor to her husband's 2024 presidential campaign. The New York Times has noted her role in advising her husband on media strategy and policy matters. In December 2023, she was criticized for telling Republicans nationwide to participate in the Iowa caucus.

=== Potential political future ===
After receiving the Stateswoman of the Year award, speculation surrounding a potential bid by Casey DeSantis in Florida's 2026 gubernatorial election has emerged. However, Puck reported that a spokesperson for the DeSantis campaign denied her interest in running for office.

In 2025, press reports speculated DeSantis was considered to fill the vacancy of Lieutenant Governor of Florida after the resignation of Jeanette Nuñez.

== Personal life ==
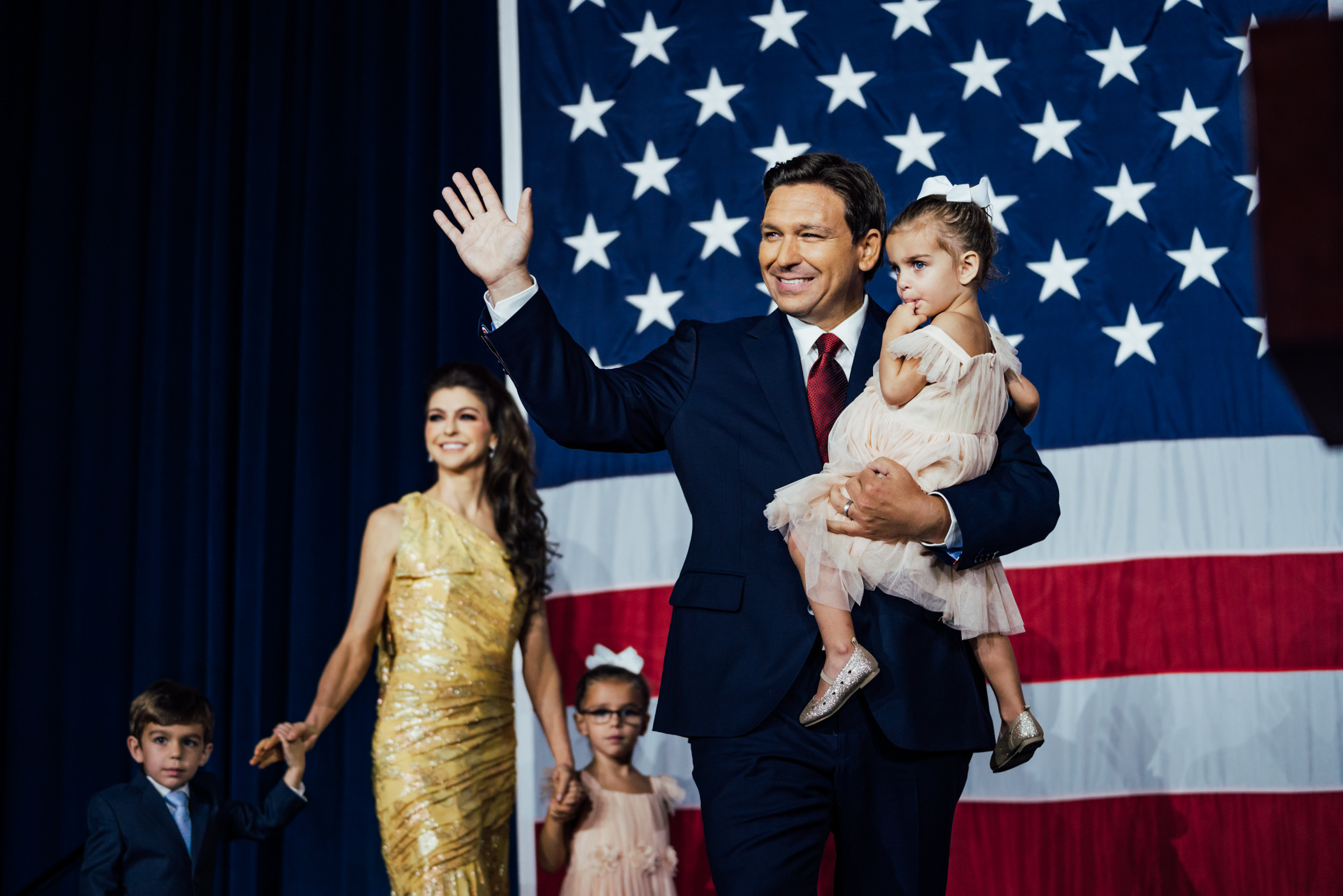
DeSantis family, 2022

She met Ron DeSantis, then a naval officer at Naval Station Mayport, on a golf course at the University of North Florida. They married on September 26, 2009, at Walt Disney World Resort, which Ron DeSantis later called "kind of ironic" in the wake of his battle with the company over the Florida Parental Rights in Education Act. They have three children together: two daughters and a son.

On October 4, 2021, her husband announced that she had been diagnosed with breast cancer. On March 3, 2022, she announced that she was cancer-free.

Like her husband, DeSantis is Roman Catholic.
