= Jack Campbell (politician) =

American prosecutor and politician

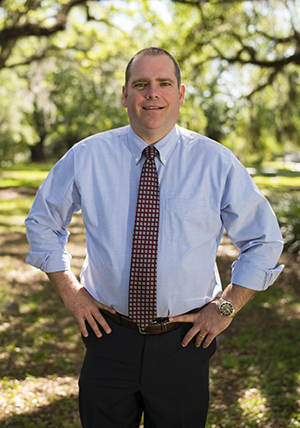

State Attorney of the Second Judicial Circuit of Florida
- Incumbent
- Assumed office January 3, 2017
- Preceded by: Willie Meggs

Personal details
- Born: John Emmett Campbell; 1972 or 1973 (age 52–53)
- Party: Democratic
- Education: Florida State University (BA); Samford University (JD)

John Emmett Campbell (born 1972 or 1973) is an American prosecutor and politician who has served as State Attorney of the Second Judicial Circuit of Florida since 2017. He is a member of the Democratic Party.

== Early life and education ==
Campbell earned his bachelor's degree from Florida State University. He graduated from Cumberland School of Law in 2001.

== Career ==
Campbell was admitted to The Florida Bar in 2002. Prior to his election, he served as a special assistant U.S. attorney for the Northern District of Florida, as an assistant state attorney for the Second Judicial Circuit, and as the chief felony trial attorney of the Second Judicial Circuit Court.

On November 8, 2016, Campbell was elected state attorney of the Second Judicial Circuit of Florida, succeeding Willie Meggs. He was re-elected unopposed in 2020 and 2024.

Campbell is seeking the death penalty for the alleged perpetrator of the 2025 Florida State University shooting.

=== Hope Florida scandal ===
On May 20, 2025, Campbell opened a criminal investigation into accusations of money laundering and wire fraud allegedly committed by Governor Ron DeSantis, Casey DeSantis, and James Uthmeier. In a statement to the press, Campbell said: "As for (an) investigation, the only source of information I have received is from members of the press," and "The Florida Legislature has many good lawyers including some former prosecutors. I am sure they would refer any evidence of crimes to me if they found them."

== Personal life ==
Campbell lives in Leon County, Florida.

== See also ==
- Andrew H. Warren
- Dave Aronberg
- Monique Worrell
