= Demetrius Jifunza =

Leader Florida Civil Liberties, Voter Rights for Felons

Founder, Sarasota Chapter Florida Rights Restoration Coalition

Vice president, Sarasota Chapter NAACP

Personal details
- Born: Demetrius Smart; 1977 (age 47–48); Florida, U.S.
- Education: (BA)
- Occupation: Paralegal, activist, pastor
- Known for: Voter rights activism

Demetrius Jifunza (born 1977) is an American Christian Methodist Episcopal pastor and activist who is among the most visible spokespersons and leaders in the felony disenfranchisement, Voting Rights Restoration for Felons Initiative.

Born in Florida, Jifunza, whose birth name was Demetrius Smart, is best known for advancing the awareness and subsequent passing of Florida Amendment 4.

This amendment to the Constitution of Florida passed by ballot initiative on November 6, 2018, as part of the 2018 Florida elections. The proposition restored the voting rights of Floridians with felony convictions after they complete all terms of their sentence including parole or probation.

== Education, professional and personal life ==
Jifunza was born on 1977, and grew up with a supportive family in Sarasota, Florida. His given name at birth was Demetrius Smarts, but, after a period of gradual transition, he changed his name, which was also adopted by his wife, to his Swahili surname, Jifunza.

In 1997, Jifunza was arrested for armed robbery. He was living in Polk County, Florida, and says he drove a car with friends who had not told him they were planning to commit a crime. Regarding the arrest, Jifunza accepts what he did was wrong and said, "Since I was there, I take responsibility..." Between 1996 and 1999, he spent almost three years in prison and in 2003, served eight months more after violating his probation.

Jifunza is a Christian Methodist Episcopal pastor, career paralegal, serves as vice president of the Sarasota chapter of the NAACP, and is pursuing a master's degree in clinical mental health counseling at Argosy University.

He founded the Sarasota Chapter of the Florida Rights Restoration Coalition in 2017 and, in 2018, became the vice president of the Sarasota Chapter of the NAACP, helping to bring Florida Amendment 4 to national platforms. He is a pastor, paralegal, father of three children and husband.

=== Activism ===
Jifunza became a leading voice in the felony disenfranchisement awareness movement to amendment to the Constitution of Florida, appearing on national media platforms such PBS and HBO, in podcasts and major news sources.

=== Media ===
Jifunza's television and media campaign helped to elevate felony disenfranchisement to a level of national debate. Ultimately, Amendment 4 was passed by ballot initiative on November 6, 2018, as part of the 2018 Florida elections.
