= Dekker v. Weida =

2023 U.S. District Court decision on transgender medical care

- Court: U.S. District Court for the Northern District of Florida
- Decided: June 21, 2023
- Citation: 679 F.Supp.3d 1271 (N.D. Fla. 2023)

Case opinions
- Decision by: Judge Robert L. Hinkle

Dekker v. Weida, 679 F.Supp.3d 1271 (N.D. Fla. 2023), was a decision by the U.S. District Court for the Northern District of Florida ruling that Florida's prohibition of transgender medical care for Medicaid beneficiaries was unconstitutional and violated the federal Medicaid statute and Affordable Care Act.

== Factual background ==
On August 21, 2022, the Florida Agency for Health Care Administration (AHCA), which has oversight over Florida’s Medicaid Program, adopted a rule denying Medicaid coverage for evidence-based medical care for transgender people in Florida. This type of medical care had been covered by Florida Medicaid. In 2022, four plaintiffs, including August Dekker, commenced a lawsuit against the AHCA and AHCA’s Secretary, Jason Weida, in the U.S. District Court for the Northern District of Florida.

== Decision ==
After a two-week trial, in June 2023, the court ruled that Florida’s prohibition on Medicaid coverage for treatment of gender dysphoria for transgender individuals in Florida was unlawful and unconstitutional. The ruling also nullified the section of the transgender health care ban, SB 254, that also banned state funding for Medicaid coverage of gender-affirming health care.
