= Mi Vecino =

Voter registration organization

- Founders: Devon Murphy-Anderson; Alejandro Berrios
- Type: Nonprofit
- Legal status: Foundation
- Purpose: Encourage voter registration in Latino communities
- Headquarters: Florida, U.S.
- Region served: United States
- Website: www.mivecinoflorida.com

Mi Vecino is a non-profit voter registration organization based in Florida.

Mi Vecino actively encourages voter registration in Latino communities. They are Florida's first year round voter registration organization.

== History ==
Mi Vecino was founded by Devon Murphy-Anderson and Alejandro Berrios. Mi Vecino is a Spanish-language word which literally means "My Neighbor".

Mi Vecino co-founder, Devon Murphy-Anderson, has previously served as part of the senior staff of the Florida Democratic Party, while Alejandro Berrios, a Floridian of Puerto Rican and Cuban descent, has served as regional field director for Joe Biden's presidential campaign, as the Palm Beach County Democratic Executive Committee's Acting Chairman and the Florida Democratic Party Campaign Director.

In May 2021, Florida Senate Bill 90 was passed. Mi Vecino has criticized the bill as new requirements imposed would hinder vote registration of people of color. In the same month, Mi Vecino opened offices in the I-4 corridor, where almost half of Puerto Ricans of Florida are based.

Mi Vecino plans to spend at least $2.3 million in the next midterm cycle and register at least thirty thousands voters per year, mostly from Hispanic populated areas. As of 2022, they have raised $1.5 million for their program in the disenfranchised communities of Florida.
