= Health department =

Governmental agency

A health department or health ministry is a part of government which focuses on issues related to the general health of the citizenry. Subnational entities, such as states, counties and cities, often also operate a health department of their own. Health departments perform food inspections and other health related inspections (the person who performs this job is often called a public health inspector), vaccination programs, free STD and HIV tests, tobacco enforcement and cessation programs, and other medical assistance programs. Health departments also compile statistics about health issues within their area. The role of a health department may vary from one country to the other, but their primary objective is always the same; safeguarding and promoting health. In 1986, several of the world's national health departments met to establish an international guideline by which health departments operate. The meeting was in Ottawa, Ontario, Canada, and hence the guidelines established are known as the Ottawa Charter. The Ottawa Charter was designed to 'achieve Health for All'.

"Health department" can also refer to a university health department.

== Around the world ==
Most executive governments in the world are divided into departments or ministries. In Canada, Health Canada is the federal agency in charge of healthcare. The first ministry of health in Canada was established by legislation in the province of New Brunswick in 1918, making it the first cabinet-level Department of Health in the British Empire, with Dr. William F. Roberts of Saint John, N.B. as the first Minister of Health in the British Empire.

In the People's Republic of China, the China Health Ministry initially oversaw healthcare before it was dissolved. The majority of its functions have now been integrated into a new agency called the National Health Commission. In Nigeria, the Federal Ministry of Health supervises the country's health departments and agencies under it, most of which are located in Abuja, the country's capital.

== United States Health Departments ==
=== Programs and services ===
In the United States, the Department of Health and Human Services is responsible for coordinating health programs in the country. With more than 100 programs and services, the United States Department of Health and Human Services (HHS) aims to "protect the health of all Americans and provide essential human services, especially for those who are least able to help themselves." These federal programs consist of social service programs, civil rights and healthcare privacy programs, disaster preparedness programs, and health related research. HHS offers a variety of social service programs geared toward persons with low income, disabilities, military families, and senior citizens. Healthcare rights are defined under HHS in the Health Insurance Portability and Accountability Act (HIPAA) which protect patient's privacy in regards to medical information. HHS collaborates with the Office of the Assistant Secretary for Preparedness and Response and Office of Emergency Management to prepare and respond to health emergencies. A broad array of health related research is supported or completed under the HHS; secondarily under HHS, the Health Resources & Service Administration houses data warehouses and makes health data available surrounding a multitude of topics. HHS also has vast offering of health related resources and tools. Some examples of available resources include disease prevention, wellness, health insurance information, as well as links to healthcare providers and facilities, meaningful health related materials, and public health and safety information.

=== Health departments in the United States ===
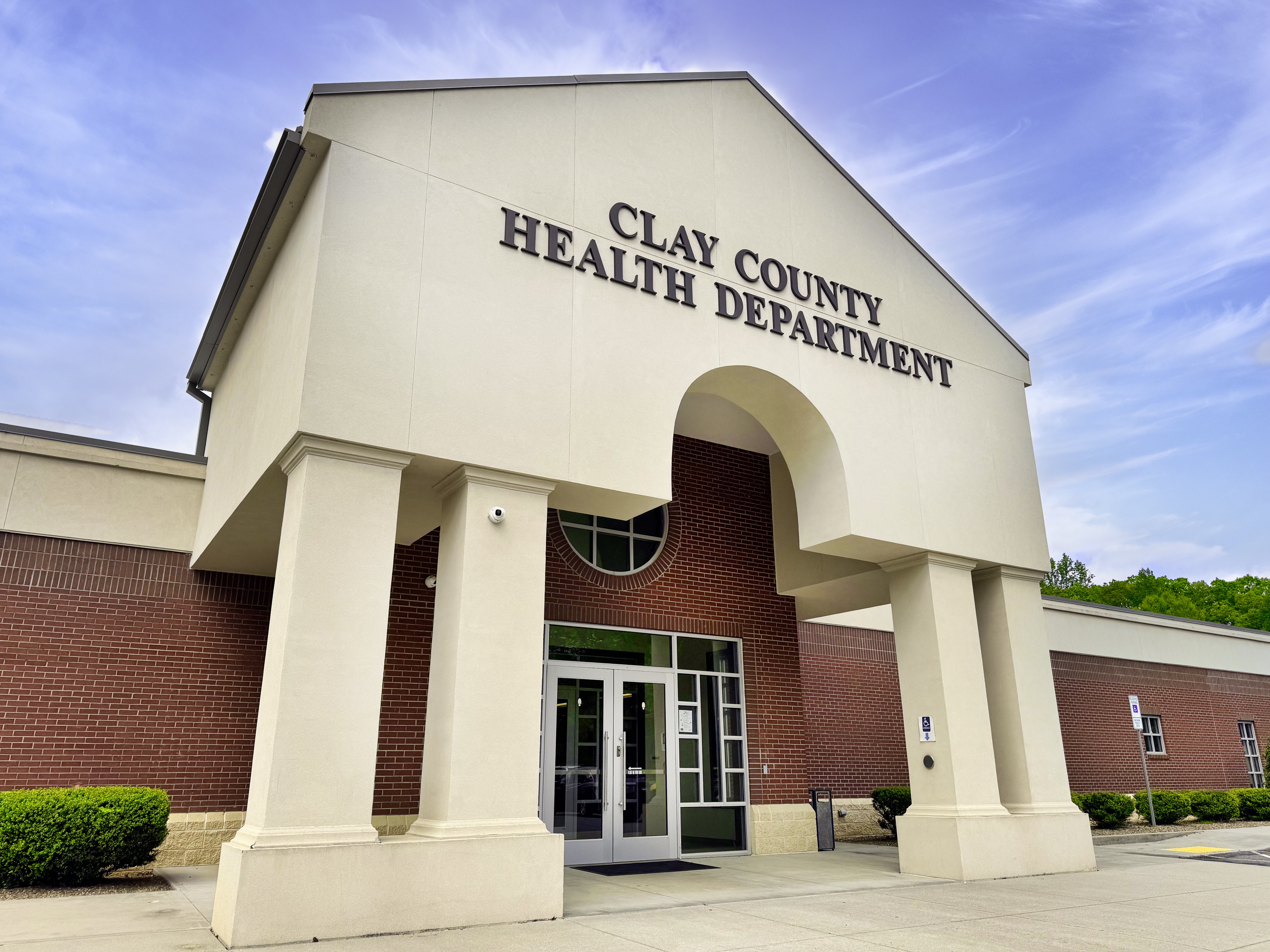
A local county health department in North Carolina

There are several tiers of health departments in America: federal, state, tribal, insular areas, freely associated states, and local levels. In relation with state and local government, the federal government provides states with funding to ensure that states are able to retain current programs and are able to implement new programs. The coordination between all three levels is critical to ensure the programs being implemented are well structured for each level. The health department at state level needs to safeguard good relations with legislators as well as governors in order to acquire legal and financial aid to guarantee the development and enhancements of the programs. Assemblies are set up to guide the relationships between state and local health departments. The state sets up the regulations and health policies whereas the local health departments are the ones implementing the health policies and services.

==== List of Public Health departments in the United States ====
===== Federal =====
- Department of Health and Human Services (HHS, renamed in 1980 from the Department of Health, Education, and Welfare (HEW))

===== State =====
- Alabama Department of Public Health (ADPH)
- Alaska Department of Health and Social Services (ADHSS)
- Arizona Department of Health Services (ADHS)
- Arkansas Department of Health (ADH)
- California Department of Public Health (CDPH)
- Colorado Department of Public Health and Environment (CDPHE)
- Connecticut State Department of Public Health (CSDPH)
- Delaware Division of Public Health (DDPH)
- District of Columbia Department of Health (DCDH)
- Florida Department of Health (FDH)
- Georgia Department of Public Health (GDPH)
- Hawaii State Department of Health (HSDH)
- Idaho Department of Health and Welfare (IDHW)
- Illinois Department of Public Health (IDPH)
- Indiana State Department of Health (ISDH)
- Iowa Department of Public Health (IDPH)
- Kansas Department of Health and Environment (KDHE)
- Kentucky Department for Public Health (KDPH)
- Louisiana Department of Health (LDH)
- Maine Department of Health and Human Services (MDHHS)
- Maryland Department of Health (MDH)
- Massachusetts Department of Public Health (MDPH)
- Michigan Department of Health and Human Services (MDHHS)
- Minnesota Department of Health (MDH)
- Mississippi State Department of Health (MSDH)
- Missouri Department of Health and Senior Services (MDHSS)
- Montana Department of Public Health and Human Services (MDPHHS)
- Nebraska Department of Health and Human Services (NDHHS)
- Nevada Division of Public and Behavioral Health (NDPBH)
- New Hampshire Department of Health and Human Services (NHDHHS)
- New Jersey Department of Health (NJDH)
- New Mexico Department of Health (NMDH)
- New York State Department of Health (NYSDH)
- North Carolina Department of Health and Human Services (NCDHHS)
- North Dakota Department of Health (NDDH)
- Ohio Department of Health (ODH)
- Oklahoma State Department of Health (OSDH)
- Oregon Health Authority, Public Health Division (OHA)
- Pennsylvania Department of Health (PDH)
- Rhode Island Department of Health (RIDH)
- South Carolina Department of Health and Environmental Control (SCDHEC)
- South Dakota Department of Health (SDDH)
- Tennessee Department of Health (TDH)
- Texas Department of State Health Services (TDSHS)
- Utah Department of Health (UDH)
- Vermont Department of Health (VDH)
- Virginia Department of Health (VDH)
- Washington State Department of Health (WSDH)
- West Virginia Department of Health and Human Resources, Bureau for Public Health (WVDHHR)
- Wisconsin Department of Health Services (WDHS)
- Wyoming Department of Health (WDH)

===== Tribal =====
- Indian Health Service (IHS)
- Navajo Nation Department of Health (NNDH)

===== Insular areas =====
- American Samoa Government Department of Human and Social Services
- Commonwealth of the Northern Mariana Islands, Commonwealth Health Corporation
- Guam Department of Public Health and Social Services, Division of Public Health
- Puerto Rico Department of Health (Departamento de Salud, Gobierno de Puerto Rico)
- US Virgin Islands Department of Health

===== Freely associated states =====
- Republic of the Marshall Islands Ministry of Health and Human Services
- Federated States of Micronesia Department of Health and Social Affairs
- Republic of Palau Ministry of Health

===== Local =====
- Chicago Department of Public Health (CDPH)
- Long Beach (California) Department of Health and Human Services
- New York City Department of Health and Mental Hygiene (NYCDHMH)
- Pasadena (California) Public Health Department
- San Francisco Department of Health

=== Grants and contracts ===
The United States Department of Health and Human Services (HHS) acts as the most extensive grant funding agency in the country. While several grants are delivered to non-government agencies, the majority of HHS federal grants are administered to states, territories, and tribes. Beneficiaries of federal funds are prohibited from lobbying government officials for legislative influence or additional funding. HHS and the National Institutes of Health, are accountable to Congress for conducting research that is amenable to both federal and state regulatory policies and a cost-effective budget. HHS uses grants to finance and encourage government research interests. Additionally, HHS routinely sets fixed price and cost reimbursement contracts with private companies in order to obtain products and services for government operations. HHS aims to issue these contracts with adherence to federal contract laws, HHS acquisition policies, and local operating procedures.

== United States approach to laws and regulations affecting local, state, and federal health departments ==
=== History ===
There is some dispute at the local level as to the claim of being the first to establish a local board or health department. For example, The city of Petersburg, Virginia claims it established the first permanent board of health in 1780; The city of Baltimore, Maryland claims it is established the first US health department in 1793, Philadelphia, Pennsylvania followed 1794, claiming its Board of Health as "one of the first"; and Boston, Massachusetts claims in 1799 it established the first board of health and the first health department, with Paul Revere named as the first health officer.

At the state level, Louisiana was the first state to create a state board of health in 1855, but it functioned primarily to influence regulations in New Orleans. Massachusetts was the first to establish a state board that functioned throughout its state with statewide authority in 1869.

At the national level, a simple National Board of Health functioned from 1879 to 1883, but it was not until 1939 that another federal agency that operated to manage public health on a national level was established, going from a federal agency called the Federal Security Agency that had health functions such as the United States Public Health Service (PHS), and the United States Food and Drug Administration (FDA). In 1953, that agency was reorganized and its health functions were elevated to a cabinet-level position to establish the United States Department of Health, Education and Welfare (HEW), which was renamed in 1980 to become the current and modern United States Department of Health and Human Services (HHS).

==== Current laws and regulations at each level of government ====
HHS notes the laws and regulations that it carries out on its website. Every state also has a health department to which HHS has given a description and hyperlink for each state health department.

Other levels of government within each state are varied. For example, the California Department of Public Health (CDPH) has within it a health department in each of its 58 counties. However, other localized versions exist. In the consolidated city and county of San Francisco, the San Francisco Department of Health serves both the municipal corporation (city) and the administrative division (county) of the state. Three cities within California operate their own health departments, while simultaneously being under the jurisdiction of their county's health department. In Alameda County, the City of Berkeley operates its own Public Health Division. Similarly, in Los Angeles County, the Long Beach Department of Health and Human Services and the Pasadena Public Health Department serve the cities of Long Beach and Pasadena, respectively.

== See also ==
- Health minister
- Health board (disambiguation)
- History of public health in the United States
