= Weida =

Weida can refer to the following:

- Jason Weida, American lawyer and government official
- Weida (Salza), the name of a section of the Salza, a river of Saxony-Anhalt, Germany
- Weida, Thuringia, a town in Thuringia, Germany
- Weida (White Elster), a river of Thuringia, Germany, tributary of the White Elster
- Weida-Land, a Verwaltungsgemeinschaft in Saxony-Anhalt, Germany
