= Desmond Meade =

American voting rights activist (born 1967)

- Education: Florida International University College of Law, Miami Dade College
- Occupations: Executive Director, Florida Rights Restoration Coalition
- Known for: Voting Rights
- Spouse: Sheena Meade
- Children: Xandre, Xavier, Xzion, Xcellence, Nathan
- Awards: MacArthur Prize 2021; Time 100 2019 - 100 Most Influential People in the World; Doctor of Humane Letters, Bard College; Orlando Sentinel Central Floridian of the Year 2018
- Website: Official Website

Desmond Meade (born July 22, 1967) is a voting rights activist and Executive Director of the Florida Rights Restoration Coalition. As chair of Floridians for a Fair Democracy, Meade led the successful effort to pass Florida Amendment 4, a 2018 state initiative that restored voting rights to over 1.4 million Floridians with previous felony convictions. In April 2019, Time magazine named Meade as one of the 100 most influential people in the world. Meade's autobiography Let My People Vote: My Battle to Restore the Civil Rights of Returning Citizens was published in 2020; in 2021 he was awarded a MacArthur "Genius Grant."

== Early life and education ==
According to The New York Times, Meade "was born in St. Croix and moved to Miami with his parents when he was 5. His mother worked as a waitress, and his father was a mechanic." He graduated from high school in 1985, then joined the Army as a helicopter mechanic. While in the Army, he began using cocaine, a habit that escalated over the years. In 1990, he faced an Army court martial for stealing from the base; after a three year sentence, he was given a dishonorable discharge.

In civilian life, Meade's drug problem continued. He served time in jail for felony drug possession, and after a fight with his brother was convicted of aggravated battery, also a felony.

In 2001, he was convicted of possession of a firearm as a felon and sentenced to 15 years in prison. (According to Meade, the gun was in the cupboard of the house where he was staying, and belonged to the owner of the house, not to him, but police gave evidence that they found Meade holding the gun in his hand.) In 2004, however, an appeals court reversed his conviction and he was released.

In 2005, after having considered suicide, Meade checked himself into a drug treatment program and began to rebuild his life. He enrolled in Miami-Dade College while living in a homeless shelter, graduating in 2010 with the school's highest honors.

Meade then enrolled in Florida International University College of Law, the only public law school in south Florida, graduating in 2013. Meade, who had done volunteer work for rights restoration during his years at Miami Dade, joined the Florida Rights Restoration Coalition while he was in law school.

== Activism ==
=== Campaign for Voting Restoration Amendment ===
Florida as of 2018 was one of only three US states to deny voting rights to anyone with a felony record. Because felon disenfranchisement is part of Florida's Constitution, which requires a 60% vote to modify, many efforts to restore voting rights to former convicts had been unsuccessful.

In 2009, Meade became the head of the Florida Rights Restoration Coalition (FRRC), a group aimed at restoring civil rights to felons in Florida who had completed their sentences and probation. Meade described his goal as politically non-partisan, and worked closely with Republicans including former GOP lobbyist Neil Volz, who had spent time in prison in connection with Jack Abramoff.

Starting in 2015, Meade led Floridians for Fair Democracy in a drive to qualify the "Voting Restoration Amendment" as a ballot initiative for the 2018 Florida elections, collecting 799,000 signatures. The initiative was approved in January 2018 for the November ballot. Ultimately, the amendment passed, as Florida Amendment 4, with 64.55% of the vote. On January 8, 2019, an estimated 1.4 million ex-felons became eligible to vote.

=== Restrictions on Amendment 4 ===
Republican lawmakers in Florida responded to Amendment 4 by passing a new law (SB 7066), disqualifying from voting any felons who had unpaid fines or legal judgments against them. As a result, more than half of the 1.4 million felon voters were again disqualified. On appeal, the new law was overturned in May, 2020, by U.S. District Judge Robert Hinkle, who ruled that the 24th Amendment prohibits Florida from conditioning voting on payment of fines and fees.

Florida Governor Ron DeSantis appealed Hinkle's injunction to the 11th Circuit Court, which, in September, 2020, overturned the injunction by a 6-4 margin, with the majority holding that "requirement that felons pay all financial obligations before voting does not violate their due process rights or impose a poll tax."

According to the MacArthur Foundation, the FRRC (of which Meade is executive director) "is helping people find the information they need to meet the requirements [of SB 7066] .. and providing financial assistance to meet outstanding financial obligations. Meade and FRRC are also working on a series of criminal justice reform initiatives, including bail reform and re-entry programs, and finding ways to open access to housing and employment opportunities for returning citizens. " The FRRC raised $28M for people with past felony convictions in Florida who needed to pay fines and fees before they could vote; the obligations of over 44,000 returning citizens were paid before the November 2020 election.

=== Appeal for full civil rights restoration and pardon ===
Although Meade graduated from law school in 2013, Florida law prevents him (or anyone with a past felony conviction) from being admitted to the Florida Bar. Amendment 4 restored voting rights, but not other civil rights, such as the right to run for office or to sit for Florida's bar examination (required for practicing law in Florida.)

Meade sought to regain his civil rights, appealing to Florida's clemency board and also asking for a pardon. The clemency process in Florida was made more restrictive by former Florida Governor Rick Scott, according to CBS News, so that the board "has discretion to deny clemency for any reason, mandates that applicants wait at least five years before starting the process, and are given just five minutes to speak in a hearing."

At a clemency board hearing on September 23, 2020, Florida Governor Ron DeSantis denied Meade the pardon he would need to regain these civil rights. He also stated that Meade was not eligible to have his civil rights restored because he had applied for a pardon.

Florida Secretary of Agriculture Nikki Fried, the only Democrat on the clemency board, and the only board member who voted to restore Meade's civil rights, said that, during the two years of DeSantis's governorship, the board had approved only 30 requests from thousands of applications and called the Florida clemency system "broken." DeSantis, who as governor has veto power over pardons or restorations of civil rights, cited Meade's 1990 dishonorable discharge from the Army as a reason to withhold clemency, saying that Meade could reapply if he cleared up questions about it.

Meade reapplied and was again rejected by DeSantis in March, 2021, who again cited his 1990 military court martial, saying "As a former military officer, a dishonorable discharge is the highest punishment that a court martial may render. I consider it very serious."

=== Autobiography ===
Meade's autobiography Let My People Vote: My Battle to Restore the Civil Rights of Returning Citizens was published in 2020 by Beacon Press. NPR called it "a compelling story." Publishers Weekly said that Meade "does a skillful job taking readers through the blow-by-blow of the campaign, including the process of writing the actual text of the referendum, and makes a persuasive case that restoring the civil rights of ex-felons will lower rates of recidivism."

== Personal life ==
In December 2012, Meade married his wife Sheena, a labor activist and the mother of five children, whom he has adopted. They live in Orlando, Florida.

== Recognition ==
- Time 100 Most Influential People in 2019
- Fast Company 100 Most Creative People 2019
- Orlando Sentinel 2019 Central Floridian of the Year
- University of Florida's Bob Graham Center for Public Service's 2019 Floridian of the Year
- Miami Dade College Alumni Hall of Fame
- 2021 MacArthur Fellowship
- Honorary Doctorate of Humane Letters from Bard College

In June 2020, Meade was featured in a RepresentUs video focused on highlighting problems with America's criminal justice system.
