= Mary Mayhew =

American politician (born 1965)

Secretary of the Agency for Health Care Administration
- In office January 8, 2019 – September 8, 2020
- Governor: Ron DeSantis
- Preceded by: Justin Senior
- Succeeded by: Shevaun Harris (acting)

Commissioner of Maine Department of Health and Human Services
- In office 2011–2017
- Governor: Paul LePage

Personal details
- Born: 1965 (age 60–61)
- Party: Democratic (Before 1990s); Republican (1990s–present)
- Education: University of Arkansas (BA)

Mary Mayhew (born 1965) is an American politician and lobbyist who served as commissioner of the Maine Department of Health and Human Services. A lobbyist for hospitals prior to her appointment as commissioner by Republican Governor Paul LePage, Mayhew spent more than six years pursuing conservative welfare policies.

== Early life and education ==
Mayhew grew up in Pittsfield and China, Maine. Her mother worked as a nurse's aide, and her father was a foreman at a local manufacturing company. He also was chairman of the school board and a community leader. At 14, her family moved to Paragould, Arkansas, to be near her mother's aging parents.

At 17, she moved to Washington, D.C. to become a Congressional page and finish high school. Her graduation included a reception with President Ronald Reagan in the White House Rose Garden. She then enrolled at the University of Arkansas, earning a bachelor's degree in political science. Her father died when she was 19.

== Career ==
Mayhew served as a legislative assistant in Washington, D.C. for Bill Alexander and then worked as a manager of state government relations for Equifax in Atlanta. She moved back to Maine in 1990 and worked as Patrick K. McGowan's congressional campaign manager.

She was a partner in the public affairs firm of Hawkes & Mayhew, based in Augusta. Mayhew worked for 11 years as vice president of the Maine Hospital Association before joining the Paul LePage administration as senior health policy advisor. She was later chosen to be the commissioner of the Maine Department of Health and Human Services. Upon her nomination for the position, she changed her party registration from the Democratic to Republican.

=== 2018 Maine gubernatorial campaign ===
In May 2017, Mayhew resigned from her position in the LePage administration. Two weeks later, Mayhew announced her campaign for the Republican nomination for governor. Mayhew was described as "a leading Republican candidate" in a New York Times opinion piece about Maine's ranked-choice voting system, but placed third in the Republican primary.

=== Trump administration and Florida AHCA Secretary ===
In October 2018, Mayhew was hired by the administration of President Donald Trump to run Medicaid, but she resigned less than three months later for a new post under Florida Governor-elect Ron DeSantis. In a statement, Mayhew said she was "grateful" for the federal job and that the Trump administration's "vision for state flexibility" in the Medicaid program made her want to return to administer programs at the state level. On January 4, 2019, DeSantis tapped Mayhew to be Florida's chief Medicaid officer, replacing Justin Senior. On May 1, 2019, she was confirmed by the Florida Senate with a 26–13 vote.

=== Lobbying ===
In September 2020, Mayhew resigned from her position to take a job with the Florida Hospital Association, a lobbying group.
