= Florida Senate Bill 90 (2021) =

2021 state law in Florida, USA

Florida Legislature
- Long title: An act relating to elections; creating s. 97.029, F.S.; prohibiting certain persons from settling certain actions, consenting to conditions, or agreeing to certain orders in certain circumstances; requiring certain persons to make certain legal challenges and move to dismiss or otherwise terminate a court’s jurisdiction in certain circumstances; creating s. 97.0291, F.S.; prohibiting certain agencies and state and local officials from soliciting, accepting, or otherwise using private funds for election-related expenses; providing for construction; amending s. 97.052, F.S.; revising requirements for the uniform statewide voter registration application; amending s. 97.0525, F.S.; requiring the Division of Elections to maintain a website for the online voter registration system; providing additional requirements for a biennial comprehensive risk assessment of the online voter registration system; amending s. 97.053, F.S.; revising requirements governing the acceptance of voter registration applications; amending s. 97.057, F.S.; requiring the Department of Highway Safety and Motor Vehicles to assist the Department of State in identifying certain residence address changes; requiring the Department of State to report such changes to supervisors of elections; amending s. 97.0575, F.S.; revising requirements governing third party voter registration organizations; providing applicability; revising circumstances under which a third-party voter registration organization is subject to fines for violations regarding the delivery of voter registration applications; revising requirements for division rules governing third-party voter registration organizations; amending s. 97.0585, F.S.; deleting an exemption from public records requirements for information related to a voter registration applicant’s or voter’s prior felony conviction and his or her restoration of voting rights to conform to changes made by the act; amending s. 97.1031, F.S.; revising information that an elector must provide to a supervisor of elections when the elector changes his or her residence address, party affiliation, or name; amending s. 98.0981, F.S.; providing that certain ballot types or precinct subtotals may not be reported in precinct-level election results; requiring supervisors of elections to make certain data available on their websites and transmit such data to the division; requiring the division to create and maintain a certain dashboard; amending s. 99.012, F.S.; removing provisions relating to the method of filling a vacancy created by an officer’s resignation to qualify as a candidate for another public office; amending s. 99.021, F.S.; revising the oath for candidates seeking to qualify for nomination as a candidate of a political party; requiring a person seeking to qualify for office as a candidate with no party affiliation to subscribe to an oath or affirmation that he or she is registered without party affiliation and has not been a registered member of a political party for a specified timeframe; amending ss. 99.061 and 99.063, F.S.; conforming provisions to changes made by the act; amending s. 100.111, F.S.; revising the method of filling a vacancy in nomination for a political party; amending s. 101.051, F.S.; prohibiting certain solicitation of voters at drop box locations; increasing the no-solicitation zone surrounding a drop box location or the entrance of a polling place or an early voting site wherein certain activities are prohibited; conforming a provision; amending s. 101.131, F.S.; revising requirements for poll watcher identification badges; amending s. 101.545, F.S.; requiring ballots, forms, and election materials to be retained for a specified minimum timeframe following an election; amending s. 101.5605, F.S.; revising the timeframe within which the Department of State must approve or disapprove a voting system submitted for certification; amending s. 101.5614, F.S.; revising requirements for making true duplicate copies of vote-by-mail ballots under certain circumstances; requiring that an observer of the duplication of ballots be provided certain allowances; requiring that the duplication process take place in the presence of a canvassing board member; requiring a canvassing board to make certain determinations; amending s. 101.572, F.S.; requiring that voter certificates be open for public inspection; providing certain persons with reasonable access to ballot materials; requiring a supervisor to publish notice of such access; amending s. 101.591, F.S.; revising the timeframe and requirements for the voting systems audit report submitted to the department; amending s. 101.595, F.S.; requiring a specified report regarding overvotes and undervotes to be submitted with the voting systems audit report; revising the date by which the department must submit the report to the Governor and Legislature; amending s. 101.62, F.S.; limiting the duration of requests for vote-by-mail ballots to all elections through the end of the calendar year of the next regularly scheduled general election; requiring certain vote-by-mail ballot requests to include additional identifying information regarding the requesting elector; requiring supervisors of elections to record whether a voter’s certificate on a vote-by-mail ballot has a mismatched signature; revising the definition of the term “immediate family” to conform to changes made by the act; prohibiting counties, municipalities, and state agencies from sending vote-by-mail ballots to voters absent a request; specifying applicability of the act to outstanding vote-by-mail ballot requests; amending s. 101.64, F.S.; revising requirements for vote-by mail ballot mailing envelopes and secrecy envelopes; amending s. 101.68, F.S.; specifying that the supervisor may not use any knowledge of a voter’s party affiliation during the signature comparison process; authorizing the canvassing of vote-by-mail ballots upon the completion of the public preelection testing of automatic tabulating equipment; revising duties of the canvassing board with respect to protests; amending s. 101.69, F.S.; revising requirements governing the placement and supervision of secure drop boxes for the return of vote-by-mail ballots; requiring the supervisor to designate drop box locations in advance of an election; prohibiting changes in drop box locations for an election after their initial designation; specifying requirements regarding the retrieval of vote-by-mail ballots returned in a drop box; providing that the supervisor is subject to a civil penalty for certain violations regarding drop boxes; amending s. 102.031, F.S.; prohibiting certain solicitation activities within a specified area surrounding a drop box; expanding the definition of “solicit” and “solicitation”; providing for construction; restricting certain persons from prohibiting the solicitation of voters by a candidate or a candidate’s designee outside of the no solicitation zone; creating s. 102.072, F.S.; requiring the supervisor of elections to post and update on his or her website vote-by-mail ballot data at specified intervals; amending s. 102.141, F.S.; requiring the names of canvassing board members be published on the supervisor’s website before the tabulation of any vote-by-mail ballots in an election; authorizing each political party and candidate to have one watcher at canvassing board meetings within a distance that allows him or her to directly observe proceedings; requiring additional information be included in public notices of canvassing board meetings; amending s. 104.0616, F.S.; revising the definition of “immediate family”; prohibiting any person from distributing, ordering, requesting, collecting, delivering, or otherwise physically possessing more than two vote-by-mail ballots of other electors per election, not including immediate family members; providing exceptions; providing a penalty; providing an effective date.
- Enacted by: 2020–2022 Florida Legislature
- Enacted: 6 May 2021
- Signed by: Ron DeSantis
- Introduced by: Dennis Baxley
- Introduced: 3 February 2021

Florida Senate Bill 90 (SB 90) is a law in the state of Florida which amends the state's election law.

== Background ==
The coronavirus pandemic meant that the 2020 United States elections had seen high levels of mail-in voting, with up to 46% of voters saying they voted by mail. In Florida, 4.8 million voters chose to vote by mail, with more Democrats voting absentee than Republicans for the first time in several election cycles.

After Joe Biden's victory in the 2020 presidential election. Trump supporters unsuccessfully attempted to overturn the election results. SB 90 is seen to be part of Republican efforts to restrict voting rights following the election.

SB 90 restricts access to mail-in voting as well as limiting the ability of independent organisations to be involved with elections, leading to the Brennan Center for Justice and the NAACP Legal Defense Fund to describe it as a voter suppression measure.

Supporters argue that the law is a preventative measure in order to "restore faith and confidence in elections".

== Provisions ==
General provisions of the act include:

- Regulating behaviour of state officials in civil actions which effect Florida's election law:
  - Making it so that in any litigation challenging the validity of a provision of the Florida Electoral Code in which a Florida government official is a party, the official (or anyone working on their behalf) must communicate in writing details of any proposed settlement to the President of the Florida Senate, Speaker of the Florida House of Representatives and the Florida Attorney General throughout the process.
  - Compelling state officials or their representatives to 'promptly' move to dismiss cases once the Florida Legislature has amended the law to remove provisions which are rendered invalid or unenforceable by a court ruling.
- Prohibiting state agencies from using any donations or personal services for the purpose of funding election-related expenses, voter education, voter outreach or registration programs. (Note: Exempts the donation and acceptance of space for use as a polling site.)
- Restoring the former felon declaration of voting eligibility after changes made following Florida Amendment 4's passing in 2018 were overturned by Judge Robert Hinkle.
- Adding extra risk assessment requirements for online voter registration systems.
- Requiring the Florida Department of Highway Safety and Motor Vehicles to assist the Department of State in identifying voters who have changed their address.

=== Voter registration ===
Provisions include:

- Amending the regulations governing organizations and their volunteers who promote voter registration:
  - Clarifying that only volunteers who collect and handle registration applications need to be registered with the voting division, not volunteers who only solicit applications.
  - Repealing the requirement for volunteers to undertake a sworn statement saying they will obey all state laws regarding voter registration.
- Amending requirements for voter registration organizations delivering of applications:
  - Requiring applications to be submitted to the county in which the applicant lives.
  - Extending the delivery time requirement from 48 hours after the application was completed by the applicant to 14 days after.
  - Laying out information that organizations must provide to applicants using their services.

=== Voting by mail ===
Provisions included:

- Making it a first degree misdemeanor to possess more than two vote-by-mail ballots, not including one's own and those of an immediate family member.
- Expanding the definition of "immediate family member" to include grandchildren. (Note: Previously defined as a person's spouse or the parent, child, grandparent or sibling of the person or their spouse.)
- Expanding rules on making duplicates of damaged mail-in ballots during counting:
  - Requiring duplicates to be made in "an open and accessible room".
  - Allowing duplicates of over or undervoted mail-in ballots only if there is a clear indication that the voter made a definite choice in that election or ballot measure.
  - Allowing candidates, party officials or political committee officials to observe the duplication taking place, including the markings made on each ballot.
  - Requiring duplication to happen in the presence of at least one canvassing board member.
  - Allowing observers present to make objections to a duplication which, if reasonable, must be presented to the canvassing board which notes the serial number in its minutes and decides on its validity. If valid, it must be counted and if invalid, it must be replaced with another duplication.
- Allowing a single request to vote by mail to be sufficient to receive mail-in ballots for all elections until the end of the calendar year of the next regularly scheduled general election.
- Allowing requests for mail-in ballots submitted before the act comes into force to stand until the end of 2022.
- Reforming methods of requesting a mail-in ballot:
  - Allowing voters to request to vote by mail in person.
  - Requiring requests made in person or by telephone to provide a Florida driver's license number, a Florida ID card number or the last four digits of their social security number.
  - Requiring requests in writing to, in addition to the provision of a form of identification, be signed by the elector.

=== No-solicitation zones ===
No-solicitation zones are areas around polling stations where campaigning and political activities are restricted for the duration of an election. Under Florida law, anywhere within 150 feet (46 m) of a polling place, early voting site or election supervisor office is a no-solicitation zone. SB 90 made provision for:

- Drop box sites to be added to sites protected by no-solicitation zones
- Expands the definition of solicitation to include any activity with the intent to or effect of influencing voters.

== Passage ==
SB 90 was introduced by Republican Dennis Baxley, reviving a similar bill introduced by Jeff Brandes in a past legislative session and building on recent proposals put forward by Florida Governor Ron DeSantis.

Clauses requiring a handwritten signature for mail-in voters (rather than a digital one obtained from the Department of Motor Vehicles' databases) were scrapped after it became a focal point of debate around the bill.

The Florida Senate approved the bill 23-17 on 26 April with Republican Jeff Brandes voting with Democrats against it, before it was sent to the House of Representatives where it was amended and passed 77-40 two days later. The amended bill was passed by the Senate 23-17 and the House 77-40 on the 29 April, the day before the regular session of the legislature ended.

The bill was signed by Governor DeSantis on 6 May in a bill-signing that aired exclusively on Fox News. DeSantis was criticised after other media outlets were neither told about the bill-signing nor allowed in. Fox News released a statement saying that they had not requested that the interview be exclusive, and later said that they had not known that DeSantis would sign the bill on camera. SB 90 came into effect immediately upon signing.

== Response ==
=== Before becoming law ===
Lake County Supervisor of Elections Alan Hays said that removing all existing requests for mail-in ballots would "cost the taxpayers of Florida somewhere between $12 and $16 million" and that the legislature should "rethink this". Later, the president of the Florida Supervisors of Elections, Craig Latimer said that the bill "doesn't make any sense" when legislators hadn't cited any instances of fraud that it would prevent.

The ACLU opposed SB 90 from its introduction, stating it would "make it harder for Floridians to cast a ballot by mail".

=== After becoming law ===
DeSantis said at the bill-signing that the act would protect the "integrity and transparency" of elections in Florida.

The Brennan Center for Justice called the act an "omnibus voter suppression bill" which was based on "unfounded and unspecified concerns about election integrity". The Florida branch of the ACLU called SB 90 "undemocratic" and accused legislators of "suppressing the right to vote". The President of the Florida branch of the League of Women Voters said that SB 90 shouldn't have "ever been filed as a bill" and that it would disenfranchise the elderly, disabled, students and people of colour.

Mike Bennett, the election supervisor for Manatee County, said that while the bill would suppress votes, it is not a voter suppression bill, and that it would cause "additional costs" of between $200,000 and $300,000.

In October 2021, it was reported that a survey of twelve of Florida's 67 election supervisors found an expected combined increase in costs of almost $165,000.

== Lawsuits ==
Several groups sued the state nine minutes after the bill was signed into law. The Florida branches of the League of Women Voters, Black Voters Matter, and the Alliance for Retired Americans along with three independent voters sued Laurel Lee, the Secretary of State of Florida and Ashley Moody, the Florida Attorney General, as well as the Election Supervisors of every county in the state, arguing that the act violated the First and Fourteenth Amendments.

The NAACP, Disability Rights Florida, and Common Cause also filed a suit against Lee the same morning, claiming SB 90 "illegally and unconstitutionally burdens the right to vote".

On May 18, another lawsuit was filed against Lee and Florida's election supervisors by several organisations including UnidosUS and the Hispanic Federation, alleging that SB 90 was racially discriminatory against Black and Latino voters, violating Section 2 of the Voting Rights Act of 1965.

On June 13, the Southern Poverty Law Center and the Fair Elections Center brought another suit against Lee and Moody on behalf of the Harriet Tubman Freedom Fighters and HeadCount to challenge the provision of SB 90 which mandates that third-party organisations conducting voter registration must give a disclaimer warning that they may not deliver applications on time. The suit argues that this "misleading warning" restricts the ability of third-party organisations to engage in advocacy or voter registration efforts, and that it violates the First and Fourteenth Amendments.

All four lawsuits were consolidated for the discovery phase, with League of Women Voters v. Lee named as the 'parent case'. In four rulings in October 2021, Judge Mark Walker allowed the suits to move forward, but dismissed some of the challenges for lack of standing; Walker noted that state attorneys would have been a better target for litigation than the Florida's attorney general. A motion to add Dave Aronberg, the state attorney for Florida's 15th judicial circuit, to League of Women Voters v. Lee as a new defendant was denied on November 4.

In November 2021, Walker allowed the Governor's Office and seven Republican legislators to not testify on the grounds of legislative and executive privilege. The University of Florida initially sought to bar three of its political science professors from testifying, saying that it may be "adverse to the university's interests as a state of Florida institution". The decision was later reversed, but the three professors sued the provost, president and board of trustees of the university for infringing their First Amendment rights.

On March 31, 2022, Walker ruled that SB 90 violated the Voting Rights Act of 1965. Walker issued a permanent injunction against the law’s restrictions on absentee ballot drop boxes and required Florida to obtain preclearance from federal courts before enacting election laws. Florida Governor Ron DeSantis and Attorney General Ashley Moody vowed to appeal the ruling.

== See also ==
- Voter suppression in the United States
