= Shevaun Harris =

American lawyer and government official

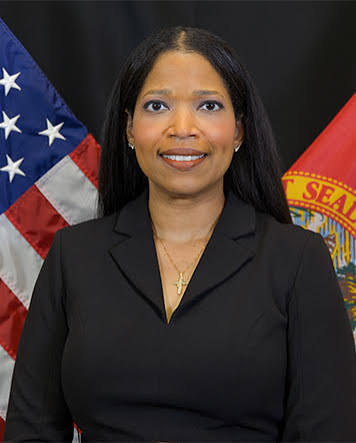
- Official portrait, 2025

Secretary of the Florida Agency for Health Care Administration
- Incumbent
- Assumed office February 2025
- Governor: Ron DeSantis
- Preceded by: Jason Weida
- In office October 15, 2020 – February 5, 2021; Acting
- Governor: Ron DeSantis
- Preceded by: Mary Mayhew
- Succeeded by: Simone Marstiller

Secretary of the Florida Department of Children and Families
- In office February 5, 2021 – February 2025
- Governor: Ron DeSantis
- Preceded by: Chad Poppell
- Succeeded by: Taylor Hatch

Personal details
- Party: Republican
- Education: Florida State University (BS); Quinnipiac University (MBA)

Shevaun Luisa Harris is an American social worker and government official has served as the Secretary of the Florida Agency for Health Care Administration since 2025.

== Education ==
Harris studied psychology and business at Florida State University, earning her Master of Social Work in 2004. She later received a Master in Business Administration from Quinnipiac University.

== Career ==
As a social worker, Harris worked with children and adults who were diagnosed with HIV/AIDS. She later went on to serve as an adjunct professor at Florida State University.

Harris began working at the Florida Agency for Health Care Administration in 2005. She served as acting secretary of the agency from October 2020 to February 2021.

In 2021, Florida Governor Ron DeSantis appointed Harris to serve as the Secretary of the Florida Department of Children and Families.

In February 2025, Harris was tapped to serve as Secretary of the Florida Agency for Health Care Administration following the resignation of Jason Weida. She was confirmed by the Florida Senate in 2026.
