= 2026 Florida Attorney General election =

- November 3, 2026
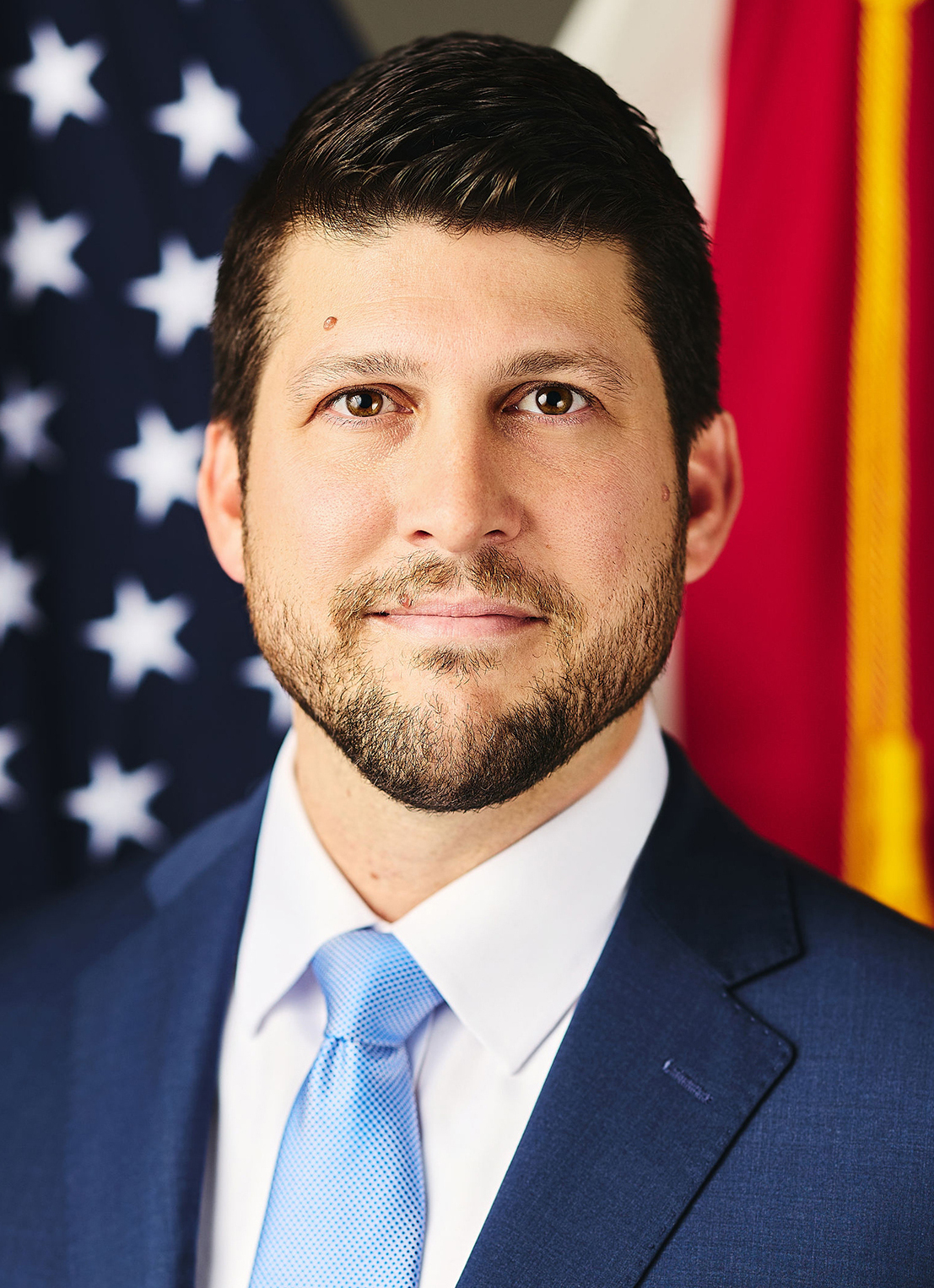

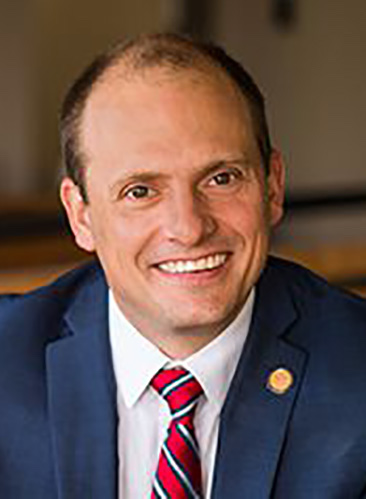
Nominee	James Uthmeier	José Javier Rodríguez
Party	Republican	Democratic
Popular vote	4,177,866	4,024,770
Percentage	50.9%	49.1%
- Uthmeier: 50–60% 60–70% 70–80% 80–90% Rodríguez: 50–60% 60–70%
Attorney General before election
James Uthmeier
Republican
Elected Attorney General
James Uthmeier
Republican

The 2026 Florida Attorney General election took place on November 3, 2026, to elect the Florida attorney general. Incumbent Republican attorney general James Uthmeier was appointed to the seat following Ashley Moody's appointment to the U.S. Senate. He ran for election to a full four-year term.

== Republican primary ==
=== Candidates ===
==== Nominee ====
- James Uthmeier, incumbent attorney general

==== Failed to qualify ====
- Steven Leskovich, interim Punta Gorda city attorney

==== Declined ====
- Pam Bondi, U.S. attorney general (2025–2026) and former Florida attorney general (2011–2019)
- Matt Gaetz, former U.S. representative from Florida's 1st congressional district (2017–2024)
- Daniel Perez, speaker of the Florida House of Representatives (2024–present) from the 116th district (2018–present)
- Paul Renner, former speaker of the Florida House of Representatives (2022–2024) from the 19th district (2015–2024) (running for governor)

=== Endorsements ===
James Uthmeier

Executive branch officials

- Donald Trump, 45th and 47th president of the United States (2017–2021, 2025–present)

County officials

- 51 county sheriffs

Party officials

- Evan Power, chair of the Republican Party of Florida (2024–present)

Political parties

- Republican Party of Florida

Organizations

- Club for Growth
- Republican Attorneys General Association

=== Polling ===
Hypothetical polling

Poll source	Date(s) administered	Sample size (Note: Key: A – all adults RV – registered voters LV – likely voters V – unclear)	Margin of error	Matt Gaetz	James Uthmeier	Undecided
Fabrizio, Lee & Associates (R)	February 26–27, 2025	600 (LV)	± 4.0%	39%	21%	40%

== Democratic primary ==
=== Candidates ===
==== Nominee ====
- José Javier Rodríguez, former assistant secretary of Labor for Employment and Training (2024–2025) and former state senator (2016–2020)

==== Failed to qualify ====
- Jim Lewis, lawyer and candidate for attorney general in 2022

==== Declined ====
- Jerry Demings, mayor of Orange County (2018–present) and husband of former U.S. representative Val Demings (ran for governor)

=== Endorsements ===
José Javier Rodríguez

Statewide officials

- Bob Butterworth, former Florida attorney general (1987–2002)
- Alex Sink, former chief financial officer of Florida (2007–2011)

State legislators

- Sean Shaw, former state representative from the 61st district (2016–2018) and nominee for attorney general in 2018

Local officials

- Dave Aronberg, former Palm Beach County state attorney (2013–2025)
- Dan Gelber, mayor of Miami Beach (2017–2023)

Organizations

- Latino Victory Fund
- End Citizens United
- SAVE Action PAC

Labor unions

- AFSCME Florida
- Florida AFL–CIO
- SEIU Florida

== General election ==
=== Predictions ===
Source	Ranking	As of
Sabato's Crystal Ball	Lean R	October 29, 2026

=== Post-primary endorsements ===
Jose Javier Rodriguez (D)

Labor unions

- United Auto Workers

Newspapers

- Miami Herald
- Orlando Sentinel
- Sun Sentinel

=== Polling ===
Poll source	Date(s) administered	Sample size	Margin of error	James Uthmeier (R)	José Javier Rodríguez (D)	Other	Undecided
St. Pete Polls (Note: Poll sponsored by Florida Politics)	October 25–27, 2026	916 (LV)	± 3.2%	49%	44%	–	7%
SEA Polling & Strategic Design (D) (Note: Poll sponsored by Rodríguez's campaign)	October 11–14, 2026	805 (LV)	± 3.5%	34%	35%	–	—
St. Pete Polls	October 5–7, 2026	836 (LV)	± 3.4%	45%	43%	–	12%
Targoz Market Research (Note: Poll sponsored by the James Madison Institute, a conservative think tank)	September 28 – October 4, 2026	854 (LV)	–	50%	40%	2% (Note: "Another candidate" with 2%)	7%
Targoz Market Research	September 28 – October 4, 2026	1,163 (RV)	± 2.77%	46%	37%	3% (Note: "Another candidate" with 3%)	14%
St. Pete Polls	September 15–17, 2026	913 (LV)	± 3.2%	43%	42%	–	15%
Change Research (D) (Note: Poll commissioned by Freedom Project USA)	September 7–9, 2026	1,107 (LV)	± 2.8%	46%	46%	2% (Note: "Would not vote" with 2%)	11%
Change Research (D)	May 13–16, 2026	1,593 (LV)	± 2.3%	41%	45%	–	14%
Change Research (D)	May 13–16, 2026	2,070 (RV)	± 2.3%	41%	40%	–	19%
MDW (D) (Note: Poll sponsored by Edge Communications)	March 27 – April 3, 2026	1,834 (LV)	± 2.0%	40%	43%	–	18%
University of North Florida	October 15–25, 2025	728 (LV)	± 4.3%	45% (Note: With voters who lean towards a given candidate)	36%	5% (Note: "Wouldn't vote" and "Refusal" with 2%; "Someone else" with 1%)	14%
University of North Florida	October 15–25, 2025	728 (LV)	± 4.3%	41%	35%	4% (Note: "Wouldn't vote" with 2%; "Refusal" and "Someone else" with 1%)	20%

=== Results ===
2026 Florida Attorney General election
Party	Candidate	Votes	%	±%
Republican	James Uthmeier (incumbent)			
Democratic	Jose Javier Rodriguez			
Total votes			100.0%	
Republican hold				

== See also ==
- 2026 United States attorney general elections
- Florida Attorney General

== Notes ==
Partisan clients
