= James Uthmeier =

American politician and attorney (born 1987)

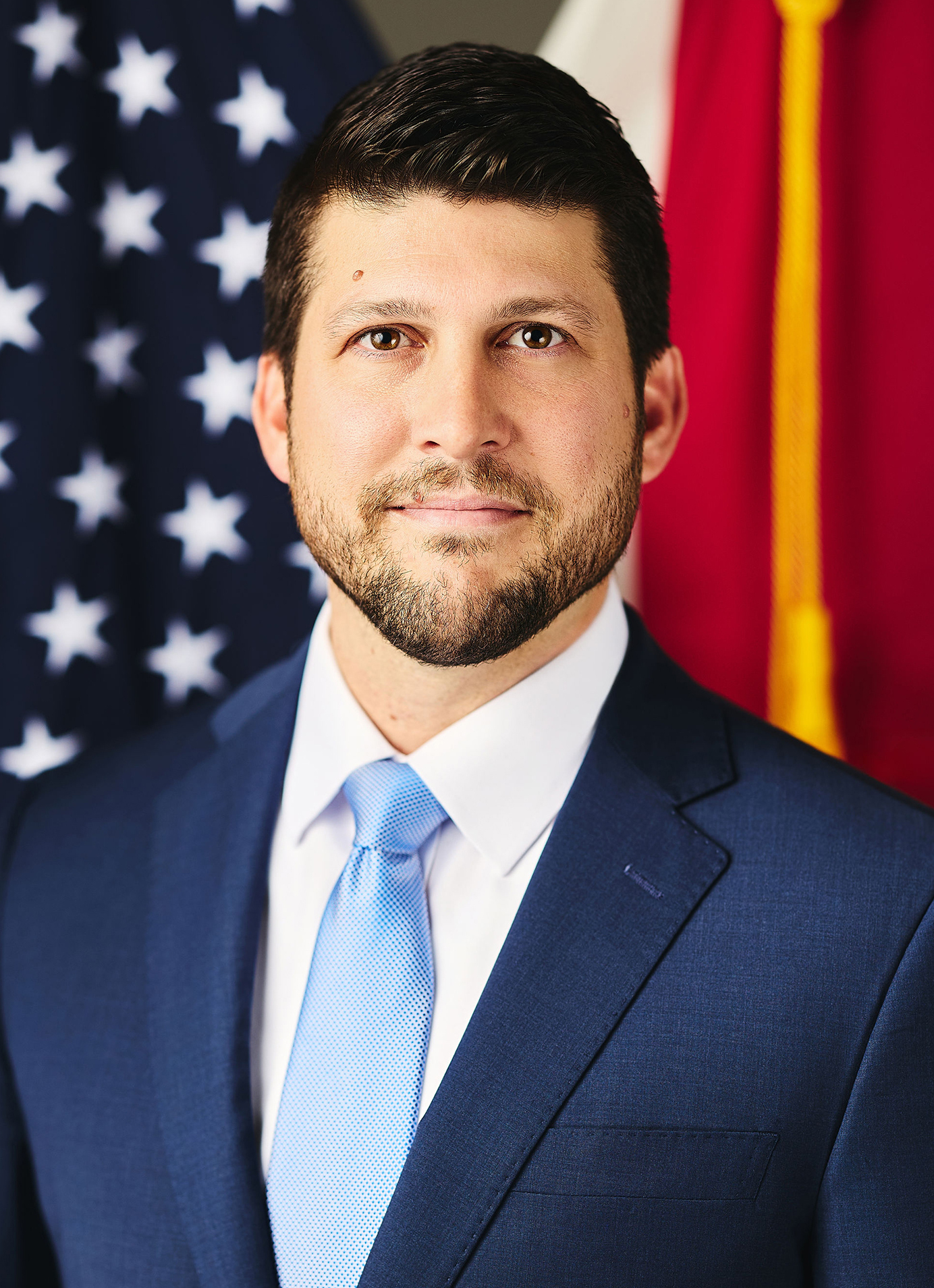
- Official portrait, 2025

39th Florida Attorney General
- Incumbent
- Assumed office February 17, 2025
- Governor: Ron DeSantis; Byron Donalds (elect)
- Preceded by: Ashley Moody

Chief of Staff to the Governor of Florida
- In office October 2021 – February 2025
- Governor: Ron DeSantis
- Preceded by: Adrian Lukis
- Succeeded by: Jason Weida

Personal details
- Born: James William Uthmeier; November 25, 1987 (age 38) Destin, Florida, U.S.
- Party: Republican
- Spouse: Jean Uthmeier
- Children: 3
- Education: University of Florida (BS, MA); Georgetown University (JD)
- Website: Office website Campaign website
- Uthmeier's voice Uthmeier on the indictment of Raúl Castro. Recorded May 20, 2026

James William Uthmeier (/ʌθmaɪər/ UHTH-my-ər; born November 25, 1987) is an American politician and attorney serving as the 39th attorney general of Florida since 2025. A member of the Republican Party, he previously served as chief of staff to Governor Ron DeSantis from 2021 to 2025.

== Early life and career ==
Uthmeier is a native of Destin, Florida. He attended Fort Walton Beach High School and later graduated from the University of Florida, where he had competed for the Florida Gators track and field program. He graduated from Georgetown University Law Center in 2014. Prior to joining the DeSantis administration he was an associate at Jones Day.

Uthmeier worked from 2017 to 2019 in the U.S. Department of Commerce as a senior counsel and senior advisor in the Trump administration. He then joined the office of Florida governor Ron DeSantis as deputy general counsel in 2019, then was promoted in 2020 to general counsel. In October 2021, he was appointed chief of staff to the governor, succeeding Adrian Lukis. He remained as chief of staff until his appointment as attorney general and was succeeded by Secretary Jason Weida.

From 2023 to 2024, Uthmeier served as campaign manager of Ron DeSantis's unsuccessful 2024 presidential campaign.

== Florida attorney general (2025–present) ==
On January 16, 2025, Governor DeSantis announced his intention to appoint Attorney General Ashley Moody to the United States Senate to succeed Marco Rubio. DeSantis also announced he would appoint Uthmeier to succeed Moody as attorney general, in the event of a vacancy.

On February 17, 2025, Uthmeier was sworn in as the 39th Florida attorney general. At 37, he became one of the youngest state attorneys general.

On February 25, 2025, he filed paperwork to seek a full term in 2026. The following day, Uthmeier released a new seal for the Office of the Florida attorney general, referencing the "Free State of Florida."

In March 2025, Uthmeier opened a criminal investigation into social media personalities Andrew and Tristan Tate, saying: "We're going to pursue every tool we have within our legal authority to hold them accountable". Despite the brothers' relocation to Las Vegas, Uthmeier confirmed his investigation would continue. Andrew Tate criticized the investigation as "absolute communism." On March 13, Andrew Tate returned to Miami and "taunted" Uthmeier to "arrest [him]."

In April 2025, Uthmeier issued a subpoena to Roblox demanding information about the platform's marketing to children, age-verification requirements, and chat room moderation policies. The subpoena sought documents showing steps Roblox takes to prevent children from exposure to mature content, communications with the National Center for Missing & Exploited Children relating to Florida users, and reports of abuse from Florida users. On October 20, 2025, Uthmeier escalated the investigation by issuing criminal subpoenas to Roblox, stating that "multiple investigations have revealed that sexual predators are using Roblox to access, communicate with, and groom minors." Roblox stated it would "continue to assist his office in their investigations" and that it has "a strong record of working with law enforcement."

In June 2025, Uthmeier was held in contempt of court by U.S. district judge Kathleen M. Williams for continuing to enforce a Florida immigration law that the judge had blocked in a previous ruling, which Uthmeier had directed state law enforcement to ignore and then discussed in media interviews. Uthmeier stated "If being held in contempt is what it costs to... stand firmly behind President Trump's agenda on illegal immigration, so be it."

In late June 2025, Uthmeier announced his proposal to construct Alligator Alcatraz, an immigration detention facility to be located within the Everglades. The facility is located at the former Dade-Collier Training and Transition Airport inside Big Cypress National Preserve in Ochopee, Florida. Governor DeSantis mobilized construction on June 21, and the facility was officially opened on July 1. President Donald Trump, Governor Ron DeSantis, Secretary of Homeland Security Kristi Noem, and other state leaders attended the opening ceremony. Trump praised the new compound, saying, "It might be as good as the real Alcatraz." In December 2025, Uthmeier praised President Trump for vetoing bipartisan legislation to provide flood protection to Osceola Camp, a small Miccosukee village in the Everglades, because the tribe had filed a lawsuit against Alligator Alcatraz. In June 2026, Alligator Alcatraz was shuttered

In November 2025, Uthmeier opened an investigation into JPMorgan Chase, alleging the bank coordinated with special counsel Jack Smith and terminated Trump Media & Technology Group's accounts "in the shadow of" the Arctic Frost investigation. JPMorgan stated the bank "follows the law in responding to subpoenas."

On March 4, 2026, Uthmeier announced at a news conference in Miami that his office would reopen a state-level criminal investigation into former Cuban leader Raúl Castro's role in the 1996 shootdown of Brothers to the Rescue aircraft. According to NBC 6 South Florida, Uthmeier stated that a previous investigation had been shut down during the Biden administration.

In May 2026, Uthmeier described surrogacy as "modern day slavery" and said that the practice "must be stopped."

In July 2026, Uthmeier's office intervened to force a national women's Irish step dancing competition to exclude a teenage transgender girl who had already won twice, arguing that the inclusion of a transgender competitor in a dancing competition "deprives women of the full and equal enjoyment of fair competition".

After Ashley Herrmann, a DSA-supported candidate, was elected to the Florida House of Representatives in November 2026, Uthmeier filed a subpoena against the Democratic Socialists of America, in pursuit of claims that the DSA and its Florida chapters had obtained "contributions or support from foreign sources of concern" from China or Cuba, which would violate state fundraising law.

=== Hope Florida Foundation scandal ===
During the 2025 legislative session, Uthmeier was involved in a controversy surrounding the transfer of $10,000,000 from a Medicaid settlement to a political committee he controlled. In September 2024, Florida reached a $67 million settlement with Centene Corporation for Medicaid overbilling. Under the agreement, $10 million was directed to the Hope Florida Foundation, a nonprofit affiliated with state First Lady Casey DeSantis. The Foundation transferred $5 million each to two nonprofit organizations, Secure Florida's Future and Save Our Society from Drugs, which then donated $8.5 million to Keep Florida Clean, a political committee chaired by Uthmeier that campaigned against Amendment 3, the recreational marijuana ballot initiative.

State Representative Alex Andrade, who chaired the House Health Care Budget Subcommittee investigation, accused Uthmeier and Jeff Aaron, the Foundation's outside counsel, of engaging in "a conspiracy to commit money laundering and wire fraud" and "misuse of $10 million in Medicaid funds." Uthmeier denied wrongdoing, stating he "wasn't part of securing the deal" and that "everything looks legal." He described the $10 million as a "sweetener" voluntarily added by Centene on top of the $57 million settlement amount owed to the state, arguing that donations to a 501(c)(3) entity "is not state dollars, that is not Medicaid dollars."

In May 2025, Uthmeier dismissed the allegations as a "smear campaign" and said government officials have "a right, maybe even a duty, to protect the state" by fighting ballot initiatives. Governor DeSantis called the investigation a "smear" and suggested critics "view it as a way to attack the first lady", whom he said some view "as a threat."

On May 20, 2025, a criminal investigation into the movement of the funds was announced. In December 2025, Florida's required payment to the federal government indicated the state was including the $10 million in calculating its Medicaid pass-through obligation, contradicting the administration's characterization of the funds as a separate charitable donation. "Not only did we lose $10 million, we are still paying the feds back for it," Andrade said.

On October 7, 2026, Florida's First District Court of Appeal ordered the complete expungement of the Leon County grand jury report concerning the Hope Florida Foundation and the $10 million Centene settlement. In its ruling, the court determined that the grand jury had exceeded its legal authority by alleging criminal wrongdoing and publicly censuring individuals, including Uthmeier, without returning indictments. The court further rejected the grand jury's conclusion that the funds had been misappropriated, finding that the statutes cited did not apply to the pre-litigation settlement and that the $10 million had been transferred directly from Centene to the Hope Florida Foundation rather than becoming state funds.

Writing for the court, Judge Lance Neff also determined that the premature distribution of the confidential grand jury report by the State Attorney's Office violated statutory protections afforded to individuals named in grand jury proceedings. The appellate court reversed the lower court’s partial-expungement order and directed that the entire report be expunged. The decision invalidated the grand jury’s legal conclusions.

Legal offices
Preceded by John Guard (acting)	Florida Attorney General; 2025–present	Incumbent
