= 2018 Florida Attorney General election =

- November 6, 2018
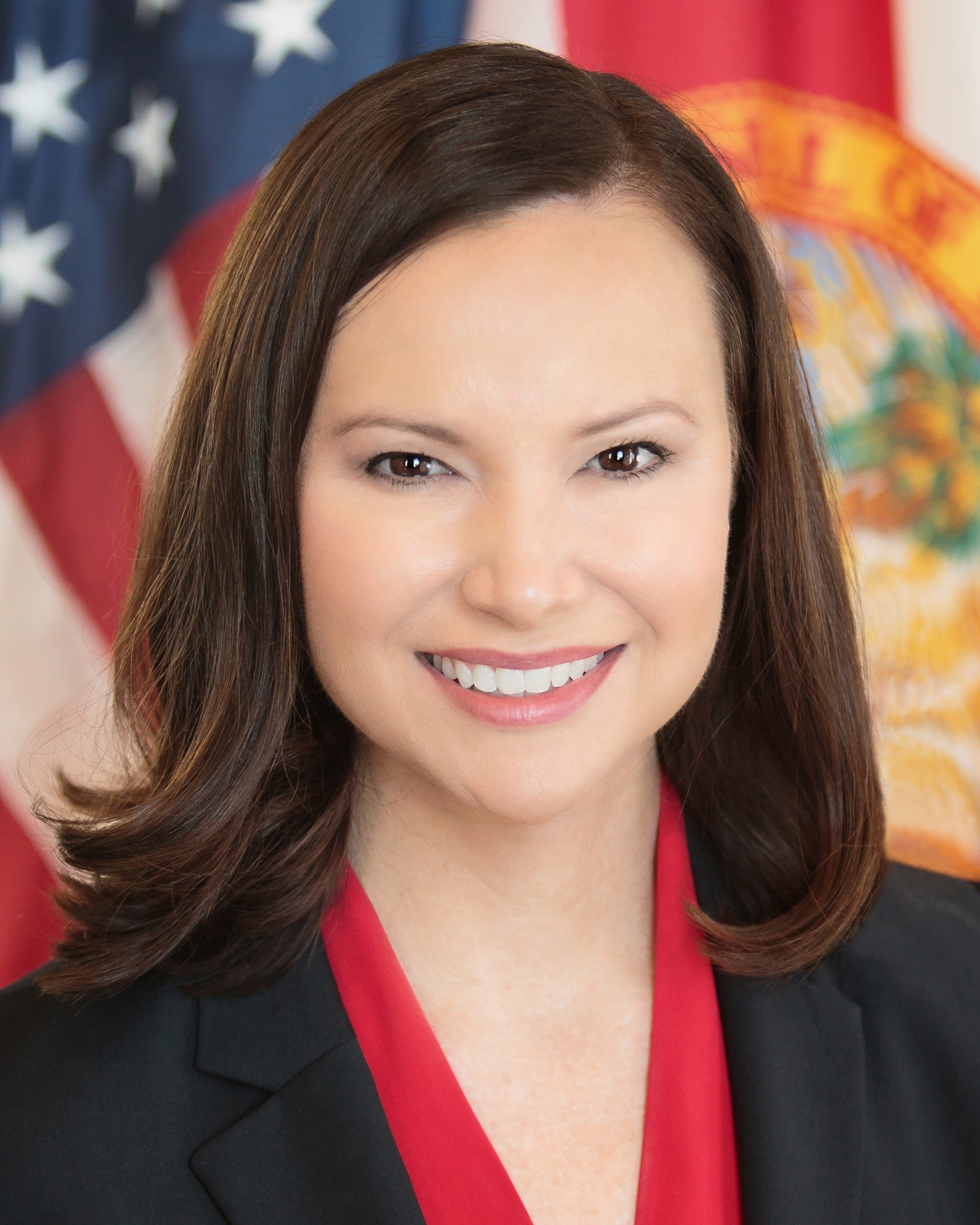

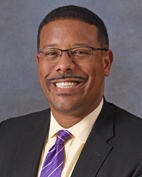
Nominee	Ashley Moody	Sean Shaw
Party	Republican	Democratic
Popular vote	4,232,532	3,744,912
Percentage	52.11%	46.10%
- Moody: 40–50% 50–60% 60–70% 70–80% 80–90% >90% Shaw: 40–50% 50–60% 60–70% 70–80% 80–90% >90% Tie: 40–50% 50% No votes
Attorney General before election
Pam Bondi
Republican
Elected Attorney General
Ashley Moody
Republican

The 2018 Florida Attorney General election took place on November 6, 2018, to elect the Florida attorney general. Incumbent Republican attorney general Pam Bondi was term-limited and could not seek a third consecutive term.

Republican candidate Ashley Moody defeated Democrat Sean Shaw in the election on November 6, 2018, at 93% of the precincts reporting. Moody won by about 6 percentage points, the widest margin of any Florida statewide race in 2018.

== Republican primary ==
=== Candidates ===
==== Declared ====
- Ashley Moody, former judge of the Thirteenth Judicial Circuit Court of Florida
- Frank White, state representative

==== Withdrawn ====
- Jay Fant, state representative
- Ross Spano, state representative (withdrew to run for U.S. House)

==== Declined ====
- Rob Bradley, state senator
- Richard Corcoran, Speaker of the Florida House of Representatives
- Ron DeSantis, U.S. representative and candidate for U.S. Senate in 2016 (running for governor)
- José Félix Díaz, former state representative and 2017 state senate candidate
- Matt Gaetz, U.S. representative
- Tom Grady, Florida Board of Education member and former state representative
- Simone Marstiller, former judge of the Florida First District Court of Appeal and former Florida Associate Deputy Attorney General
- Bill McCollum, former attorney general, former U.S. representative, candidate for governor in 2010
- Joe Negron, president of the Florida Senate and nominee for FL-16 in 2006
- Tom Rooney, U.S. representative
- David Simmons, state senator
- Dana Young, state senator

=== Endorsements ===
Ashley Moody

U.S. representatives

- Lincoln Díaz-Balart, former U.S. representative (FL-21)
- Matt Gaetz, U.S. representative (FL-01)

Statewide officials

- Pam Bondi, attorney general of Florida

State legislators

- Clay Ingram, state representative (R-Pensacola)
- Tom Lee, state senator (R-Brandon)
- Joe Negron, state senator (R-Stuart), President of the Florida Senate
- Wilton Simpson, state senator (R-Spring Hill)
- Jay Trumbull, state representative (R-Panama City)
- Dana Young, state senator (R-Tampa)

Mayors and other municipal officials

- Mike Adkinson, Walton County sheriff
- Phil Archer, 18th Judicial Circuit State Attorney
- Paul Blackman, Highlands County sheriff
- David Borrero, Sweetwater city commissioner
- Ed Brodsky, 12th Judicial Circuit State Attorney
- William Cervone, 8th Judicial Circuit State Attorney
- Chad Chronister, Hillsborough County sheriff
- Angelina "Angel" Colonneso, Manatee County Clerk of Court
- Bruce Colton, 19th Judicial Circuit State Attorney
- Victor Crist, Hillsborough County commissioner
- Daryl Daniels, Clay County sheriff
- Henry Dean, St. Johns County commissioner
- John Drew, Nassau County Tax Collector
- William O. Farmer Jr., Sumter County sheriff
- Tommy Ford, Bay County sheriff
- Peyton C. Grinnell, Lake County sheriff
- Bob Gualtieri, Pinellas County sheriff
- Brian Haas, 10th Judicial Circuit State Attorney
- Ken Hagan, Hillsborough County commissioner
- Darrell Harris, Hendry County commissioner
- Mike Harrison, Gulf County sheriff
- Pamm Henderson, mayor of Callaway
- Glenn Hess, 14th Judicial Circuit State Attorney
- Michael Hickox, Nassau County Property Appraiser
- Al Higginbotham, Hillsborough County commissioner
- Mark Hunter, Columbia County Sheriff
- Bill Husfelt, Bay County Superintendent of Schools
- Wayne Ivey, Brevard County sheriff
- Melody Johnson, Volusia County School Board member
- Grady Judd, Polk County sheriff
- Ed Helley, Volusia County councilman
- Brad King, 5th Judicial Circuit State Attorney
- Bill Kinsaul, Bay County Clerk of Court
- Tom Knight, Sarasota County sheriff
- Arnold Lanier, Hardee County sheriff
- R. J. Larizza, 7th Judicial Circuit State Attorney
- Bill Leeper, Nassau County sheriff
- Deryl Loar, Indian River County sheriff
- Bernie McCabe, 6th Judicial Circuit State Attorney
- Bobby McCallum, Levy County sheriff
- Bob McKee, Lake County Tax Collector
- Alfred Kenneth "Mac" McNeill Jr., Jefferson County sheriff
- Jared Miller, Wakulla County sheriff
- Sandy Murman, Hillsborough County commissioner
- Tod Neville, St. Augustine City commissioner
- Al Nienhuis, Hernando County sheriff
- Chris Nocco, Pasco County sheriff
- Wayne Padgett, Taylor County sheriff
- Marion Poitevint, Gilchrist County commissioner
- Kevin Rambosk, Collier County sheriff
- Rick Ramsay, Monroe County sheriff
- Scotty Rhoden, Baker County sheriff
- Bobby Schultz, Gilchrist County sheriff
- Rhonda Skipper, Walton County Tax Collector
- A. J. Smith, Franklin County sheriff
- William Snyder, Martin County sheriff
- George Spicer, Nassau County commissioner
- Ben Stewart, Madison County sheriff
- Francis Suarez, mayor of Miami
- Justin Taylor, Nassau County commissioner
- Mike Thomas, mayor of Panama City Beach
- William Truex, Charlotte County Commissioner
- Dennis Ward, 16th Judicial Circuit State Attorney
- Mike Williams, Duval County sheriff
- Steve Whidden, Hendry County sheriff
- Stacy White, Hillsborough County commissioner

Organizations

- Florida Chamber of Commerce
- Florida Police Benevolent Association
- Maggie's List

Newspapers

- Miami Herald
Frank White

U.S. representatives

- Jeff Miller, former U.S. representative (FL-01)
- John Rutherford, U.S. representative (FL-04)

State legislators

- Cord Byrd, state representative (R-Neptune Beach)
- Neil Combee, former state representative (R-Polk County)
- Brad Drake, state representative (R-Eucheeanna)
- Mel Ponder, state representative (R-Destin
- Cyndi Stevenson, state representative (R-St. Johns)
- Jennifer Sullivan, state representative (R-Mount Dora)
- Jayer Williamson, state representative (R-Pace)

Mayors and other municipal officials

- Larry Ashley, Okaloosa County sheriff
- Jeff Bergosh, Escambia County commissioner
- Lenny Curry, mayor of Jacksonville
- Matt Dannheisser, mayor of Gulf Breeze
- Homer "Gator" Deloach, Putnam County
- Graham Fountain, Okaloosa County commissioner
- Ashton Hayward, mayor of Pensacola
- Bob Johnson, Santa Rosa County sheriff
- Carolyn Ketchel, Okaloosa County commissioner
- David Morgan, Escambia County sheriff
- Grover Robinson, Escambia County commissioner
- David Shoar, St. Johns County sheriff

=== Polling ===
Poll source	Date(s) administered	Sample size	Margin of error	Ashley Moody	Frank White	Undecided
Gravis Marketing	August 21–25, 2018	579	± 4.1%	35%	32%	33%
Gravis Marketing	August 21–22, 2018	321	± 5.5%	34%	31%	35%
St. Pete Polls	August 3–4, 2018	1,755	± 2.3%	28%	39%	33%
St. Pete Polls	July 10–11, 2018	1,387	± 2.6%	19%	26%	55%

=== Results ===
Republican primary results
Party	Candidate	Votes	%
Republican	Ashley B. Moody	882,028	56.8
Republican	Frank White	670,823	43.2
Total votes		1,552,851	100.0

== Democratic primary ==
=== Candidates ===
==== Declared ====
- Sean Shaw, state representative
- Ryan Torrens, attorney

==== Declined ====
- Mitchell Berger, attorney
- José Javier Rodríguez, state senator (running for FL-27)
- Katherine Fernandez Rundle, Miami-Dade State Attorney
- Jack Seiler, Mayor of Fort Lauderdale
- Rod Smith, former state senator, former chair of the Florida Democratic Party, candidate for governor in 2006 and nominee for lieutenant governor in 2010
- Ryan Yadav, attorney and 2016 State House candidate

=== Endorsements ===
Sean Shaw

Former U.S. executive branch officials

- Joe Biden, 47th vice president of the United States

U.S. senators

- Bob Graham, 38th governor of Florida and former U.S. senator from Florida

Statewide officials

- Alex Sink, former Chief Financial Officer of Florida, Democratic nominee for governor in 2010, Democratic nominee for U.S. House in 2014

Mayors and other municipal leaders

- Dave Aronberg, 15th Judicial Circuit State Attorney
- Jack Campbell, 2nd Judicial Circuit State Attorney
- Andrew Warren, 13th Judicial Circuit State Attorney

Organizations

- Florida Education Association
- Florida Police Benevolent Association
- Florida Professional Firefighters
- Florida Young Democrats
Ryan Torrens

State legislators

- John Cortes, State Representative (D-Kissimmee)
- Amy Mercado, State Representative (D-Orlando)
- Vic Torres, State Senator (D-Orlando)

=== Results ===
Democratic primary results
Party	Candidate	Votes	%
Democratic	Sean Shaw	1,031,640	73.8
Democratic	Ryan Torrens	367,053	26.2
Total votes		1,398,693	100.0

== Independents ==
=== Candidates ===
- Jeffrey Siskind, attorney

== General election ==
=== Predictions ===
Source	Ranking	As of
Governing	Tossup	October 26, 2018

=== Polling ===
View source data.

Poll source	Date(s) administered	Sample size	Margin of error	Ashley Moody (R)	Sean Shaw (D)	Other	Undecided
University of North Florida	October 23–26, 2018	1,048	± 3.0%	47%	40%	<1%	13%
Gravis Marketing	October 22–23, 2018	773	± 3.5%	46%	42%	–	11%
Schroth, Eldon & Associates (D-EDGE Comms.)	October 17–20, 2018	600	± 4.0%	43%	37%	–	20%
Cherry Communications	September 19–24, 2018	622	± 4.4%	33%	35%	—	20%
Public Policy Polling (D-EDGE Comms.)	August 29–30, 2018	743	–	44%	41%	–	15%
Public Policy Polling (D-EDGE Communications)	June 18–19, 2018	1,308	—	35%	40%	—	25%
Anzalone Liszt Grove (D-Sean Shaw)	May 31 – June 6, 2018	1,204	—	36%	41%	2%	21%
Public Policy Polling	April 10–11, 2018	661	—	34%	33%	—	34%

Hypothetical polling

with Frank White

Poll source	Date(s) administered	Sample size	Margin of error	Frank White (R)	Sean Shaw (D)	Other	Undecided
Anzalone Liszt Grove (D-Sean Shaw)	May 31 – June 6, 2018	1,204	—	36%	40%	3%	21%
Public Policy Polling	April 10–11, 2018	661	—	32%	33%	—	34%

=== Results ===
2018 Florida Attorney General election
Party	Candidate	Votes	%	±%
Republican	Ashley Moody	4,232,532	52.11%	−2.99%
Democratic	Sean Shaw	3,744,912	46.10%	+4.09%
Independent	Jeffrey Siskind	145,296	1.79%	N/A
Total votes		8,122,740	100.0%	N/A
Republican hold				

==== By county ====
County	Ashley Moody Republican		Sean Shaw Democratic		Jeffrey Siskind Independent	
County	#	%	#	%	#	%
Alachua	43,897	38.7%	67,657	59.6%	1,957	1.7%
Baker	8,777	83.8%	1,605	15.3%	94	0.9%
Bay	46,313	73.7%	15,458	24.6%	1,100	1.7%
Bradford	7,791	75.0%	2,423	23.3%	171	1.7%
Brevard	168,379	60.3%	105,093	37.7%	5,639	2.0%
Broward	220,278	31.5%	467,982	67.0%	10,266	1.5%
Calhoun	3,531	77.5%	947	20.8%	81	1.7%
Charlotte	55,028	64.5%	28,427	33.3%	1,921	2.2%
Citrus	49,669	70.6%	19,026	27.0%	1,704	2.4%
Clay	66,401	71.6%	24,791	26.8%	1,484	1.6%
Collier	102,682	66.8%	49,363	32.1%	1,761	1.1%
Columbia	17,568	71.3%	6,726	27.3%	362	1.4%
DeSoto	5,874	66.5%	2,802	31.7%	153	1.8%
Dixie	4,741	82.3%	937	16.3%	84	1.4%
Duval	189,329	50.4%	180,292	48.0%	5,930	1.6%
Escambia	77,109	60.2%	48,501	37.9%	2,403	1.9%
Flagler	32,053	61.1%	19,483	37.1%	960	1.8%
Franklin	3,449	64.7%	1,759	33.0%	122	2.3%
Gadsden	6,642	33.4%	13,042	65.6%	192	1.0%
Gilchrist	6,095	83.1%	1,148	15.7%	92	1.2%
Glades	2,690	70.9%	1,032	27.2%	73	1.9%
Gulf	4,300	73.6%	1,426	24.4%	118	2.0%
Hamilton	2,942	65.1%	1,530	33.9%	47	1.0%
Hardee	4,712	74.0%	1,547	24.3%	107	1.7%
Hendry	5,332	60.8%	3,289	37.5%	148	1.7%
Hernando	52,218	65.2%	26,090	32.6%	1,749	2.2%
Highlands	27,231	68.9%	11,587	29.3%	701	1.8%
Hillsborough	258,082	49.8%	251,985	48.6%	8,672	1.6%
Holmes	5,921	87.7%	732	10.8%	102	1.5%
Indian River	46,247	63.1%	25,807	35.2%	1,240	1.7%
Jackson	10,744	67.7%	4,956	31.2%	169	1.1%
Jefferson	3,992	55.1%	3,138	43.3%	115	1.6%
Lafayette	2,355	83.8%	415	14.8%	39	1.4%
Lake	96,282	62.6%	54,686	35.5%	2,957	1.9%
Lee	179,082	62.7%	101,425	35.5%	4,992	1.8%
Leon	53,398	38.8%	81,881	59.5%	2,379	1.7%
Levy	12,496	73.5%	4,259	25.1%	239	1.4%
Liberty	2,014	76.6%	566	21.5%	48	1.9%
Madison	4,413	58.3%	3,084	40.8%	69	0.9%
Manatee	96,918	59.8%	61,755	38.1%	3,305	2.1%
Marion	98,396	64.1%	52,779	34.4%	2,391	1.5%
Martin	49,112	64.4%	25,817	33.8%	1,386	1.8%
Miami-Dade	307,638	39.4%	457,283	58.6%	15,408	2.0%
Monroe	18,411	52.0%	16,196	45.8%	768	2.2%
Nassau	32,320	74.9%	10,323	23.9%	511	1.2%
Okaloosa	61,090	73.4%	20,351	24.5%	1,743	2.1%
Okeechobee	7,946	71.3%	3,008	27.0%	193	1.7%
Orange	186,732	39.8%	273,906	58.4%	8,667	1.8%
Osceola	47,031	41.3%	64,603	56.7%	2,236	2.0%
Palm Beach	246,796	42.5%	323,380	55.7%	10,091	1.8%
Pasco	129,854	61.7%	76,248	36.3%	4,217	2.0%
Pinellas	228,560	53.0%	193,229	44.8%	9,056	2.2%
Polk	142,971	58.9%	95,766	39.4%	4,076	1.7%
Putnam	19,067	68.3%	8,375	30.0%	472	1.7%
Santa Rosa	57,320	76.3%	16,078	21.4%	1,723	2.3%
Sarasota	117,001	55.9%	88,462	42.3%	3,751	1.8%
Seminole	101,735	51.8%	90,718	46.2%	3,851	2.0%
St. Johns	85,912	66.5%	41,200	31.9%	2,104	1.6%
St. Lucie	61,426	50.0%	59,140	48.1%	2,266	1.9%
Sumter	53,435	72.2%	19,716	26.7%	813	1.1%
Suwannee	12,393	78.2%	3,244	20.5%	212	1.3%
Taylor	5,964	75.7%	1,847	23.4%	70	0.9%
Union	3,857	79.8%	912	18.9%	67	1.3%
Volusia	130,511	57.6%	91,437	40.4%	4,538	2.0%
Wakulla	9,858	69.9%	3,985	28.2%	268	1.9%
Walton	23,222	77.0%	6,407	21.2%	527	1.8%
Washington	6,999	77.8%	1,850	20.6%	146	1.6%
Total	4,232,532	52.11%	3,744,912	46.10%	145,296	1.79%

Counties that flipped from Republican to Democratic

- Osceola (largest municipality: Kissimmee)

==== By congressional district ====
Moody won 15 of 27 congressional districts, including one that elected a Democrat.

District	Moody	Shaw	Representative
1st	69%	29%	Matt Gaetz
2nd	68%	31%	Neal Dunn
3rd	58%	41%	Ted Yoho
4th	64%	34%	John Rutherford
5th	37%	62%	Al Lawson
6th	59%	39%	Ron DeSantis
6th	59%	39%	Mike Waltz
7th	48%	50%	Stephanie Murphy
8th	61%	37%	Bill Posey
9th	47%	51%	Darren Soto
10th	39%	60%	Val Demings
11th	67%	31%	Daniel Webster
12th	61%	37%	Gus Bilirakis
13th	51%	47%	Charlie Crist
14th	45%	53%	Kathy Castor
15th	57%	42%	Dennis Ross
15th	57%	42%	Ross Spano
16th	56%	42%	Vern Buchanan
17th	65%	33%	Tom Rooney
17th	65%	33%	Greg Steube
18th	55%	43%	Brian Mast
19th	64%	34%	Francis Rooney
20th	18%	81%	Alcee Hastings
21st	40%	58%	Lois Frankel
22nd	41%	57%	Ted Deutch
23rd	37%	61%	Debbie Wasserman Schultz
24th	17%	82%	Frederica Wilson
25th	58%	40%	Mario Díaz-Balart
26th	46%	51%	Carlos Curbelo
26th	46%	51%	Donna Shalala
27th	45%	53%	Ileana Ros-Lehtinen
27th	45%	53%	Debbie Mucarsel-Powell

== See also ==
- Florida Attorney General
