= Florida A&M University College of Law =

Public law school in Orlando, Florida, US

- Parent school: Florida A&M University
- Established: 1949
- School type: Public
- Dean: Simone Marstiller
- Location: Orlando, Florida, U.S.
- Enrollment: 529
- Faculty: 72 (40 full-time, 32 part-time)
- USNWR ranking: 147th-193rd (bottom 25%)
- Bar pass rate: 79.7% (Florida bar exam, July 2026 first-time takers)
- Website: www.law.famu.edu

Florida A&M University College of Law or FAMU College of Law is an ABA-accredited law school in Orlando, Florida, United States. It is part of Florida A&M University.

== History ==
On December 21, 1949, a division of law was established at the then Florida A&M College and the first class was admitted in 1951. The legislature established the school because no "separate but equal" state-supported law school existed for African-Americans at that time. The school's enrollment was limited to African-American male students and was located in Tallahassee, Florida. The FAMU law school was closed through a vote by the Florida legislature in 1965, with the funds transferred to a new law school at formerly all-white Florida State University; vindictiveness for FAMU activism in support of desegregation was a factor. In 1966 the institution lost the right to admit students after a decision by the Florida Board of Control, and two years later, in 1968, the last students graduated. Fifty-seven students graduated from the school between 1954 and 1968.

The 2000 Florida Legislature unanimously passed legislation establishing a College of Law for Florida A&M University to be located in Orlando and on June 14, 2000, Governor Jeb Bush signed the bill into law. The legislation included three conditions: the school was required to serve "historically underrepresented communities"; it had to open by 2003; and it had to earn ABA accreditation within five years. The College of Law admitted its first class in 2002.

The American Bar Association (ABA) granted the Florida A&M University College of Law provisional approval in August 2004, which allowed its first graduates to take the bar exam while the law school continued to work toward meeting ABA standards.

LeRoy Pernell, who was dean of the law school at Northern Illinois University, was recruited as the new dean in 2007. He fired a number of faculty and recruited 19 new faculty members. Under Pernell, the law school created its Center for International Law and Justice, and became the only historically black college accepted into the International Association of Law Schools. Full ABA accreditation was achieved in July 2009.

Today, the College of Law occupies its own 160,000-square-foot (15,000 m^{2}) building at 201 Beggs Avenue in downtown Orlando. The four-story building was designed by Rhodes+Brito Architects of Orlando. The College of Law has an onsite law library that is open to the public. The new building opened to students in 2005. Of the 1,807 who applied to the school in 2009, 630 were accepted and 234 enrolled. Seventy-seven percent of the entering class were Florida residents, and 42% were white students.

== Employment and bar passage ==
According to Florida A&M's 2016 ABA-required disclosures, 34.7% of the Class of 2015 obtained full-time, long-term, bar passage required employment ten months after graduation, excluding solo practitioners. Of the Florida A&M Law alumni who took the Florida bar exam for the first time in July 2019, 61.1% passed.

On May 15, 2020, the council of the American Bar Association’s Section of Legal Education and Admissions to the Bar met remotely and determined this school and nine others had significant noncompliance with Standard 316. This Standard was revised in 2019 to provide that at least 75% of an accredited law school’s graduates who took a bar exam must pass one within two years of graduation. The school was asked to submit a report by Feb. 1, 2021; and, if the council did not find the report demonstrated compliance, the school would be asked to appear before the council at its May, 2021 meeting. On February 26, 2021, the ABA’s council posted that the school was now in compliance with the standard.

== Costs ==
The cost of tuition at Florida A&M for the 2016–2017 academic year is $14,131.66 (Residents) and $34,034.59 (Non-Residents) for their full-time day program. The part-time evening program's tuition is $10,028.92 (Residents)and $24,153.58 (Non-Residents). According to Law School Transparency, an in-state student who uses student loans to finance their entire cost of attendance (tuition, fees, living expenses, etc.) will graduate from Florida A&M with $147,411 in student loan debt, including interest. An out of state student who uses student loans to finance their entire cost of attendance will leave Florida A&M College of Law with approximately $218,834 in student loan debt, including interest. Approximately 79.2% of students pay full sticker price, meaning they do not receive a scholarship or other grant aid.

== Law Library ==
Florida A&M University College of Law has an onsite law library that is open to the public. "The primary mission of the Florida A&M University College of Law Library is to enhance study, learning, research, and service conducted at the College of Law by providing present and future resources and services to meet the informational needs of its faculty, students, and staff. The secondary mission of the Law Library is to contribute a valuable community service by providing public access of its collections to the local legal community and to the general public."
