= Christa Calamas =

American lawyer

Secretary of the Florida Agency for Health Care Administration
- In office July 2006 – January 2007
- Governor: Jeb Bush

Personal details
- Party: Republican
- Education: University of Florida; University of Dundee; Eckerd College

Christa Calamas is a Florida lawyer and former secretary of the Florida Agency for Health Care Administration (ACHA), appointed by governor Jeb Bush in 2006 to replace previous secretary Alan Levine after he was named CEO of North Broward Hospital District. Her appointment was effective July 8, 2006. Previously Calamas was assistant general counsel of the AHCA and Bush's assistant general counsel. Since 2012, Calamas has served as staff director of the Health and Human Services Committee of the Florida House of Representatives.

Calamas received a bachelor's degree from Eckerd College, a master's degree in public policy from the University of Dundee, and her Juris Doctor from the University of Florida.

As secretary of the Agency for Health Care Administration, Calamas oversaw the state's $16 billion Medicaid funds, regulation and licensing of 32,000 healthcare facilities, and publication of health data. While Secretary, she published an op-ed about how the agency reached its 22,000 Medicaid recipients amid Medicaid reform.
