= LeRoy Pernell =

Former dean

Dean of NIU College of Law
- In office 1997–2007
- Succeeded by: Jennifer L. Rosato Perea

Dean of FAMU College of Law
- In office 2008–2015
- Succeeded by: Angela Felecia Epps

Personal details
- Education: Franklin & Marshall (B.A.); Ohio State (J.D.)
- Occupation: Professor; Lawyer; Administrator
- Website: LeRoy Pernell

LeRoy Pernell is a former dean of the Northern Illinois University College of Law and Florida A&M University College of Law.

== Legal career ==
Pernell entered academia in 1975 when he joined the faculty of Ohio State University Moritz College of Law. He also served as vice provost of the office of minority affairs at Ohio State University from 1994 to 1997.

In 1997, Pernell became the dean and professor of law at Northern Illinois University College of Law. Under Pernell's leadership, NIU Law was nationally recognized for its diversity efforts. The Princeton Review ranked NIU Law among the Top 10 law schools in the nation as having the most diverse faculty for three straight years in 2005, 2006, and 2007. In its 2007 lists of America's Best Graduate Schools, U.S. News & World Report ranked NIU Law among the top law schools for having a diverse student body. Pernell also established the clinical educational program and live client program, including the 2001 opening of the Zeke Giorgi Legal Clinic in Rockford, Illinois.

In 2008, Pernell became the dean and professor of law at Florida A&M University College of Law. Pernell, the longest serving dean of the re-established FAMU College of Law, is credited with providing the stability that led to the law school acquiring full accreditation from the American Bar Association in 2009 and full reaccreditation in 2014. In 2015, he stepped down as dean and returned to his full-time faculty position.

== Education ==
Pernell received his bachelor's degree in government from Franklin & Marshall College in 1971. He then received his Juris Doctor degree from Ohio State University Moritz College of Law in 1974. Pernell received a Franklin & Marshall College Alumni Citation award in June 2011.
