= Health board =

Health board may refer to:

- District health boards in New Zealand
- Health Board (Estonia)
- Health board (Ireland)
- Local board of health, in England and Wales from 1848 to 1894
- Local health boards in Wales
- National Board of Health (Denmark)
- NHS Scotland#Health boards
- New York City's Metropolitan Board of Health
