= Agency for Health Care Administration =

Statewide regulatory entity in Florida, US

Florida Agency for Health Care Administration
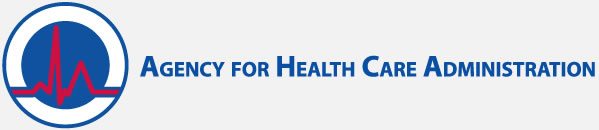

Agency overview
- Formed: 1992
- Jurisdiction: Government of Florida
- Agency executives: Shevaun Harris, Secretary; Andrew Sheeran, General Counsel; Brock Juarez, Acting Chief of Staff; Brian Langston, Inspector General
- Website: ahca.myflorida.com

The Florida Agency for Health Care Administration (AHCA) is the chief health policy and planning entity for the US state of Florida. The agency was created by the Florida Legislature as part of the Health Care Reform Act of 1992. The agency is tasked with managing the state's Medicaid program, regulating and licensing health care facilities, and publishing health data.

It has a Medicaid fraud unit that works jointly with the Medicaid fraud unit of the Florida Attorney General.

== Secretaries ==
The agency is led by a governor-appointed Secretary (formerly called director). Previous agency heads include:

| Secretary | Date appointed | Appointed by |
|---|---|---|
| Doug Cook | 1992 | |
| Rubin King-Shaw | 1999 | |
| Laura Branker | 2001 | |
| Rhonda Medows | 2001 | |
| Mary Pat Moore | 2004 | |
| Alan Levine | 2004 | |
| Christa Calamas | July 2006 | Jeb Bush |
| Andrew Agwunobi | December 2006 | |
| Holly Benson | 2008 | |
| Tom Arnold | 2009 | |
| Liz Dudek | 2010 | |
| Justin Senior | November 2016 | |
| Mary Mayhew | January 2019 | Ron DeSantis |
| Shevaun Harris | October 2020 | Ron DeSantis |
| Simone Marstiller | February 2021 | Ron DeSantis |
| Jason Weida | January 2023 | Ron DeSantis |
| Shevaun Harris | February 2025 | Ron DeSantis |
