= Simone Marstiller =

Liberian-American attorney

Dean of the Florida A&M University College of Law
- In office February 2021 – November 2022

Secretary of the Florida Department of Juvenile Justice
- In office January 2019 – 2021

Judge of the Florida First District Court of Appeal
- In office 2010–2016

Personal details
- Born: Monrovia, Liberia
- Children: 1
- Education: Stetson University (BBA, JD)
- Occupation: Attorney, former jurist, higher education leader

Simone Marstiller is an American attorney and former jurist who serves as dean of the Florida A&M University College of Law. She also served as secretary of the Florida Agency for Health Care Administration from 2021 to 2022 and secretary of the Department of Juvenile Justice from 2019 to 2021. She was a judge on the Florida First District Court of Appeal from 2010 to 2016 and held government roles under governors Jeb Bush, Charlie Crist, and Ron DeSantis.

== Early life and education ==
Marstiller was born in Monrovia, Liberia, and grew up in St. Petersburg, Florida. She earned a bachelor of business administration from Stetson University in 1988. She later obtained her J.D., cum laude, from Stetson University College of Law in 1996.

== Career ==
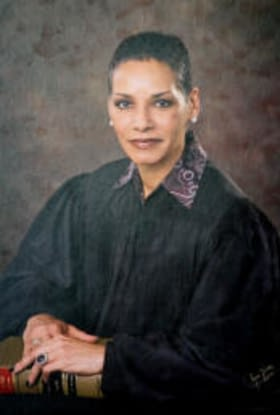
Marstiller, Florida First District Court of Appeal

In 1996, Marstiller began her legal career as a judicial law clerk at the Florida Fifth District Court of Appeal. She then served as chief appellate counsel for the Agency for Health Care Administration (AHCA), where she represented the agency in district courts of appeal on cases related to health care practitioner licensing, Medicaid provider contracts, and rule challenges.

In 2001, Marstiller became assistant general counsel to Florida governor Jeb Bush, assisting in overseeing legal operations of the executive agencies and advising on legal and policy matters. In 2002, she was appointed general counsel for the Department of Management Services, where she managed legal affairs, including government procurement, outsourcing, and state facility management. Marstiller was later appointed interim secretary of the agency.

In 2003, Marstiller returned to the governor's office as deputy chief of staff. The following year, she was appointed state chief information officer. In 2005, she became secretary of the Department of Business and Professional Regulation.

In 2007, Florida attorney general Bill McCollum appointed Marstiller associate deputy attorney general, where she oversaw divisions such as civil rights and opinions. Before her judicial appointment, she was executive director of the Florida Elections Commission. In 2010, Florida governor Charlie Crist appointed Marstiller as a judge on the First District Court of Appeal, where she served for six years. In 2017, she considered running in the 2018 Florida Attorney General election as a Republican, but ultimately declined.

After leaving the judiciary, Marstiller worked as of counsel at Gunster, Yoakley & Stewart, focusing on appellate consulting, litigation, government affairs, procurement, and ethics and election law. In January 2019, Florida governor Ron DeSantis appointed her secretary of the Department of Juvenile Justice. The Florida Senate criminal justice committee unanimously supported her confirmation in March 2019.

In February 2021, DeSantis appointed Marstiller secretary of the Agency for Health Care Administration (AHCA). The agency oversees Florida's Medicaid program, as well as licensing for hospitals, nursing homes, and other health care facilities. She stepped down from the position in November 2022. Marstiller was succeeded by Jason Weida. Marstiller was elected to Stetson University's board of trustees in May 2021. She was appointed dean of Florida A&M University's college of law effective July 1, 2026.
