= Maine Department of Health and Human Services =

Maine Health Department

Department overview
- Type: State agency
- Employees: 3000
- Department executive: Jeanne M. Lambrew, Ph.D., Commissioner
- Website: https://www.maine.gov/dhhs/

The Maine Department of Health and Human Services (DHHS) is the health department of Maine headquartered in Augusta, Maine, that provides public assistance, child and family welfare services, and oversees health policy and management. It is the largest executive branch department in Maine, employing over 3,000 people.

== Offices and divisions ==
The Maine Department of Health and Human Services comprises the following offices and divisions:

- Maine Office of Aging and Disability Services (OADS)
- Maiane Office of Behavioral Health (OBH)
- Maine Center for Disease Control and Prevention (Maine CDC)
- Maine Office of Child and Family Services (OCFS)
- Dorothea Dix Psychiatric Center (DDPC)
- Office for Family Independence (OFI)
- Maine Office of the Health Insurance Marketplace (OHIM)
- Maine Division of Licensing and Certification
- MaineCare
- Riverview Psychiatric Center (RPC)
