= Jason Weida =

American lawyer and government official

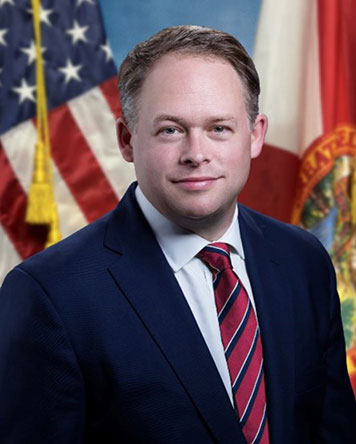
- Official portrait, 2023

Chief of Staff to the Governor of Florida
- Incumbent
- Assumed office February 17, 2025
- Governor: Ron DeSantis
- Preceded by: James Uthmeier

Secretary of the Florida Agency for Health Care Administration
- In office January 2023 – February 2025
- Governor: Ron DeSantis
- Preceded by: Simone Marstiller
- Succeeded by: Shevaun Harris

Personal details
- Born: May 1980 (age 46)
- Party: Republican
- Education: Gettysburg College (BA); University of Connecticut (JD)

Jason Weida (born May 1980) is an American attorney and government official who is the chief of staff to Florida governor Ron DeSantis since 2025. A member of the Republican Party, he previously served as secretary of the Florida Agency for Health Care Administration from 2023 to 2025.

== Education ==
Weida earned a B.A. from Gettysburg College, magna cum laude, and a J.D. from the University of Connecticut School of Law, with honors. He clerked on the U.S. District Court for the District of Rhode Island for William E. Smith, and on the Rhode Island Supreme Court for Paul Suttell. Weida later clerked on the U.S. Court of Appeals for the First Circuit for Jeffrey R. Howard.

== Career ==
Weida was a lawyer at Jones Day and Skadden, Arps, Slate, Meagher & Flom. As a litigation associate, he maintained a docket of pro bono cases and oversaw investigations in healthcare and other sectors.

Weida served as counsel in the U.S. Department of Justice's Office of Legal Policy before becoming an assistant U.S. attorney in Boston in 2016. In these roles, he coordinated with law enforcement agencies, including the Federal Bureau of Investigation (FBI) and the Drug Enforcement Administration (DEA).

In May 2020, U.S. president Donald Trump announced his intent to nominate Weida to serve as the Inspector General for the U.S. Department of Health and Human Services (HHS). His announcement came after Trump criticized acting inspector general Christi Grimm over a report on hospital shortages during the COVID-19 pandemic.

Weida joined Florida's Agency for Health Care Administration (AHCA), where he worked in Medicaid policy before being appointed chief of staff. In January 2023, he was named interim secretary of AHCA, replacing Simone Marstiller, who stepped down ahead of Florida's lobbying ban. As AHCA secretary, Weida prioritized improving maternal health outcomes, expanding childhood and teenage mental health programs, and increasing home and community-based services. He also oversaw the process of awarding multi-billion-dollar contracts for Medicaid managed-care providers, which occurs every six years. In April 2023, he was confirmed as the permanent AHCA secretary.

In 2025, Florida governor Ron DeSantis named Weida as his chief of staff, replacing James Uthmeier, who became the state's Attorney General. He was succeeded as secretary by Florida Department of Children and Families secretary Shevaun Harris.

In 2026, Weida was mentioned in relation to the Hope Florida scandal.
