= 2018 Florida elections =

A general election was held in the U.S. state of Florida on November 6, 2018. All of Florida's executive officers were up for election as well as Florida's Class I Senate seat and all 27 seats in the United States House of Representatives. Primary elections were on August 28, 2018. The Republicans took control of the U.S. Senate seat held by three-term Democrat Bill Nelson in an upset, while the Democrats picked up two House seats as well as the office of the Commissioner of Agriculture. The Republican gains in the state, despite the trend towards Democrats nationwide, were part of Florida's transition from a swing state to a red state. As of 2025, the Agriculture Commissioner race was the last time Democrats won a statewide race in Florida, and also the last time a Democrat was elected to a state agriculture commissioner position in the US.

== United States Senate ==
County results Scott: 50–60% 60–70% 70–80% 80–90% Nelson: 50–60% 60–70%

Senator Bill Nelson (D) ran for a fourth term against Governor Rick Scott (R). This ended up being the most expensive Senate race in U.S. history. Nelson was narrowly defeated by then-Governor Rick Scott.

Nelson was the only statewide Democrat to carry Monroe County.

United States Senate election in Florida, 2018
Party	Candidate	Votes	%	±%
Republican	Rick Scott	4,099,505	50.06%	+7.82%
Democratic	Bill Nelson (incumbent)	4,089,472	49.93%	−5.30%
Write-in		607	<0.01%	N/A
Total votes		8,190,005	100%	N/A
Republican gain from Democratic				

== United States House of Representatives ==
Florida elects 27 U.S. Representatives from its congressional districts. Democrat Donna Shalala defeated Maria Elvira Salazar to succeed retiring Republican congresswoman Ileana Ros-Lehtinen in the 27th District and Debbie Mucarsel-Powell defeated incumbent Republican congressman Carlos Curbelo in the 26th District. This changed Florida's congressional delegation from a 16–11 Republican majority to a narrow 14–13 majority.

Results of the 2018 United States House of Representatives elections in Florida by district:

District	Republican		Democratic		Others		Total		Result
District	Votes	%	Votes	%	Votes	%	Votes	%	Result
District 1	216,189	67.06%	106,199	32.94%	0	0.00%	322,388	100.00%	Republican hold
District 2	199,335	67.44%	96,233	32.56%	0	0.00%	295,568	100.00%	Republican hold
District 3	176,616	57.62%	129,880	42.38%	0	0.00%	306,496	100.00%	Republican hold
District 4	248,420	65.16%	123,351	32.35%	9,478	2.49%	381,249	100.00%	Republican hold
District 5	89,799	33.22%	180,527	66.78%	0	0.00	270,326	100.00%	Democratic hold
District 6	187,891	56.31%	145,758	43.69%	0	0.00%	333,649	100.00%	Republican hold
District 7	134,285	42.31%	183,113	57.69%	0	0.00%	317,398	100.00%	Democratic hold
District 8	218,112	60.50%	142,415	39.50%	0	0.00%	360,527	100.00%	Republican hold
District 9	124,565	41.98%	172,172	58.02%	0	0.00%	296,737	100.00%	Democratic hold
District 10	–	–	–	–	–	–	–	–	Democratic hold
District 11	239,395	65.14%	128,053	34.84%	58	0.02%	367,506	100.00%	Republican hold
District 12	194,564	58.09%	132,844	39.66%	7,510	2.24%	334,918	100.00%	Republican hold
District 13	134,254	42.36%	182,717	57.64%	0	0.00%	316,971	100.00%	Democratic hold
District 14	–	–	–	–	–	–	–	–	Democratic hold
District 15	151,380	53.02%	134,132	46.98%	20	0.01%	285,532	100.00%	Republican hold
District 16	197,483	54.56%	164,463	45.44%	0	0.00%	361,946	100.00%	Republican hold
District 17	193,326	62.26%	117,194	37.74%	0	0.00%	310,520	100.00%	Republican hold
District 18	185,905	54.30%	156,454	45.70%	0	0.00%	342,359	100.00%	Republican hold
District 19	211,465	62.27%	128,106	37.72%	36	0.01%	339,607	100.00%	Republican hold
District 20	0	0.00%	202,659	99.92%	165	0.08%	202,824	100.00%	Democratic hold
District 21	–	–	–	–	–	–	–	–	Democratic hold
District 22	113,049	37.98%	184,634	62.02%	0	0.00%	297,683	100.00%	Democratic hold
District 23	99,446	35.98%	161,611	58.48%	15,309	5.54%	276,366	100.00%	Democratic hold
District 24	–	–	–	–	–	–	–	–	Democratic hold
District 25	128,672	60.45%	84,173	39.55%	0	0.00%	212,845	100.00%	Republican hold
District 26	115,678	49.13%	119,797	50.87%	0	0.00%	235,475	100.00%	Democratic gain
District 27	115,588	45.76%	130,743	51.76%	6,255	2.48%	252,586	100.00%	Democratic gain
Total	3,675,417	52.35%	3,307,228	47.10%	38,831	0.55%	7,021,476	100.00%	

== Governor ==
County results DeSantis: 50–60% 60–70% 70–80% 80–90% Gillum: 50–60% 60–70%

Then-incumbent Republican governor Rick Scott (since 2011) was term-limited and prohibited from seeking a third consecutive term. Democratic mayor of Tallahassee Andrew Gillum ran against Republican former U.S. Representative Ron DeSantis. DeSantis narrowly defeated Gillum.

2018 Florida gubernatorial election
Party	Candidate	Votes	%	±%
Republican	Ron DeSantis / Jeanette Nuñez	4,076,186	49.59%	+1.45%
Democratic	Andrew Gillum / Chris King	4,043,723	49.19%	+2.12%
Reform	Darcy G. Richardson / Nancy Argenziano	47,140	0.57%	N/A
Independent	Kyle "KC" Gibson / Ellen Wilds	24,310	0.30%	N/A
Independent	Ryan Christopher Foley / John Tutton Jr.	14,630	0.18%	N/A
Independent	Bruce Stanley / Ryan Howard McJury	14,505	0.18%	N/A
n/a	Write-ins	67	0.00%	N/A
Total votes		8,220,561	100.0%	N/A
Republican hold				

== Attorney general ==
County results Moody: 40–50% 50–60% 60–70% 70–80% 80–90% Shaw: 50–60% 60–70%

Incumbent Republican Florida Attorney General Pam Bondi (since 2011) was term-limited and prohibited from seeking a third consecutive term. Ashley Moody, former judge for the Thirteenth Judicial Circuit of Florida, defeated state representative Frank White to win the Republican nomination. Sean Shaw, a state representative, defeated attorney Ryan Torrens to win the Democratic nomination. Moody defeated Shaw by approximately 6 percentage points, giving her the largest margin of any Republican candidate for the 2018 elections.

Florida Attorney General election, 2018
Party	Candidate	Votes	%	±%
Republican	Ashley Moody	4,232,532	52.11%	−2.99%
Democratic	Sean Shaw	3,744,912	46.10%	+4.09%
Independent	Jeffrey Marc Siskind	145,296	1.79%	N/A
Total votes		8,122,740	100.0%	N/A
Republican hold				

== Chief Financial Officer ==
County results Patronis: 50-60% 60-70% 70-80% 80-90% Ring: 50–60% 60–70%

Incumbent Republican Chief Financial Officer of Florida Jimmy Patronis was appointed to the office in June 2017 and sought a full term in 2018. Patronis won a full term and defeated former state senator Jeremy Ring by approximately 3 percentage points.

Florida Chief Financial Officer election, 2018
Party	Candidate	Votes	%	±%
Republican	Jimmy Patronis (incumbent)	4,152,221	51.74%	−7.19%
Democratic	Jeremy Ring	3,872,540	48.26%	+7.19%
Total votes		8,025,058	100.0%	N/A
Republican hold				

== Commission of Agriculture ==
County results Fried: 50–60% 60–70% Caldwell: 50–60% 60–70% 70–80% 80–90%

Incumbent Republican Florida Commissioner of Agriculture Adam Putnam (since 2011) was term-limited and prohibited from seeking a third consecutive term. State representative Matt Caldwell ran against lobbyist attorney Nikki Fried. Fried became the only statewide elected Democrat from Florida following the 2018 election.

2018 Florida Commissioner of Agriculture election
Party	Candidate	Votes	%	±%
Democratic	Nikki Fried	4,032,954	50.04%	+8.71%
Republican	Matt Caldwell	4,026,201	49.96%	−8.71%
Total votes		8,059,155	100.00%	N/A
Democratic gain from Republican				

== State legislature ==
Half of the seats of the Florida Senate and all of the seats of the Florida House of Representatives were up for election in 2018. Republicans retained control of both chambers.

Florida Senate
Party	Before	After	Change
Republican	24	23	▼1
Democratic	16	17	▲1
Total	40	40	

Florida House of Representatives
Party	Before	After	Change
Republican	78	73	▼5
Democratic	42	47	▲5
Total	120	120	

== Constitutional amendments ==
Florida voters voted on 12 constitutional amendments. An amendment requires sixty percent to pass. Amendment 8 was removed from the ballot before the elections.

Amendment	Name	Summary	Sponsor	Notes	Results
1	Increased Homestead Property Tax Exemption	Proposing an amendment to the State Constitution to increase the homestead exemption by exempting the assessed valuation of homestead property greater than $100,000 and up to $125,000 for all levies other than school district levies. The amendment shall take effect January 1, 2019.	The Florida Legislature/House (HJR7105)		Failed to pass 58%–42%
2	Limitations on Property Tax Assessments	Proposing an amendment to the State Constitution to permanently retain provisions currently in effect, which limit property tax assessment increases on specified nonhomestead real property, except for school district taxes, to 10 percent each year. If approved, the amendment removes the scheduled repeal of such provisions in 2019 and shall take effect January 1, 2019.	The Florida Legislature/House (CS/HJR 21)		Passed 66%–34%
3	Voter Control of Gambling in Florida	This amendment ensures that Florida voters shall have the exclusive right to decide whether to authorize casino gambling by requiring that in order for casino gambling to be authorized under Florida law, it must be approved by Florida voters pursuant to Article XI, Section 3 of the Florida Constitution. Affects articles X and XI. Defines casino gambling and clarifies that this amendment does not conflict with federal law regarding state/tribal compacts.	Voters In Charge		Passed 71%–29%
4	Voting Restoration Amendment	This amendment restores the voting rights of Floridians with felony convictions after they complete all terms of their sentence including parole or probation. The amendment would not apply to those convicted of murder or sexual offenses, who would continue to be permanently barred from voting unless the governor and Cabinet vote to restore their voting rights on a case-by-case basis.	Floridians for a Fair Democracy, Inc.		Passed 65%–35%
5	Supermajority Vote Required to Impose, Authorize, or Raise State Taxes or Fees	Prohibits the legislature from imposing, authorizing, or raising a state tax or fee except through legislation approved by a two-thirds vote of each house of the legislature in a bill containing no other subject. This proposal does not authorize a state tax or fee otherwise prohibited by the Constitution and does not apply to fees or taxes imposed or authorized to be imposed by a county, municipality, school board, or special district.	The Florida Legislature/House (HJR7001)		Passed 66%–34%
6	Rights of Crime Victims; Judges	Creates constitutional rights for victims of crime; requires courts to facilitate victims’ rights; authorizes victims to enforce their rights throughout criminal and juvenile justice processes. Requires judges and hearing officers to independently interpret statutes and rules rather than deferring to government agency's interpretation. Raises mandatory retirement age of state justices and judges from seventy to seventy-five years; deletes authorization to complete judicial term if one-half of term has been served by retirement age.	Constitution Revision Commission		Passed 62%–38%
7	First Responder and Military Member Survivor Benefits; Public Colleges and Universities	Grants mandatory payment of death benefits and waiver of certain educational expenses to qualifying survivors of certain first responders and military members who die performing official duties. Requires supermajority votes by university trustees and state university system board of governors to raise or impose all legislatively authorized fees if law requires approval by those bodies. Establishes existing state college system as constitutional entity; provides governance structure.	Constitution Revision Commission	Amendment was subject to litigation and the Florida Supreme Court has yet to rule on their constitutionality.	Passed 66%–34%
9	Prohibits Offshore Oil and Gas Drilling; Prohibits Vaping in Enclosed Indoor Workplaces	Prohibits drilling for the exploration or extraction of oil and natural gas beneath all state-owned waters between the mean high water line and the state's outermost territorial boundaries. Adds use of vapor-generating electronic devices to current prohibition of tobacco smoking in enclosed indoor workplaces with exceptions; permits more restrictive local vapor ordinances.	Constitution Revision Commission	Amendment was subject to litigation and the Florida Supreme Court has yet to rule on their constitutionality.	Passed 69%–31%
10	State and Local Government Structure and Operation	Requires legislature to retain department of veterans’ affairs. Ensures election of sheriffs, property appraisers, supervisors of elections, tax collectors, and clerks of court in all counties; removes county charters’ ability to abolish, change term, transfer duties, or eliminate election of these offices. Changes annual legislative session commencement date in even-numbered years from March to January; removes legislature's authorization to fix another date. Creates office of domestic security and counterterrorism within department of law enforcement	Constitution Revision Commission		Passed 63%–37%
11	Property Rights; Removal of Obsolete Provision; Criminal Statutes	Removes discriminatory language related to real property rights. Removes obsolete language repealed by voters. Deletes provision that amendment of a criminal statute will not affect prosecution or penalties for a crime committed before the amendment; retains current provision allowing prosecution of a crime committed before the repeal of a criminal statute.	Constitution Revision Commission	Amendment was subject to litigation and the Florida Supreme Court has yet to rule on their constitutionality.	Passed 62%–38%
12	Lobbying and Abuse of Office by Public Officers	Expands current restrictions on lobbying for compensation by former public officers; creates restrictions on lobbying for compensation by serving public officers and former justices and judges; provides exceptions; prohibits abuse of a public position by public officers and employees to obtain a personal benefit.	Constitution Revision Commission		Passed 79%–21%
13	Ends Dog Racing	Phases out commercial dog racing in connection with wagering by 2020. Other gaming activities are not affected.	Constitution Revision Commission		Passed 69%–31%

Amendment 1 results by county No: 50–60%; Yes: 70–80%; 60–70%; 50–60%

Amendment 2 results by county Yes: 70–80%; 60–70%; 50–60%; No: 50–60%

Amendment 3 results by county Yes: 70–80%; 60–70%

Amendment 4 results by county Yes: 70–80%; 60–70%; 50–60%; No: 50–60%

Amendment 5 results by county Yes: 70–80%; 60–70%; 50–60%; No: 50–60%

Amendment 6 results by county Yes: 70–80%; 60–70%; 50–60%; No: 50–60%

Amendment 7 results by county Yes: 70–80%; 60–70%; 50–60%

Amendment 9 results by county Yes: 70–80%; 60–70%; 50–60%; No: 50–60%

Amendment 10 results by county Yes: 70–80%; 60–70%; 50–60%; No: 50–60%

Amendment 11 results by county Yes: 60–70%; 50–60%; No: 50–60%

Amendment 12 results by county Yes: 80–90%; 70–80%; 60–70%

Amendment 13 results by county Yes: 70–80%; 60–70%; 50–60%; No: 60–70%; 50–60%
