= 2018 Florida Amendment 4 =

Successful referendum on restoring certain felons' right to vote

- November 6, 2018
- Voting Rights Restoration for Felons Initiative

Results
Choice	Votes	%
Yes	5,148,926	64.55%
No	2,828,339	35.45%
Valid votes	7,977,265	96.04%
Invalid or blank votes	328,664	3.96%
Total votes	8,305,929	100.00%
Registered voters/turnout	13,278,070	62.55%

For
90–100%
80–90%
70–80%
60–70%
50–60%
Against
90–100%
80–90%
70–80%
60–70%
50–60%
Other
Tie
No data

Florida Amendment 4, also the Voting Rights Restoration for Felons Initiative, is an amendment to the constitution of the U.S. state of Florida passed by ballot initiative on November 6, 2018, as part of the 2018 Florida elections. The proposition restored the voting rights of Floridians with felony convictions after they complete all terms of their sentence including parole or probation. The amendment does not apply to Floridians convicted of murder or sexual offenses.

The campaign was sponsored by the Florida Rights Restoration Coalition and had support from the American Civil Liberties Union, Christian Coalition of America, and Freedom Partners. Among politicians who took a side on the amendment, several Democrats supported the measure, while some Republicans opposed it. Amendment 4 passed with 64.55% of voters in favor. In January 2019, an estimated 1.4 million ex-felons became eligible to vote. However, a series of court rulings culminating in a September 2020 11th Circuit appeals court decision restricted re-enfranchisement to only those who had paid off their fines.

== Background ==
In 2016, 6.1 million adults in the United States could not vote due to felony disenfranchisement laws. Prior to 2018, Florida was one of four U.S. states that enacted permanent felony disenfranchisement, affecting 1.7 million felons. The other three states were Kentucky, Tennessee, and Virginia. Felons were required to wait five to seven years after the completion of their sentence before they could apply to have their voting rights restored by the State Board of Executive Clemency, which is composed of the Governor of Florida and the Florida Cabinet, and meets four times per year at the Florida State Capitol in Tallahassee, Florida. Florida's disenfranchised felons constituted 10% of the adult population, and 21.5% of the adult African American population.

As Governor of Florida, Charlie Crist reformed the process for the reinstatement of voting rights in 2007, allowing non-violent offenders to have their voting rights automatically restored. Over 155,000 applications for voting right restoration were approved during Crist's four-year term. Shortly after succeeding Crist as governor, Rick Scott, with the advice of Florida Attorney General Pam Bondi, ended the automatic restoration for felons convicted of non-violent crimes in the state and instituted a mandatory five-year wait period before felons could apply to the State Board of Executive Clemency for restoration of voting rights. During the first seven years of Scott's tenure, 3,000 applications were approved.

Seven former felons filed a lawsuit against the state of Florida in the United States District Court for the Northern District of Florida in March 2017. The plaintiffs in the case, Hand v. Scott, alleged the process is unconstitutional due to its arbitrary nature. In April 2018, U.S. District Judge Mark E. Walker ruled that Florida's process for seeking restoration of voting rights in Florida was unconstitutional because it relied too much on personal appeal to Governor Scott. The state appealed to the United States Court of Appeals for the Eleventh Circuit, which stayed Walker's ruling pending appeal. An analysis conducted by The Palm Beach Post demonstrated that Scott discriminated against African Americans in re-enfranchisement hearings and favored Republicans.

== Campaign ==
Desmond Meade, who was convicted of a felony and earned a law degree after his release, became involved in voting rights after his wife ran for the Florida Legislature and he could not vote for her. He became the head of the Florida Rights Restoration Coalition in 2009. He led a drive to qualify Amendment 4 as a ballot initiative for the 2018 Florida elections, collecting 799,000 signatures. The initiative was approved in January 2018 for the November ballot. The amendment required 60% of the vote to take effect.

Demetrius Jifunza became an outspoken advocate for Amendment 4 and involved in voting rights after his voting rights were stripped in 1995 due to a felony conviction. He went on to become a paralegal. Jifunza founded the Sarasota Chapter of the Florida Rights Restoration Coalition and is the Vice President, Sarasota, Florida Chapter NAACP and led the successful media campaign to help pass Amendment 4.

The FRRC partnered with the American Civil Liberties Union and the Christian Coalition of America during the campaign. Freedom Partners, a nonprofit group funded in part by the Koch brothers, also supported the amendment. Some Democratic Party politicians, including Crist, Andrew Gillum, Gwen Graham, Al Lawson, and Alan Williams supported Amendment 4, while some Republican politicians, including Ron DeSantis, Adam Putnam, and Richard Corcoran, opposed it.

== Text ==
As it appeared on the Florida ballot on November 6, 2018, the text of the amendment read:

No. 4 Constitutional Amendment Article VI, Section 4. Voting Restoration Amendment This amendment restores the voting rights of Floridians with felony convictions after they complete all terms of their sentence including parole or probation. The amendment would not apply to those convicted of murder or sexual offenses, who would continue to be permanently barred from voting unless the Governor and Cabinet vote to restore their voting rights on a case by case basis.

The full text of the constitutional amendment was available to voters in a booklet provided by the Florida Division of Elections. A 60 percent vote in favor was required for approval.

== Results ==
Florida Amendment 4 (2018)
Choice	Votes	%
Yes	5,148,926	64.55%
No	2,828,339	35.45%
Total votes	7,977,265	100.00%
Registered voters and turnout	13,278,070	62.55%

== Implementation ==
The amendment went into effect on January 8, 2019, making an estimated 1.4 million people with felony convictions eligible to register to vote.

Some proponents claim that Amendment 4 was written as not to require implementation by the Florida Legislature. The Florida Division of Elections stopped running applicants through the criminal database in December. DeSantis, who defeated Gillum in the 2018 Florida gubernatorial election, stated his belief that the legislature must pass a law to allow the Division of Elections to verify the eligibility of each applicant. Bill Galvano, the president of the Florida Senate, is of the opinion that it is "self-executing."

In mid-2019, Republican Governor DeSantis signed a bill into law. Originating in the Florida Senate, SB 7066, it required that "people with felony records pay 'all fines and fees' associated with their sentence prior to the restoration of their voting rights". According to one commentator, this legislation "subverts" Amendment 4. On October 18, 2019, Judge Robert Hinkle of the United States District Court for the Northern District of Florida issued a limited stay but only as far as the law applied to the plaintiffs themselves. DeSantis appealed the decision of the District court to the 11th US Circuit Court of Appeals. On January 16, 2020, the Florida Supreme Court held that the law is constitutional. The Court of Appeals declined to block the District Court's decision.

On May 24, 2020, US District Court Judge Robert Hinkle ruled that parts of the law were constitutional and parts were unconstitutional. He ordered the state to take various actions. He ruled that the Florida law requiring felons to pay legal fees, fines, and restitution to their victims as part of their sentences before regaining the vote is unconstitutional but only for those unable to pay the amounts. The law could continue to be applied to those with the means to pay their fines/fees and restitution. However, defining those unable to pay, the ruling broadly creates two categories: those who were appointed an attorney because they could not afford one and anyone whose financial obligations were converted to civil liens.

The broadness of these categories would de facto make nearly all felons eligible to vote, as the Tampa Bay Times found most felons are appointed attorneys and nearly all have their court fees and fines converted to liens. Hinkle acknowledged the "overwhelming majority" of felons would be found unable to pay under these categories. He also ordered the state to make the related changes to the state voter registration form and create a process in which felons could formally request an advisory opinion on how much they owe, and election officials would have to respond within three weeks or the felon would be allowed to register to vote by default.

In the case of a loss on the constitutional claims, the state had made two main secondary arguments at trial. The state argued that if the ballot initiative's language requiring all felons to complete their sentences was unconstitutional in part or in whole, the entire amendment needed to be struck down, as it was nonseverable. Hinkle ruled against the state on the issue of severability and stated that his order was a justifiable exercise of the courts discretion to provide relief. Hinkle rejected the state's argument that the amendment would need to be thrown out, as the ruling would radically redefine what voters thought they were approving in 2018, with nearly all felons eligible without paying fines/fees/restitution, ruling that he believes Florida voters would have "adhered to a generous spirit that led to passage of the amendment" and pointed to the fact that only some of the promotional material for the amendment explicitly mentioned fines and restitution.

On September 11, 2020, the United States Court of Appeals for the Eleventh Circuit overturned the lower court ruling. The en banc majority, in an opinion by Chief Judge William H. Pryor Jr., found that the requirement for felons to pay fines did not violate the equal protection clause of the Fourteenth Amendment and so they could not vote unless they had paid the fees and fines. Furthermore, the majority found that because the fines were punitive, they were not a poll tax in violation of the Twenty-fourth Amendment. Circuit Judge Beverly B. Martin, joined by Judges Wilson, Adalberto Jordan, and Jill A. Pryor, dissented.

== See also ==
- Felon disenfranchisement in Florida
