= Felony disenfranchisement in Florida =

Felony disenfranchisement in Florida is currently a contentious political issue in Florida. Though the general principle of felony disenfranchisement is not in dispute, the disenfranchisement of people who had been convicted of a felony and have served their sentence — that includes prison, bail and parole — but continue being barred from voting if they have outstanding fines, fees or restitution obligations is in contention. Prior to January 8, 2019, when Amendment 4 came into effect, people convicted of a felony effectively lost their right to vote for life, as it could only be restored by the governor as an act of clemency, which rarely occurred. Florida was one of four states with a lifetime ban, the others being Iowa, Kentucky and Virginia.

On November 6, 2018, 65% of Florida voters approved Amendment 4, which automatically restores the voting rights of people convicted of a felony—except murder or sexual offenses—after the completion of their sentences. In July 2019, however, Republicans in Florida's state legislature enacted Senate bill 7066, which requires ex-felons (who have served their sentences) to pay off all outstanding fines, fees, and restitutions before regaining their right to vote. This law disenfranchised around 774,000 people because of outstanding financial obligations. In May 2020, a federal district court judge found that SB7066 was unconstitutional for those unable to pay, or unable to find out how much they owe, a ruling overturned in September 2020 on appeal. In Florida about 1.6 million people are disenfranchised because of a current or previous felony conviction, over 10% of the voting age citizens, including the 774,000 disenfranchised only because of outstanding financial obligations. Many of these disenfranchised felons are African Americans and presumed, if they were to vote, to be Democratic voters. In late September 2020, former New York City mayor Michael Bloomberg and the Florida Rights Restoration Coalition paid the outstanding fines and fees of around 32,000 felons in Florida to enable them to vote in the 2020 elections.

== History ==
Felony disenfranchisement was introduced in Florida in 1838 with the ratification of the first Constitution of Florida, which stated “laws shall be made by the General Assembly, to exclude from office, and from suffrage, those who shall have been or may thereafter be convicted of bribery, perjury, forgery, or other high crime, or misdemeanor”, which took effect in 1845 when Florida became a U.S. state, and remained largely intact until 2007, despite notable wording changes in 1868 and 1968.

During the 1868 state constitutional convention, Florida overhauled its constitution, and expanded the felon voting section to say, “nor shall any person convicted of a felony be qualified to vote at any election unless restored to civil rights… the Legislature shall have power and shall enact the necessary laws to exclude from every office of honor, power, trust, or profit, civil or military, within the State, and from the right of suffrage, all persons convicted of bribery, perjury, larceny, or of an infamous crime.” Although minor, this rewrite was the first instance of the word “felony” in official documents to describe actions that warrant exclusion from voting rights.

There were no reform efforts of note nor any changes to the felon voting section of the constitution until 1968, where the section was simplified to include only felonies as reasons to ban criminals from voting; with bribery, perjury, larceny, and infamous crimes being omitted. This version of the law stood until 2007.

In 1974, the Florida Legislature passed a bill that would allow people who had previously been convicted of a felony to regain the right to vote upon the conclusion of their sentences. However, the Supreme Court of Florida ruled that the bill was unconstitutional because it bypassed the governor’s clemency power. Though many spoke out throughout the rest of the 20th century, this remained the only real attempt at reform until the 21st century.

On September 22, 2000, the Brennan Center for Justice represented eight people who had been previously convicted of felony crimes that filed a civil complaint against the state of Florida claiming its implementation of felony disenfranchisement violated the federal Voting Rights Act of 1965 as well as the First, Fourteenth, Fifteenth, and Twenty-fourth amendments of the U.S. Constitution. The U.S. Court of Appeals for the Eleventh Circuit in Johnson v. Bush ruled in 2005 that the felony disenfranchisement law was valid.

On April 5, 2007, Florida's Republican Governor Charlie Crist was able to get legislation passed to enable people previously convicted of felony crimes to regain the right to vote if approved by the Parole Commission. Crist intended this reform to include automatic reinstatement for all people who had been previously convicted of felony crimes other than murder or violent sex crimes.

However, other public officials at the time felt the reform was too lenient on criminals. This reform ultimately allowed over 150,000 people who had been previously convicted of felony crimes to regain the right to vote. In March 2011, Republican Governor Rick Scott reversed the 2007 reforms. Felons were not able to apply to the court for restoration of voting rights until seven years after completion of sentence, probation and parole.

On February 1, 2018, federal judge Mark E. Walker ruled that Florida’s process of choosing which people previously convicted of felony crimes should have their voting rights restored was unconstitutional. Walker argued that Florida’s system for re-enfranchisement is too broad for interpretation. As such, Walker claimed the decision to reinstate voting rights falls within the personal discretion of the governor and the clemency board, potentially allowing for personal bias to influence decisions.

During the November 6, 2018 election, Floridians voted 65% in favor of Amendment 4, an amendment to the state constitution to automatically restore voting rights to convicted felons who have served their sentences. Lifetime bans continued to apply for those convicted of murder or sexual offenses. The amendment went into effect on January 8, 2019, making an estimated 1.4 million people with felony convictions eligible to register to vote. In July 2019, Republicans in Florida's state legislature enacted Senate bill 7066, that declared that felons must pay all outstanding fines, fees and restitutions before they are deemed to have “served their sentence”, and thus regaining their right to vote.

On February 19, 2020, a three-judge panel of the Eleventh Circuit Federal Appeals Court ruled that it was unconstitutional to require felons to first pay off their financial obligations before being permitted to register to vote. In May 2020, a federal district court judge found that SB7066 was unconstitutional for those unable to pay, or unable to find out how much they owe. It has been estimated that Florida had 774,000 disenfranchised felons barred because of financial obligations.

On September 11, 2020 the United States Court of Appeals for the Eleventh Circuit sitting en banc overturned the lower court ruling, saying that the requirement for felons to pay fines did not violate the Equal Protection Clause of the Fourteenth Amendment to the United States Constitution, in effect again disenfranchising more than three-quarters of a million people just months before the 2020 U.S. presidential elections. Furthermore, the majority found that because the fines were punitive, they were not a poll tax in violation of the Twenty-fourth Amendment.

In late September 2020, former New York City mayor Michael Bloomberg put together a fund of over $16 million to be used towards helping convicted felons vote in Florida by paying their outstanding fines and fees. Bloomberg's fund as well as $5 million raised by the Florida Rights Restoration Coalition paid off outstanding fines of around 32,000 felons.

== Statistics ==
According to 2016 research by The Sentencing Project:

- 10.43% of the Florida population is disenfranchised
- 1,686,318 total Floridians are disenfranchised.
- Florida has the most disenfranchised citizens in the United States.
- Florida has the highest disenfranchisement rate in the United States.
- 23.3% of black voters in Florida cannot vote because of felony disenfranchisement.

By 2020 the Tampa Bay Times reported that despite the passage of Amendment 4:

- More than 900,000 Floridians with certain felony convictions remain unable to vote because of unpaid court fines and/or fees.
- Florida is home to about 20% of all American citizens who cannot vote because of felony disenfranchisement.
- About 15% of the state's African American population cannot vote because of felony disenfranchisement, as compared to about 6% of the state's White population.

== Felony classifications ==
In Florida a felony is defined as any criminal offense that is potentially punishable by imprisonment in a state correctional facility. Felonies are broken down into five categories,

- Capital felonies: felony offenses that are punishable by death.
- Life felonies: Offenses that carry a potential sentence of life in prison.
- First degree felonies: Offenses punishable by a maximum of thirty years of incarceration in a state correctional facility.
- Second degree felonies: Offenses punishable by a maximum of fifteen years of incarceration in a state correctional facility.
- Third degree felonies: Offenses punishable by a maximum of five years of incarceration in a state correctional facility.

== See also ==
- Felony disenfranchisement in the United States
