= Amos Robinson and Abron Scott =

Pair of serial killers incarcerated in Florida

Amos Robinson
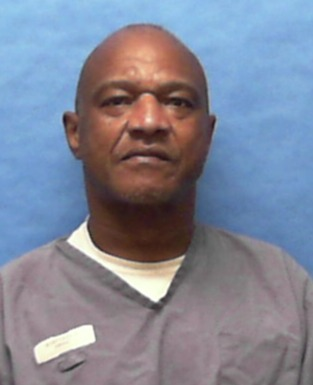
- Born: Amos Earl Robinson; August 5, 1963 (age 63); Graceville, Florida, U.S.
- Status: Incarcerated
- Convictions: 1984; First-degree murder; 2000; Second-degree murder; 2006; Second-degree murder
- Penalty: 1984; Death, commuted to life imprisonment; 2000; Life imprisonment; 2006; Life imprisonment

Details
- Victims: 3 confirmed, 3 suspected
- Date: 1983–2004
- Location: Florida
- Imprisoned at: Union Correctional Institution

Abron Scott
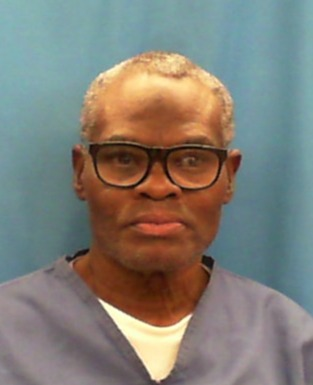
- Born: Abron Scott Jr. April 20, 1965 (age 61); West Tampa, Florida, U.S.
- Status: Incarcerated
- Convictions: 1984; First-degree murder; 2024; First-degree murder (×2)
- Penalty: 1984; Death, commuted to life imprisonment; 2024; Life imprisonment (×2)

Details
- Victims: 3
- Date: July - October 1983
- Location: Florida
- Imprisoned at: Jefferson Correctional Institution

Amos Earl Robinson (born August 5, 1963) and Abron Scott Jr. (born April 20, 1965) are a pair of American serial killers involved in at least three murders in the 1980s. The pair were first charged with the kidnapping and murder of Carlos Orellana in 1983, and they were convicted and sentenced to death, but their sentences were commuted to life in prison.

During his incarceration, Robinson and his brother were charged in 1991 with the 1983 murder of Hermenia Castro, but due to insufficient evidence, they did not stand trial. Robinson was also charged with killing two fellow prisoners, Arturi Verra and Sang Thanh Nguyen, in 1998 and 2004 respectively, and received two additional life sentences.

In 2022, DNA testing linked Robinson and Scott to the murders of Linda Lansen and Barbara Grams. The investigation into Grams's murder was notable because Robert DuBoise had been wrongfully convicted of the crime. DuBoise was exonerated after serving 37 years of a life sentence for Grams's murder. Both Robinson and Scott were charged with the murders of Lansen and Grams. Scott pleaded guilty and was sentenced to two consecutive life sentences, while Robinson is awaiting trial as of 2026, and the prosecution is seeking the death penalty.

== Early life ==
=== Abron Scott ===
Born on April 20, 1965, Abron Scott grew up in North Boulevard Homes, a West Tampa housing project, amid poverty, violence, and family instability. He was bullied because of his misshapen skull and suffered several serious injuries, including being pushed from a car as a toddler and being knocked unconscious with a baseball bat at age nine. His mother's alcohol abuse also shaped his childhood; Scott and his siblings drank leftover alcohol and sometimes had to restrain their mother during convulsions. He often went to school drunk, and his mother's boyfriends abused him.

As a teenager, Scott reconnected with his father, a pastor in Cocoa, and joined the high school wrestling team before dropping out. He had significant educational and cognitive difficulties, with an IQ reportedly in the 50s or 60s. He later lived with his sister in Oldsmar and worked various jobs, but became involved with drugs such as cocaine and "black beauties". His drug use became a major reason behind his paranoia and fighting. At 16, Scott was jailed for robbery. During his time in juvenile prison, Scott met Amos Robinson, who would become his friend and his accomplice in a 1983 murder case.

=== Amos Robinson ===
Amos Robinson was born on August 5, 1963. Unlike Scott, Robinson grew up in a somewhat stable, middle-class family in Graceville. His mother worked at a lumber mill, and he participated in track and youth baseball. Despite this stability, he showed disturbing behavior from an early age, including attacking his sister with a glass vase and cruelty toward animals and other children. At 14, he moved to Tampa to live with his father. By 15, he had committed purse snatching, and at 17, he committed robbery. While in adult prison, he assaulted another detainee and was later convicted of rape and sentenced to two years in prison. Reports showed that after he befriended Scott in juvenile prison, Robinson often protected him from other inmates.

After prison, Robinson initially appeared to be rebuilding his life, securing steady work at a cafeteria and earning his manager's trust. However, he continued associating with Scott. After Scott lost his job, the two spent more time together, drinking, using drugs, fighting in bars, and taking money from people by force.

== 1983 murder spree ==
=== Linda Lansen ===
In July 1983, in Town 'n' Country, Florida, Linda Toni Lansen became the first presumed victim killed by both Scott and Robinson. The 41-year-old freelance photographer's body was found severely beaten and lying in the vegetation along a highway, a day after she left her apartment but never came back home. Reports indicated that Lansen was shot multiple times in her head with a small-caliber gun, which led to her death, and Lansen was raped before she was murdered. At the time of her murder, Lansen had a seven-year-old daughter. Lansen's purse was discovered near a creek in Clearwater, while her vehicle was found by police on a residential street in Tampa.

Lansen's murder remained unsolved for 39 years before the Hillsborough County cold case investigators linked Scott and Robinson to the case based on DNA testing results. According to publicly released details of the results, a fingerprint on the interior of Lansen's car window was matched to Scott.

=== Barbara Grams ===
On the morning of August 19, 1983, 19-year-old Barbara Grams, the second presumed victim of Scott and Robinson, was found murdered behind a dentist's office in Tampa, Florida. Grams was believed to have been attacked while walking home from her job at the Tampa Bay Center the night before. When her body was discovered, Grams was shown to be badly beaten and had a bite mark on her body, and according to a medical examiner, the victim died of two blows to the head from a blunt instrument. The autopsy report concluded that the bite mark was likely left around the presumed time of death, and semen was found inside her vaginal area, proving that Grams was raped.

In October 1983, two months after Grams's murder, the police arrested Robert DuBoise as a suspect behind the murder. DuBoise was believed to the killer after a dentist specializing in forensic odontology matched the bite mark to the stone cast model modeled after DuBoise's teeth and his beeswax impressions, and a prisoner testified that he heard DuBoise confess to robbing Grams of her purse and having sexual intercourse with Grams, who was beaten to death by his friend and brother with boards. The dental expert testified about the dental results that linked DuBoise to the murder.

DuBoise was convicted of first-degree murder and attempted sexual battery in early 1985, and despite the jury's unanimous recommendation for life imprisonment, Judge Harry Lee Coe III overrode the jury's decision and sentenced DuBoise to the death penalty in March 1985. Two years later, the Florida Supreme Court commuted DuBoise's death sentence to life imprisonment upon his appeal in February 1987, a ruling later upheld in February 1988.

Throughout the legal process and his imprisonment, DuBoise maintained he was innocent of the crime, and in later years, the conviction of DuBoise was called into question due to the lack of physical evidence to connect DuBoise to the crime apart from the bite mark evidence. The testimony of the informant was later found to be false, and the bite mark evidence was discredited.

In 2018, State Attorney Andrew H. Warren established the Conviction Review Unit, an investigation section aimed to help overturn and prevent wrongful convictions, and the case of DuBoise was reviewed by the unit. In August 2020, the DNA testing of the rape kits used in the Grams case investigation proved that DuBoise was not the real killer, and the DNA profile belonged to two unknown individuals. This led to the exoneration of DuBoise in September 2020, 37 years after he was arrested and charged with the crime. Grams's murder remained unsolved until August 2022, when DNA tests identified both Robinson and Scott as the killers.

=== Carlos Orellana ===
In October 1983, Carlos Orellana was the third victim to be killed by Robinson and Scott, and this crime was the case that led to their arrest. Orellana, a Honduran immigrant, was attacked by the duo in the parking lot of a local bar in Tampa, Florida. Orellana was beaten unconscious before he was placed onto the back seat of his car, and the pair drove the victim to an isolated area in Oldsmar, Florida.

After reaching the area, Orellana was pulled out of the car, but he tried to resist and got into a scuffle with Scott. Robinson, who took the wheel, attempted to run over Orellana, but the fight made him stop because he did not want to accidentally run over his accomplice. Scott overpowered Orellana, beating and choking him before killing him by running him over with the car. After the murder, the vehicle was stuck in the sand while it remained on top of the victim, and it was pulled out by two unknown men driving pickup trucks. The body of Orellana was then moved out of the road and abandoned in a forested area, and Scott and Robinson departed the area in the victim's car.

== First murder trial and appeals ==
Two weeks after the murder of Carlos Orellana, Abron Scott and Amos Robinson were arrested at the home of Robinson's mother in Jackson County, after police investigations identified the pair as the perpetrators of Orellana's abduction-killing. On November 21, 1983, Scott and Robinson were both indicted by a grand jury for first-degree murder.

In April 1984, Robinson was convicted of first-degree murder by the jury. On June 21, 1984, Circuit Court Judge Fred L. Bryson sentenced Robinson to death by electrocution upon the jury's 10–2 majority vote for capital punishment. As of September 1984, Robinson was one of 18 Pinellas County prisoners awaiting execution on Florida's death row.

On December 10, 1984, Scott was sentenced to death by Judge Susan Schaefer after he was found guilty of kidnapping and murdering Orellana. Scott was also given an additional 60 years' imprisonment for the kidnapping charge.

On April 10, 1986, Robinson's appeal against his death sentence was allowed by the Florida Supreme Court, which vacated his death sentence and ordered a re-sentencing hearing, after they ruled that the judge erred in not allowing the jury to hear mitigating evidence in his trial. Ultimately, Robinson was re-sentenced to life imprisonment on an unspecified date.

On September 25, 1986, the Florida Supreme Court upheld Scott's death sentence and denied his appeal. Two years later, in September 1988, Scott's death warrant was signed by then Governor Bob Martinez, and he was scheduled to be executed on November 30, 1988. However, Scott received a stay of execution before the sentence was due to be carried out.

On July 23, 1992, the Florida Supreme Court granted Scott's second appeal and overturned his death sentence, citing the disparity between his sentence and that of his co-defendant. The court also considered Scott's age, low IQ, and comparable culpability for the crime. Scott's sentence was commuted to life imprisonment as a result of the ruling.

== Robinson's post-1983 murder charges ==
=== Herminia Castro ===
Amos Robinson was a suspect behind the September 1983 murder of Herminia Grillo Castro, a 57-year-old seamstress. Castro was last seen alive by her sister-in-law when she drove her sister-in-law to her workplace at the Krispy Kreme outlet on North Florida Avenue, and dropped her off before she departed the area, and Castro never made it home. Her car was later found smoldered in a field near Memorial Park Cemetery, and she was found dead with a shotgun wound on her head. Her gold ring was still intact, but her gold cross necklace and a medal were missing.

In 1991, Robinson and his brother Labron Cordilia Marshal were both charged with the murder of Castro, eight years after it happened. At that time, Robinson was serving his life sentence at the Florida State Prison, while Marshal was serving life in prison at the Baker Correctional Institution for sexual battery, false imprisonment, grand theft, sexual battery on a child and lewd and lascivious behavior. However, the case did not proceed to trial, after a witness gave testimony to provide an alibi for both Robinson and Marshal.

=== Prison killings of Arturi Verra and Sang Thanh Nguyen ===
Throughout his incarceration, Robinson committed two more murders, and the victims in these cases were prisoners he interacted with behind bars. The first was on January 14, 1998, when 22-year-old Arturi Verra (February 6, 1975 – January 14, 1998) was stabbed and stomped to death at the Washington Correctional Institution, and according to other inmates, Robinson engaged in a sexual relationship with Verra and the latter tried to stop their relationship, which led to the murder. Verra was serving a life term for a first-degree murder conviction dated back to 1994 in Monroe County.

The second occurred on November 11, 2004, when Robinson attacked and fatally battered 29-year-old cellmate Sang Thanh Nguyen (December 12, 1974 – November 11, 2004) during a sexual encounter at the Century Correctional Institution. Nguyen was serving a 22-year term for second-degree murder and 25 years for robbery since 2000. Robinson was convicted of murdering Verra and Nguyen in 2000 and 2006 respectively, and received two consecutive terms of life without parole for second-degree murder.

== 2022 murder charges ==
=== Indictment ===
On August 4, 2022, Hillsborough County State Attorney Andrew H. Warren announced in a press conference that the authorities made a breakthrough in the investigations into the murders of Linda Lansen and Barbara Grams. DNA testing identified both Amos Robinson and Abron Scott as the perpetrators behind both homicides, and a grand jury indicted the pair for charges of rape and murder. On the same date of Warren's press conference, he was formally suspended from office by Governor Ron DeSantis for his alleged refusal to undertake restrictions on abortion and gender-affirming therapy for underaged individuals.

On August 17, 2022, both Scott and Robinson pleaded not guilty to the two murders, two weeks after they were indicted for the two cases.

On October 12, 2022, acting Hillsborough County State Attorney Susan Lopez, who replaced Andrew Warren after his suspension, formally announced that the prosecution would seek the death penalty for both Robinson and Scott for the charges of murdering Grams and Lansen.

=== Scott's guilty plea in 2024 ===
On March 24, 2024, one of the men, Abron Scott, pleaded guilty to the first-degree murders of both Grams and Lansen and another two counts of sexual battery, in exchange for the prosecution to take the death penalty off the table. Scott was sentenced to two additional life sentences after he entered his plea, and he also agreed to become the prosecution's key witness against his accomplice Robinson in his upcoming trial for the two cases. These two life terms were to run consecutively with the first he received for the murder of Carlos Orellana.

On the day Scott was sentenced, Lansen's daughter made a victim impact statement in court, expressing her anger that her life was ruined after her mother was killed, and she stated she never expected to come face-to-face with her mother's murderer after more than four decades since it happened. Scott was also granted a chance to address the court, and he publicly apologized to the victims' families and sought forgiveness for his actions.

=== Robinson's case ===
Robinson, who was the second and last defendant to await trial, was reportedly set to stand trial in 2026 for the murders of Lansen and Grams. In January 2026, Assistant State Attorneys Ronald Gale and Chinwe Fossett requested that Robinson should be prosecuted in a single trial for the murders of Grams and Lansen, but Hillsborough Judge Lyann Goudie ruled that the Grams and Lansen murders were too distinct for them to be tried together, and therefore, Robinson is set to undergo two separate trials for the two women's killings. If convicted, Robinson faces the death penalty.

== See also ==
- List of serial killers in the United States
