= 2022 Florida Attorney General election =

2022 Florida attorney general election
- November 8, 2022
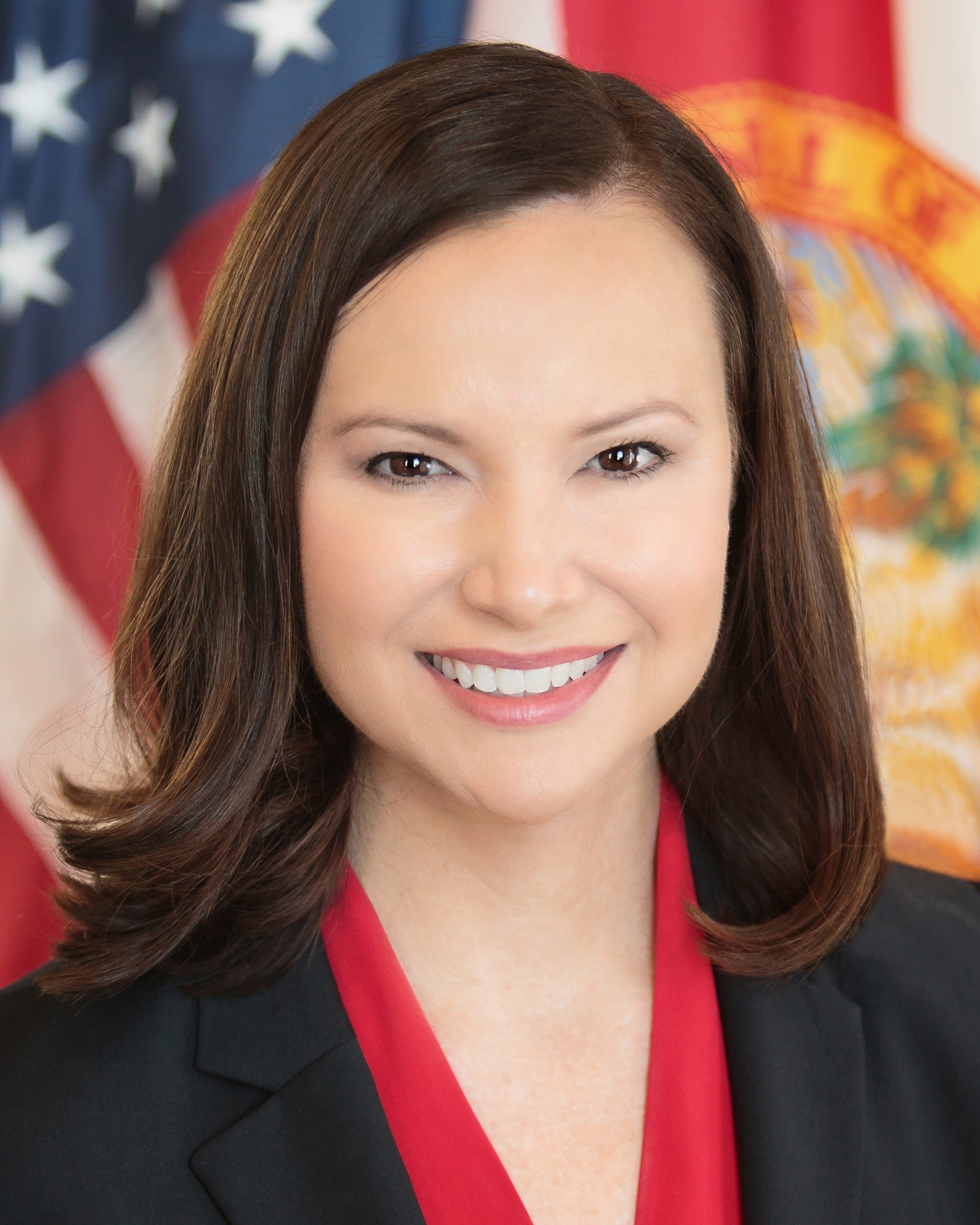

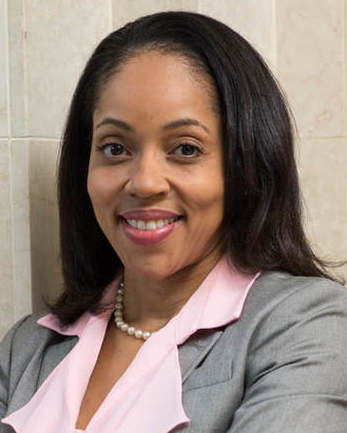
Nominee	Ashley Moody	Aramis Ayala
Party	Republican	Democratic
Popular vote	4,651,376	3,025,959
Percentage	60.59%	39.41%
- Moody: 50–60% 60–70% 70–80% 80–90% >90% Ayala: 50–60% 60–70% 70–80% 80–90% >90% Tie: 50% No votes
Attorney General before election
Ashley Moody
Republican
Elected Attorney General
Ashley Moody
Republican

The 2022 Florida attorney general election took place on November 8, 2022, to elect the Florida attorney general. Incumbent Republican attorney general Ashley Moody was reelected for a second term, defeating Democratic challenger Aramis Ayala by a 21-point margin in a landslide victory. Moody received the most raw votes and the highest percentage of the vote of any statewide candidate in the 2022 Florida elections.

== Republican primary ==
=== Candidates ===
==== Declared ====
- Ashley Moody, incumbent Florida attorney general

=== Endorsements ===
Ashley Moody

U.S. Executive Branch officials

- Donald Trump, 45th president of the United States (2017–2021)

Statewide officials

- Ron DeSantis, governor of Florida

Sheriffs

- Chad Chronister, sheriff of Hillsborough County
- Dennis Lemma, sheriff of Seminole County
- Bobby McCallum, sheriff of Levy County
- James Potter, sheriff of DeSoto County
- 60 sheriffs (post primary)

Organizations

- Associated Builders and Contractors
- Florida Chamber of Commerce

== Democratic primary ==
=== Candidates ===
==== Declared ====
- Aramis Ayala, former state attorney for the Ninth Judicial Circuit Court of Florida (2017–2021)
- Jim Lewis, lawyer
- Daniel Uhlfelder, attorney

==== Declined ====
- Fentrice Driskell, state representative (endorsed Ayala)
- Andrew Warren, former state attorney for the Thirteenth Judicial Circuit Court of Florida

=== Endorsements ===
Aramis Ayala

State legislators

- Christopher Benjamin, state representative
- Randolph Bracy, state senator
- Kamia Brown, state representative
- Kevin Chambliss, state representative
- Tracie Davis, state representative
- Fentrice Driskell, state representative
- Jervonte Edmonds, state representative
- Audrey Gibson, state senator and former minority leader of the Florida Senate
- Dianne Hart, state representative
- Patricia Hawkins-Williams, state representative
- Yvonne Hayes Hinson, state representative
- Shevrin Jones, state senator
- Dotie Joseph, state representative
- Travaris McCurdy, state representative
- Rosalind Osgood, state senator
- Bobby Powell, state senator
- Michele Rayner, state representative
- Felicia Robinson, state representative
- Sean Shaw, former state representative and nominee for attorney general in 2018
- Geraldine Thompson, state representative
- Marie Woodson, state representative

Labor unions

- 1199SEIU United Healthcare Workers East
- Service Employees International Union Florida

Organizations

- Democracy for America
- Equality Florida
- Working Families Party
Daniel Uhlfelder

U.S. representatives

- Al Lawson, U.S. representative from Florida's 5th congressional district

State legislators

- Jason Pizzo, state senator

Newspapers

- Miami Herald
- Orlando Sentinel
- Sun-Sentinel
- Tampa Bay Times

=== Polling ===
Poll source	Date(s) administered	Sample size (Note: Key: A – all adults RV – registered voters LV – likely voters V – unclear)	Margin of error	Aramis Ayala	Jim Lewis	Daniel Uhlfelder	Undecided
St. Pete Polls	August 20–21, 2022	1,617 (LV)	± 2.4%	24%	17%	17%	43%
St. Pete Polls	August 2–3, 2022	1,361 (LV)	± 2.7%	18%	17%	9%	56%

=== Results ===
Results by county: Ayala: 30–40%; 40–50%; 50–60%; Uhlfelder: 30–40%; 40–50%; Lewis: 30–40%; 40–50%; 50–60%; 60–70%

Democratic primary results
Party	Candidate	Votes	%
Democratic	Aramis Ayala	637,856	44.95%
Democratic	Daniel Uhlfelder	399,620	28.16%
Democratic	Jim Lewis	381,575	26.89%
Total votes		1,419,051	100.0%

== General election ==
=== Predictions ===
Source	Ranking	As of
Sabato's Crystal Ball	Safe R	September 14, 2022
Elections Daily	Safe R	November 1, 2022

=== Polling ===
Poll source	Date(s) administered	Sample size	Margin of error	Ashley Moody (R)	Aramis Ayala (D)	Other	Undecided
Siena College	October 30 – November 1, 2022	659 (LV)	± 4.4%	49%	35%	3% (Note: "Not going to vote" with 2%; "Another candidate" with 1%)	13%
University of North Florida	October 17–24, 2022	622 (LV)	± 4.7%	50%	36%	1% (Note: "Refused" with 1%; "Someone else" with <1%)	13%
Mason-Dixon Polling & Strategy	September 26–28, 2022	800 (LV)	± 3.5%	50%	37%	–	13%
Siena College	September 18–25, 2022	669 (LV)	± 4.5%	41%	34%	2% (Note: "Not going to vote" with 2%)	22%

Hypothetical polling

Ashley Moody vs. generic Democrat

Poll source	Date(s) administered	Sample size	Margin of error	Ashley Moody (R)	Generic Democrat	Undecided
Data for Progress (D) (Note: Poll sponsored by the Defend Students Action Fund)	September 15–22, 2020	620 (LV)	± 3.9%	40%	42%	18%

=== Results ===
State Senate district results

State House district results

2022 Florida attorney general election
Party	Candidate	Votes	%	±%
Republican	Ashley Moody (incumbent)	4,651,279	60.59%	+8.48%
Democratic	Aramis Ayala	3,025,943	39.41%	−6.69%
Total votes		7,677,222	100.0%	
Republican hold				

==== By county ====
2022 Florida attorney general election (by county)
County	Ashley Moody Republican		Aramis Ayala Democratic		Margin		Total votes cast
County	#	%	#	%	#	%	Total votes cast
Alachua	40,899	43.07%	54,051	56.93%	-13,152	-13.86%	94,950
Baker	9,523	89.81%	1,081	10.19%	8,442	79.62%	10,604
Bay	52,728	79.03%	13,991	20.97%	38,737	49.96%	66,719
Bradford	8,329	82.31%	1,790	17.69%	6,539	64.62%	10,119
Brevard	175,358	66.34%	88,987	33.66%	86,371	32.68%	264,345
Broward	245,705	41.66%	344,127	58.34%	-98,422	-16.68%	589,832
Calhoun	4,179	86.50%	652	13.50%	3,527	73.00%	4,831
Charlotte	65,053	71.22%	26,285	28.78%	38,768	42.44%	91,338
Citrus	57,574	76.60%	17,584	23.40%	39,990	53.20%	75,158
Clay	68,074	76.11%	21,369	23.89%	46,705	52.22%	89,443
Collier	116,420	72.22%	44,781	27.78%	71,639	44.44%	161,201
Columbia	18,762	79.95%	4,706	20.05%	14,056	59.90%	23,468
DeSoto	6,574	76.62%	2,006	23.38%	4,568	53.24%	8,580
Dixie	5,375	87.80%	747	12.20%	4,628	75.60%	6,122
Duval	186,628	57.19%	139,677	42.81%	46,951	14.38%	326,305
Escambia	75,597	65.83%	39,243	34.17%	36,354	31.66%	114,840
Flagler	39,689	68.30%	18,418	31.70%	21,271	36.60%	58,107
Franklin	4,010	74.52%	1,371	25.48%	2,639	49.04%	5,381
Gadsden	7,202	41.63%	10,099	58.37%	-2,897	-16.74%	17,301
Gilchrist	6,812	87.33%	988	12.67%	5,824	74.66%	7,800
Glades	3,041	80.39%	742	19.61%	2,299	60.78%	3,783
Gulf	5,145	80.59%	1,239	19.41%	3,906	61.18%	6,384
Hamilton	3,170	74.41%	1,090	25.59%	2,080	48.82%	4,260
Hardee	4,591	83.70%	894	16.30%	3,697	67.40%	5,485
Hendry	6,038	74.10%	2,110	25.90%	3,928	48.20%	8,148
Hernando	57,154	71.82%	22,422	28.18%	34,732	43.64%	79,576
Highlands	29,906	75.76%	9,570	24.24%	20,336	51.52%	39,476
Hillsborough	268,026	55.91%	211,378	44.09%	56,648	11.82%	479,404
Holmes	6,209	92.04%	537	7.96%	5,672	84.08%	6,746
Indian River	52,607	68.96%	23,678	31.04%	28,929	37.92%	76,285
Jackson	12,456	76.77%	3,769	23.23%	8,687	53.54%	16,225
Jefferson	4,459	63.03%	2,615	36.97%	1,844	26.06%	7,074
Lafayette	2,618	90.56%	273	9.44%	2,345	81.02%	2,891
Lake	109,246	69.01%	49,055	30.99%	60,191	38.02%	158,301
Lee	187,177	69.17%	83,426	30.83%	103,751	38.34%	270,603
Leon	52,498	45.12%	63,860	54.88%	-11,362	-9.76%	116,358
Levy	14,079	79.03%	3,735	20.97%	10,344	58.06%	17,814
Liberty	2,231	86.01%	363	13.99%	1,868	72.02%	2,594
Madison	4,783	68.80%	2,169	31.20%	2,614	37.60%	6,952
Manatee	113,464	66.67%	56,730	33.33%	56,734	33.34%	170,194
Marion	109,859	71.09%	44,673	28.91%	65,186	42.18%	154,532
Martin	54,012	70.49%	22,614	29.51%	31,398	40.98%	76,626
Miami-Dade	381,306	54.59%	317,204	45.41%	64,102	9.18%	698,510
Monroe	20,428	61.04%	13,037	38.96%	7,391	22.08%	33,465
Nassau	37,044	78.37%	10,225	21.63%	26,819	56.74%	47,269
Okaloosa	61,888	77.14%	18,338	22.86%	48,550	54.28%	80,226
Okeechobee	8,704	81.13%	2,025	18.87%	6,679	62.26%	10,729
Orange	191,792	47.75%	209,882	52.25%	-18,090	-4.50%	401,674
Osceola	54,536	53.58%	47,256	46.42%	7,280	7.16%	101,792
Palm Beach	278,339	51.76%	259,365	48.24%	18,974	3.52%	537,704
Pasco	151,504	67.97%	71,391	32.03%	80,113	35.94%	222,895
Pinellas	237,207	56.70%	181,179	43.30%	56,028	13.40%	418,386
Polk	150,607	66.28%	76,618	33.72%	73,989	32.56%	227,225
Putnam	20,389	77.37%	5,964	22.63%	14,425	54.74%	26,353
St. Johns	101,281	70.88%	41,611	29.12%	59,670	41.76%	142,892
St. Lucie	72,532	60.05%	48,257	39.95%	24,275	20.10%	120,789
Santa Rosa	60,230	80.20%	14,867	19.80%	45,363	60.40%	75,097
Sarasota	135,762	62.67%	80,853	37.33%	54,909	25.34%	216,615
Seminole	104,330	57.79%	76,192	42.21%	28,138	15.58%	180,522
Sumter	66,690	75.35%	21,814	24.65%	44,876	50.70%	88,504
Suwannee	13,677	84.04%	2,598	15.96%	11,079	68.08%	16,275
Taylor	6,353	83.69%	1,238	16.31%	5,115	67.38%	7,591
Union	3,987	88.31%	528	11.69%	3,459	76.62%	4,515
Volusia	147,726	66.13%	75,668	33.87%	72,058	32.26%	223,394
Wakulla	11,236	75.35%	3,676	24.65%	7,560	50.70%	14,912
Walton	28,663	82.71%	5,992	17.29%	22,671	65.42%	34,655
Washington	7,808	86.01%	1,270	13.99%	6,538	72.02%	9,078
Totals	4,651,279	60.59%	3,025,943	39.41%	1,625,336	21.18%	7,677,222

Counties that flipped from Democratic to Republican

- Miami-Dade (largest city: Miami)
- Osceola (largest municipality: Kissimmee)
- Palm Beach (largest city: West Palm Beach)

==== By congressional district ====
Moody won 22 of 28 congressional districts, including two that elected Democrats.

District	Moody	Ayala	Representative
1st	74%	26%	Matt Gaetz
2nd	64%	36%	Neal Dunn
3rd	65%	35%	Kat Cammack
4th	62%	38%	Aaron Bean
5th	67%	33%	John Rutherford
6th	70%	30%	Michael Waltz
7th	62%	38%	Stephanie Murphy (117th Congress)
7th	62%	38%	Cory Mills (118th Congress)
8th	65%	35%	Bill Posey
9th	51%	49%	Darren Soto
10th	43%	57%	Val Demings (117th Congress)
10th	43%	57%	Maxwell Frost (118th Congress)
11th	65%	35%	Daniel Webster
12th	72%	28%	Gus Bilirakis
13th	60%	40%	Anna Paulina Luna
14th	49%	51%	Kathy Castor
15th	61%	39%	Laurel Lee
16th	63%	37%	Vern Buchanan
17th	66%	34%	Greg Steube
18th	71%	29%	Scott Franklin
19th	70%	30%	Byron Donalds
20th	30%	70%	Sheila Cherfilus-McCormick
21st	63%	37%	Brian Mast
22nd	49%	51%	Lois Frankel
23rd	50.2%	49.8%	Jared Moskowitz
24th	31%	69%	Frederica Wilson
25th	47%	53%	Debbie Wasserman Schultz
26th	69%	31%	Mario Díaz-Balart
27th	57%	43%	María Elvira Salazar
28th	63%	37%	Carlos A. Giménez

== Notes ==
Partisan clients

== See also ==
- 2022 United States attorney general elections
- Florida Attorney General
