= Harry Coe =

Harry Coe may refer to:

- Harry Coe (athlete) (1885—1977), American track and field athlete
- Harry Coe (attorney) (1932—2000), American circuit judge and state attorney

== See also ==
- Harrison Coe (born 1999), Australian rules footballer with the Collingwood Football Club
- Henry Coe (disambiguation)
