= Carl Littlefield (politician) =

American politician (born 1948)

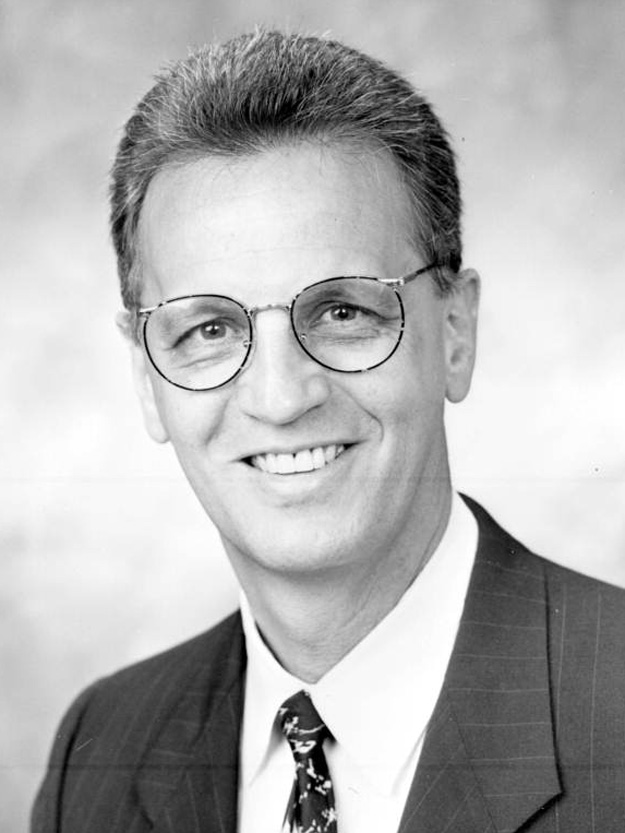

Member of the Florida House of Representatives from the 61st district
- In office November 3, 1992 – January 8, 1999
- Preceded by: Buddy Johnson (redistricting)
- Succeeded by: Ken Littlefield

Personal details
- Born: July 25, 1948 (age 78) Pascagoula, Mississippi
- Party: Republican
- Children: 1
- Education: Southeastern College
- Occupation: Real estate appraiser

Carl Littlefield (born July 25, 1948) is a Republican politician from Florida who served as a member of the Florida House of Representatives from the 61st district from 1992 to 1999 and as a cabinet official in several departments.

== Early life ==
Littlefield was born in Pascagoula, Mississippi, in 1948, and grew up in Michigan. He moved to Florida in 1968 to attend Southeastern College, and worked in New York City as a property manager and accounting assistant. Littlefield settled in Dade City, Florida, in the early 1980s, where he helped manage his family's furniture store and served as president of the city chamber of commerce.

In 1990, Littlefield ran for the Dade City Commission from Seat 2, and was elected with 55 percent of the vote.

== Florida House of Representatives ==
Following the redistricting of the state's legislative districts in 1992, Littlefield ran for the Florida House of Representatives from the newly created 61st district, which included northern Hillsborough and eastern Pasco counties. He won the Republican nomination unopposed, and faced Democrat Dan Dwyer, an attorney, in the general election. Littlefield narrowly defeated Dwyer, winning 52 percent of the vote to Dwyer's 48 percent.

In 1994, Littlefield ran for re-election, citing his advocacy for seniors during his first term, and he was challenged by Democrat Candy VanDercar. He defeated VanDercar in a landslide, winning 63 percent of the vote to her 37 percent.

Littlefield was re-elected without opposition in 1996 and 1998.

== Cabinet service ==
Littlefield resigned from the State House in 1999 to serve as deputy secretary of the Florida Department of Elder Affairs under Governor Jeb Bush. His brother, Ken Littlefield, was subsequently elected to replace him. Shortly after assuming the position, he was tasked by Bush to serve as the developmental disabilities coordinator at the Department of Children and Families.

In 2011, Governor Rick Scott named Littlefield as the director of the Agency for Persons with Disabilities. However, Littlefield withdrew several weeks later after State Senator Ronda Storms began investigating allegations of sexually abuse at a group home that he had overseen.
