= Monique Worrell =

American prosecutor and politician

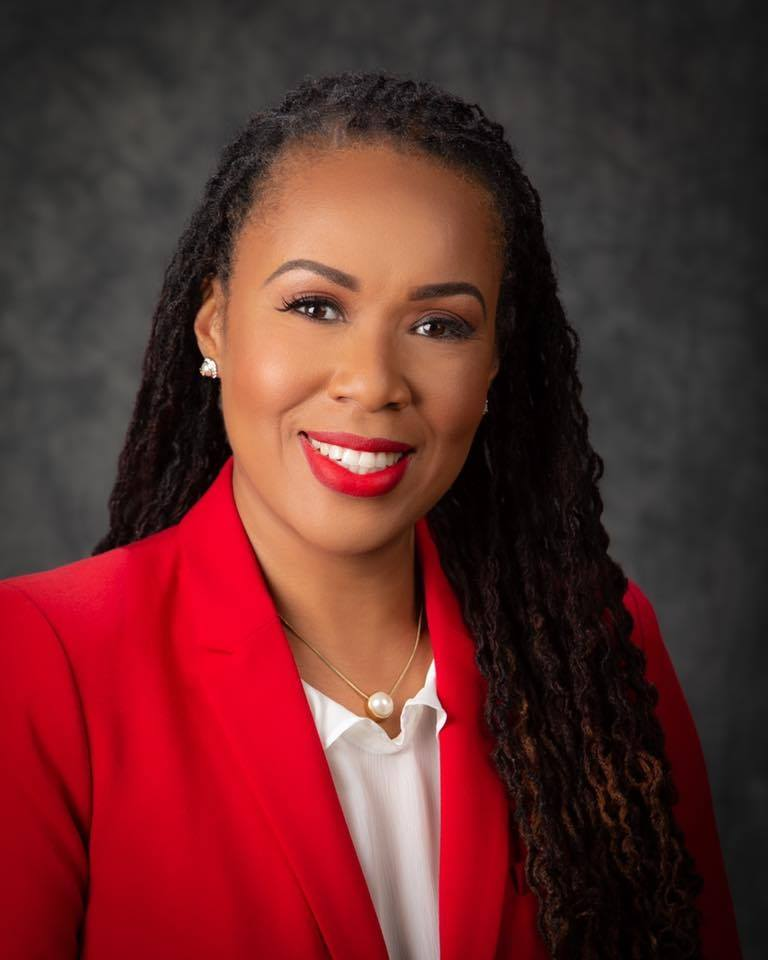
- Official portrait, 2021

State attorney for the Ninth Judicial Circuit Court of Florida
- Incumbent
- Assumed office January 1, 2021; Suspended: August 9, 2023 – January 7, 2025 (Note: Andrew Bain served as acting State Attorney for the duration of Worrell's suspension.)
- Preceded by: Aramis Ayala

Personal details
- Born: New York City, New York, U.S.
- Party: Democratic
- Education: University of Florida

Monique Haughton Worrell is a prosecutor and Democratic politician who has served as the state attorney for the Ninth Judicial Circuit Court of Florida since January 2021. On August 9, 2023 Florida Governor Ron DeSantis suspended Worrell from her office and appointed circuit judge Andrew Bain as acting state attorney for the remaining duration of her term. Worrell ran for a second-term against Bain. In 2024, Worrell was re-elected to a second term.

== Life ==
Worrell earned a J.D. from the University of Florida Levin College of Law.

Worrell worked as an assistant public defender and private criminal defense lawyer. She taught at her alma mater for 16 years and served as the founding director of its criminal justice center. Worrell was hired in 2018 by state attorney Aramis Ayala as the director of the conviction integrity unit. In 2019, she became the chief legal officer of Reform Alliance. In October 2020, she returned to the conviction integrity unit.

In April 2020, Worrell, a Democrat, announced her bid to succeed her supervisor, Ayala. Her campaign was endorsed by vice president Kamala Harris, senator Bernie Sanders, and musician John Legend. She campaigned as a progressive and criminal justice reformer. In November 2020, she was elected with almost 66 percent of the vote against non-affiliated Jose Torroella.

She took office in January 2021. Worrell became the second African-American elected as state attorney in Florida and the first of Caribbean descent. She has had contentious interactions with Republican state officials. In March 2023, Worrell announced her reelection bid. On August 9, 2023, Florida governor Ron DeSantis suspended her and appointed an acting state attorney to operate the office. He accused Worrell of "neglect of duty and incompetence." In September, she filed a lawsuit against DeSantis in which she asked the Florida Supreme Court to reverse his order. This lawsuit causes a delay in the consideration of her suspension in compliance with Senate Rule 12.9 which states, in relevant part, the Senate process shall be held in abeyance and the matter shall not be considered by the Senate until final determination of a court challenge and the exhaustion of all appellate remedies. She stated she would seek reelection in 2024. On June 6, 2024, the Florida Supreme Court denied Worrell’s petition for a writ of quo warranto and dismissed her petition for writ of mandamus, upholding her suspension by Governor Ron DeSantis.

A detailed review into the allegations against her by the Orlando Sentinel found that Osceola County sheriff's deputies errors had undermined the prosecution. Osceola County Sheriff Marcos López claimed Worrell hadn’t prosecuted a single one of the 74 drug trafficking arrests his office made in 2022. The investigation found that several of those cases resulted in convictions and that nearly half were still in process. It concluded that Worrell successfully prosecuted some drug trafficking cases while judges and state crime labs dismissed the others.

On November 5, 2024 she was elected as State Attorney for the Ninth Judicial Circuit a second time after securing 57.5% of the vote.

On May 13, 2021, Ahmad Jihad Bojeh was charged in Osceola County with attempted first-degree murder following a shooting, but the case concluded when a judge accepted a not guilty by reason of insanity defense. This resulted in his release after court-ordered mental health treatment. The prosecution was handled by the Ninth Judicial Circuit State Attorney’s Office under Monique Worrell, a fact later emphasized by critics. On January 19, 2026, Bojeh was arrested and charged in a random attack that killed three tourists in Osceola County. The killings sparked sharp backlash from state officials and victims’ advocates, who argued prosecutors failed to vigorously challenge the insanity defense despite Bojeh’s violent history. Critics cited the case as emblematic of what they described as Worrell’s lenient approach to violent offenders. Worrell rejected personal responsibility, stating the decision was made by a judge and blaming broader failures in the criminal justice system, particularly its handling of defendants with severe mental illness.

== Electoral history ==
Year	Election	Position	Result
2020	Democratic Primary	State Attorney (Orange-Osceola)	Won (August 18, 2020)
2020	General Election	State Attorney (Orange-Osceola)	Elected (November 3, 2020)
2024	General Election	State Attorney (Orange-Osceola)	Elected (November 5, 2024)

== See also ==
- Andrew H. Warren, state attorney suspended by DeSantis
