= 2022 Florida elections =

- Turnout: 53.6% ▼9.0
- Turnout: 40-50% 50-60% 60-70% 70-80%

A general election was held on Tuesday, November 8, 2022, to elect candidates throughout Florida, as part of the 2022 midterm elections. The results of the elections showed strong Republican Party outcomes, with every statewide Republican candidate won in a landslide, all winning by double digits. Every statewide candidate also carried Miami-Dade County, the most populous county in the state.

The Florida Republican Party also expanded its majority in the state legislature and won 20 out of Florida's 28 U.S. House seats. As a result, Republicans now control every statewide office in the state for the first time since Reconstruction. Political analysts believe the results may be an indication that the state has transitioned from being a swing state into a reliably Republican red state.

== United States House of Representatives ==
All of Florida's 28 house seats were up in the 2022 elections. Republicans, who had already held a majority with 16 seats, expanded their majority by four seats by defeating the incumbent Democrats in Florida's 4th, 7th, 13th, and 15th congressional districts; due to this, Florida Democrats were downgraded from 11 to eight seats.

== United States Senate ==
2022 United States Senate election in Florida results map by county Map legend: Rubio—50-60%; Rubio—60-70%; Rubio—70-80%; Rubio—80-90%; Rubio—>90%; Demings—40-50%; Demings—50-60%; Demings—60-70%

Incumbent Republican senator Marco Rubio won a third term to the senate, defeating the Democratic nominee Val Demings.

Despite her loss, Demings performed the best out of any Democrat running in a statewide race in Florida in the 2022 election cycle.

United States Senate election in Florida, 2022
Party	Candidate	Votes	%
Republican	Marco Rubio (incumbent)	4,474,847	57.7
Democratic	Val Demings	3,201,522	41.3
Total votes		7,676,369	100.0
Republican hold			

== Governor of Florida ==
2022 Florida gubernatorial election results map by county Map legend: DeSantis—50-60%; DeSantis—60-70%; DeSantis—70-80%; DeSantis—80-90%; DeSantis—>90%; Crist—50-60%; Crist—60-70%

Incumbent Republican governor Ron DeSantis was challenged for reelection by Democrat Charlie Crist, who previously served as governor from 2007 to 2011 as a Republican but switched parties in 2012. DeSantis won the election in a landslide victory by gaining 1,507,897 more votes over Crist.

Florida gubernatorial election, 2022
Party	Candidate	Votes	%
Republican	Ron DeSantis (incumbent)	4,614,210	59.4
Democratic	Charlie Crist	3,106,313	40.0
Total votes		7,720,523	100.0
Republican hold			

== Attorney general ==
2022 Florida attorney general election results map by county Map legend: Moody—50-60%; Moody—60-70%; Moody—70-80%; Moody—80-90%; Moody—>90%; Ayala—50-60%

Incumbent Republican attorney general Ashley Moody ran for reelection, being challenged by Democrat Aramis Ayala, a former state attorney. Moody defeated Ayala in the general election by a 21-point margin.

Florida attorney general election, 2022
Party	Candidate	Votes	%
Republican	Ashley Moody (incumbent)	4,651,376	60.6
Democratic	Aramis Ayala	3,025,959	39.4
Total votes		7,677,335	100.0
Republican hold			

== Chief Financial Officer ==
2022 Florida Chief Financial Officer election results by county Map legend: Patronis—50-60%; Patronis—60-70%; Patronis—70-80%; Patronis—80-90%; Patronis—>90%; Hattersley—50-60%; Hattersley—60-70%

Incumbent Republican officer Jimmy Patronis was challenged for reelection by Democrat Adam Hattersley. Patronis defeated Hattersley in the general election.

Florida chief financial officer election, 2022
Party	Candidate	Votes	%
Republican	Jimmy Patronis (incumbent)	4,528,909	59.5
Democratic	Adam Hattersley	3,085,711	40.5
Total votes		7,614,620	100.0
Republican hold			

== Commissioner of Agriculture ==
2022 Florida Commissioner of Agriculture election results map by county Map legend: Simpson—50-60%; Simpson—60-70%; Simpson—70-80%; Simpson—80-90%; Simpson—>90%; Blemur—50-60%; Blemur—60-70%

Incumbent Democratic commissioner Nikki Fried decided not to run for reelection and instead ran for governor but failed to win the nomination. The Democratic Party nominated Naomi Blemur to run in the 2022 election for commissioner, but Blemur was defeated in the general election Republican Wilton Simpson.

Florida commissioner of agriculture election, 2022
Party	Candidate	Votes	%
Republican	Wilton Simpson	4,510,644	59.3
Democratic	Naomi Blemur	3,095,786	40.7
Total votes		7,606,430	100.0
Republican gain from Democratic			

== Florida House of Representatives ==
All 120 seats in the Florida House of Representatives were up for election in 2022. Republicans expanded their majority from 78 to 85 seats, giving them a supermajority in the House.

== Florida Senate ==
All 40 seats in the Florida Senate were up for election in 2022. Republicans expanded their majority from 24 to 28 seats, giving them a supermajority in the Senate.

== Florida Supreme Court ==
Incumbent Supreme Court Justices Charles T. Canady, John D. Couriel, Jamie Grosshans, Jorge Labarga, and Ricky Polston were all up for a retention vote in 2022. All of the justices were retained, allowing each to serve for six more years (Justice Labarga will reach the mandatory retirement age of 75 in 2027).

Shall Justice Charles T. Canady be retained in Office?
Choice	Votes	%
For	4,358,437	63.96
Against	2,455,875	36.04
Total	6,814,312	100.00

2022 Canady retention vote by county Map legend: Yes—70-80%; Yes—60-70%; Yes—50-60%

Shall Justice John D. Couriel be retained in Office?
Choice	Votes	%
For	4,305,014	63.66
Against	2,457,705	36.34
Total	6,762,719	100.00

2022 Couriel retention vote by county Map legend: Yes—70-80%; Yes—60-70%; Yes—50-60%; No—50-60%

Shall Justice Jamie Grosshans be retained in Office?
Choice	Votes	%
For	4,306,135	63.83
Against	2,439,942	36.17
Total	6,746,077	100.00

2022 Grosshans retention vote by county Map legend: Yes—70-80%; Yes—60-70%; Yes—50-60%; No—50-60%

Shall Justice Jorge Labarga be retained in Office?
Choice	Votes	%
For	4,197,872	62.35
Against	2,535,034	37.65
Total	6,732,906	100.00

2022 Labarga retention vote by county Map legend: Yes—60-70%; Yes—50-60%; No—50-60%

Shall Justice Ricky Polston be retained in Office?
Choice	Votes	%
For	4,240,078	63.03
Against	2,486,947	36.97
Total	6,727,025	100.00

2022 Polston retention vote by county Map legend: Yes—70-80%; Yes—60-70%; Yes—50-60%

== Ballot measures ==
To pass, any state constitutional amendment requires 60% of the vote.

=== Amendment 1 ===
Limits on taxes to flood-improved properties would enable the state legislature "to prohibit, for the purposes of determining a property's tax, 'any change or improvement' to that property's resistance to flooding."

Amendment 1
Choice	Votes	%
For	4,016,022	57.26
Against	2,997,158	42.74
Required majority		60.00
Total	7,013,180	100.00

=== Amendment 2 ===
Abolish the Constitutional Revision Commission aimed to abolish the Constitution Revision Commission, or CRC.

Amendment 2
Choice	Votes	%
For	3,744,930	53.87
Against	3,206,762	46.13
Required majority		60.00
Total	6,951,692	100.00

=== Amendment 3 ===
Additional homestead property tax exemption for certain workers aimed to provide some workers with an additional homestead property tax exemption.

Amendment 3
Choice	Votes	%
For	4,215,601	58.68
Against	2,968,734	41.32
Required majority		60.00
Total	7,184,335	100.00
