= Jacqueline Coffie-Leeks =

American politician

Member-elect of the Florida House of Representatives from the 63rd district
- Assuming office November 3, 2026
- Succeeding: Dianne Hart

Personal details
- Party: Democratic

Jacqueline Coffie-Leeks is an American politician. A member of the Democratic Party, she is the member-elect for the 63rd district of the Florida House of Representatives.
