= Linda Chaney =

American politician

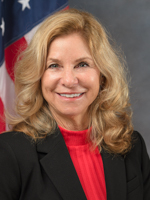

Member of the Florida House of Representatives
- Incumbent
- Assumed office November 3, 2020
- Preceded by: Jennifer Webb
- Constituency: 61st district (2022–present); 69th district (2020–2022)

Personal details
- Born: New York, U.S.
- Party: Republican
- Spouse: William "Bill" Yovic
- Education: University of South Florida (BS)

Linda Chaney is an American politician serving as a member of the Florida House of Representatives from the 61st district. She assumed office on November 3, 2020.

== Early life and education ==
Chaney was born in New York and moved to Florida in 1982. She earned a Bachelor of Science degree in mass communication from the University of South Florida.

== Career ==
Prior to entering politics, Chaney worked in marketing and business development. She co-founded an independent mammography business that was eventually acquired by AdventHealth. She served as a member of the St. Pete Beach City Commission from 2007 to 2009. Chaney was elected to the Florida House of Representatives in November 2020.

== Committee assignments ==
- Rules Committee Vice Chair
- Infrastructure & Tourism Appropriations Subcommittee Vice Chair
- Appropriations Committee
- Infrastructure Strategies Committee
- Agriculture, Conservation & Resiliency Subcommittee
- Healthcare Regulation Subcommittee
