= Will Weatherford =

American politician (born 1979)

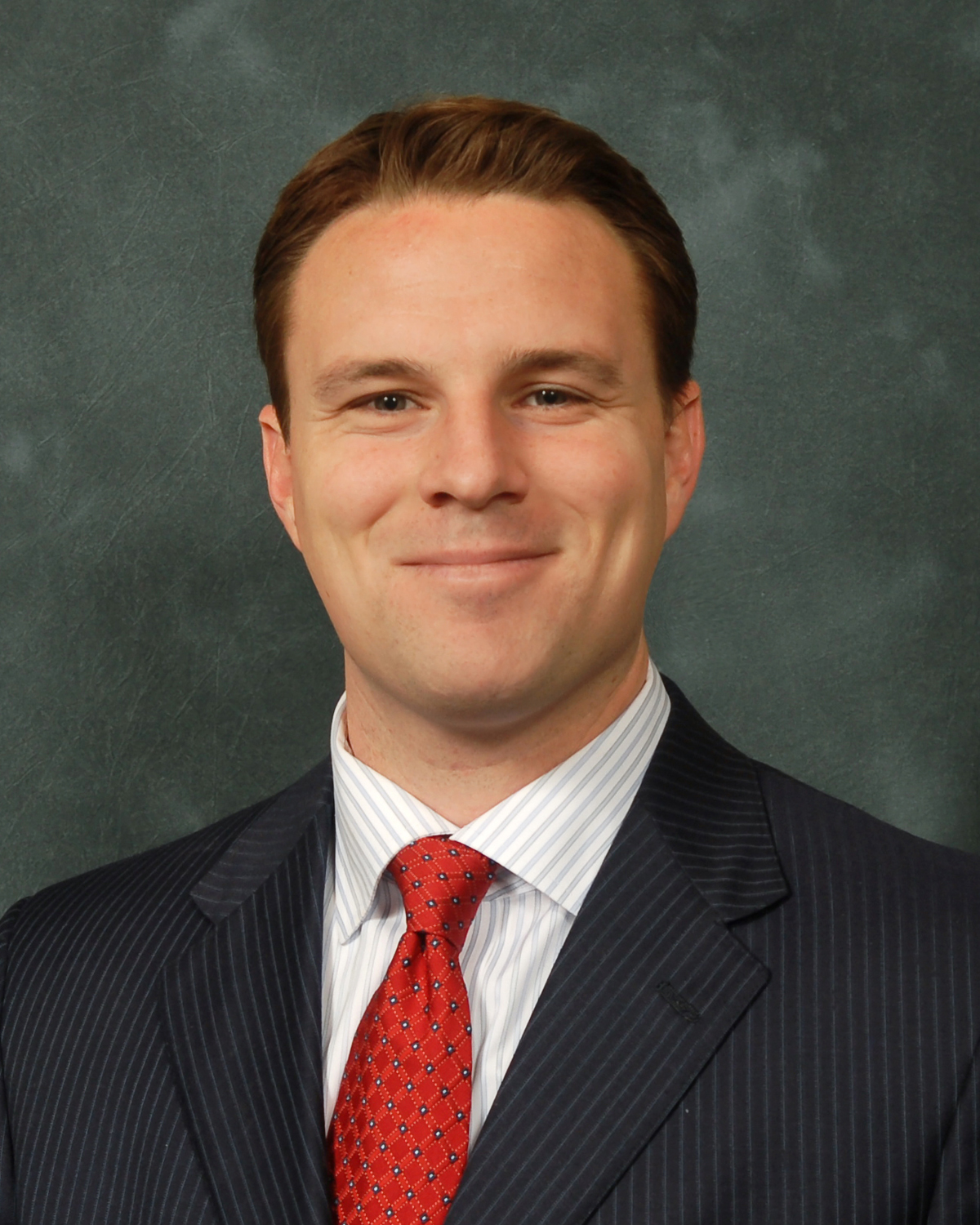
- Official portrait, 2011

98th Speaker of the Florida House of Representatives
- In office November 20, 2012 – November 18, 2014
- Preceded by: Dean Cannon
- Succeeded by: Steve Crisafulli

Member of the Florida House of Representatives
- In office November 7, 2006 – November 4, 2014
- Preceded by: Ken Littlefield
- Succeeded by: Danny Burgess
- Constituency: 61st district (2006–2012); 38th district (2012–2014)

Personal details
- Born: November 14, 1979 (age 46) Dallas, Texas, U.S.
- Party: Republican
- Spouse: Courtney Weatherford
- Children: Ella Kate; Molly Marie; Madelyn Starr; William Winston
- Education: Jacksonville University

William Warner Weatherford (born November 14, 1979) is an American politician who was a Republican member of the Florida House of Representatives from 2006 to 2014, representing the 61st District from 2006 to 2012 and the 38th District, which included eastern Pasco County, from 2012 to 2014. During his final term in the legislature, he served as the Speaker of the Florida House of Representatives, which made him the youngest presiding officer of any state legislative chamber in the United States at the time.

== History ==
William Warner Weatherford was born in Dallas, Texas, and moved to the state of Florida in 1986. He was homeschooled by his parents, but played football at Land O' Lakes High School with his brothers. One of his brothers, Drew Weatherford, would later attend Florida State University and play varsity football for the Florida State Seminoles.

Will Weatherford attended Jacksonville University, where he received a degree in business in 2002. After graduation, Weatherford worked in commercial real estate but was recruited by Allan Bense, his father-in-law and the Speaker of the Florida House of Representatives, to join state government.

== Florida House of Representatives ==
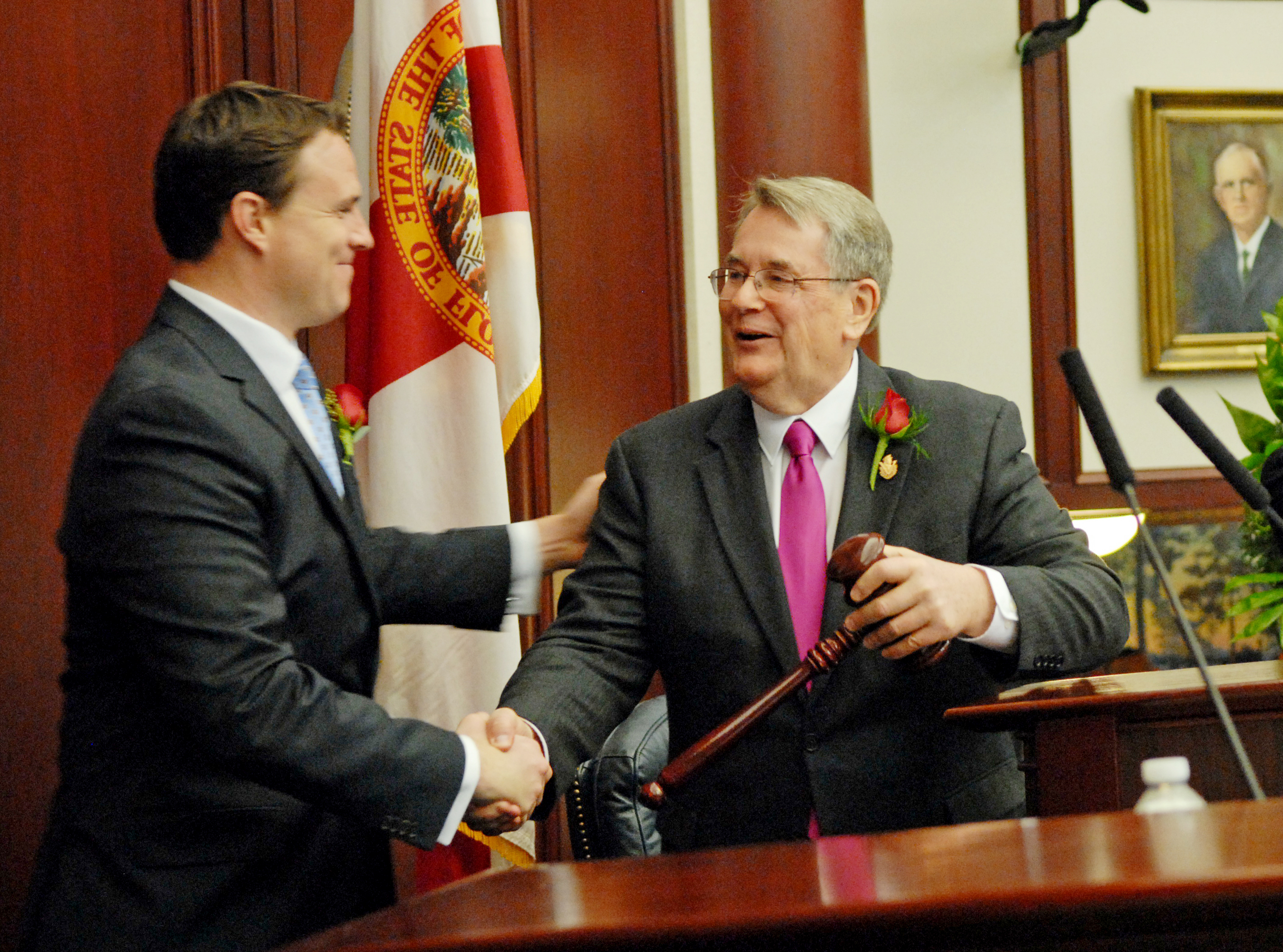
Weatherford and Senate President Don Gaetz

In 2006, incumbent State Representative Ken Littlefield initially planned to seek re-election, and won the Republican primary for the 61st District, which included most of Pasco County and some of northern Hillsborough County. However, Littlefield dropped his re-election plans and resigned from the legislature when he was nominated to the Florida Public Service Commission by Governor Jeb Bush. Weatherford was selected to run in Littlefield's place and faced Donovan Brown, the Democratic nominee. Weatherford's nomination apparently caused Brown, who had a history of mental illness, to suffer a breakdown, and he was admitted to the Harbor Behavioral Health Care Institute in accordance with the Baker Act. Over the course of the campaign, Weatherford massively outspent Brown and attacked him for his opposition to "jail time for people caught possessing small amounts of marijuana," about which he said that, because his name was not on the ballot, "he had to go negative or his district ran the risk of electing someone being treated for a mental disorder." Weatherford ultimately defeated Brown in a landslide, winning over 60% of the vote. He was unopposed for re-election in 2008. In 2010, Weatherford was challenged in the Republican primary by Kevin Wright, but he easily won the renomination of his party, winning more than 80% of the vote. In the general election, he faced the Democratic nominee, Elena McCullough, a veteran, who campaigned as the "true fiscal conservative" in the race. Weatherford had no difficulty turning away her challenge, winning re-election with 65% of the vote to McCullough's 35%.

In 2012, the legislative districts were redrawn and Weatherford ended up in the 38th District, which included most of the territory that he had previously represented in the 61st District, but was only based in Pasco County. He faced no opposition in the primary or general elections and won his final term in the legislature entirely uncontested. As the Chairman of the House Redistricting committee, Weatherford presided over the decennial process that resulted in the Florida Supreme Court ruling 7–0 in favor of the House maps as well as the national record for most incumbents drawn together in state districts.

Weatherford was formally designated as the leader of Republicans in the Florida House of Representatives for the 2012-2014 legislative session in March 2011 following a vote in which he received the support of every single one of his colleagues. On November 20, 2012, Weatherford was sworn in as Speaker of the Florida House of Representatives, by virtue of the fact that his party was in the majority in the House.

In 2013, Weatherford led the charge against the expansion of Medicaid provided for under the Patient Protection and Affordable Care Act, referring to it as "one of the worst forms of insurance you can get in America." Instead, the Florida House of Representatives offered an alternative that would have provided more than 500,000 Floridians with private health insurance without taking any Federal dollars. The 2013 Legislative session ended with approval of priorities of both Weatherford and Senate President Don Gaetz, outlined in the historic "Work Plan Florida." These priorities included campaign finance, ethics, elections and education reform as well as partial pension reform.

In 2014, the presiding officers announced another joint legislative agenda, this time including priority legislation such as education reform, a veterans bill, measures to protect vulnerable Floridians, a tax cut and changes to improve state government. Weatherford supported a proposal that would "put a constitutional amendment on the 2014 ballot that would let voters decide if they should weigh in on the expansion of gambling," noting, "I have become over the years very concerned with the drip, drip, drip expansion of gaming that's taken place in the state of Florida. I am certainly warming up to the idea of having a constitutional amendment that would require all future expansion to go before the voters."

Weatherford made overhauling the retirement plan for public employees in Florida a major legislative priority in 2013 and 2014, and was unsuccessful each time. Despite the fact that the Florida Retirement System is one of the most well-funded public pension plans in the U.S., Weatherford justified his pursuit by comparing the state pension plan to Detroit.

== Weatherford Capital ==
Upon leaving office due to term limits for state representatives, Weatherford founded private equity firm Weatherford Capital with his brothers Sam and Drew.

Florida House of Representatives
Preceded by Ken Littlefield	Member of the Florida House of Representatives from the 61st district November 7, 2006–November 6, 2012	Succeeded by Betty Reed
Preceded by Bryan Nelson	Member of the Florida House of Representatives from the 38th district November 6, 2012–November 4, 2014	Succeeded by Danny Burgess
Political offices
Preceded by Dean Cannon	Speaker of the Florida House of Representatives; November 20, 2012–November 18, 2014	Succeeded by Steve Crisafulli
