= Sean Shaw =

American politician and lawyer

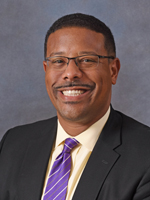
- Shaw in 2015

Member of the Florida House of Representatives from the 61st district
- In office November 8, 2016 – November 6, 2018
- Preceded by: Ed Narain
- Succeeded by: Dianne Hart

Personal details
- Born: March 17, 1978 (age 48) Jacksonville, Florida, U.S.
- Party: Democratic
- Relatives: Leander J. Shaw Jr. (father)
- Education: Princeton University (BA); University of Florida (JD)

Sean Michael Shaw (born March 17, 1978) is an American attorney and politician from the State of Florida. A member of the Democratic Party, he represented Florida House of Representatives District 61, which includes portions of Hillsborough County in and around Tampa, including Ybor City and Tampa Heights, from 2016 to 2018. Shaw was the Democratic nominee for the 2018 Florida Attorney General election.

== Early life and education ==
Shaw was born in Jacksonville, Florida on March 17, 1978. His father was Leander J Shaw Jr., who would later serve on the Supreme Court of Florida, becoming Florida's first African-American chief justice. As a result of his father's position, Shaw grew up in Tallahassee, Florida. Shaw attended Princeton University and graduated with an A.B. in politics in 2000 after completing a 76-page long senior thesis, titled "How Can the Republican Party Turn Black Conservatism into Black Votes?", under the supervision of Tali Mendelberg. He later attended the University of Florida, receiving his Juris Doctor in 2003.

== Career ==
From 2003 until 2008, Shaw began working in various law firms across Florida, including Akerman Senterfitt Law Firm and Caparello and Self. In 2008, Shaw was appointed Florida's Insurance Consumer Advocate by then-Governor Charlie Crist. Shaw served as Insurance Consumer Advocate until 2010, when he took a position at Merlin Law Group.

In 2014, incumbent state representative Betty Reed was unable to seek re-election due to term limits. Shaw decided to run for her district, District 61, facing teacher Sharon Carter, Democratic Party secretary Tatiana Denson and lawyer Edwin Narain in the Democratic primary. The primary became a contest between Narain and the well funded Shaw. Despite Shaw earning the endorsement of former governor Crist, former congressman Jim Davis, former chief financial officer of Florida Alex Sink, and a number of state legislators, Narain won the primary with 42% of the vote. Shaw placed second, receiving 34.5% of the vote. Narain was unopposed in the general election.

In 2016, Narain did not run for re-election, opting instead to run for Florida Senate. Shaw once again ran for District 61. In the Democratic primary, Shaw faced activist Dianne Hart and radio host Walter L. Smith. Shaw narrowly defeated Hart, receiving 43% to Hart's 41%, with Smith a distant third with 15%. Shaw was unopposed in the general election.

In 2019, Shaw accepted a position with Vanguard Attorneys where he works alongside former State Senator Arthenia Joyner.

Currently, Shaw is an attorney with the Swope, Rodante, Newsome & Steinberg law firm located in Ybor City, FL.

=== Florida Attorney General candidacy ===
In 2018, incumbent Republican Florida attorney general Pam Bondi was unable to run for re-election due to term limits. Shaw decided to run to succeed her. In the Democratic primary, he faced attorney Ryan Torrens. However, Shaw attempted to sue Torrens off the ballot, claiming he had improperly transferred money into his campaign account in order to qualify for the primary. Circuit judge Karen Gievers of Tallahassee ruled in Shaw's favor, and ordered Torrens to be removed from the ballot just a week before the primary election. Though an appellate court suspended Gievers ruling pending a review, meaning Torrens would still be on the ballot for election day, Shaw defeated Torrens, receiving 73% to Torrens' 27%.

In the general election, Shaw faced former judge Ashley Moody. Due to Bondi's reputation as a contentious figure in the state, the race became heavily watched. Shaw criticized Moody for being an ally to Bondi, and he ran on a progressive platform of gun safety reforms, removing public corruption, defending civil and equal rights, and serving as a check on the Republican Legislature. Shaw also said that, if elected, he would withdraw Florida from a lawsuit that challenged the constitutionality of the Affordable Care Act. Despite his efforts, Moody defeated Shaw, 52% to 46%.

Florida House of Representatives
Preceded by Edwin Narain	Member of the Florida House of Representatives from the 61st district 2016–2018	Succeeded by Dianne Hart
Party political offices
Preceded by George Sheldon	Democratic nominee for Attorney General of Florida; 2018	Succeeded by Aramis Ayala
