= Ken Littlefield =

American politician

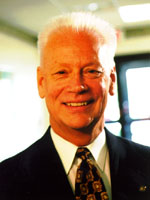

Member of the Florida Public Service Commission
- In office January 9, 2007 – January 31, 2007
- Preceded by: Terry Deason
- Succeeded by: Nancy Argenziano

Member of the Florida House of Representatives from the 61st district
- In office March 9, 1999 – November 7, 2006
- Preceded by: Carl Littlefield
- Succeeded by: Will Weatherford

Personal details
- Born: May 7, 1944 (age 82) Pascagoula, Mississippi, U.S.
- Party: Republican
- Spouse: Carole A. Clark
- Children: LeAnne Webb, Lori Jane Harris
- Education: Central Bible College (B.A.)

Ken Littlefield (born May 7, 1944) is a Republican politician who served as a member of the Florida House of Representatives from the 61st District from 1999 to 2006 and briefly served on the Florida Public Service Commission in 2007.

== Early life and career ==
Littlefield was born in Pascagoula, Mississippi, and attended Central Bible College in Springfield, Missouri, graduating with his bachelor's degree in 1967 and moving to Florida in 1982. He was a minister with Assemblies of God for fifteen years, and left the ministry in 1982 to join the family business, Littlefield's Furniture in Dade City.

== Florida House of Representatives ==
After Jeb Bush won the 1998 gubernatorial election, he appointed Republican State Representative Carl Littlefield, Ken Littlefield's brother, to serve as Deputy Secretary of the Florida Department of Elder Affairs. Bush subsequently scheduled a special election fill the vacancy, and Littlefield ran to succeed his brother in the 61st district, which included Dade City and Zephyrhills in Pasco County and parts of eastern Hillsborough County. He faced water activist Gilliam Clarke in the Republican primary, and defeated her in a landslide, winning 71 percent of the vote to her 29 percent. In the general election, he faced Democratic nominee Larry McLaughlin, a marketing specialist for the University of South Florida, and Reform Party nominee Tony Hernandez. Littlefield defeated both by a wide margin, winning 54 percent of the vote to McLaughlin's 41 percent and Hernandez's 5 percent.

In 2000, Littlefield ran for re-election to a full term and faced a rematch against McLaughlin. He defeated McLaughlin by a wider margin in their rematch, receiving 58 percent of the vote to McLaughlin's 42 percent. In the 2002 legislative session, Littlefield added an amendment to a homestead exemption reform bill that would have allowed "any presidential or gubernatorial appointee" to maintain a homestead exemption in a home that was not their primary residence. After attracting criticism for the amendment's effect on his brother's property tax bill, Littlefield removed the amendment.

Following the reconfiguration of Florida's legislative districts after the 2000 Census, Littlefield's district was redrawn to include more of Pasco County and to swap its eastern Hillsborough County segment for a piece of northern Hillsborough County. In the general election, he faced Pat Burke, an accountant and former Pasco County Commission candidate, who won the Democratic nomination unopposed, and Libertarian Joseph Frank Preta Jr. Littlefield won re-election in a landslide, receiving 59 percent of the vote to Burke's 38 percent and Preta's 3 percent.

Littlefield was unopposed for re-election in 2004. He initially ran for re-election in 2006, but after he was nominated to the Florida Public Service Commission, he dropped his re-election campaign.

== Post-legislative career ==
On September 13, 2006, outgoing Governor Jeb Bush nominated Littlefield to the Public Service Commission. He was sworn in on January 9, 2007, pending State Senate confirmation, but newly elected Governor Charlie Crist announced on January 10 that he would recall Littlefield's appointment, concluding that while Littlefield was "a fine guy," he was "trying to find the most consumer-oriented people." Littlefield and Isilio Arriaga, who also had his nomination revoked, both opted to resign from their positions rather than contest the revocation of their nominations.

Later that year, Crist later appointed Littlefield to serve as the executive director of the Florida Statewide Advocacy Council.

In 2009, Littlefield announced that he would challenge Pasco County Commissioner Pat Mulieri in the Republican primary, and resigned from the Advocacy Council in 2010 to qualify for the race. Mulieri narrowly defeated Littlefield, winning renomination with 52 percent of the vote.

In 2014, Mulieri declined to seek re-election, and Littlefield ran to succeed her. He faced financial advisor Bob Robertson and businessman Mike Moore in the Republican primary, and lost by a wide margin, receiving 28 percent of the vote to Moore's 55 percent.
