= Ed Narain =

American politician (born 1976)

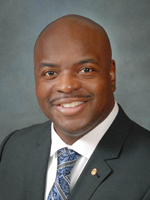

Member of the Florida House of Representatives from the 61st district
- In office November 18, 2014 – November 8, 2016
- Preceded by: Betty Reed
- Succeeded by: Sean Shaw

Personal details
- Born: September 8, 1976 (age 50) New York City, New York, U.S.
- Party: Democratic
- Spouse: Monica Narain
- Education: University of South Florida; Saint Leo University (B.A.) (M.B.A.); Stetson University College of Law (J.D.)
- Profession: Area Manager

Edwin "Ed" Aubron Narain (born September 8, 1976) is an American Democratic politician who served as a member of the Florida House of Representatives, representing the 61st District, which includes West and East Tampa, Progress Village, Sulphur Springs, and the university parts of Tampa in Central and Northern Hillsborough County, from 2014 to 2016.

== History ==
Narain was born in New York City and later moved to Florida, where he grew up in Fort Lauderdale. In 1994, he moved to Tampa to attend the University of South Florida, where he served as the president of the student body from 1997 to 1998. Narain later received his bachelor's degree in psychology from Saint Leo University, where he also received his Master of Business Administration in 2009. Narain works for AT&T as an assistant vice president and serves as a member of the Children's Board of Hillsborough County, the Tampa Bay Chamber, and the Tampa Economic Development Council. In 2013, he graduated from the Stetson University College of Law with his Juris Doctor and received the Dean's Award.

== Florida House of Representatives ==
In 2014, incumbent State Representative Betty Reed was unable to seek re-election due to term limits, so Narain ran to succeed her. He faced Sharon Carter, Tatiana Denson, and Sean Shaw in the Democratic primary, which largely became a contest between Narain and the well-funded Shaw. Shaw earned the endorsement of former Governor Charlie Crist, former Congressman Jim Davis, former Chief Financial Officer of Florida Alex Sink, State Sen. Arthenia Joyner, and a number of state legislators, while Narain earned the endorsement of Reed, former Senate and House Minority Leader; Commissioner Lesley "Les" Miller; former Senator James "Jim" T. Hargrett; former County Commissioner Thomas Scott; retired school board member Doris Ross-Reddick; and former City Councilwoman Gwendolyn Miller. Narain was endorsed by the Florida Sentinel Bulletin and the Tampa Bay Times, which asserted that his "firm grasp of local concerns, sustained volunteerism, and deep community roots reflect a commitment to the district that would translate well in Tallahassee," while Shaw was endorsed by the Tampa Tribune. Ultimately, Narain defeated Shaw, receiving 42% of the vote to Shaw's 34%. In the general election, he faced only write-in opposition and won with 98% of the vote.
