= Florida's 61st House of Representatives district =

Florida district

Florida's 61st State House of Representatives district
Representative
| Linda Chaney; R–St. Pete Beach |

Florida's 61st House of Representatives district elects one member of the Florida House of Representatives. It covers parts of Pinellas County and Hillsborough County.

== Members ==
- Carl Carpenter Jr. (1982–1991)
- Buddy Johnson (1991–1992)
- Carl Littlefield (1992–1999)
- Ken Littlefield (1999–2006)
- Will Weatherford (2006–2012)
- Betty Reed (2012–2014)
- Ed Narain (2014–2016)
- Sean Shaw (2016–2018)
- Dianne Hart (2018–2022)
- Linda Chaney (since 2022)
