= Robert DuBoise =

American former convict

- Born: October 1964 (age 61–62); Tampa, Florida, U.S.
- Known for: DNA exoneration after 37 years of wrongful imprisonment
- Criminal charges: First-degree murder; Attempted sexual battery
- Criminal penalty: Death; commuted to life imprisonment
- Criminal status: Released (exonerated)

Robert Earl DuBoise (born October 1964) is an American who was wrongfully convicted in 1983 for the rape and murder of 19-year-old Barbara Grams in Tampa, Florida. He spent nearly 37 years in prison, including three years on death row, before being exonerated in August 2020 through DNA evidence facilitated by the Innocence Project and the Hillsborough County Conviction Review Unit.

In 2024, DuBoise received a $14 million settlement from the City of Tampa, one of the largest such settlements in Florida, for his wrongful imprisonment.

His case has drawn significant attention for exposing flaws in forensic science, particularly bite mark evidence, and contributing to discussions on justice reform.

== Early life ==
Robert DuBoise was born in 1964 in Tampa, Florida, where he grew up in a working-class family.

== Wrongful conviction ==
On October 22, 1983, DuBoise, then 18, was arrested for the rape and murder of Barbara Grams, a 19-year-old woman found dead behind a Tampa business in August. The prosecution's case relied heavily on discredited bite mark evidence from forensic odontologist Richard Souviron and testimony from a jailhouse informant, who later recanted.

DuBoise was convicted in 1985 and sentenced to death by judge Harry Coe. After his death sentence was overturned in 1988 due to legal errors, he was resentenced to life imprisonment.

On August 25, 2020, a Florida judge vacated DuBoise’s conviction, and he was released from prison after nearly 37 years.

In June 2023, Florida governor Ron DeSantis approved a bill that awarded DuBoise $1.85 million for his wrongful incarceration.

== Exoneration ==
In 2018, the Hillsborough County Conviction Review Unit, established by State Attorney Andrew Warren, began re-examining DuBoise's case at the request of the Innocence Project. New DNA testing, unavailable at the time of his trial, excluded DuBoise as the perpetrator and implicated two other individuals, Amos Robinson and Abron Scott, who were later charged.

The case highlighted the unreliability of bite mark evidence, which has since been widely discredited in forensic science.

== Lawsuit and settlement ==
In 2021, DuBoise filed a federal lawsuit against the City of Tampa, four Tampa police officers, and forensic odontologist Richard Souviron, alleging fabricated evidence and misconduct.

In February 2024, the Tampa City Council agreed to a $14 million settlement, one of the largest in Florida for a wrongful conviction, acknowledging investigative failures.
