= Ashley Moody =

American politician and attorney (born 1975)

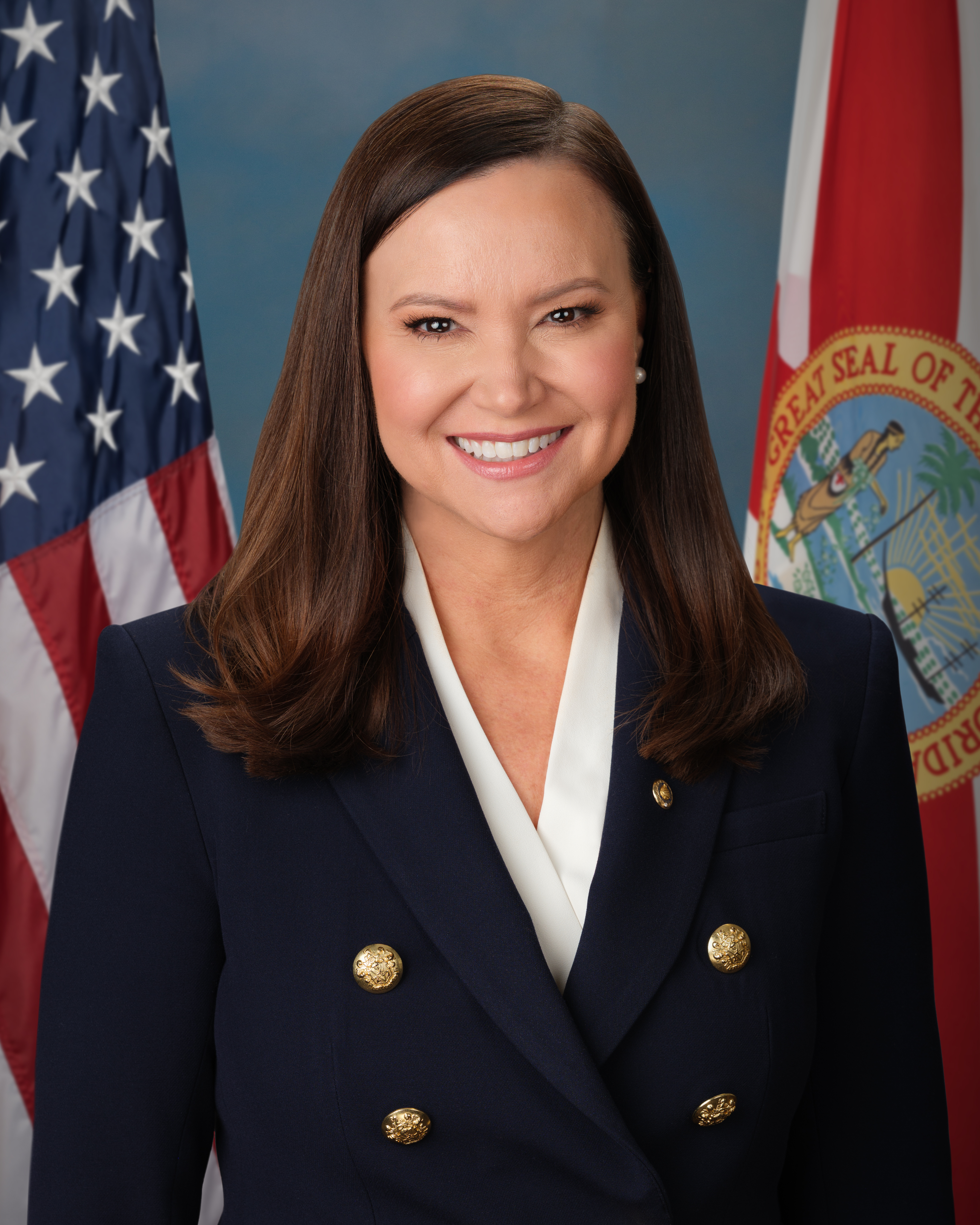
- Official portrait, 2025

United States Senator from Florida
- Incumbent
- Assumed office January 21, 2025 Serving with Rick Scott
- Preceded by: Marco Rubio

38th Florida Attorney General
- In office January 8, 2019 – January 21, 2025
- Governor: Ron DeSantis
- Preceded by: Pam Bondi
- Succeeded by: James Uthmeier

Judge of the Thirteenth Judicial Circuit Court of Florida
- In office January 2, 2007 – April 28, 2017
- Preceded by: Susan Sexton
- Succeeded by: Jennifer Gabbard

Personal details
- Born: Ashley Brooke Moody; March 28, 1975 (age 51) Plant City, Florida, U.S.
- Party: Republican (since 1998)
- Other political affiliations: Democratic (1993‍–‍1998)
- Spouse: Justin Duralia
- Children: 2
- Parent: James S. Moody Jr. (father)
- Education: University of Florida (BS, MS, JD); Stetson University (LLM)
- Website: Senate website Campaign website

Ashley Brooke Moody (born March 28, 1975) is an American politician and attorney serving since 2025 as the junior United States senator from Florida. A member of the Republican Party, she served from 2019 to 2025 as the 38th Florida attorney general.

Born in Plant City, Florida, Moody is an alumna of the University of Florida and Stetson University. She worked in civil litigation and then as an assistant U.S. attorney at the U.S. Attorney's Office in the Middle District of Florida until she was elected as a circuit court judge in Hillsborough County in 2006. She remained in that role until 2017, when she resigned to run for Florida attorney general.

As Florida attorney general, Moody supported lawsuits to invalidate the Affordable Care Act and opposed the legalization of recreational cannabis. She supported President Donald Trump in Florida during the 2020 presidential election, and joined the lawsuit Texas v. Pennsylvania, which sought to overturn the results of the election. In 2024, Moody was involved in the Hope Florida scandal.

In January 2025, Florida Governor Ron DeSantis appointed Moody to the U.S. Senate seat vacated by the resignation of Marco Rubio, who became United States secretary of state in the Trump administration. In the 2026 United States Senate special election in Florida, she defeated Democratic nominee Angie Nixon, and is scheduled to serve until 2029.

== Early life and education ==
Moody was born in Plant City, Florida, on March 28, 1975. She is the oldest of three children born to Carol and Judge James S. Moody Jr.

Moody graduated from Plant City High School in 1993. She received a bachelor's degree and master's degree in accounting from University of Florida. While attending the University of Florida, she served as president of Florida Blue Key. Moody earned a Master of Laws in international law from Stetson University College of Law, and her Juris Doctor from the University of Florida School of Law.

== Early career ==
Moody interned for Martha Barnett, the president of the American Bar Association, and later joined the law firm Holland & Knight, working in civil litigation.

In January 1998, Moody switched her party affiliation from Democratic to Republican as Republicans were set to have a majority in the Florida legislature.

Florida governor Jeb Bush appointed Moody as the student representative on the Board of Regents, a now defunct body that ran the state's university system.

Moody was appointed an assistant U.S. attorney for the Middle District of Florida. In 2006, she was elected to the Thirteenth Judicial Circuit Court of Florida in Hillsborough County.

In 2011, Moody and her family settled a lawsuit that had accused Donald Trump of fraud over a stalled condominium development in Tampa. Later, as Florida attorney general, Moody said she was unable to discuss the matter further, even as she became a prominent surrogate for Trump's 2020 reelection campaign.

== Florida Attorney General (2019–2025) ==
=== Elections ===
On April 28, 2017, Moody resigned from the court to run in the 2018 Florida attorney general election. In the Republican primary, she defeated state representative Frank White. In the general election, Moody defeated Democratic nominee Sean Shaw, a state representative, with 52% of the vote to Shaw's 46%.

Moody was reelected in the 2022 election over Democratic nominee Aramis Ayala by a 21-point margin.

=== Tenure ===
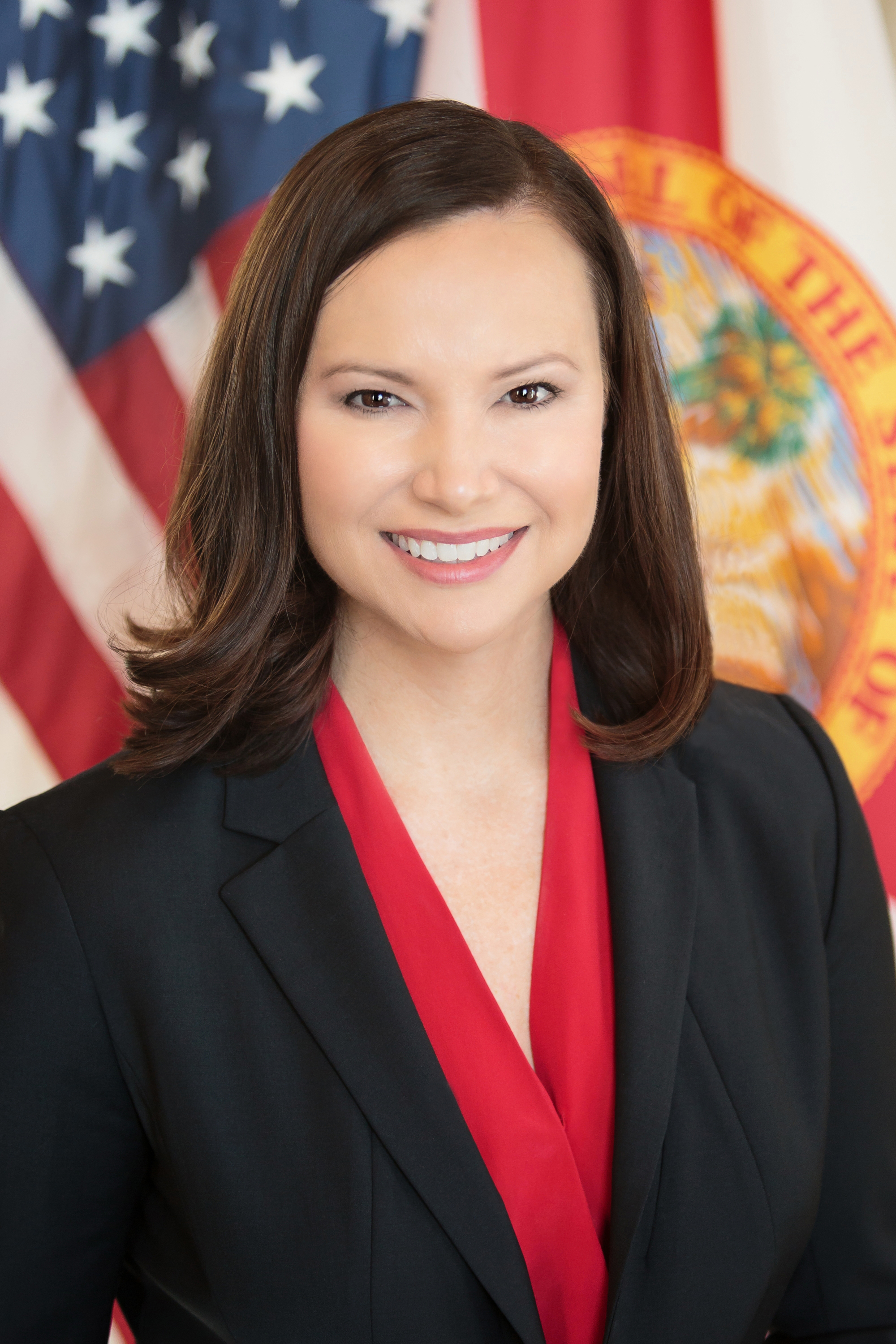
Moody's official portrait as Attorney General, 2019

==== Health care ====
Moody kept Florida in a lawsuit that sought to have the Affordable Care Act deemed unconstitutional.

==== Marijuana ====
Moody argued for the disqualification of a 2022 ballot measure to legalize recreational cannabis in Florida, contending that it was misleading because the summary (which could not be longer than 75 words) did not clarify that cannabis would remain illegal under federal law. The Supreme Court of Florida agreed in a 5–2 ruling, effectively killing the initiative, which had already received 556,049 signatures of 891,589 required to appear on the ballot. Two months later, the court granted Moody's request that a second ballot measure to legalize recreational cannabis be disqualified from the 2022 ballot, in another 5–2 ruling that deemed the measure "affirmatively misleading".

In June 2023, Moody argued for the disqualification of a 2024 ballot measure to legalize recreational cannabis in Florida, filing a 49-page legal brief that asserted once again that the summary failed to make clear that cannabis would remain illegal under federal law, among other arguments. The challenge sought to strike down the initiative, which had received 967,528 of a required 891,523 valid signatures to appear on the ballot. The Florida Supreme Court ruled 5–2 that the initiative would remain on the ballot.

==== Voting rights ====
Moody opposed the restoration of voting rights for former felons. After the Voting Rights Restoration for Felons Initiative passed in 2018, she and Governor Ron DeSantis helped push a bill through the Florida Senate that would restore voting rights to eligible felons only once the felons had paid all their court fees. In 2020, after Michael Bloomberg raised $16 million to pay 32,000 felons' court fees, which would make them eligible to vote in the 2020 elections, Moody asked the Federal Bureau of Investigation and the Florida Department of Law Enforcement to investigate Bloomberg, claiming he potentially violated election laws.

==== 2020 presidential election ====
During the 2020 United States presidential election, Politico called Moody "one of Donald Trump's biggest surrogates" in Florida. After Joe Biden won the election and Trump refused to concede, Moody took a leading role in aiding Trump's attempts to contest the election.

On December 9, 2020, Moody and 15 other state attorneys general announced their support for a lawsuit by Texas attorney general Ken Paxton asking the Supreme Court of the United States to invalidate the presidential election results in Georgia, Michigan, Pennsylvania, and Wisconsin, which were all won by Biden. There was no evidence of large-scale fraud in the election, and the court decided 7-2 not to hear the Texas lawsuit.

Moody was on the board of directors for the Rule of Law Defense Fund. In January 2021, the organization encouraged the gathering at the United States Capitol to call for a halt on the counting of the Electoral College ballots, which they contended were fraudulent. After the pro-Trump mob stormed the Capitol, Moody removed any references to the Rule of Law Defense Fund from her online biography.

==== COVID-19 pandemic ====
In 2021, amid the COVID-19 pandemic, Moody sued the federal government and the CDC for instituting requirements that cruise ships require 95% of passengers to be fully vaccinated.

==== 2022 ethics complaint ====
In September 2022, the advocacy group The 65 Project filed a bar ethics complaint against Moody. The complaint was about her support, as Florida attorney general, for Texas v. Pennsylvania, the lawsuit seeking to invalidate the 2020 presidential election results in four swing states won by Joe Biden.

==== Abortion rights initiative ====
In January 2024, Moody petitioned the Florida Supreme Court to disqualify a ballot measure to expand abortion access, claiming its language could mislead voters. The measure remained on the ballot but failed to garner the necessary 60% of the vote to amend the Florida Constitution.

==== Hope Florida scandal ====
In 2024, Moody authorized the Florida attorney general's office to approve a $67 million state settlement with Medicaid vendor Centene Corporation. A grand jury report leaked in August 2026 concluded that $10 million of the settlement was misappropriated under Governor Ron DeSantis's administration, under an agreement approved by Moody's office.

Under the agreement, approved by Moody's chief deputy, Centene diverted $10 million of the settlement to the Hope Florida Foundation—a charity championed by First Lady Casey DeSantis—rather than to the state treasury. The grand jury found that Moody's office knew of the plan to route funds through the nonprofit, which then transferred the money to political action committees. Moody denied intentional wrongdoing or knowledge of how the funds would ultimately be used. The controversy prompted legislative proposals to limit executive control over settlement funds.

== U.S. Senate (2025–present) ==
=== Appointment ===
On January 16, 2025, Governor Ron DeSantis announced his intention to appoint Moody to the U.S. Senate seat vacated by Marco Rubio, who was nominated to serve as Secretary of State in the second Trump administration.

=== Tenure ===
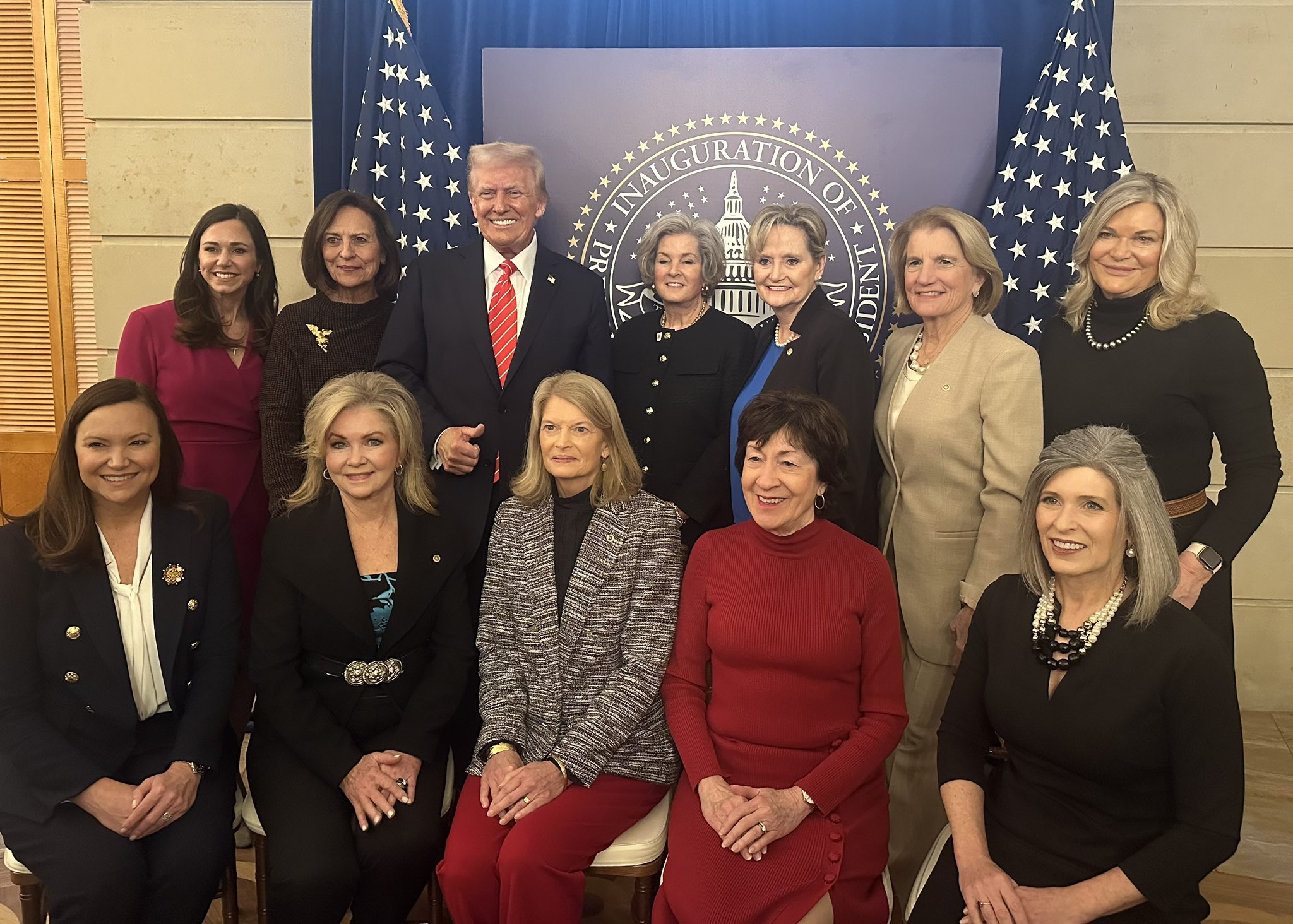
Moody with President Donald Trump, Susie Wiles, and fellow female Republican senators, January 2025

Moody was sworn in on January 21, 2025, along with former Ohio lieutenant governor Jon Husted, by Vice President JD Vance. She was escorted by fellow Florida senator Rick Scott.

In December 2025, Moody voted against extending Affordable Care Act health care premium subsidies.

At a February 2026 press conference in Doral, Florida, Moody, Scott, and Representative Carlos A. Giménez praised the Trump administration's capture of Venezuelan president Nicolás Maduro. Gimenez also said, "the Cuban regime is at the weakest point it's been in a very, very long time". Moody and Scott led Florida's congressional delegation in sending Trump a letter urging him to uphold the existing moratorium on oil and gas leasing off Florida's Gulf and east coasts, citing risks to the state's tourism industry and military operations.

In February 2026, Moody issued a statement of support for Trump's initial strikes in the 2026 Iran war. In March 2026, she voted against a war powers resolution that would have limited the war in Iran until congressional authorization was obtained.

=== Committee assignments ===
- Committee on Health, Education, Labor, and Pensions
  - Subcommittee on Education and the American Family
  - Subcommittee on Primary Health and Retirement Security
- Committee on Homeland Security and Governmental Affairs
  - Permanent Subcommittee on Investigations
  - Subcommittee on Border Management, Federal Workforce, and Regulatory Affairs
  - Subcommittee on Disaster Management, District of Columbia, and Census
- Committee on the Judiciary
  - Subcommittee on Antitrust, Competition Policy and Consumer Rights
  - Subcommittee on Border Security and Immigration
  - Subcommittee on Intellectual Property
  - Subcommittee on Privacy, Technology and the Law
- Joint Economic Committee
- Senate Special Committee on Aging

== Personal life ==
Moody is married to Justin Duralia, the deputy chief of the Plant City Police Department and a former Drug Enforcement Administration officer. They have two children.

== Electoral history ==
2006 Thirteenth Judicial Court of Florida election, Non-partisan primary
Party	Candidate	Votes	%	±%
Republican	Ashley Moody	41,522	39.08%	N/A
Democratic	Gary Dolgin	33,675	31.70%	N/A
Independent	Pat Courtney	31,042	29.22%	N/A
Majority		7,847	7.38%	N/A
Turnout		106,239		

2006 Thirteenth Judicial Court of Florida election, General election
Party	Candidate	Votes	%	±%
Republican	Ashley Moody	142,610	60.31%	N/A
Democratic	Gary Dolgin	93,854	39.69%	N/A
Majority		48,756	20.62%	N/A
Turnout		236,464		

2018 Florida Attorney General election, Republican primary
Party	Candidate	Votes	%	±%
Republican	Ashley Moody	882,028	56.80%	N/A
Republican	Frank White	670,823	43.20%	N/A
Majority		211,205	13.60%	N/A
Turnout		1,552,851		

2018 Florida Attorney General election, General election
Party	Candidate	Votes	%	±%
Republican	Ashley Moody	4,232,532	52.11%	−2.96%
Democratic	Sean Shaw	3,744,912	46.10%	+4.09%
Independent	Jeffrey Marc Siskind	145,296	1.79%	N/A
Majority		487,620	6.01%	−7.07%
Turnout		8,122,740		
Republican hold				

2022 Florida Attorney General election, General election
Party	Candidate	Votes	%	±%
Republican	Ashley Moody (incumbent)	4,651,279	60.59%	+8.48%
Democratic	Aramis Ayala	3,025,943	39.41%	−6.69%
Total votes		7,677,222	100.0%	
Republican hold				

== See also ==
- List of new members of the 119th United States Congress
- Women in the United States Senate

Party political offices
Preceded by Pam Bondi	Republican nominee for Florida Attorney General; 2018, 2022	Succeeded by James Uthmeier
Preceded by Marco Rubio	Republican nominee for U.S. Senator from Florida (Class 3); 2026	Most recent
Legal offices
Preceded by Pam Bondi	Florida Attorney General; 2019–2025	Succeeded by John Guard; Acting
U.S. Senate
Preceded by Marco Rubio	U.S. Senator (Class 3) from Florida; 2025–present Served alongside: Rick Scott	Incumbent
U.S. order of precedence (ceremonial)
Preceded by Jon Husted	United States senators by seniority 98th	Succeeded by Alan Armstrong
