= Henry Coe =

Henry Coe may refer to:

- Henry Waldo Coe (1857–1927), American frontier physician and politician
- Henry Willard Coe, Jr. (died 1943), namesake of the Henry W. Coe State Park
