= Jefferson Correctional Institution =

Prison in Florida, United States

Coordinates: 30°30′35″N 83°48′03″W

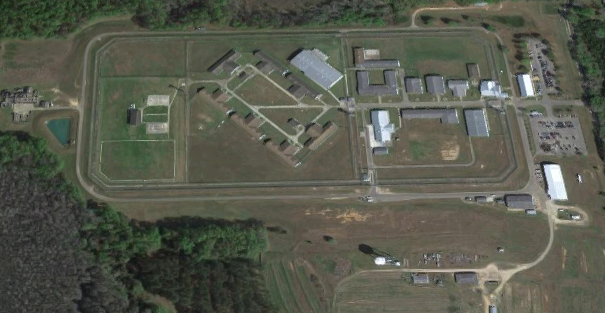
- Overhead view of JEFCI
- Interactive map of Jefferson Correctional Institution
- Location: 1050 Big Joe Road Monticello, Florida
- Status: Operational
- Security class: Minimum, medium, and close
- Capacity: 1,503 = 1,348 (main) + 155 (satellites)
- Population: 1,411 = 1.269 (main) + 142 (satellites) (April 14, 2026)
- Opened: 1990
- Managed by: Florida Department of Corrections
- Warden: Gary Hewett

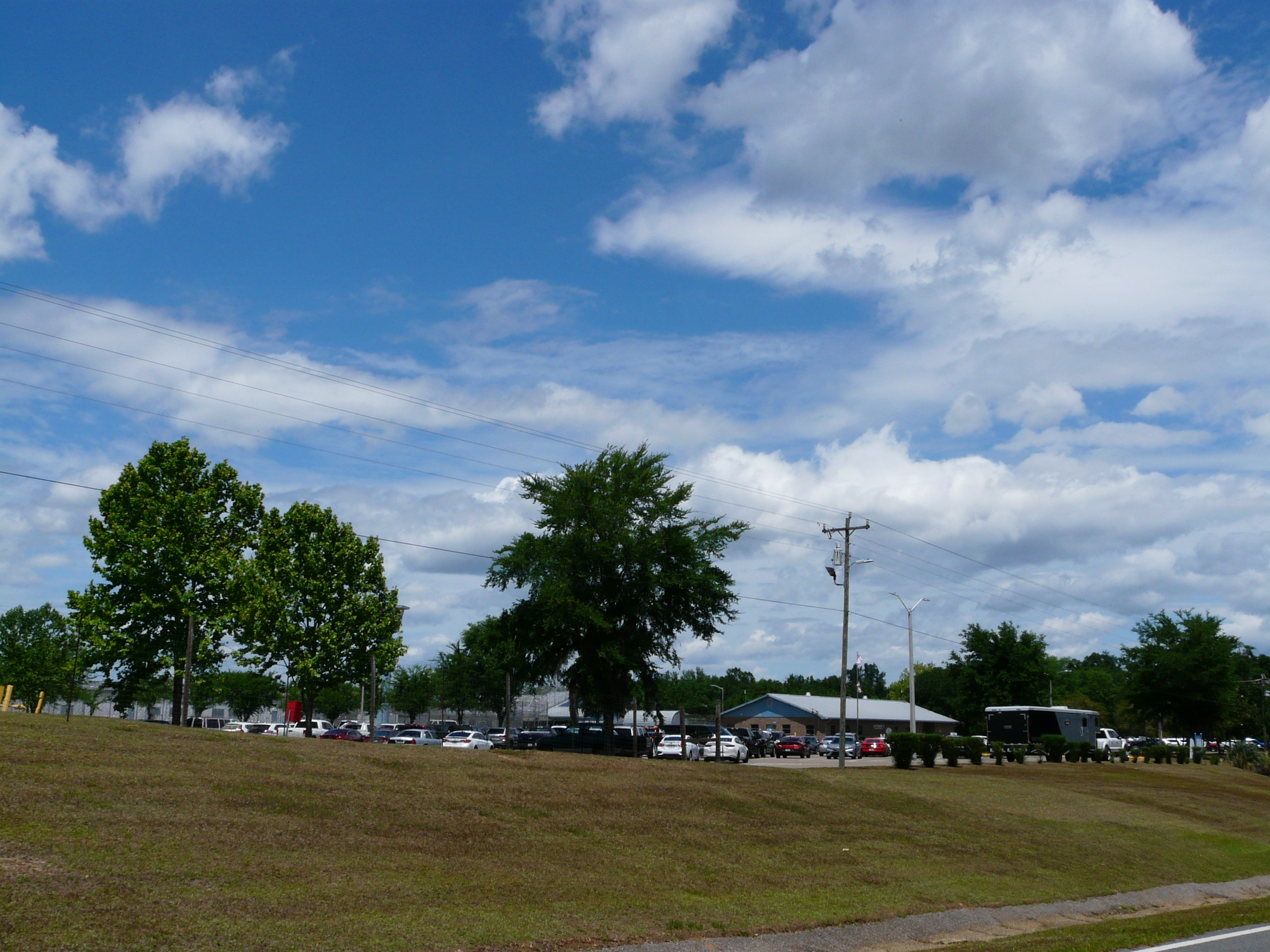
Parking lots and entrance building for the Jefferson Correctional Institution

Jefferson Correctional Institution (JEFCI) is a state-operated prison for men located in unincorporated Jefferson County, Florida, with a Monticello postal address, owned and operated by the Florida Department of Corrections.

Jefferson has a mix of security levels, including minimum, medium, and close, and houses adult male offenders. Jefferson first opened in 1990 and has a maximum capacity of 1,503 prisoners, with additional capacity for 155 prisoners in two community release centers.

== Notable Inmates ==
- Steven Williams
