= Dianne Hart =

American politician

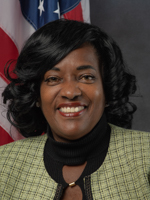

Member of the Florida House of Representatives
- Incumbent
- Assumed office November 6, 2018
- Preceded by: Sean Shaw
- Succeeded by: Jacqueline Coffie-Leeks (elect)
- Constituency: 61st district (2018–2022); 63rd district (2022–present)

Personal details
- Born: June 26, 1955 (age 71)
- Party: Democratic

Dianne Langston Hart (born June 26, 1955) is a Democratic member of the Florida Legislature representing the State's 63rd House district.

== Career ==
Hart was elected unopposed on November 6, 2018, from the platform of Democratic Party.
