= 2006 Florida elections =

Elections were held in Florida on November 7, 2006.

== Federal elections ==
=== US Senate ===
Democrat Bill Nelson was re-elected.

- Katherine Harris (Republican Party)
- Bill Nelson (Democratic Party)
- Brian Moore (NPA)
- Roy Tanner (NPA)
- Belinda Noah (NPA)
- Floyd Ray Frazier (NPA)

== State Executive offices ==
=== Governor ===
Republican governor Jeb Bush was term-limited and was succeeded by Republican Charlie Crist.

- Charlie Crist (Republican Party)
- Jim Davis (Democratic Party)
- Max Linn (Reform Party)
- Richard Paul Dembinsky (No party)
- John Wayne Smith (No party)
- Karl C. C. Behm (No party)

=== Attorney General ===
- Skip Campbell (Democratic Party)
- Bill McCollum (Republican Party)

Republican Bill McCollum was elected.

=== Chief Financial Officer ===
- Tom Lee (Republican Party)
- Alex Sink (Democratic Party)

Democrat Alex Sink was elected.

=== Commissioner of Agriculture ===
- Charles Bronson (Republican Party)
- Eric Copeland (politician) (Democratic Party)

Republican Charles Bronson was re-elected.

== Judicial ==
Florida voters had to decide whether each of the following would remain in office.

=== Justices of the Florida Supreme Court ===
All three justices were retained:

- R. Fred Lewis
- Barbara Pariente
- Peggy Quince

Justice Lewis retention election results by county Yes: 70–80%; 60–70%; 50–60%; No: 50–60%

Justice Pariente retention election results by county Yes: 70–80%; 60–70%; 50–60%; No: 50–60%

Justice Quince retention election results by county Yes: 70–80%; 60–70%; 50–60%; No: 50–60%

=== Florida District Courts of Appeal ===
Voters had to choose whether to retain any of the judges in their respective circuit court.

Map of the jurisdictions of Florida's District Courts of Appeal.

==== First District Court of Appeal (Tallahassee) ====
- Brad Thomas
- Peter Webster

==== Fourth District Court of Appeal (West Palm Beach) ====
- Bobby W. Gunther
- Fred A. Hazouri
- Larry A. Klein
- Barry J. Stone
- Carole Y. Taylor

== Amendments to the Florida Constitution ==
Every amendment passed.

=== No. 1: State Planning and Budget Process ===
Official summary: Proposing amendments to the State Constitution to limit the amount of nonrecurring general revenue which may be appropriated for recurring purposes in any fiscal year to 3 percent of the total general revenue funds estimated to be available, unless otherwise approved by a three-fifths vote of the Legislature; to establish a Joint Legislative Budget Commission, which shall issue long-range financial outlooks; to provide for limited adjustments in the state budget without the concurrence of the full Legislature, as provided by general law; to reduce the number of times trust funds are automatically terminated; to require the preparation and biennial revision of a long-range state planning document; and to establish a Government Efficiency Task Force and specify its duties.

Amendment 1 results by county Yes: 70–80%; 60–70%; 50–60%; No: 50–60%

=== No. 3: Requiring Broader Public Support for Constitutional Amendments or Revisions ===
Official summary: Proposes an amendment to Section 5 of Article XI of the State Constitution to require that any proposed amendment to or revision of the State Constitution, whether proposed by the Legislature, by initiative, or by any other method, must be approved by at least 60 percent of the voters of the state voting on the measure, rather than by a simple majority. This proposed amendment would not change the current requirement that a proposed constitutional amendment imposing a new state tax or fee be approved by at least 2/3 of the voters of the state voting in the election in which such an amendment is considered.

Amendment 3 results by county Yes: 70–80%; 60–70%; 50–60%; No: 50–60%

=== No. 4: Protect People Especially Youth, From Addiction, Disease, and Other Health Hazards of Using Tobacco ===
Official summary: To protect people, especially youth, from addiction, disease, and other health hazards of using tobacco, the Legislature shall use some Tobacco Settlement money annually for a comprehensive statewide tobacco education and prevention program using Centers for Disease Control best practices. Specifies some program components, emphasizing youth, requiring one-third of total annual funding for advertising. Annual funding is 15% of 2005 Tobacco Settlement payments to Florida, adjusted annually for inflation. Provides definitions. Effective immediately.

Amendment 4 results by county Yes: 70–80%; 60–70%; 50–60%; No: 50–60%

=== No. 6: Increased Homestead Exemption ===
Official summary: Proposing amendment of the State Constitution to increase the maximum additional homestead exemption for low-income seniors from $25,000 to $50,000 and to schedule the amendment to take effect January 1, 2007.

Amendment 6 results by county Yes: 80–90%; 70–80%; 60–70%

=== No. 7: Permanently Disabled Veterans' Discount on Homestead Ad Valorem Tax ===
Official summary: Proposing an amendment to the State Constitution to provide a discount from amount of ad valorem tax on homestead of a partially or totally permanently disabled veteran who is age 65 or older who was a Florida resident at the time of entering military service, whose disability was combat-related, and who was honorably discharged, to specify percentage of the discount as equal to the percentage of veteran's permanent service-connected disability; to specify qualification requirements for the discount; to authorize the Legislature to waive the annual application requirement in subsequent years by general law; and to specify that the provision takes effect December 7, 2006, is self-executing, and does not require implementing legislation.

Amendment 7 results by county Yes: 80–90%; 70–80%; 60–70%

=== No. 8: Eminent Domain ===
Official summary: Proposing an amendment to the State Constitution to prohibit the transfer of private property taken by eminent domain to a natural person or private entity, providing that the Legislature may by general law passed by a three-fifths vote of the membership of each house of the Legislature permit exceptions allowing the transfer of such private property; and providing that this prohibition on the transfer of private property taken by eminent domain is applicable if the petition of taking that initiated the condemnation proceeding was filed on or after January 2, 2007.

Amendment 8 results by county Yes: 80–90%; 70–80%; 60–70%; 50–60%

== See also ==
- Government of Florida
