= Southeastern College =

Private college in Florida, U.S.

- Former names: Cruise Career Institute, Keiser Career Institute, Keiser Career College
- Established: 1988
- Academic affiliations: Accrediting Commission of Career Schools and Colleges
- Executive Director: Robert M. Keiser
- Academic staff: 65
- Administrative staff: 55
- Students: 1,000+
- Undergraduates: 1,000+
- Location: Miami Lakes (FL), Boynton Beach (FL), Charlotte (NC), Columbia (SC), North Charleston (SC), Florida, United States
- Colors: Royal Blue and Yellow
- Website: www.sec.edu

Southeastern College is a private institution of higher learning with campuses in Miami Lakes, Boynton Beach, Florida, Charlotte, North Carolina, Columbia, South Carolina, North Charleston, South Carolina.

Southeastern College is institutionally accredited by the Accrediting Commission of Career Schools and Colleges (ACCSC) and licensed by the Commission for Independent Education (CIE), Florida Department of Education.

== History ==
Southeastern College was founded in 1988 as Cruise Career Training Institute with a specialization in training students and employees for careers in the travel industry. In 1997, the school expanded its career education offerings to include academic programs in business, computer science, and allied health. Following a series of name changes, the school became Southeastern College in 2012. In 2015, the West Palm Beach campus opened.

== Academics ==
Southeastern College awards diplomas, associate, and bachelor's degrees. The school offers 10 diploma programs, eight associate degrees, and one bachelor's degree. A majority of the school's academic programs are in the allied health programs. The school has recently expanded its offerings into business and technology. The school began enrolling for its first bachelor's degree, a Bachelor of Science in Nursing, in 2020.

== Accreditation ==
=== Institutional accreditation ===
Southeastern College is accredited by the Accrediting Commission of Career Schools and Colleges.

=== Programmatic accreditation ===
- The Medical Assisting degree programs are accredited by the Accrediting Bureau of Health Education Schools (ABHES).
- The Associate of Science Degree in Surgical Technology programs and the pharmacy technology programs are accredited by the Commission on Accreditation of Allied Health Education Programs (CAAHEP).
- The Associate of Science in Nursing Degree program at the Miami Lakes Campus is accredited by the Accreditation Commission for Education in Nursing (ACEN).
- The pharmacy technology programs are accredited by the American Society of Health System Pharmacists (ASHSP).
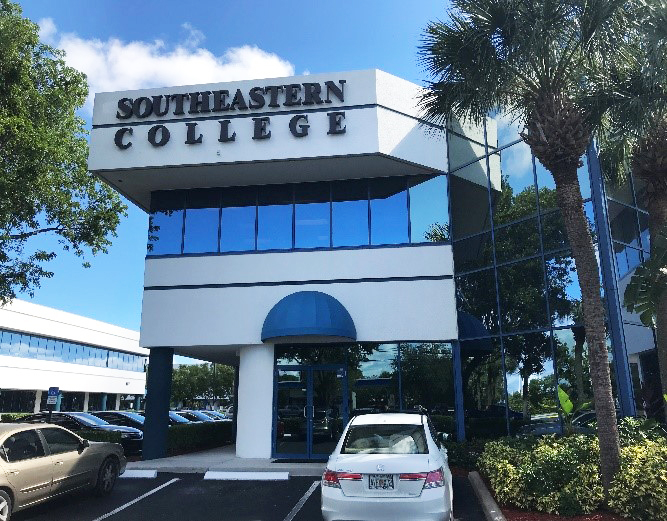
  Southeastern College West Palm Beach

== Awards and recognition ==
In 2018, Southeastern College was named the School of the Year by the Florida Association of Post-Secondary Schools and Colleges (FAPSC). The same year, the president of the Miami Lakes campus, Julia Corona, was named the FAPSC Administrator of the Year. In 2020, Dana Hutton, campus president at Southeastern College's West Palm Beach campus, was named FAPSC Administrator of the Year. Southeastern College was named one of the South Florida Sun Sentinel's Top Workplaces for 2020.

=== Rankings ===
- 2021 Niche.com Best Colleges with Surgical Technologist Degrees in Florida
- 2021 Best Colleges with Massage Therapy and Bodywork Degrees in South Carolina

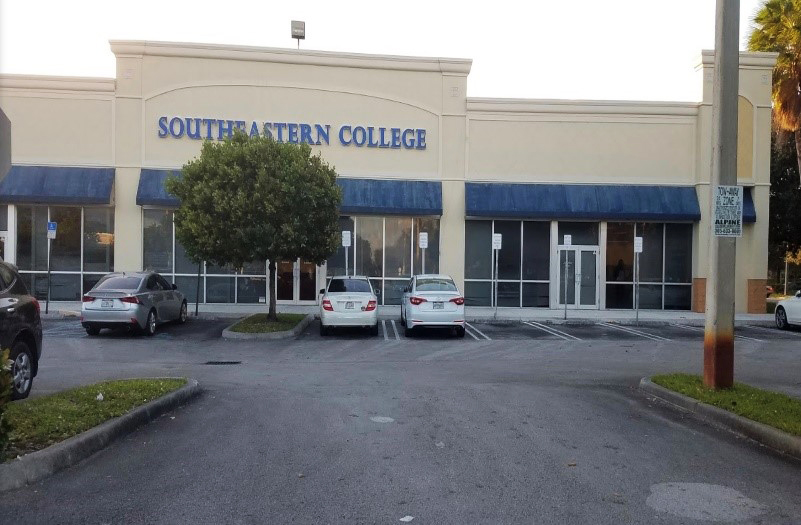
Southeastern College Miami Lakes

== See also ==
- List of colleges and universities in Florida
- Lists of American universities and colleges
