= Betty Reed =

American politician (1941–2022)

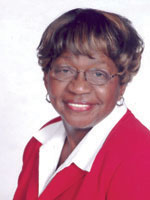

Member of the Florida House of Representatives from the 61st district
- In office November 20, 2012 – November 18, 2014
- Preceded by: Will Weatherford
- Succeeded by: Ed Narain

Member of the Florida House of Representatives from the 59th district
- In office November 21, 2006 – November 20, 2012
- Preceded by: Arthenia Joyner
- Succeeded by: Ross Spano

Personal details
- Born: May 5, 1941 Pelham, Georgia, U.S.
- Died: May 20, 2022 (aged 81)
- Party: Democratic
- Education: National-Louis University (B.S.)
- Profession: Educator

Betty Reed (May 5, 1941 – May 20, 2022) was a Democratic politician who served as a member of the Florida House of Representatives from 2006 to 2014, representing the 59th District from 2006 to 2012 and the 61st District, which included downtown Tampa in northern Hillsborough County, from 2012 to 2014.

== History ==
Reed was born in Pelham, Georgia, and moved to the state of Florida in 1957. She attended National-Louis University, where she received a degree in behavioral science. Following graduation, she owned a small sandwich shop in Ybor City during the 1980s. She then started working for Remington College, where she was an assistant to the president, the director of financial aid and financial assistance, and then the director of career services. Additionally, she served as the President of the Lucy-Dell Civic Association and the Associate Director of the North Tampa Chamber of Commerce.

== Florida House of Representatives ==
When incumbent State Representative Arthenia Joyner opted to run for the Florida Senate rather than seek re-election, Reed ran to succeed her in the 59th District, which stretched from University to Gibsonton and included much of Tampa in Hillsborough County. In the Democratic primary, she faced Warren Dawson and Hakim Aquil, and she emerged narrowly victorious, winning 47% of the vote and defeating Dawson by a little more than 300 votes. In the general election, she faced Willis "K.C." Bowick, the Republican nominee. Reed campaigned on educational reforms, including closing the achievement gap in students of different races, smaller classrooms, and providing new teachers with mentors. Owing to the district's strong partisan lean, Reed defeated Bowick in a landslide, winning 84% of the vote. In 2008, Dawson, whom she defeated in the primary two years prior, challenged her again, but once again, Reed emerged victorious, defeating Dawson with 70% of the vote. She won the general election entirely uncontested, and in 2010, she was re-elected without opposition at all.

In 2012, following the reconfiguration of legislative districts, Reed was moved to the 61st District, which included most of the territory that she had previously represented. She was opposed in the Democratic primary by Tatiana Denson, who advocated for "generational change" in the election. Ultimately, Reed easily turned away Denson's challenge, winning the renomination of her party with 81% of the vote. She was unopposed in the general election, and won her final term in the legislature entirely uncontested.

== Personal life ==
Reed died on May 20, 2022, at the age of 81.
