= Susan Lopez =

State Attorney for the Thirteenth Judicial Circuit of Florida

State Attorney for the Thirteenth Judicial Circuit of Florida
- Incumbent
- Assumed office August 4, 2022

Personal details
- Party: Republican
- Education: Suffolk University Law School
- Alma mater: Middlebury College

Susan Lopez (born c. 1976/77) is an American prosecutor and politician who has served as the State Attorney for the Thirteenth Judicial Circuit of Florida since August 4, 2022.

== Personal life and education ==
Lopez is a Tampa native and graduated from Plant High School. She earned her bachelor’s degree from Middlebury College and her Juris Doctor from Suffolk University Law School. Lopez is an alumna of Leadership Tampa alumna and a member of the Junior League of Tampa. Lopez is an active lifelong member of St. John’s Episcopal Church, and previously served as Junior Warden of the Vestry.

== Career ==
Lopez began her legal career at the 2nd District Court of Appeal before joining the 13th Judicial Circuit of Florida as an Assistant State Attorney in 2005. In December 2021, she was appointed as a County Court Judge by Governor Ron DeSantis.

On August 4, 2022, Governor DeSantis appointed Lopez as State Attorney for the 13th Judicial Circuit after he suspended State Attorney Andrew Warren. In the 2024 election, Warren challenged Lopez for his old job, but she defeated him and was officially elected to her position. Lopez manages two offices that handle approximately 50,000 criminal cases every year. Lopez is a member of the Hillsborough County Bar Association and serves on the Board of Directors for the Tampa Bay Area Chiefs of Police Association, the Boys and Girls Club Foundation, and NOPE (Narcotics Overdose Prevention and Education) Hillsborough.

== Electoral history ==
State Attorney for the 13th Judicial Circuit of Florida (2024 General Election)
Party	Candidate	Votes	%
Republican	Susan Lopez	344,065	52.66
Democratic	Andrew H. Warren	309,313	47.34
Total votes		653,378	100.0
Republican gain from Democratic			
