= Florida's 63rd House of Representatives district =

Florida district

Florida's 63rd State House of Representatives district
Representative
Dianne Hart; D–Tampa

Florida's 63rd House of Representatives district elects one member of the Florida House of Representatives. It covers parts of Hillsborough County.

== Members ==
- Dianne Hart (since 2022)
