= Aramis Ayala =

American politician and attorney (born 1975)

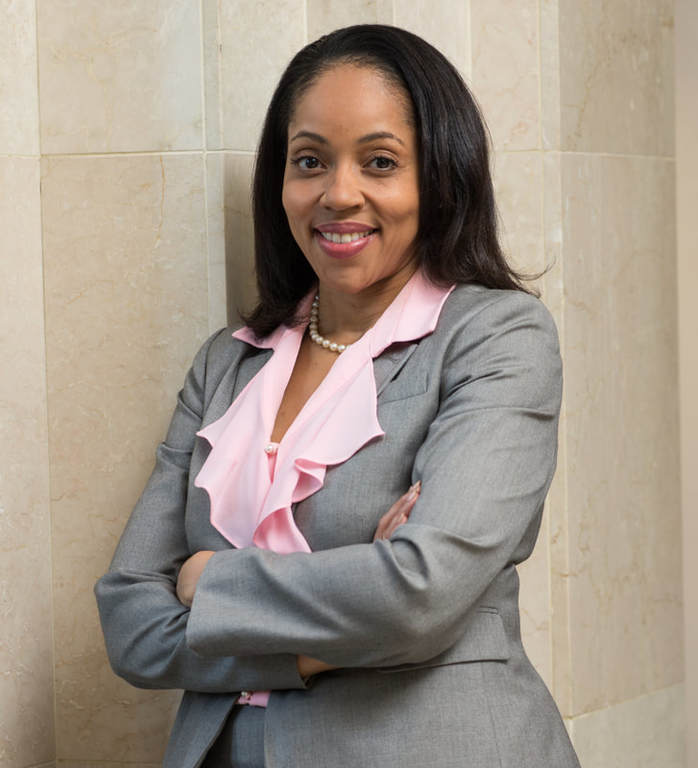

State attorney for the Ninth Judicial Circuit Court of Florida
- In office January 1, 2017 – January 1, 2021
- Preceded by: Jeff Ashton
- Succeeded by: Monique Worrell

Personal details
- Born: February 2, 1975 (age 51) Saginaw, Michigan, U.S.
- Party: Democratic
- Spouse: David Ayala
- Education: University of Michigan (BA); University of Central Florida (MS); University of Detroit (JD)

Aramis Ayala (born February 2, 1975) is an American politician and prosecutor who was the state attorney for the Ninth Judicial Circuit Court of Florida. She was elected in November 2016, and served as the chief prosecutor from 2017 to 2021. In May 2019, Ayala stated that she would not seek re-election as state attorney.

Ayala was the Democratic nominee in the 2022 Florida Attorney General election. Ayala lost the general election to incumbent Ashley Moody.

== Early life and education ==
Ayala was born in Saginaw, Michigan, and graduated from the University of Michigan with an undergraduate degree. She then obtained her Juris Doctor degree from the University of Detroit.

== Career ==
=== State attorney ===
Ayala announced she would not seek capital punishment in any case, causing Florida Governor Rick Scott to reassign potential death penalty cases to another State Attorney. Ayala has filed lawsuits disputing this action in the Supreme Court of Florida, and in federal court. Ayala lost her Supreme Court case against Scott. The Supreme Court of Florida (with one dissent) ruled against Ayala, saying that the governor was within his power to take cases away from Ayala because of her position to abandon the death penalty in all cases before her and not to exercise her discretion in each individual case.

In July 2017, a video of two police officers pulling over Ayala went viral, due to allegations of racial profiling. Ayala requested the officers' information during the encounter, but did not take any legal action, writing that the stop "appears consistent with Florida law."

=== 2022 campaign ===
In May 2021, Ayala announced that she was running for Florida's 10th congressional district in 2022. Initially considering a run for the U.S. Senate, she decided to run for Congress after incumbent U.S. Representative Val Demings announced she would run for United States Senate in 2022 against incumbent Republican Marco Rubio. She later withdrew to run for Attorney General. Ayala lost the general election to incumbent Ashley Moody.

== 2022 Attorney General election results ==
2022 Florida attorney general election results map by county Map legend: Moody—50-60%; Moody—60-70%; Moody—70-80%; Moody—80-90%; Moody—>90%; Ayala—50-60%

Incumbent Republican attorney general Ashley Moody ran for reelection, being challenged by Democrat Aramis Ayala, a former state attorney. Moody defeated Ayala in the general election by a 20-point margin.

Florida attorney general election, 2022
Party	Candidate	Votes	%
Republican	Ashley Moody (incumbent)	4,651,376	60.6
Democratic	Aramis Ayala	3,025,959	39.4
Total votes		7,677,335	100.0
Republican hold			

Party political offices
Preceded by Sean Shaw	Democratic nominee for Florida Attorney General; 2022	Most recent
