= Andrew H. Warren =

American prosecutor and politician

Andrew Warren
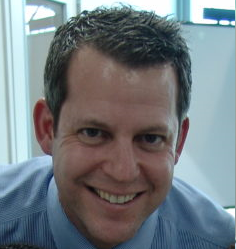

State Attorney for the Thirteenth Judicial Circuit of Florida
- In office January 3, 2017 – January 7, 2025; Suspended: August 4, 2022 – January 7, 2025 (Note: Susan Lopez served as acting State Attorney for the duration of Warren’s suspension)
- Preceded by: Mark Ober
- Succeeded by: Susan Lopez

Personal details
- Born: Andrew Howard Warren; January 1, 1977 (age 49) Gainesville, Florida, U.S.
- Party: Democratic
- Children: 3
- Education: Brandeis University (BA); Columbia University (JD)

Andrew Howard Warren (born 1977) is an American prosecutor and politician who served as the state attorney for the Thirteenth Judicial Circuit of Florida, covering Hillsborough County, from 2017 through his August 2022 suspension by Governor Ron DeSantis. On June 22, 2023, the Florida State Supreme Court dismissed a suit filed by Warren challenging his dismissal. In Warren's federal lawsuit, the case remains pending at the district court level after a U.S. Court of Appeals remanded the case in early 2024. Warren was previously a federal prosecutor in the fraud division at the United States Department of Justice.

== Early life ==
Andrew Howard Warren was born in 1977 in Gainesville, Florida. He has a younger sister and two older brothers. His father, originally from Boston, moved in the 1970s to teach at the University of Florida. Warren played baseball and soccer at Eastside High School. He attended Brandeis University where he studied political science and economics. He studied abroad his junior year at the London School of Economics. Warren graduated from the Columbia Law School in 2002. He was admitted to The Florida Bar on July 10, 2003.

== Career ==
Warren clerked for U.S. district judge, Samuel Conti. He worked for Latham & Watkins before joining the United States Department of Justice where he worked in the fraud section under Paul Pelletier. In 2009, he helped prosecute Texas financier Allen Stanford alongside Gregg Costa and William Stellmach.

In November 2016, Democrat Warren narrowly defeated incumbent Republican prosecutor Mark Ober 50.4 to 49.6 percent to become the state attorney of Florida's 13th Judicial Circuit, Hillsborough County. He campaigned as a progressive prosecutor focused on public safety, fairness and justice. Warren claims that criminal justice reform is needed to maximize long-term public safety by focusing on all the goals of the system: accountability and punishment, reducing recidivism, rehabilitation, and victims' rights. He took office on January 3, 2017. In 2018, Warren established a conviction review unit. Through working with the Innocence Project, the unit led to the exoneration of Robert DuBoise who was imprisoned for 37 years. In April 2020, he prosecuted a megachurch pastor for violating COVID-19 lockdown requirements. Warren dropped the charges after governor Ron DeSantis passed an executive order. In 2020, he was reelected by 53 percent to a second four-year term.

In June 2022, he signed a statement with other prosecutors in opposition to prosecuting individuals who sought or provided abortions. Citing this statement, Gov. DeSantis suspended Warren on August 4, 2022. Hillsborough County Judge Susan Lopez was appointed by DeSantis as acting state attorney. In January 2023, Federal Judge Robert Hinkle found that DeSantis had violated Warren's first amendment rights and the Constitution of Florida. Hinkle stated that the federal courts lacked the authority to reinstate Warren as it is a state law issue. In February 2023, Warren appealed the ruling to the United States Court of Appeals for the Eleventh Circuit. Meanwhile, in June 2023, the Florida Supreme Court ruled that Warren had engaged in an unreasonable delay in requesting their help, and therefore decided not to address the merits of his case.

In January 2024, a three-judge panel of the 11th Circuit Court of Appeals ruled in favor of Warren. The opinion, authored by Judge Jill A. Pryor, stated that Hinkle does have the authority to reinstate Warren and sent the case back for review, giving DeSantis an opportunity to provide justification for the suspension without violating Warren's rights under the First Amendment. On April 16, 2024, while his federal lawsuit remained pending, Warren announced that he was seeking re-election as Hillsborough’s state attorney. In the November 2024 general election, Warren faced Susan "Suzy" Lopez, the Republican appointed by Gov. DeSantis to replace him. Unlike his counterpart in Orange-Osceola, Monique Worrell, also dismissed by the governor, Warren lost his bid for re-election.

== Personal life ==
Warren met Alexandra Coler on his first day at Brandeis University. They parted ways before marrying in 2006 in Philadelphia. On August 4, 2009, his wife was in a car accident while she was eight months pregnant. His son, Zack, died shortly after birth. They later had two daughters.

== Electoral history ==
State Attorney of Florida's 13th Judicial Circuit, Hillsborough County, 2016 general election results
Party	Candidate	Votes	%
Democratic	Andrew H. Warren	288,883	50.44
Republican	Mark Ober (incumbent)	283,843	49.56
Total votes		572,726	100.0
Democratic gain from Republican			

State Attorney of Florida's 13th Judicial Circuit, Hillsborough County, 2020 general election results
Party	Candidate	Votes	%
Democratic	Andrew H. Warren (incumbent)	369,129	53.37
Republican	Mike Perotti	322,506	46.63
Total votes		691,635	100.0
Democratic hold			

State Attorney of Florida's 13th Judicial Circuit, Hillsborough County, 2024 general election results
Party	Candidate	Votes	%
Republican	Suzy Lopez	344,065	52.66
Democratic	Andrew H. Warren	309,313	47.34
Total votes		653,378	100.0
Republican gain from Democratic			
