= Harry Coe (attorney) =

American attorney

- Born: February 13, 1932; New York City, U.S.
- Died: July 13, 2000 (aged 68); Tampa, Florida, U.S.

Harry Lee Coe III (February 13, 1932 – July 13, 2000) was a circuit judge and then state attorney of Hillsborough County, Florida.

== Early life ==
He was born in Brooklyn, New York, before moving to Florida, where he attended Lakeland High School. He then attended University of Florida on a baseball and basketball scholarship. He is considered one of the best players in school history and was one of the first pitchers to be named to the All-SEC team.

He played minor league baseball in 1953 and from 1956 to 1958, going 26–3 with a 1.36 ERA in 264 innings for the Tampa Tarpons in 1957 and 18–12 with a 2.41 mark for the team in 1958. Overall, he was 57–37 in his professional career.

He later attended law school at Stetson University.

== Career in law ==
Prior to his tenure as State Attorney, he was a circuit judge, serving in that role for 22 years. He was nicknamed "Hangin' Harry" for handing down what were considered extreme jail sentences. He became State Attorney in 1992.

His career in law was mired in controversy. He accumulated thousands of dollars in gambling debts and used re-election campaign funds, among money from other outside sources, to pay them off. His money issues sparked an investigation.

== Death ==
He committed suicide on July 13, 2000, dying in Tampa, Florida. The media's involvement in his suicide was highly scrutinized, as some believed its "hound[ing]" of Coe about "allegations and innuendos" led him to kill himself. Others opined he received "unfair treatment ... from the media." Said his former wife: "I'm not saying the media caused him to go to his death, but they certainly were a part of it. I'll always believe that." Considerable flak was taken by WFLA-TV reporter Steve Andrews, who released a story on Coe prior to his death.

== Robert DuBoise controversy ==
Robert DuBoise, who was wrongfully convicted of rape and murder of Barbara Grams on August 18, 1983, and sentenced to death by judge Harry Coe, was exonerated and released on August 27, 2020 after spending 37 years in jail.
