= 2025 Florida state legislative special elections =

Seven state legislative special elections were held in the U.S. State of Florida throughout 2025. Under Florida's resign-to-run law, state legislators who desire another political office are required to give up their current seat, necessitating a special election.

== Election schedule ==
Source: Florida Division of Elections. As of July 22, 2025.

- April 1: Primary in HD 3, HD 32, and SD 19
- June 10: General in HD 3, HD 32, and SD 19
- June 24: Primary in HD 40, SD 15
- September 2: General in HD 40, SD 15
- September 30: Primary in HD 90, SD 11
- December 9: General in HD 90, SD 11

== June 10 elections ==
=== House District 3 ===
2025 Florida House of Representatives District 3 special election
- June 10, 2025

Florida House of Representatives District 3
- Registered: 139,469
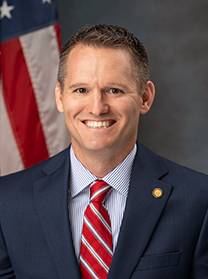

Candidate	Nathan Boyles	Dondre Markell Wise
Party	Republican	Democratic
Popular vote	8,175	4,013
Percentage	67.07%	32.93%
Representative before election
Joel Rudman
Republican
Elected Representative
Nathan Boyles
Republican

The special election in Florida's 3rd House of Representatives district took place on June 10, 2025. The primary was held on April 1, 2025. The district encompasses most of Santa Rosa County and much of northern Okaloosa County in the Florida panhandle.

==== Background ====
Registered voters as of the May 12, 2025 book closing
1. Republican (63.2%)
2. Democratic (14.4%)
3. Unaffiliated (19.2%)
4. IPF (1.93%)
5. Others (1.30%)

The special election was triggered after incumbent Republican representative Joel Rudman resigned from the House to make a run for the 2025 Florida's 1st congressional district special election, ultimately finishing a distant second in the Republican primary.

In the 2024 general election, Rudman won by 56.8 points over his Democratic opponent.

Of the district's 139,469 registered voters, 88,106 (63%) were Republicans, compared to 26,813 (19%) unaffiliated voters and just 20,044 (14%) Democrats, as of the May 12, 2025 book closing.

==== Democratic nominee ====
Dondre Markell Wise was the sole Democrat to file for the seat, so no primary was held.

==== Republican primary ====
2025 Florida House of Representatives District 3 special Republican primary April 1, 2025
Party	Candidate	Votes	%
Republican	Nathan Boyles	8,726	35.85%
Republican	Shon Owens	7,768	31.91%
Republican	Hayden Hudson	2,562	10.53%
Republican	Cynthia Smith	2,099	8.63%
Republican	Wade Merritt	1,549	6.36%
Republican	Jamie Wells	931	3.82%
Republican	Rena McQuaig	411	1.69%
Republican	Joshua Shane Sik	294	1.21%
Total votes		24,340	100.00%
Turnout		24,340	27.60%
Registered electors (Republican)		88,185	

==== General election ====
2025 Florida House of Representatives District 3 special election June 10, 2025
Party	Candidate	Votes	%
Republican	Nathan Boyles	8,176	67.05%
Democratic	Dondre Markell Wise	4,017	32.95%
Total votes		12,193	100%
Registered electors		139,469	

=== House District 32 ===
2025 Florida House of Representatives District 32 special election
- June 10, 2025

Florida House of Representatives District 32
- Registered: 139,469
- Turnout: 19.4%
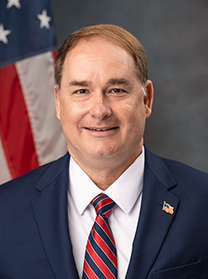

Candidate	Brian Hodgers	Juan Hinojosa
Party	Republican	Democratic
Popular vote	14,997	12,111
Percentage	55.37%	44.63%
Representative before election
Debbie Mayfield
Republican
Elected Representative
Brian Hodgers
Republican

The special election in Florida's 32nd House of Representatives district took place on June 10, 2025. The primary was held on April 1, 2025. The district encompasses a portion of Brevard County in eastern Central Florida.

==== Background ====
Registered voters as of the May 12, 2025 book closing
1. Republican (46.9%)
2. Democratic (24.4%)
3. Unaffiliated (25.1%)
4. IPF (2.72%)
5. Others (0.91%)

The special election was triggered after Republican incumbent Debbie Mayfield announced her resignation to run for a special election in Senate District 19 to succeed Randy Fine.

In the 2024 general election, Mayfield won by 28.6 points over her Democratic opponent.

Of the district's 137,774 registered voters, 64,597 (47%) were Republicans, compared to 34,596 (25%) unaffiliated voters and 33,569 (24%) Democrats, as of the May 12, 2025 book closing.

==== Democratic nominee ====
Juan Hinojosa was the sole Democrat to file for the seat, so no primary was held. He was the Democratic nominee for this district in 2024.

==== Republican primary ====
2025 Florida House of Representatives District 32 special Republican primary April 1, 2025
Party	Candidate	Votes	%
Republican	Brian Hodgers	5,642	35.01%
Republican	Bob White	5,333	33.10%
Republican	Terrence Cronin	5,138	31.89%
Total votes		16,113	100.00%
Turnout		16,113	24.96%
Registered electors (Republican)		64,553	

==== General election ====
2025 Florida House of Representatives District 32 special election June 10, 2025
Party	Candidate	Votes	%
Republican	Brian Hodgers	14,999	55.30%
Democratic	Juan Hinojosa	12,122	44.70%
Total votes		27,121	100%
Registered electors		137,774	

=== Senate District 19 ===
2025 Florida Senate District 19 special election
- June 10, 2025

Florida Senate District 19
- Registered: 401,336
- Turnout: 17.1%
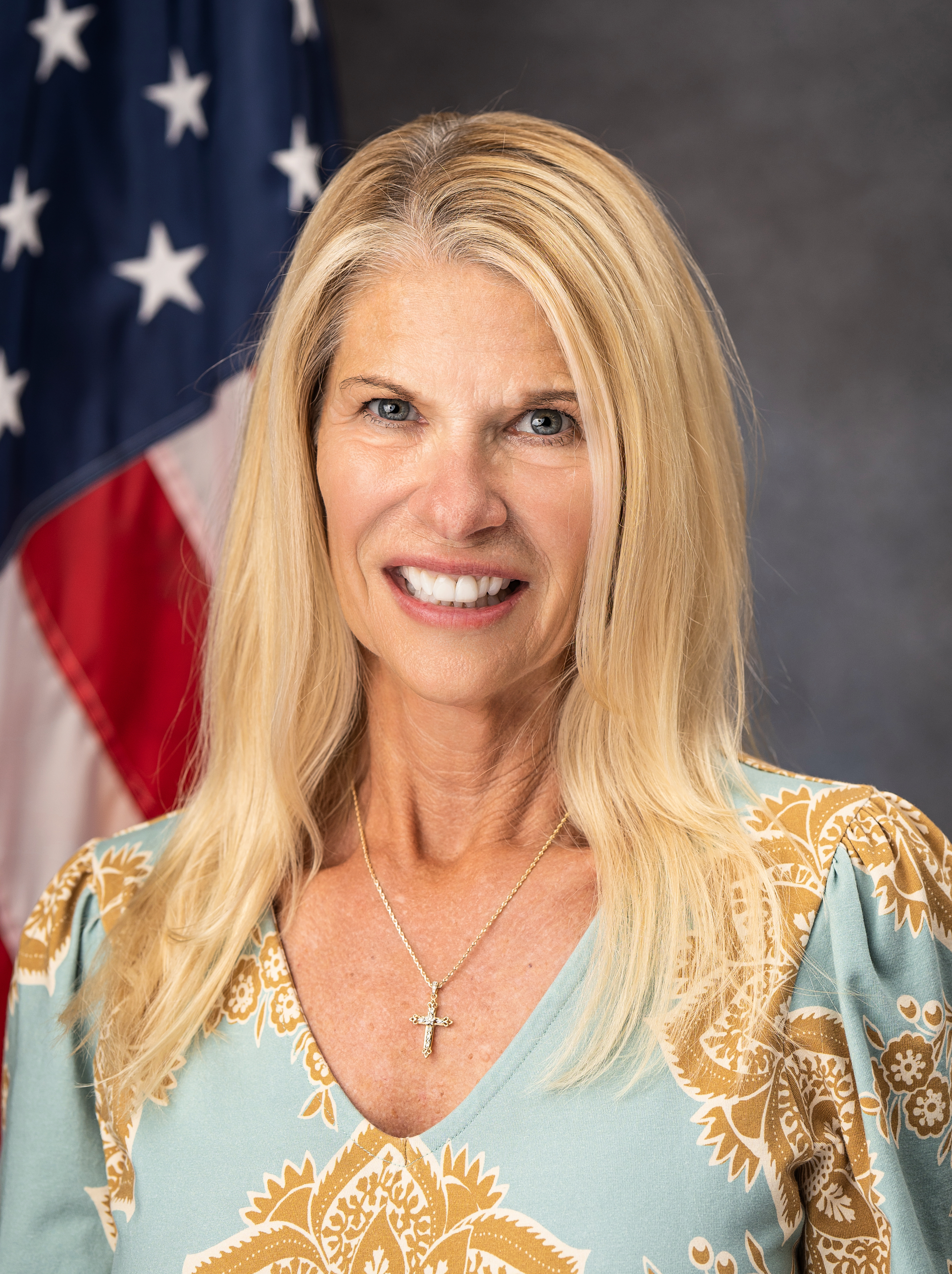

Candidate	Debbie Mayfield	Vance Ahrens
Party	Republican	Democratic
Popular vote	37,546	31,419
Percentage	54.45%	45.55%
Senator before election
Randy Fine
Republican
Elected Senator
Debbie Mayfield
Republican

The special election in Florida's 19th Senate district took place on June 10, 2025. The primary was held on April 1, 2025. The district encompasses much of Brevard County in eastern Central Florida.

==== Background ====
Registered voters as of the May 12, 2025 book closing
1. Republican (44.9%)
2. Democratic (25.9%)
3. Unaffiliated (25.5%)
4. IPF (2.65%)
5. Others (1.02%)

This election was triggered after Republican incumbent Randy Fine resigned to successfully run in the 2025 Florida's 6th congressional district special election.

In the 2024 general election, Fine won by 18.72 points over his Democratic opponent.

Of the district's 401,336 registered voters, 180,188 (45%) were Republicans, compared to 103,976 (24%) Democrats and 102,414 (26%) unaffiliated voters, as of the May 12, 2025 book closing.

==== Democratic nominee ====
Vance Ahrens was the sole Democrat to file for the seat, so no primary was held. She was the Democratic nominee for this district in 2024.

==== Republican primary ====
State representative Debbie Mayfield, Fine's direct predecessor in this district, resigned from the house of representatives to run for the seat, but was disqualified from the race. She filed a lawsuit directly with the Florida Supreme Court, which unanimously ruled in her favor.

Debate

2025 Florida's 19th Senate district special election republican primary debate
No.	Date	Host	Moderator	Link	Republican	Republican	Republican	Republican
Key: P Participant A Absent N Not invited I Invited W Withdrawn								
Key: P Participant A Absent N Not invited I Invited W Withdrawn					Adkins	Lightner	Mayfield	Thomas
1	Mar. 13, 2025	Florida Today	John Torres	YouTube	P	P	A	P

2025 Florida Senate District 19 special Republican primary April 1, 2025
Party	Candidate	Votes	%
Republican	Debbie Mayfield	23,637	60.81%
Republican	Mark Lightner III	6,264	16.12%
Republican	Tim Thomas	5,183	13.33%
Republican	Marcelle Adkins	3,786	9.74%
Total votes		38,870	100.00%
Turnout		38,870	21.61%
Registered electors (Republican)		179,851	

==== General election ====
2025 Florida Senate District 19 special election June 10, 2025
Party	Candidate	Votes	%
Republican	Debbie Mayfield	37,557	54.43%
Democratic	Vance Ahrens	31,446	45.57%
Total votes		69,003	100%
Registered electors		401,336	

== September 2 elections ==
=== House District 40 ===
2025 Florida House of Representatives District 40 special election
- September 2, 2025

Florida House of Representatives District 40
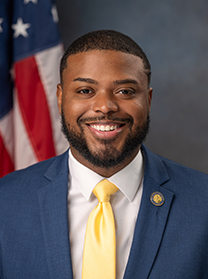

Candidate	RaShon Young	Tuan Le
Party	Democratic	Republican
Popular vote	7,330	2,435
Percentage	75.06%	24.94%
Representative before election
LaVon Bracy Davis
Democratic
Elected Representative
RaShon Young
Democratic

The special election in Florida's 40th House of Representatives district took place on September 2, 2025. The primary was held on June 24, 2025. The district encompasses a portion of Orange County.

==== Background ====
The special election was triggered after democratic incumbent LaVon Bracy Davis announced her resignation to run for a special election in Senate District 15 (see below) to succeed Geraldine Thompson, who died on February 13, 2025. RaShon Young, an aide to Bracy Davis, was declared the winner over former state representative Travaris McCurdy after polls closed.

In the 2024 general election, Bracy Davis won by 35 points over her Republican opponent.

==== Democratic primary ====
===== Candidates =====
- Travaris McCurdy, former state representative from the 46th district (2020–2022)
- RaShon Young, aide to incumbent state representative LaVon Bracy Davis

===== Endorsements =====
Travaris McCurdy

Newspapers and publication

- The Orlando Sentinel
Rashon Young

State legislators

- LaVon Bracy Davis, incumbent state representative

===== Results =====
2025 Florida House of Representatives District 40 special Democratic primary June 24, 2025
Party	Candidate	Votes	%
Democratic	RaShon Young	2,794	55.44%
Democratic	Travaris McCurdy	2,246	44.56%
Turnout		5,040	100.00%

==== Republican nominee ====
Tuan Le was the only Republican candidate to file, so the primary election was cancelled.

==== General election ====
2025 Florida House of Representatives District 40 special election September 2, 2025
Party	Candidate	Votes	%
Democratic	RaShon Young	7,330	75.06%
Republican	Tuan Le	2,435	24.94%
Total votes		9,765	100%
Registered electors			

=== Senate District 15 ===
2025 Florida Senate District 15 special election
- September 2, 2025

Florida Senate District 15
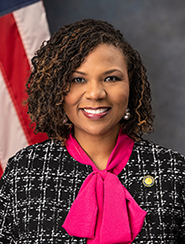

Candidate	LaVon Bracy Davis	Willie Montague
Party	Democratic	Republican
Popular vote	17,771	6,713
Percentage	72.58%	27.42%
Senator before election
Geraldine Thompson
Democratic
Elected Senator
LaVon Bracy Davis
Democratic

The special election in Florida's 15th Senate district took place on September 2, 2025. The primary was held on June 24, 2025. The district encompasses much of Orange County.

==== Background ====
This election was triggered after Democratic incumbent Geraldine Thompson died on February 13, 2025. In the 2024 general election, Thompson won uncontested.

The primary election drew international media coverage due to Randolph Bracy and LaVon Bracy Davis, who are siblings, running against each other and their mother endorsing the latter sibling. Bracy Davis was declared the winner soon after polls closed.

==== Democratic primary ====
===== Candidates =====
- Coretta Anthony-Smith, personal injury attorney
- Randolph Bracy, former state senator from the 11th district (2016–2022) and brother of LaVon Bracy Davis
- LaVon Bracy Davis, state representative from the 40th district (2022–present) and sister of Randolph Bracy
- Alan Grayson, former U.S. Representative (2009–2011; 2013–2017)

===== Endorsements =====
LaVon Bracy Davis

Newspapers and publication

- The Orlando Sentinel

===== Results =====
2025 Florida Senate District 15 special Democratic primary June 24, 2025
Party	Candidate	Votes	%
Democratic	LaVon Bracy Davis	5,533	42.96
Democratic	Coretta Anthony-Smith	3,646	28.31
Democratic	Alan Grayson	2,153	16.72
Democratic	Randolph Bracy	2,153	12.02
Turnout		12,880	100.00

==== Republican nominee ====
Willie Montague was the sole Republican to file for the seat, so no primary was held.

==== General election ====
2025 Florida Senate District 15 special election September 2, 2025
Party	Candidate	Votes	%
Democratic	LaVon Bracy Davis	17,771	72.58%
Republican	Willie Montague	6,713	27.42%
Total votes		24,484	100%
Registered electors			

== December 9 elections ==
=== House District 90 ===
2025 Florida House of Representatives District 90 special election
- December 9, 2025

Florida House of Representatives District 90
Candidate	Rob Long	Maria Zack
Party	Democratic	Republican
Popular vote	9,226	5,109
Percentage	63.7%	35.3%
Representative before election
Joe Casello
Democratic
Elected Representative
Rob Long
Democratic

The special election in Florida's 90th House of Representatives district took place on December 9, 2025. Primaries were held on September 30, 2025. The district encompasses a portion of Palm Beach County.

==== Background ====
The special election was triggered after Democratic incumbent Joe Casello died of a heart attack on July 18, 2025.

In the 2024 general election, Casello won by 12.2 points over his Republican opponent.

==== Democratic primary ====
===== Candidates =====
- Rob Long, Delray Beach commissioner

==== Republican primary ====
===== Candidates =====
- Bill Reicherter, businessman, nominee for this district in 2024 and Florida's 30th Senate district in 2022
- Maria Zack, businesswoman and lobbyist

===== Results =====
2025 Florida House of Representatives District 90 special Republican primary September 30, 2025
Party	Candidate	Votes	%
Republican	Maria Zack	1,419	52.97%
Republican	Bill Reicherter	1,260	47.03%
Total votes		2,679	100.00%

==== Independents ====
- Karen Ching Hsien Yeh Ho

==== General election ====
2025 Florida House of Representatives District 90 special election December 9, 2025
Party	Candidate	Votes	%
Democratic	Rob Long	9,226	63.7%
Republican	Maria Zack	5,109	35.3%
Independent	Karen Ching Hsien Yeh Ho	140	1.0%
Total votes		14,475	100%
Registered electors			

=== Senate District 11 ===
2025 Florida Senate District 11 special election
- December 9, 2025

Florida Senate District 11
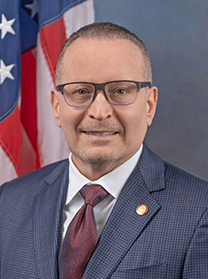

Candidate	Ralph E. Massullo Jr	Ash Marwah
Party	Republican	Democratic
Popular vote	49,088	33,803
Percentage	59.2%	40.8%
Senator before election
Blaise Ingoglia
Republican
Elected Senator
Ralph E. Massullo Jr
Republican

The special election in Florida's 11th Senate district will take place on December 9, 2025. Primaries will be held on September 30, 2025. The district consists of Citrus, Hernando, Sumter counties and part of Pasco County.

==== Background ====
This election was triggered after Republican incumbent Blaise Ingoglia resigned July 21, 2025, to become the Chief Financial Officer of Florida. In the 2024 general election, Ingoglia won by 38.58 points against his Democratic opponent.

==== Republican primary ====
===== Candidates =====
- Anthony Brice, veteran and rancher
- Ralph Massullo, former state representative from the 23rd district (2016–2024)

===== Endorsements =====
Ralph Massullo

Federal officials

- Ashley Moody, U.S. senator from Florida (2025–present)
- Rick Scott, U.S. senator from Florida (2019–present)
- Daniel Webster, U.S. representative from Florida's 11th congressional district (2011–present) (Note: Numbered as the 8th from 2011–2013 and as the 10th from 2013–2017)

Statewide officials

- Ron DeSantis, Governor of Florida (2019–present)
- Blaise Ingoglia, Chief Financial Officer of Florida (2025–present), former state senator from this district (2022–2025)
- Wilton Simpson, Florida Commissioner of Agriculture (2023–present)

State legislators

- J.J. Grow, state representative (2024–present)
- Jeff Holcomb, state representative (2022–present)
- John Temple, state representative (2022–present)

Sheriffs

- Al Nienhuis, Hernando County sheriff
- Chris Nocco, Pasco County sheriff
- Dave Vincent, Citrus County sheriff

Organizations

- Florida Chamber of Commerce

===== Results =====
2025 Florida Senate District 11 special Republican primary September 30, 2025
Party	Candidate	Votes	%
Republican	Ralph E. Massullo Jr	22,525	79.53%
Republican	Anthony V. Brice	5,799	20.47%
Total votes		28,324	100.00%

Results by County
County	Ralph E. Massullo Jr		Anthony V. Brice		Total
Citrus	7,855	78.39%	2,165	21.61%	10,020
Hernando	3,838	77.54%	1,113	22.46%	4,951
Pasco	1,085	77.22%	320	22.78%	1,405
Sumter	9,747	81.58%	2,201	18.42%	11,948

==== Democratic primary ====
===== Candidates =====
- Ash Marwah, civil engineer

==== General election ====
2025 Florida Senate District 11 special election December 9, 2025
Party	Candidate	Votes	%
Republican	Ralph E. Massullo Jr	49,088	59.2%
Democratic	Ash Marwah	33,803	40.8%
Total votes		82,891	100%
Registered electors			
