= Colleen Burton =

Republican politician (born 1958)

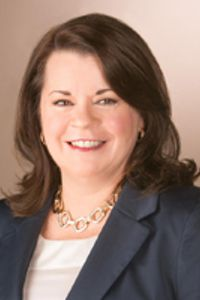

Member of the Florida Senate from the 12th district
- Incumbent
- Assumed office November 8, 2022
- Preceded by: Kelli Stargel

Member of the Florida House of Representatives from the 40th district
- In office November 4, 2014 – November 8, 2022
- Preceded by: Seth McKeel
- Succeeded by: LaVon Bracy

Personal details
- Born: April 19, 1958 (age 68) Heidelberg, West Germany
- Party: Republican
- Spouse: Jonathan Burton
- Children: 3
- Education: California State University, Sacramento (BS)

Colleen Burton (born April 19, 1958) is an American politician who served as a member of the Florida House of Representatives for the 40th district from 2014 to 2022.

== Early life and education ==
Burton was born in Heidelberg, West Germany, to a military family. She attended California State University, Sacramento, graduating with a degree in public administration in 1980.

== Career ==
After graduating from college, Burton moved to Lakeland, Florida, and began working for a number of nonprofit organizations, starting with Big Brothers Big Sisters of Polk County. Burton then took a job as the executive director of the Imperial Symphony Orchestra and then formed Polk Vision, a group of government representatives, local business leaders, and residents to chart out the future of Polk County.

Burton ran for Polk County supervisor of elections in 2012, challenging incumbent Supervisor Lori Edwards in the nonpartisan primary, and campaigned on her "ability to pull people together to work for a common cause", as she did with Polk Vision. The Ledger endorsed Edwards over Burton, though praised both as "top-notch candidates with long records of successful, high-level public service". Edwards defeated Burton with 73% of the vote.

=== Florida House of Representatives ===
In 2014, incumbent State Representative Seth McKeel was unable to seek re-election due to term limits, so Burton ran to succeed him. She faced attorney John Hugh Shannon in the Republican primary, and she was endorsed by a number of locally elected Republicans, including State Senators Kelli Stargel and Denise Grimsley. Burton campaigned on her support for cutting taxes, continuing education funding at current levels, reducing regulation, and work with local economic development groups, asking, "What can we do? What can happen in Tallahassee to enhance your position so that more companies come to Polk County?" She was attacked during the campaign by an organization supporting Shannon for being "too liberal" by developing a plan that "raised property taxes by 23 percent and utility fees by 500 percent" and for supporting assistance for undocumented immigrants, an attack that she condemned as "predictable, unethical and illegal". In the end, Burton narrowly emerged victorious over Shannon, defeating him by fewer than 200 votes and winning 51% of the vote. She advanced to the general election, where she faced Ricky Shirah, the Democratic nominee, and Ed Shoemaker, the American Independent Party nominee. During the campaign, Burton campaigned on her opposition to the expansion of Medicaid under the Patient Protection and Affordable Care Act, her opposition to changing the process by which legislative districts are drawn, and her support for education funding. Burton ended up defeating her opponents by a wide margin, winning her first term in the legislature with 55% of the vote to Shirah's 40% and Shoemaker's 5%.
