= Neil Combee =

Republican politician from Florida

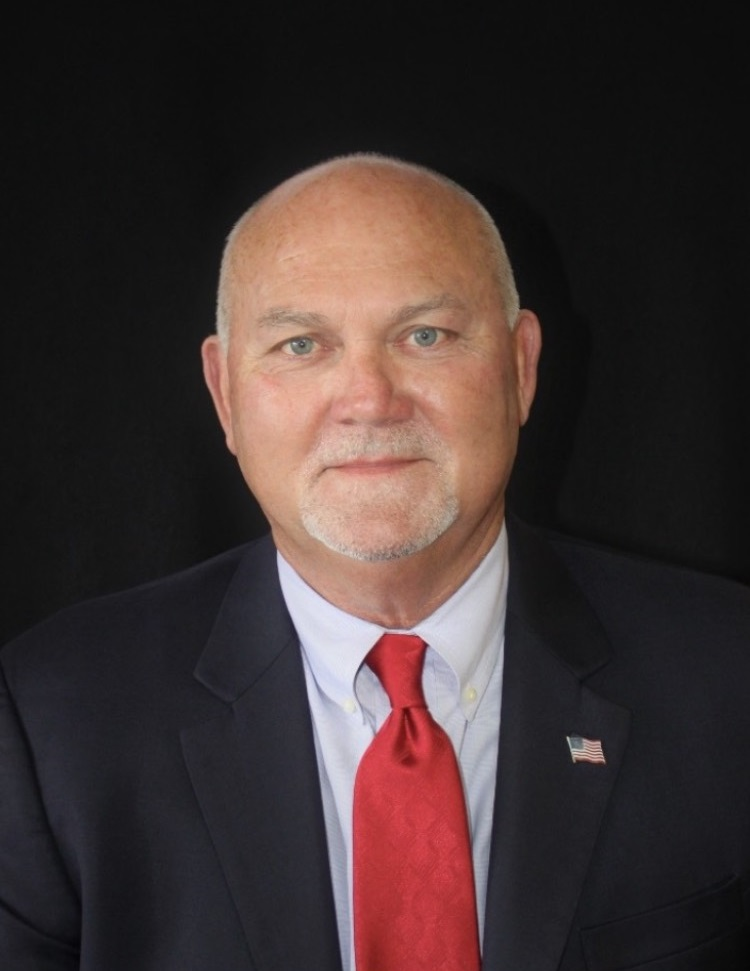

Polk County Property Appraiser
- Incumbent
- Assumed office January 7, 2025
- Preceded by: Marsha Faux

Member of the Florida House of Representatives from the 39th district district
- In office November 6, 2012 – November 24, 2017
- Preceded by: Kelli Stargel (redistricted)
- Succeeded by: Josie Tomkow

Personal details
- Born: June 12, 1959 (age 67) Lakeland, Florida, U.S.
- Party: Republican
- Education: Polk State College (AA); Florida State University (BA)
- Profession: Agribusiness, real estate

Neil Combee (born June 12, 1959) is a Republican politician from Florida who represented parts of northern Polk County and northwestern Osceola County in the Florida House of Representatives from 2012 to 2017.

== Early life and career ==
Combee was born in Lakeland. He attended Polk State College and Florida State University. He then worked in agribusiness and real estate. He is married to Linda Combee, with 2 adult sons and 5 grandchildren.

He was elected to the Polk County Commission as a Democrat in 1988, a position to which he was re-elected in 1992, 1996, and 2000. In 2004, Combee did not seek another term on the Commission, and following the conclusion of his term in 2005, he was appointed to the Governing Board of the Southwest Florida Water Management District, where he served until 2012 when he resigned to run for the legislature.

Combee was going to run for the legislature in 2010 when incumbent State Representative Kelli Stargel was planning on seeking the Florida Senate seat held by Paula Dockery, who planned on running for Governor. When Dockery dropped her gubernatorial campaign, however, Stargel instead ran for re-election, putting her on a collision course with Combee. Ultimately, Combee did not qualify for the ballot because his campaign "wrote a qualifying check for $1,781.81, but the correct amount required was $1,781.82."

== Florida House of Representatives ==
When Dockery was term-limited in 2012, Stargel ran to succeed her, creating an open seat in the 39th District, and Combee once again declared his candidacy. He was unopposed in the primary election and faced Carol Castagnero, an independent candidate who had run for a number of offices unsuccessfully, in the general election. Castagnero did not present a strong challenge to Combee, and he ended up defeating her in a landslide, receiving 65% of the vote, to win his first term in the legislature.

Combee sponsored legislation in 2013 that would have "[prevented] someone who fires a warning shot or brandishes a weapon from being prosecuted under the state's stiff gun laws," which he had previously proposed a year prior, but had not received a vote.

He attracted controversy in 2013 when he suggested on Twitter that Barack Obama was responsible for the chemical attacks that took place in the Syrian Civil War, asking, "Who knows? Did the White House Help Plan the Syrian Chemical Attack?" He defended his remarks, saying, "I think it's my place, your place and everybody's place to question what is going on here. Who do we believe?"

During his time in the legislature, Combee chaired the Oversight, Transparency & Administration Subcommittee. He also served as Vice Chair of the State Affairs Committee and Government Operations & Technology Appropriations Subcommittee.

== Later career ==
Combee resigned from the House on November 24, 2017 after being appointed by President Donald Trump to take a position as Florida state director of the USDA Farm Service Agency. He held that position until April 17, 2018, when he announced his campaign for Florida's 15th congressional district. Combee came in second in the 2018 Republican primary to Ross Spano, 44.1 to 33.8%.

In 2020, Combee was elected to the Polk County Commission after defeating incumbent John Hall. In 2024. After serving 4 years on the County Commission, he ran to succeed Marsha Faux as Polk County Property Appraiser. He faced former Lakeland Mayor Gow Fields in the Republican primary, and defeated him with 58 percent of the vote. Combee was unopposed in the general election, and took office on January 7, 2025.
