= Senator Dockery =

Senator Dockery may refer to:

- Alfred Dockery (1797–1875), North Carolina State Senate
- Paula Dockery (born 1961), Florida State Senate
