= Bruce Antone =

American politician

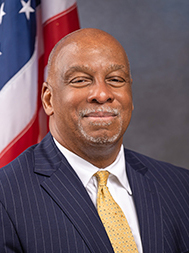

Member of the Florida House of Representatives
- Incumbent
- Assumed office November 8, 2022
- Preceded by: Travaris McCurdy
- Constituency: 41st district
- In office November 6, 2012 – November 3, 2020
- Preceded by: Redistricted
- Succeeded by: Travaris McCurdy
- Constituency: 46th district
- In office November 5, 2002 – November 7, 2006
- Preceded by: Gary Siplin
- Succeeded by: Geraldine Thompson
- Constituency: 39th district

Personal details
- Born: November 1, 1960 (age 65) Mobile, Alabama, U.S.
- Party: Democratic
- Spouse: Debra McGowan
- Children: Kaylyn
- Education: Tuskegee University (BS); University of Central Florida
- Profession: Consultant

Bruce Hadley Antone (born November 1, 1960) is an American politician from Florida. A Democrat, he served in the Florida House of Representatives from 2002 to 2006, from 2012 to 2020, and again from 2022, representing parts of Orlando in Orange County.

== Early life and career ==
Antone was born in Mobile, Alabama, and attended Tuskegee University, graduating with a degree in electrical engineering in 1983. Following graduation, he started graduate studies in electrical engineering, but moved to the state of Florida in 1984, where he pursued graduate studies in public administration at the University of Central Florida, but did not graduate.

Antone worked as a legislative aide to State Senator Buddy Dyer from 1992 to 1999, including serving as his chief of staff. He ran for a seat on the Orange County Commission from the 6th District, but received only 9% of the vote. In 2000, when incumbent State Representative Alzo Reddick did not seek re-election, Antone ran to succeed him, facing Gary Siplin, Wardell Sims, Miles Brooks, and David Rucker in the Democratic primary. He earned the endorsement of the Orlando Sentinel, which praised him as the "best equipped" candidate, but ultimately lost to Siplin and Sims, who advanced to a runoff election, winning 27% of the vote.

== Legislative career ==
=== Early 2000’s ===
When Siplin, whom Antone had lost to in 2000, decided to run for the Florida Senate rather than seek re-election, Antone ran to succeed him in the 39th District, which stretched from downtown Orlando to Pine Hills. In the Democratic primary, he faced Tiffany Moore-Russell, Geraldine Thompson, and Jon Eason, whom he defeated with 34% of the vote, and advanced to the general election, where he faced Janet Buckles, the Republican nominee. Antone emphasized that, unlike Siplin, he would focus on passing bills into law while serving in the legislature and would not waste his time on "feel-good" efforts. Antone defeated Buckles easily, winning 75% of the vote. In 2004, when he ran for re-election, he was opposed in the primary election by Tiffany Moore-Russell, once again, and Fritz Seide Jackson. Antone expanded his margin of victory from 2002, and won renomination with 52% of the vote to Moore-Russell's 39% and Jackson's 9%. He faced Thomas J. Kelly, the nominee of the British Reformed Sectarian Party, in the general election, whom he handily defeated with 90% of the vote.

=== County Commission campaign ===
Rather than seek re-election in 2006, Antone instead opted to run for a position on the Orange County Commission from the 6th District. He faced Moore-Russell, Juan Lynum, Jackson Marcelin, and Chick Fryar in the primary election, and he placed second to Moore-Russell, with 37% of the vote to her 38%, advancing to the general election. He was endorsed by the Sentinel, which praised his "sensible priorities" of increasing funding to the Lynx bus system, supporting SunRail, and fund after-school programs for children. However, he narrowly lost to Moore-Russell, winning only 47% of the vote to her 53%. He and David Rucker challenged her in 2010 when she sought re-election, but she defeated him in a landslide in the primary election, winning 61% of the vote to his 26% and Rucker's 13%.

=== Return to House ===
When legislative districts were redrawn in 2012, Geraldine Thompson opted to run for the Florida Senate rather than seek re-election in the newly created 46th District, so Antone ran to succeed her. He ran on a platform of giving the long-neglected district proper attention "in the form of job-training, education funding and services for the elderly." He emerged successful in the Democratic primary, winning 36% of the vote to Pam Powell's 29%, Sean Bradford's 15%, Rosalind Johnson's 13%, and Jason Henry's 8%. In the general election, Antone faced no opposition and he returned to the legislature uncontested.

Antone was term-limited from the House in 2020, after serving four terms.

=== 2020’s - Present ===
After defeating incumbent Travaris McCurdy in the August 2022 Democratic primary, Antone won election to the Florida House of Representatives for a third time in 2022.
