= Eric Eisnaugle =

American politician

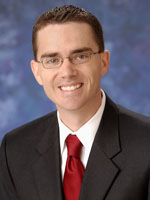

Judge of the Florida Fifth District Court of Appeal
- Incumbent
- Assumed office 2017
- Nominated by: Florida Judicial Nominating Commission
- Appointed by: Rick Scott
- Preceded by: C. Alan Lawson

Member of the Florida House of Representatives from the 44th district
- In office April 8, 2014 – May 18, 2017
- Preceded by: Steve Precourt
- Succeeded by: Bobby Olszewski

Member of the Florida House of Representatives from the 40th district
- In office November 4, 2008 – November 6, 2012
- Preceded by: Andy Gardiner
- Succeeded by: Seth McKeel

Personal details
- Born: Eric Jon Eisnaugle, Jr. February 6, 1977 (age 49) Arcadia, Florida
- Party: Republican
- Spouse: Carrie Eisnaugle
- Children: Eric III, Ethan
- Education: Florida Southern College (B.S.); Vanderbilt University (J.D.)
- Profession: Attorney

Eric Eisnaugle (born February 6, 1977) is an American politician and judge from Florida. A Republican, he has served as a judge on Florida's Fifth District Court of Appeal since 2017. Previously, he was a member of the Florida House of Representatives, representing parts of western Orange County from April 2014 until his appointment to the bench. He served a prior stint in the Florida House from 2008 to 2012.

== Early life ==
Eisnaugle was born in Arcadia, Florida on February 6, 1977. He received a Bachelor of Science degree in 2000 from Florida Southern College and a Juris Doctor from Vanderbilt University Law School in 2003. His wife, originally from Iowa, is attorney Carrie Eisnaugle, the President of Florida Right to Life.

== Florida House of Representatives ==
=== 2008-2012 ===
When incumbent State Representative Andy Gardiner was unable to seek re-election due to term limits, Eisnaugle ran to succeed him in the 40th District, which stretched from Azalea Park to Lake Butler and Hunters Creek in central Orange County. He faced Joe Mantilla in the Republican primary, whom he was able to defeat with ease, winning 68% of the vote to Mantilla's 32%. In the general election, Eisnaugle faced Todd Christian, the Democratic nominee. The Orlando Sentinel, though noting "discomfort with some of Mr. Eisnaugle's positions," endorsed him over Christian, praised him as an "engaging candidate" with "some good ideas." In the end, Eisnaugle managed to defeat Christian by a slim margin to earn his first term in the legislature, receiving 52% of the vote to Christian's 48%. Running for re-election in 2010, Eisnaugle faced Christian once again, and Tea Party movement candidate Darin Dunmire; Eisnaugle once again received the endorsement of the Sentinel, which praised him as "one of the Legislature's more thoughtful workhorses," and singled him out for bucking those in his party who wanted to abolish the State Department of Community Affairs. Once again, Eisnaugle defeated Christian, but this time by a more comfortable margin, receiving 60% of the vote to Christian's 36% and Dunmire's 4%.

In 2012, following the reconfiguration of state legislative districts, Eisnaugle was moved into the 44th District, where fellow State Representative Steve Precourt was running for re-election to his fourth and final term. With the knowledge that Precourt would be unable to run again in 2014, Eisnaugle stepped aside, and began campaigning to run as Precourt's successor.

=== 2014-2017 ===
Following his departure from the legislature, Eisnaugle joined the law offices of Rumberger, Kirk and Caldwell, practicing commercial litigation and appellate law. With an eye on running for the legislature in the 44th District in 2014, Eisnaugle continued his fundraising and campaigning efforts, predicting that his "conservative message" about reducing the size of government and cutting taxes would resonate with the voters.

In 2014, when Precourt resigned to accept a job with the Orlando–Orange County Expressway Authority, a special election was held and Eisnaugle ran to succeed him. In the Republican primary, he defeated former Orange County School Board Member Vicky Bell with 85% of the vote and advanced to the general election, where he faced Shaun Raja, a businessman and the Democratic nominee. Owing to the conservative nature of the district, Eisnaugle defeated Raja in a landslide, winning his return to the legislature with 74% of the vote.

Even before he returned to the legislature, Eisnaugle donated tens of thousands of dollars to fellow Republicans running for the legislature, with the implicit aim of lining up supporters for his bid for the Speakership of the Florida House of Representatives for the 2020-2022 legislative session. Former Lieutenant Governor Toni Jennings criticized Eisnaugle's plan, noting that he was getting ahead of himself and declaring, "Talk about the tail wagging the dog. This tail is so far ahead of itself, it can't even see the dog anymore."

Eisnaugle won reelection to his seat in the 2014 elections, defeating Independent Matthew Falconer. He was subsequently re-elected unopposed in 2016.

== Fifth District Court of Appeal ==
After Judge C. Alan Lawson was appointed by Governor Rick Scott to the Florida Supreme Court, Eisnaugle applied for Lawson's vacant seat on the Fifth District Court of Appeal. He was one of six finalists forwarded by the Judicial Nominating Commission to Scott, and on May 8, 2017, Scott appointed him to the court.
