= Travaris McCurdy =

Florida politician

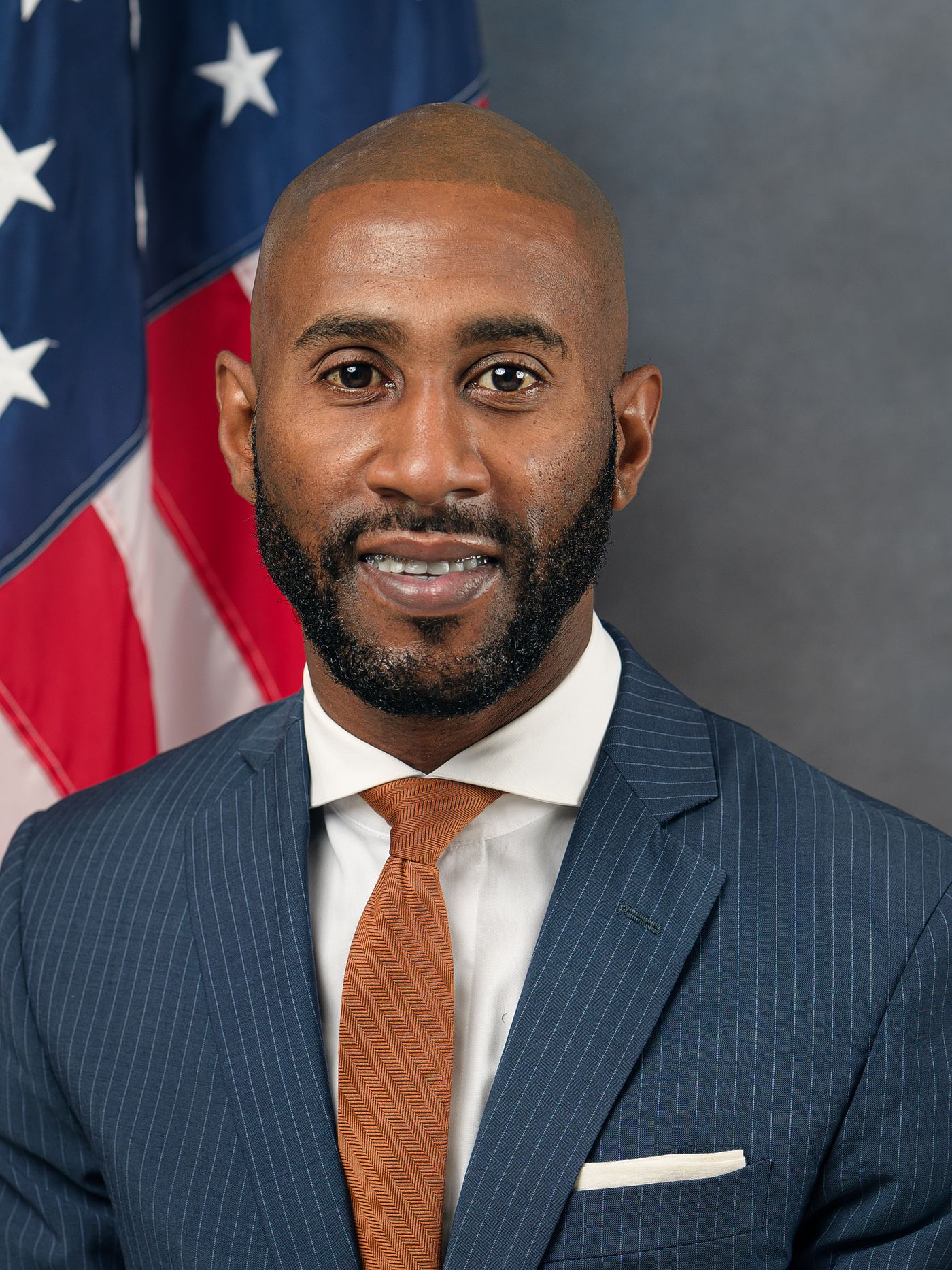

Member of the Florida House of Representatives from the 46th district
- In office November 3, 2020 – November 8, 2022
- Preceded by: Bruce Antone
- Succeeded by: Bruce Antone

Personal details
- Born: March 1, 1984 (age 42) Orlando, Florida, U.S.
- Party: Democratic
- Children: 1
- Education: Florida A&M University (BA)

Travaris Leon McCurdy (born March 1, 1984) is an American politician and former member of the Florida House of Representatives from the 46th district.

== Early life and education ==
McCurdy was born in Orlando, Florida. He earned a Bachelor of Arts degree in political science from Florida A&M University.

== Career ==
In 2014 and 2015, McCurdy worked as the deputy political director for the For Our Future PAC. He also worked as a legislative aide for State Senator Randolph Bracy and State Rep Geraldine Thompson. McCurdy was elected to the Florida House of Representatives and assumed office on November 3, 2020.

On April 21, 2022, McCurdy attempted to stage a sit-in demonstration to prevent a vote on Florida's congressional district maps. Opponents of the tactic compared his actions to an insurrection. The demonstration was ultimately unsuccessful.

On August 23, 2022, McCurdy lost his bid for reelection to the Florida House. McCurdy lost in the Democratic primary to former Representative Bruce Antone, garnering less than 29% of the vote.
