= Precourt =

Precourt is a surname. Notable people with the surname include:

- Anthony Precourt (born c. 1969–70), American sports team owner
- Charles J. Precourt (born 1955), American astronaut
- Steve Precourt (born 1960), American politician
