= Elizabeth Coleman (disambiguation) =

Elizabeth Coleman is president of Bennington College.

Elizabeth Coleman may also refer to:

- Elizabeth A. Coleman, inspector general of the Federal Reserve Board
- Bessie Coleman (1892–1926), aviator
- One Life to Live miscellaneous characters#Liz Coleman Reynolds
- Betty Coleman, The Walking Dead character
