= Florida's 41st House of Representatives district =

Florida district

Florida's 41st State House of Representatives district
Representative
Bruce Antone; D–Orlando

Florida's 41st House of Representatives district elects one member of the Florida House of Representatives. It covers parts of Orange County.

== Members ==
- Bruce Antone (since 2022)
