= RaShon Young =

American politician (born 1999)

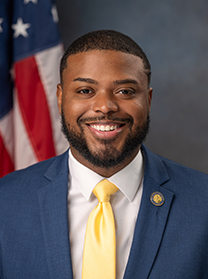

Member of the Florida House of Representatives from the 40th district
- Incumbent
- Assumed office September 2, 2025
- Preceded by: LaVon Bracy Davis

Personal details
- Born: June 22, 1999 (age 27) Charlotte, North Carolina, U.S.
- Party: Democratic
- Education: Bethune-Cookman University (B.A.)

RaShon Young (born June 22, 1999) is an American politician who is currently serving as a Democratic member of the Florida House of Representatives, representing the 40th district. He was elected in a special election on September 2, 2025, to succeed incumbent LaVon Bracy Davis, who ran for state senate in a concurrent special election.

The district is based in northern Orange County and includes the communities of Pine Hills, Lockhart, and portions of Fairview Shores. Young became the first Generation Z Democrat to be elected to the Florida Legislature after his win.

== Personal life and career ==
Young was born on June 22, 1999, in Charlotte, North Carolina. He graduated from Bethune-Cookman University with a Bachelor of Arts degree in communications. He worked as an engineer for NASA and as a chief of staff to representative LaVon Bracy Davis. He attends the African Methodist Episcopal Church.
