= Bobby Olszewski =

American politician (born 1977)

Robert "Bobby O" Olszewski
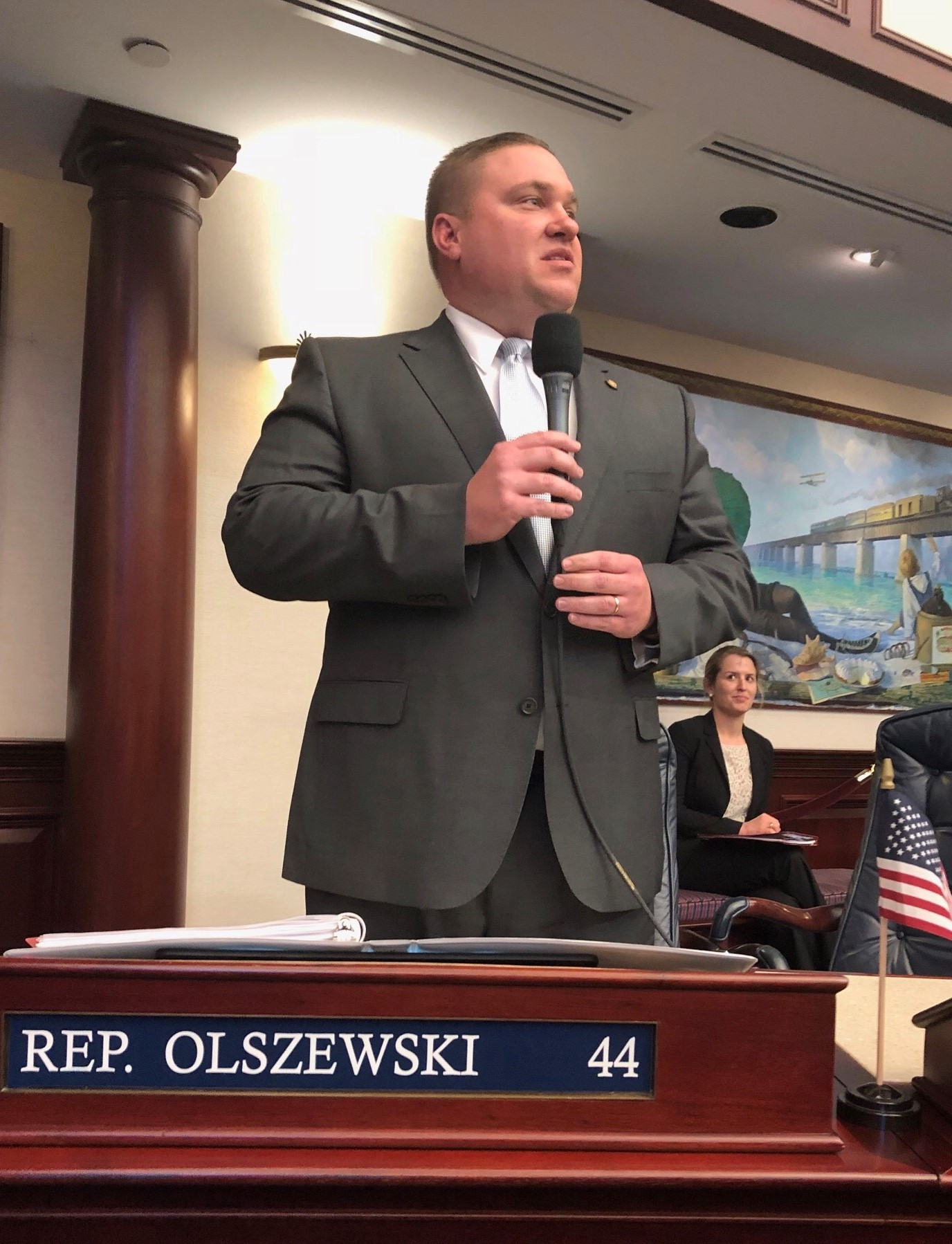

Member of the Florida House of Representatives from the 44th district
- In office October 10, 2017 – November 6, 2018
- Preceded by: Eric Eisnaugle
- Succeeded by: Geraldine Thompson

Personal details
- Born: September 6, 1977 (age 49) Cleveland, Ohio
- Party: Republican
- Spouse: Allison
- Children: Reagan
- Education: University of Central Florida (B.A.); Rollins College (M.A.); Embry-Riddle Aeronautical University (M.S.); Northcentral University (Ph.D.)
- Profession: Management Consultant

Robert "Bobby O" Olszewski (born September 6, 1977) is an author and former American politician who previously served as a member of the Florida House of Representatives, representing the 44th District which included Windermere, Winter Garden, Gotha, Lake Buena Vista, Oakland, parts of Ocoee, and the Dr. Phillips, Horizon West, and Williamsburg communities in West Orange County. The district contained Walt Disney World, Universal Studios Florida, SeaWorld, International Drive, and the Orange County Convention Center.

== Author ==
Bobby Olszewski is the author of Grand Slam Leadership: Using Baseball Principles and Strategies to Win in Business and Life. Grand Slam Leadership was featured nationally in Florida Politics. Legends On Deck, Insider Weekly, and Business Life. Olszewski has also published the book Donor Motivations: Why People Give and How Fundraisers Can Earn Their Support. A feature story was run in the West Orange Times & Observer featuring his books and service to the community. Bobby was also the inaugural guest in the first episode of the Beyond the Bell podcast produced by Orange County Public Schools, in addition to appearing on the Legends On Deck podcast.

== Education ==
After graduating from Dr. Phillips High School in Orlando, Olszewski earned an undergraduate double major from the University of Central Florida in Radio/Television (B.A.) and Organizational Communication (B.A.), as well as two master’s degrees in Management (M.S.) from Embry-Riddle Aeronautical University, and Corporate Communication & Technology (M.A.) from Rollins College. Olszewski also earned a Ph.D. in Business Administration from Northcentral University. Olszewski's published doctoral dissertation Donor Motivations for Donating to a Nonprofit Without a Previous Relationship, which was cited by multiple peer-reviewed research sources, conducted a quantitative analysis of surveyed donors from the Basilica of Mary, Queen of the Universe in the Diocese of Orlando.

== Professional ==
Since 2026, Olszewski has served as the State Leader for Florida Government and Community Partnerships for STV, Inc., a national transportation, infrastructure, transit, energy, and water engineering firm. Prior to joining STV, Olszewski was the Vice President of Government and Community Relations with Global-5 working with clients including FDOT and USDOT, the managing principal of Emerson Management & Consulting Group, Inc. and was president of Florida Laboratories in Orlando. Additionally he served as the Orange County Community Action Agency Board Chairman and Chairman of the Roper YMCA Board of Directors with the YMCA of Central Florida. For over a decade, Olszewski served as the national spokesperson and media relations chair for the Butkus Award presented by the Downtown Athletic Club of Orlando, Inc. named in honor of Pro Football Hall of Fame and College Football Hall of Fame member Dick Butkus. He also served as a sports agent representing PGA Tour golfers including two-time U.S. Open Champion Lee Janzen as well as motocross and supercross athletes including X Games gold medal winner and AMA SX/MX Champion Ricky Carmichael. He additionally worked with Florida Citrus Sports, the presenters of the Citrus Bowl game, and the Ginn Open, an LPGA Tour event, as well as creating sports marketing coursework for the University of California Irvine. He is the former Corporate Partnership Consultant for Special Olympics Florida. Olszewski additionally served as a television analyst for Spectrum News 13 and WFTV ABC 9 in Orlando, the nation's 15th largest media market. Since 2023, Olszewski has been a senior strategic advisor with the Orlando Dreamers expansion of Major League Baseball efforts to acquire a Major League Baseball team for Orlando. He was appointed by the Orange County Commission to serve on the 2025 Mid-Decennial Redistricting Advisory Committee, which drew new district lines after voters approved Charter Amendment 6 to expand the county’s districts from six to eight.

== Winter Garden Commission ==
Olszewski became a City Commissioner in Winter Garden, first elected with 71 percent of the vote and ran unopposed for his second term. Commissioner Olszewski helped save a 1-year-old beagle puppy named Rufus from being euthanized and helped bring baseball to Winter Garden with the Winter Garden Squeeze of the Florida Collegiate Summer League. Olszewski was the only Winter Garden Commissioner to vote against removing prayer from the commission meetings stating his vote was “the most indicative of defending the Constitution.” When Major League Baseball's Houston Astros and Washington Nationals were looking to leave their respective Spring Training homes in the Florida Grapefruit League, Commissioner Olszewski reached out to both organizations about moving their Spring Training to Winter Garden. The Astros came for a tour of Winter Garden but decided on moving to West Palm Beach in the shared Cacti Park of the Palm Beaches with the Nationals. Commissioner Olszewski served on the West Orange Chamber of Commerce board of directors and was a graduate of their Leadership West Orange program. He additionally is a graduate of the Orange County Public Schools Leadership Orange program as well as the Orlando Economic Partnership Political Leadership Institute. The University of Central Florida Alumni Association highlighted his service as a Winter Garden Commissioner. Olszewski was runner-up for the Orange County Commission race in District 1 where he was endorsed by Major League Baseball All-Star and World Series Champion Johnny Damon and Joey Fatone of N Sync.

== Florida House of Representatives ==
After Eric Eisnaugle was appointed by Governor Rick Scott to serve as a judge on Florida's Fifth District Court of Appeal, Olszewski won the Republican primary in the special election. In the general election, he won with 56 percent of the vote. Rep. Bobby Olszewski sent a letter to Big 12 Commissioner Bob Bowlsby lobbying the Big 12 Conference to add the University of Central Florida (UCF) and the University of South Florida (USF). Media throughout the Orlando and Tampa Bay markets supported Olszewski's efforts advocating for the UCF Knights and USF Bulls. Representative Olszewski passed HB 487 in the Florida House, which was included in a larger committee bill passing in the Florida Senate, allowing child sex-trafficking survivors to receive specialized care at hospitals and residential treatment centers throughout the state. Rep. Olszewski additionally passed two bills in the Florida House to allow lost or abandoned personal property at theme parks or entertainment complexes to be donated directly to a charity or nonprofit and a bill that would require pet owners to do all they can to shelter their animal companions in the event of a hurricane or declared emergency. Representative Olszewski was presented awards for his legislative achievements from organizations including the Florida Chamber of Commerce, the Florida League of Cities, and the Florida Alliance for Consumer Protection, the latter earning him praise from the Orlando Sentinel. Olszewski ran for reelection to the House, being challenged by former state senator Geraldine Thompson. Thompson went on to defeat Olszewski in the general election by 1%.

== See also ==
- Florida House of Representatives
