= Alan Grayson =

American politician (born 1958)

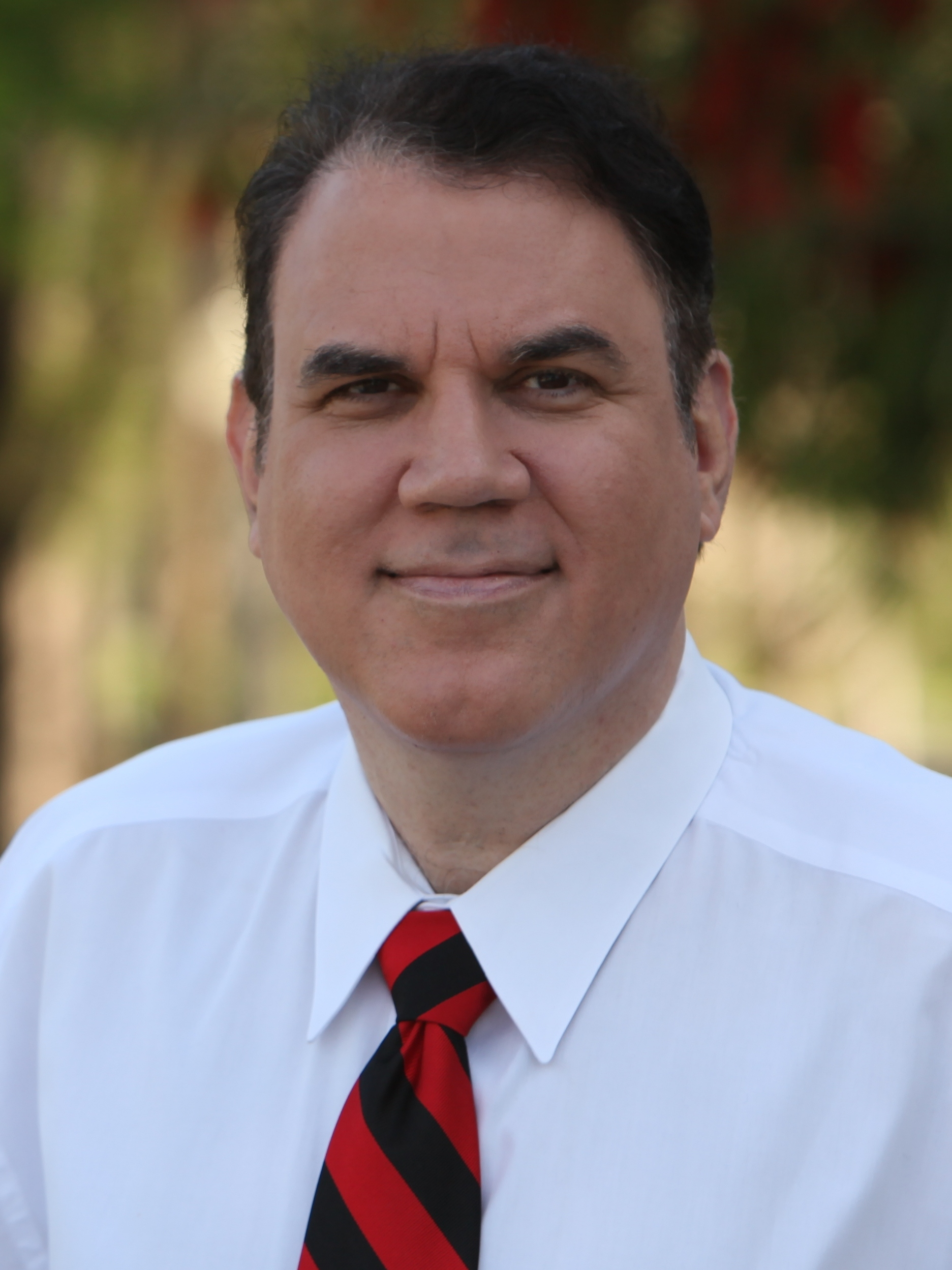
- Grayson in 2012

Member of the U.S. House of Representatives from Florida
- In office January 3, 2013 – January 3, 2017
- Preceded by: Bill Posey (redistricting)
- Succeeded by: Darren Soto
- Constituency: 9th district
- In office January 3, 2009 – January 3, 2011
- Preceded by: Ric Keller
- Succeeded by: Daniel Webster
- Constituency: 8th district

Personal details
- Born: Alan Mark Grayson; March 13, 1958 (age 68) New York City, New York, U.S.
- Party: Democratic
- Spouses: Lolita Grayson (m. 1990; div. 2015); Dena Minning (m. 2016)
- Children: 5
- Education: Harvard University (BA, MPP, JD)
- Website: Campaign website

Alan Mark Grayson (born March 13, 1958) is an American politician who served as the U.S. representative for Florida's 8th congressional district from 2009 to 2011 and Florida's 9th congressional district from 2013 to 2017. A member of the Democratic Party, he was defeated for reelection in 2010 by Republican Daniel Webster; he was then reelected in 2012 for a second, non-consecutive term in the U.S. House of Representatives in another district, defeating Republican Todd Long.

In 2016, Grayson decided not to run for reelection to his House seat in order to run for the U.S. Senate. He was defeated 59–18% in the Democratic primary by fellow Representative Patrick Murphy, who went on to lose the general election to incumbent Republican Marco Rubio. In 2018, Grayson entered the race for the 9th congressional district. He was defeated in the Democratic primary by his successor Darren Soto, 66–34%. On March 27, 2021, Grayson announced his candidacy for the 2022 U.S. Senate election in Florida to challenge Rubio. On June 14, 2022, Grayson announced that he would drop his bid for Senate and instead run in the open race for Florida's 10th congressional district, in which he lost the Democratic primary. In 2024, he unsuccessfully ran for the Florida Senate, finishing third in the primary. Grayson ran in the 2025 Florida Senate special election, He filed to run in the 2026 United States Senate special election in Florida., but after failing to qualify for the ballot instead ran in 2026 election for Florida's 7th congressional district.

== Early life and education ==
Grayson was born in the Bronx, New York City, New York, to Dorothy Ann (née Sabin) and Daniel Franklin Grayson (né Gurchinsky). He grew up in Adee Towers, a building financed by the Mitchell–Lama Housing Program, and graduated from the Bronx High School of Science in 1975. Grayson worked his way through Harvard College as a janitor and nightwatchman, and also features reporter for the Boston Phoenix. He graduated magna cum laude and Phi Beta Kappa with a Bachelor of Arts degree with a Special Concentration in Urban Studies in 1978. After working two years as an economist, he returned to Harvard for graduate studies. In 1983, he earned a J.D. cum laude from Harvard Law School and a M.P.P. from the John F. Kennedy School of Government. He also completed all coursework and the comprehensive examination for a Ph.D. in government.

Grayson wrote his master's thesis on gerontology. In 1986, he helped found the non-profit Alliance for Aging Research in Washington, D.C., and served as an officer of the organization for more than twenty years.

Alan Grayson is Jewish.

== Legal career ==
Grayson worked as a law clerk at the Colorado Supreme Court in 1983, and at the U.S. Court of Appeals for the D.C. Circuit from 1984 to 1985, where he worked with two judges who later joined the U.S. Supreme Court: Ruth Bader Ginsburg and Antonin Scalia. He was an associate in the Washington, D.C., office of the law firm Fried, Frank, Harris, Shriver & Jacobson for five years, where he specialized in contract law.

In 1991 he founded the law firm Grayson & Kubli, which concentrated on government contract law. He was a lecturer at the George Washington University government contracts program and a frequent speaker on the topic. In the 2000s, he worked as a plaintiffs' attorney specializing in whistleblower fraud cases aimed at Iraq War contractors. One contractor, Custer Battles, employed individuals who were found guilty of making fraudulent statements and submitting fraudulent invoices on two contracts the company had with the Coalition Provisional Authority in Iraq. On behalf of his clients, Grayson filed suit under the False Claims Act and its qui tam provisions. The jury verdict was more than $13 million, which was upheld on appeal in April 2009. The Iraq War contractor fraud case brought Grayson his first national attention. In 2006, a reporter for The Wall Street Journal described Grayson as "waging a one-man war against contractor fraud in Iraq" and as a "fierce critic of the war in Iraq" whose car displayed bumper stickers such as "Bush lied, people died."

== President of IDT Corp. ==
Grayson made his fortune as the co-founder and first president of IDT Corporation (International Discount Telecom).

== U.S. House of Representatives ==
=== Elections ===
==== 2006 ====
In 2006, Grayson first entered into electoral politics, losing the 2006 Democratic primary for Florida's 8th congressional district to Charlie Stuart, a prominent local businessman and conservative Democrat. Stuart went on to lose the general election to incumbent Republican Ric Keller.

==== 2008 ====
In late 2007, Grayson announced that he would run again for the 8th district seat, and again faced Stuart in the primary. In the August 26, 2008 Democratic primary, Grayson defeated Stuart, 49–28%, with three other candidates splitting the remaining 24%. During the general election campaign, Grayson maintained a consistent lead over Keller, who had only slightly won renomination in the Republican primary over attorney Todd Long. On election day, Grayson defeated Keller, 52–48%.

==== 2010 ====
Grayson was challenged by Republican nominee Daniel Webster, Florida Tea Party backed Peg Dunmire, independent George Metcalfe, and write-in Florida Whig Party candidate Steve Gerritzen.

Grayson ran a September 2010 commercial calling Webster a "draft-dodger" (Webster had received student deferments and a draft classification as medically unfit for service), and a later 30-second commercial calling Webster "Taliban Dan" and warning viewers that "Religious fanatics try to take away our freedom, in Afghanistan, in Iran and right here in Central Florida." Grayson's ads were criticized for editing video mid-sentence to make Webster appear to say things he did not. Grayson released a toned-down version without the edited video or Taliban references in early October.

On Glenn Beck's radio show, Sarah Palin agreed with a co-host's remark, "It's okay if the Republicans lose every seat in the Senate and the House except for one. As long as that one is Alan Grayson losing." Conservative Newsweek columnist George Will called Grayson "America's worst politician". Grayson was also heavily targeted in attack ads funded by groups such as the U.S. Chamber of Commerce and the 60 Plus Association.

Grayson was endorsed by 8th district resident and former Congresswoman Patricia Schroeder (D-CO), who characterized Webster as having "13th-century views" on women's issues. Former DNC Chair and Vermont governor Howard Dean called Grayson a "healthcare hero". Grayson received more votes for "progressive hero" from Democracy for America than any other candidate in the country.

On election day, Webster defeated Grayson, 56–38%.

==== 2012 ====
On July 11, 2011, Grayson announced in an e-mail to supporters that he planned to run once again for Congress. Grayson ran unopposed in the Democratic primary for the newly created 9th District in Central Florida.

On November 6, 2012, Grayson defeated Todd Long, 63–37%, to return to Congress after a one-term absence. He described his victory as "the biggest comeback in the history of the U.S. House of Representatives." Although he ran in two different districts, Grayson claimed the House historian had told him that the shift from a 56–38% loss in 2010 to a 63–37% victory in 2012 was the biggest comeback in congressional history.

==== 2014 ====
Grayson was challenged in the Democratic primary by Nick Ruiz, a professor from the University of Central Florida. He overcame this challenge comfortably, 74–26%.

The Republican challenger in the general election was Carol Platt, with independent Marko Milakovich also standing. Grayson was returned to Congress with 54% of the vote.

=== Tenure ===
==== 2009–2011 ====
Grayson was the second Democrat to represent Florida's 8th congressional district since its formation after the 1970 census (it was the 5th District from 1973 to 1993 and has been the 8th since 1993). The only other Democrat to represent this district, Bill Gunter, left to run for the United States Senate in 1974 after only one term.

Grayson is considered a progressive Democrat. He supported Barack Obama in 2008. He was a member of the Congressional Progressive Caucus, of which he was vice-chairman. Grayson twice joined Republicans to oppose the raising of the federal debt limit. He said, "We need to live within our means. We need to eliminate wasteful spending. If we did those two simple things, we would not need to raise the debt limit."

On September 14, 2009, the U.S. House of Representatives passed Grayson's Teach the Constitution Week resolution, H.RES 686, urging high schools to spend one week each September teaching the United States Constitution to high school seniors and encouraging students to petition the government on an issue of personal importance to them to demonstrate their understanding of their rights and responsibilities as citizens of the United States. The non-partisan resolution was passed by a voice vote and featured 222 co-sponsors.

On the 40th anniversary of the historic 1969 Apollo 11 Moon landing, the U.S. House of Representatives passed Grayson's New Frontier Congressional Gold Medal Act of 2009. The bill asked the president to present Congress's highest civilian honor, the Congressional Gold Medal, to Apollo 11 astronauts Neil Armstrong, Edwin "Buzz" Aldrin Jr., and Michael Collins, as well as John Glenn, the first American to orbit the Earth. Only about 200 medals have ever been awarded in the country's history. The New Frontier Congressional Gold Medal Act of 2009 passed the House unanimously on July 20, 2009.

Select legislation sponsored

- Pay for Performance Act (H.R. 1664)
- Public Option Act (H.R. 4789)
- War Is Making You Poor Act (H.R. 5353)
- Shareholder Protection Act (H.R. 4790)
- Paid Vacation Act of 2009 (H.R. 2564)

==== 2013–2017 ====
Known in his first term for making incendiary comments about Republicans, Grayson began to tone down his rhetoric and focused on working with Republicans to pass amendments that "appeal to the libertarian streak in the GOP". He lobbied colleagues personally and in July 2013, David Weigel of Slate magazine called him "the most effective member of the House" and said that he was approaching "an unheralded title: The congressman who's passed more amendments than any of his 434 peers."

In October 2013, his campaign sent out a fundraising email that compared the Tea Party to the Ku Klux Klan. It used the image of a burning cross as the "T" in Tea Party. Matt Gorman of the National Republican Congressional Committee described the e-mail as "hateful words and imagery". Grayson said he saw "overwhelming evidence that the Tea Party is the home of bigotry and discrimination in America today, just as the KKK was for an earlier generation."

=== Political positions ===
==== Federal Reserve ====
During his first term in office, Grayson supported Ron Paul's Audit the Fed legislation. Grayson gained attention for exchanges with Federal Reserve System Vice Chairman Donald Kohn and Inspector General Elizabeth A. Coleman. The 5-minute examination of Coleman in the House Financial Services Committee was posted on Grayson's official YouTube page, and as of December 2010, it has been viewed more than 4 million times.

In a September 2009 The Alex Jones Show segment, Grayson criticized Federal Reserve Chair Bernanke's senior adviser Linda Robertson, saying "Here I am the only member of Congress who actually worked as an economist, this lobbyist, this K-Street whore, is trying to teach me about economics!" Robertson had previously worked as a lobbyist for Enron. Grayson's language was widely criticized as inappropriate, and Grayson apologized.

Following the AIG bonus payments controversy, Grayson joined fellow freshman Democrat Jim Himes of Connecticut to introduce the Grayson–Himes Pay for Performance Act, legislation to require that all bonuses paid by companies that had received funds under the Emergency Economic Stabilization Act of 2008 be "based on performance". The bill was co-sponsored by eight other members of the House. On March 26, the bill was approved by the House Financial Services Committee by a vote of 38–22 and on April 1, the bill was passed by the full House of Representatives by a vote of 247–171, although it eventually died in the Senate.

Grayson was a co-sponsor of the Federal Reserve Transparency Act of 2009, which would provide additional provisions to audit the Federal Reserve, including removing several key exemptions.

==== Economic stimulus ====
Grayson made it a priority to increase the amount of federal money returning to his district. He often said that people in his district had been "exporting taxes and importing debt." During his first year in office, the amount of federal grant dollars returning to the district nearly doubled. Grayson established a grant notification system that notifies subscribers immediately when a federal grant opportunity in their areas of interest becomes available. He also hired a full-time grants coordinator who focused solely on helping people navigate the federal grants process.

Grayson supported the American Recovery and Reinvestment Act of 2009, and has been outspoken in favor of extending unemployment benefits for Americans who have lost their jobs, arguing that the government had never cut off unemployment insurance when the unemployment rate was higher than eight percent. Grayson also voted for FDA oversight of tobacco products, which would give the FDA power to regulate tobacco.

Grayson has worked to combat federal waste, fraud, and abuse. In the September 6, 2009 edition of The New York Times, columnist Gretchen Morgenson thanked Grayson for uncovering the fact that, due to the federal bailout of mortgage finance giant Fannie Mae, taxpayer money had been funding the legal defense fees for former top executives at the institution. Grayson requested information about these legal costs after a June 2009 hearing of the House Financial Services Committee. Grayson's work uncovered that, between September 6, 2008, and July 21, 2009, taxpayers spent $6.3 million defending Fannie Mae executives Franklin Raines, J. Timothy Howard, and Leanne Spencer. Taxpayers paid an additional $16.8 million to cover legal expenses of workers at the Office of Federal Housing Enterprise Oversight, Fannie's former regulator.

In September 2009, Grayson used a parliamentary maneuver called an "extension of remarks" to provide crucial instruction on H.R. 3221, the Student Aid and Fiscal Responsibility Act of 2009, a bill that, among other things, included a provision that prohibited funding for ACORN (the Association of Community Organizations for Reform Now). Grayson's extension of remarks directed that the legislation defund any organization that cheats the federal government, not just ACORN. The defunding measure passed the House with a final vote of 253–171. Grayson also encouraged the public to report companies covered by the bill and set up a method to report offending companies via his Congressional website.

==== Health care reform ====
In response to Republican arguments that the Obama administration's preferred health care bill was too long and complicated, Grayson on March 9, 2010, introduced H.R. 4789, the Public Option Act (sometimes called the Medicare You Can Buy Into Act), a four-page bill that would allow all citizens and permanent residents of the United States to buy into the public Medicare program at cost. The bill attracted 82 co-sponsors and was referred to the Ways and Means Committee.

Grayson later voted for the Patient Protection and Affordable Care Act and the Health Care and Education Reconciliation Act of 2010. He voted in support of eliminating adjustments of Medicare rates of payment. He also voted against Republican substitutes for the health care amendment and insurance law amendments.

On September 29, 2009, in a late-night speech on the House floor, Grayson presented his impression of the Republicans' health care plan, illustrated by signs. He said the Republicans' plan was "don't get sick", and "if you do get sick, die quickly." After demands from Republicans that he apologize, he defended his comment and in a House floor speech stated, "I apologize to the dead and their families that we haven't voted sooner to end this holocaust in America." He was then further lambasted for his use of the word holocaust by Jewish spokespersons across the nation. Grayson, who is Jewish, apologized to the Anti-Defamation League for those offended by his generic use of holocaust. He also maintained that Congressional Republicans failed to offer a feasible plan. In October 2009, he launched NamesOfTheDead.com, a website to "memorialize Americans who die because they don't have health insurance". He subsequently read stories of the dead submitted through the Names of the Dead site on the House floor.

==== Social issues ====
Grayson is pro-choice and supports increased funding for stem cell research. He has always supported same-sex marriage and said in an interviews in 2013, "the propaganda that somehow gay marriage makes straight marriage bad for everyone is just farcical to me. I just don't understand the logic of it."

Grayson voted in support of the Hate Crimes Expansion Act, which expands the definition of hate crimes and strengthens enforcement of hate crime laws. He also voted for the Lilly Ledbetter Fair Pay Act. Grayson supported the Paycheck Fairness Act, a bill that allows victims of wage discrimination to sue for punitive damages.

==== Environment ====
Grayson voted for the House's 2009 American Clean Energy and Security Act (ACES). The bill would provide for a $50 million "Hurricane Research Center" in Central Florida, and Grayson claimed it would immediately generate new jobs. Grayson noted after the passage of the ACES Act his concern about our dependence on foreign oil, the need to promote green technologies, renewable energy sources, and the job creation from the bill (an estimated 95,000 jobs in Florida). "This bill unleashes American ingenuity to solve the energy crisis. It lets us solve our problems by being Americans and thinking our way out of it. We will become an international energy power," he said in a news release.

The BP oil spill in the Gulf of Mexico affected Florida's number one industry, which is tourism. The lack of a relief well prevented company officials from shutting down the leak immediately. Instead, it took months to drill a new relief well, while millions of gallons of oil gushed into the Gulf each week. In response, Grayson introduced the Emergency Relief Well Act, which would require that an emergency relief well be drilled at the same time as any new exploratory well.

==== Foreign affairs ====
Grayson has been an outspoken critic of the wars in Iraq and Afghanistan. In May 2010, he introduced the War Is Making You Poor Act. The bill would require the president to fund the wars from the Department of Defense's base budget. The bill does not necessitate an end to the wars or mandate a cut-off date. In addition to the tax cuts, the bill would cut the federal deficit by $15.9 billion.

Grayson has tried to combat wasteful spending by government defense contractors by introducing his "Gold Plating" amendment. The amendment would require that cost or price account for half of the evaluation of bids for defense contracts. The law at the time allowed for cost to account for only 1% of the evaluation. The amendment passed as part of the National Defense Authorization Act in June 2009. However, the language was stripped from the final bill during the conference committee between Senate and House leaders. Grayson worked successfully to get the amendment inserted into H.R.5013, the IMPROVE Acquisition Act, which passed the U.S. House of Representatives on April 28, 2010.

Grayson has been an outspoken opponent of plans for the United States to intervene in the Syrian civil war. He has rejected what he calls "warmongering", saying: "It's simply not our responsibility. We're not the world's policeman." Instead, he called for a focus on humanitarian efforts and solving domestic problems. He launched DontAttackSyria.com, where he began gathering signatures for his petition calling on Congress to vote against authorizing military action against Syria, and was "whipping votes" in the House.

=== Committee assignments ===
==== 2013–2017 ====
- Committee on Foreign Affairs
  - Subcommittee on the Middle East and South Asia
  - Subcommittee on the Western Hemisphere
- Committee on Science, Space and Technology
  - Subcommittee on Energy
  - Subcommittee on Environment

==== 2009–2011 ====
- Committee on Financial Services
  - Subcommittee on Capital Markets, Insurance, and Government-Sponsored Enterprises
- Committee on Science and Technology
  - Subcommittee on Investigations and Oversight
  - Subcommittee on Space and Aeronautics

== Personal life ==
Grayson was ranked as the 11th-wealthiest member of Congress in 2010, based on financial disclosure forms with a net worth of $31.41 million, and a pending claim against the now-defunct Derivium Capital for at least $25 million, according to Roll Call. Grayson disclosed that his attorney fees and costs for the war contractor case had exceeded $4 million.

Grayson was married to a woman he met in the early 1980s at a party in Boulder, Colorado. Grayson remarried in 1990 to Lolita Grayson. While pursuing the whistleblower cases, Grayson worked from a home office in Orlando, where he lived with his second wife, Lolita Grayson, and their five children. The couple separated in March 2014, and Alan Grayson asked a court in Orlando to annul the marriage a year later. In April 2015 the Graysons agreed to settle the dispute and annul their 25-year marriage. Lolita Grayson accused Alan Grayson of domestic abuse that lasted over the decades of their marriage; Alan Grayson denied the charges.

On May 31, 2016, Alan Grayson married his third wife, Dr. Dena Minning. In 2016, Minning ran for the US House seat Grayson was vacating to pursue his Senate run. She was defeated in the Democratic primary.

In December 2019, Grayson released a book titled High Crimes: The Impeachment of Donald Trump.

== See also ==
- List of Jewish members of the United States Congress

U.S. House of Representatives
Preceded by Ric Keller	Member of the U.S. House of Representatives from Florida's 8th congressional district 2009–2011	Succeeded by Daniel Webster
Preceded by Gus Bilirakis	Member of the U.S. House of Representatives from Florida's 9th congressional district 2013–2017	Succeeded by Darren Soto
U.S. order of precedence (ceremonial)
Preceded by Tom Feeney as Former U.S. Representative	Order of precedence of the United States as Former U.S. Representative	Succeeded by Rich Nugent as Former U.S. Representative
