= John K. Stargel =

American politician

John Stargel
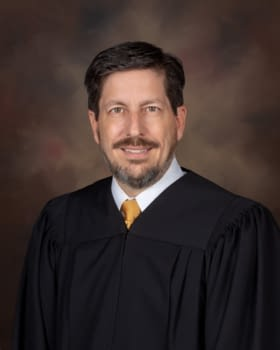

Judge of the Florida Second District Court of Appeal
- Incumbent
- Assumed office 2020
- Preceded by: Samuel Salario

Judge of the Tenth Judicial Circuit Court of Florida
- In office 2006–2020
- Preceded by: Nathaniel White
- Succeeded by: Jennifer Swenson

Member of the Florida House of Representatives from the 64th district
- In office 2002–2006
- Preceded by: Paula Dockery
- Succeeded by: Dennis Ross

Personal details
- Born: May 14, 1964 (age 62)
- Party: Republican
- Spouse: Kelli Stargel
- Education: University of Tampa (BS); Florida State University (JD)
- Profession: Attorney

John K. Stargel (born May 14, 1964) is an American politician and judge in Florida.

Stargel was a Representative in the Florida House of Representatives. He received his bachelor's degree from the University of Tampa in 1987. In addition, he received his Juris Doctor from Florida State University in 1991. He lives in Lakeland, Florida with his family. In 2006, he was elected as a circuit judge and in 2008 his wife, Kelli Stargel, was elected to his former seat in the Florida House.
