= Randolph Bracy =

American politician

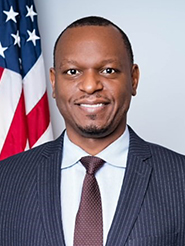

Member of the Florida Senate from the 11th district
- In office November 8, 2016 – November 8, 2022
- Preceded by: Geraldine Thompson (redistricting)
- Succeeded by: Geraldine Thompson (redistricting)

Member of the Florida House of Representatives from the 45th district
- In office November 6, 2012 – November 8, 2016
- Preceded by: Constituency established
- Succeeded by: Kamia Brown

Personal details
- Born: Randolph Bracy III; April 23, 1977 (age 49) Jacksonville, Florida, U.S.
- Party: Democratic
- Relations: LaVon Bracy Davis (sister)
- Children: 2
- Education: College of William and Mary (BS); University of Central Florida (MBA, MS)

Randolph Bracy III (born April 23, 1977) is an American politician who was a member of the Florida Senate from the 11th district. Bracy's district included parts of central and northwest Orange County. Bracy was the first African American to serve as Chair of the Criminal Justice Committee. As a member of the State Senate, Bracy pushed for the establishment of Juneteenth as a state holiday. Prior to his election to the Senate, Bracy was a member of the Florida House of Representatives from 2012 to 2016, representing the 45th district.

== Early life and education ==
Bracy was born in Jacksonville to Randolph Bracy, Jr. and LaVon Wright Bracy, the founders of the New Covenant Baptist Church in Orlando. He earned a Bachelor of Science degree in Psychology from the College of William & Mary where he starred on the basketball team, followed by a Master of Business Administration and Master of Science in sports administration from the University of Central Florida.

== Career ==
Prior to holding elected office, Bracy worked as the Director of Business Development at Workforce Advantage Academy, a charter school in Orange County.

=== Florida House of Representatives ===
In 2012, following the reconfiguration of Florida House of Representatives districts, Bracy opted to run in the newly created 45th district, which includes Apopka, Ocoee, and Winter Garden and has a minority-majority population. He faced Shannon Currie, a former legislative aide to retiring State Senator Gary Siplin, in the Democratic primary. The Orlando Sentinel endorsed Bracy, praising his "real-world experience in building partnerships to entice businesses."

In the end, Bracy narrowly defeated Currie, winning with 54% of the vote and a 562 vote margin of victory. He faced the Republican nominee, Ronny Oliveira, in the general election, and once again, the Sentinel endorsed him for his "better articulated vision for improving the district." As was to be expected in this heavily Democratic district, Bracy defeated Oliveira in a landslide, receiving 69% of the vote, and was sworn into his first term in the Florida House of Representatives later that year. In 2014, Bracy was re-elected to his second term without opposition.

=== Florida Senate ===
In 2016, Bracy announced that he would run for the Florida Senate in the 11th district, following incumbent senator Geraldine Thompson's decision to run for Florida's 10th Congressional District. Bracy defeated environmental activist Chuck O'Neal, former Orange County Commissioner Bob Sindler, and former state senator Gary Siplin in the Democratic primary. He defeated write-in opponents in the general election.

In 2021, Bracy voted against Senate Bill 86.

=== 2022 Congressional campaign ===
On May 25, 2021, Bracy announced his bid for the U.S. House of Representatives Florida's 10th congressional district 2022 election to replace incumbent Val Demings. He finished second in a field that included, among others, political activist Maxwell Frost, who won, as well as former US Representatives Alan Grayson and Corrine Brown in the August 23, 2022 Democratic primary.

== Political positions ==
=== Gun control ===
In the Florida Senate, Bracy has advocated for and consistently supported legislation to prohibit the sale or transfer of assault weapons and large-capacity magazine. Bracy also co-sponsored legislation to ban assault weapons in both 2021 and 2022.

=== COVID-19 ===
In April 2020, Bracy called on legislative leaders to consider a special session of the legislature to increase the amount of money and duration of state unemployment benefits. The request was not acted upon, with legislative leaders pointing to substantial additional federal unemployment checks authorized in the CARES Act.

In the 2021 Florida legislature session, Bracy was appointed vice-chair of the Senate Select Committee on Pandemic Preparedness and Response. He introduced a bill to increase state unemployment benefits from $275 to $400 maximum weekly benefits and extend eligibility from 19 weeks to 26 weeks.

=== Criminal justice ===
In December 2020, Bracy introduced a bill to allow those with misdemeanor marijuana convictions to expunge their criminal records.

In January 2021, Bracy filed a bill to create a public-records exemption that would broadly prohibit the public release of booking photos (known informally as mug shots), except in certain circumstances such as an immediate threat to the public. Bracy's statement argued that the publication of booking photographs on the internet has made them remain in perpetuity and caused "persistent and permanent" damage, even in cases where charges are ultimately dropped, "the person is ultimately found not guilty by a judge or jury, or his or her arrest record is subsequently sealed or expunged.”

=== Police reform ===
In June 2020, Bracy authored an op-ed in the Orlando Sentinel arguing the state legislature "must reform police in wake of brutality" in the wake of the murder of George Floyd by Minneapolis police. He requested a special session of the Florida legislature to address police brutality and bias against African-Americans, which was turned down by the legislature. Bracy's proposal for a special session included 10 measures he wanted considered including: removing investigations of police shootings from internal to outside entities, increasing jury pay; ensuring diversity on jury panels; mandated officer training on “implicit bias and de-escalation;” published annual data on an “analysis on racial disparity;” and inclusion of a “civilian review board member” on an investigative team.

In the 2021 Florida legislative session, Bracy sponsored several bills, including SB 730, that would lead to officers facing third-degree felony charges under certain circumstances where they use chokeholds or other related tactics. The proposed "Strangulation by a law enforcement officer" offense would lead to felony charges if an on duty officer "knowingly and intentionally impedes the normal breathing or circulation of the blood of an individual so as to create a risk of or cause great bodily harm or death by applying pressure on the throat or neck of the individual or by blocking the nose or mouth of the individual, including the use of a chokehold or similar restraint.”

Another bill introduced was SB454, which would have required local law enforcement to collect and report monthly the number of traffic stops completed, the race and ethnicity of the police officer and the race and ethnicity of the person stopped. He also introduced SB452 and 482 mandating uniformed standards for body and dashboard cameras and creating a statewide police misconduct registry that tracks the history of law enforcement officers, respectively.

=== Race and discrimination ===
In October 2019, Bracy introduced legislation (SB 566) to add “protected hairstyle” to state civil rights laws as an "impermissible grounds for bias," alongside current protected classes such as race, religion, gender, national origin, age, handicap and marital status. The "Creating a Respectful and Open World for Natural Hair (CROWN) Act” would prohibit discrimination based on natural hairstyles, targeting policies in employment and within schools, where dress codes may limit hair styles.

In June 2020, Bracy began a push to make Juneteenth a state holiday, with June 19 marking the date the news of the Emancipation Proclamation reached Texas, the westernmost member of the former Confederacy.

=== Solar energy ===
Bracy was one of few Democrats to vote for legislation authored by utility company Florida Power & Light (FPL) to phase out net metering for rooftop solar panels. The legislation would undermine the state’s growing solar industry and benefit companies like FPL that compete with solar energy.

Florida House of Representatives
Preceded by Richard Corcoran	Member of the Florida House of Representatives from the 45th district 2012–2016	Succeeded by Kamia Brown
Florida Senate
Preceded by Alan Hays	Member of the Florida Senate from the 11th district 2016–present	Incumbent
