= Florida's 22nd Senate district =

Florida's 22nd State Senate district
Senator
Joe Gruters; R–Sarasota

Florida's 22nd Senate district elects one member to the Florida State Senate. It contains Sarasota County and parts of Manatee County. It previously contained northern Polk County and southern Lake County in Central Florida.

== Members ==
Portrait	Name	Party	Years of service	Home city	Map	Notes
	Jeff Brandes	Republican	2012–2016		Polk County and Lake County	
	Kelli Stargel	Republican	2016–2022		Polk County and Lake County	
	Joe Gruters	Republican	2022–present	Lakeland		
