= Jeff Brandes =

American politician

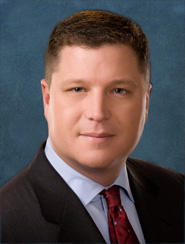

Member of the Florida Senate
- In office November 6, 2012 – November 8, 2022
- Preceded by: Redistricted
- Succeeded by: Nick DiCeglie
- Constituency: 22nd district (2012–2016); 24th district (2016–2022)

Member of the Florida House of Representatives from the 52nd district
- In office November 2, 2010 – November 6, 2012
- Preceded by: Bill Heller
- Succeeded by: Redistricted

Personal details
- Born: February 12, 1976 (age 50) St. Petersburg, Florida, U.S.
- Party: Republican
- Education: Marion Military Institute (AA); Carson-Newman College (BS)
- Profession: Real estate

Military service
- Allegiance: United States
- Branch/service: United States Army Reserve
- Years of service: 1996–2007
- Battles/wars: Iraq War

Jeffrey P. Brandes (born February 12, 1976) is an American politician who served as the Florida State Senator from the 24th district from 2016 to 2022. A member of the Republican Party, he has been elected from the Pinellas County area to the Florida Senate since 2012, representing the 22nd district from 2012 to 2016. Brandes previously served as the Florida State Representative for the 52nd district from 2010 to 2012.

== Early life and education ==
A native of St. Petersburg, Florida, Brandes served in the United States Army Reserve as a transportation officer from 1996 to 2007 following his graduation from the Marion Military Institute in Marion, Alabama in 1996 and while he attended Carson-Newman College, from which he graduated in 1999 with a degree in business administration. From 2003 to 2004, Brandes served in the Iraq War, for which he earned a Combat Action Badge.

== Political career ==
In 2010, Brandes ran for the Florida House of Representatives from the 52nd district, which was based in Pinellas County, challenging incumbent Democratic State Representative Bill Heller. In a good year for Republicans nationwide and statewide, Brandes narrowly defeated Heller, winning over him with 51% of the vote.

Following the reconfiguration of Florida Senate districts in 2012, Brandes opted to run in the 22nd district, which encompassed the southern part of Pinellas County and South Tampa, rather than seek a second term in the House. In the Republican primary, he faced fellow State Representative Jim Frishe. Brandes was endorsed by former Governor Jeb Bush; he defeated Frishe with 56% of the vote. He was unopposed in the general election.

In 2016, he ran unopposed in both the primary and general election in the 24th district. During the 2018 general election, Jeff Brandes defeated Lindsay Cross for his reelection in the 24th district. While serving in the Senate, Brandes, an opponent of red-light cameras, attached a provision onto highway safety legislation that would "require the cities and counties [that have cameras] to create an administrative appeals process for motorists who contest the initial red-light camera violations." Additionally, he sponsored legislation that was signed into law by Governor Rick Scott dealing with the "pension plans that cover public safety workers"; the legislation was strongly opposed by police and firefighter unions, who warned that it would "cause a spike in pension costs."

Brandes received a 114.3% (A+) score from Americans for Prosperity, a conservative advocacy group funded by the billionaire Koch Brothers. He was the #1 rated legislator by far for AFP in Florida.

Brandes's district was reconfigured and renumbered after court-ordered redistricting in 2016. It now includes only portions of the southern part of Pinellas County. On March 3, 2018, Brandes rejected a two-year moratorium on the sale of AR-15s.

He voted yea for Senate Bill 86 in 2021.

Brandes opposed a 2022 bill that would repeal no-fault auto insurance, describing support for the bill as "legislative malpractice". He also voted with Democrats on the repeal of the Reedy Creek Improvement Act, meaning he voted against the repeal measure.

In March 2022, Brandes voted for HB 5, which prohibits abortion after 15 weeks. The bill was later signed into law.

Brandes was unable to run for reelection in 2022 due to term-limits.

Florida House of Representatives
Preceded by Bill Heller	Member of the Florida House of Representatives from the 52nd district 2010–2012	Succeeded by Ritch Workman
Florida Senate
Preceded by David Simmons	Member of the Florida Senate from the 22nd district 2012–2016	Succeeded by Kelli Stargel
Preceded by Tom Lee	Member of the Florida Senate from the 24th district 2016–2022	Succeeded by Bobby Powell
