= Dena Grayson =

American medical doctor and biochemist

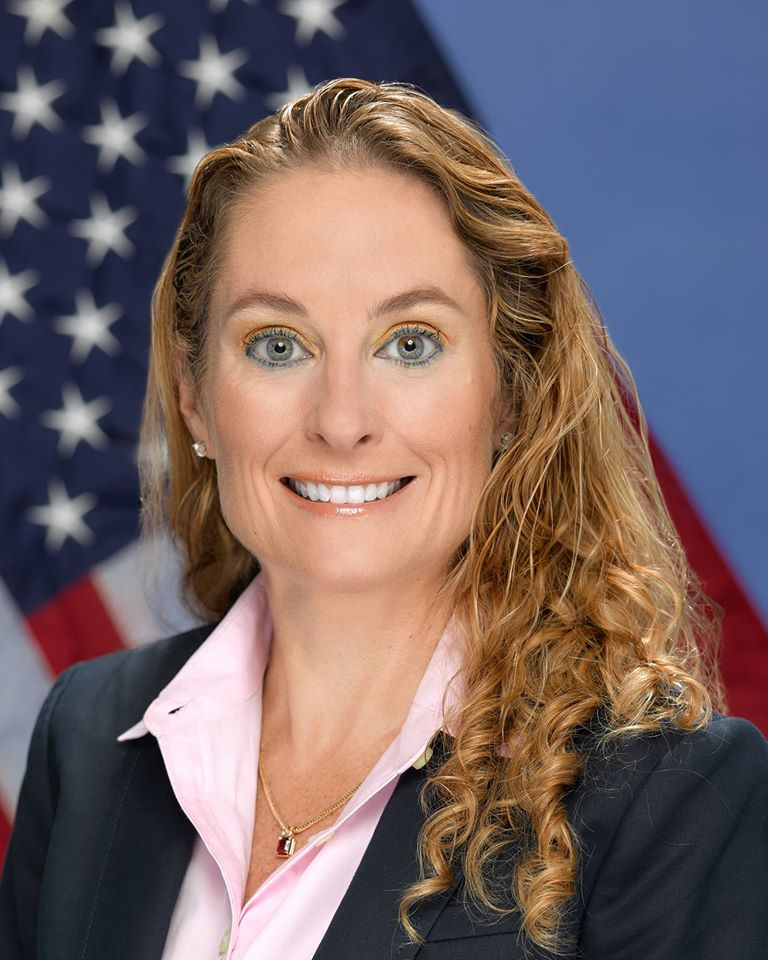

Personal details
- Born: Dena Minning; January 5, 1971 (age 55) Melbourne, Florida, U.S.
- Party: Democratic
- Spouse: Alan Grayson (m. 2016)
- Education: University of Florida (BS); Washington University (MS, MD, PhD)
- Website: Campaign website

Dena Minning Grayson (née Minning, January 5, 1971) is an American medical doctor and researcher. In 2016, she ran unsuccessfully for the Democratic nomination for the United States House of Representatives for Florida's 9th congressional district.

== Early life and education ==
Dena Minning Grayson was born on January 5, 1971, in Melbourne, Florida. Grayson graduated from Melbourne High School in 1988 where she was a member of the varsity soccer team that captured the Florida High School State Championship in 1987. She earned her Bachelor of Science degree from the University of Florida in 1992. After graduating from college, Grayson enrolled in the Medical Scientist Training Program at Washington University School of Medicine, where she earned an MD and a PhD in biochemistry and molecular cell biology. In 1999, The New York Times, Science Daily and the Duke Chronicle covered research on Ascaris hemoglobin that Grayson had published in Nature, and stated, "The discovery may yield new therapies for diseases such as cancer, in which starving tumors of oxygen is a major therapeutic focus." Grayson completed her internship in internal medicine at the University of California, San Francisco.

== Career ==
Grayson has a medical degree. In the early 2000s, she shifted her focus to medical research as a way of treating multiple patients by finding cures. She worked as a biotechnology consultant at MEDACorp from 2002-2003. From 2003 to 2008, Grayson served as an Associate Director of Licensing and Director of Medical Sciences at Amgen, and worked on developing treatments for cancers, asthma, anemia, hypercholesterolemia, heart failure, and pain. While at Amgen, she was selected as a Henry Crown Fellow at the Aspen Institute in 2006. Grayson then served as Vice President of Translational Sciences at 3-V Biosciences from 2008 to 2010, where she oversaw the development of broad-spectrum antiviral drugs active against deadly viruses. She served as the Vice President of Translational Sciences for AlloCure from 2011 to 2014, where she led research on a mesenchymal stem cell therapy for acute kidney injury. In 2010, Grayson founded MedExpert Consulting, a biotechnology consulting company, where she helped research and develop BCX4430, a broad-spectrum antiviral drug that is active against Ebola, Marburg, Yellow Fever, Zika, and other deadly viral diseases. Grayson briefly lobbied for BioCryst Pharmaceuticals for 3 months in 2013 and for 1 month in 2014 to fund research of a treatment for Ebola and other deadly viruses. In 2014, she was co-author of an article published in Nature on the efficacy of BCX4430 against Marburg virus and of a paper on the activity of BCX4430 against Yellow Fever.

=== Politics ===
In 2016, she ran unsuccessfully for the Democratic nomination for the United States House of Representatives for Florida's 9th congressional district. Since 2016, Grayson is a regular political commentator on Twitter, and asked onto media such as Fox News to speak on issues such as the Democrats proposal to reform elections. Grayson attended the Michael Cohen hearing in February 2019.

== Personal life ==
Since 2016, she has been married to former Congressman Alan Grayson.
