= Randy Johnson (Florida politician) =

American politician

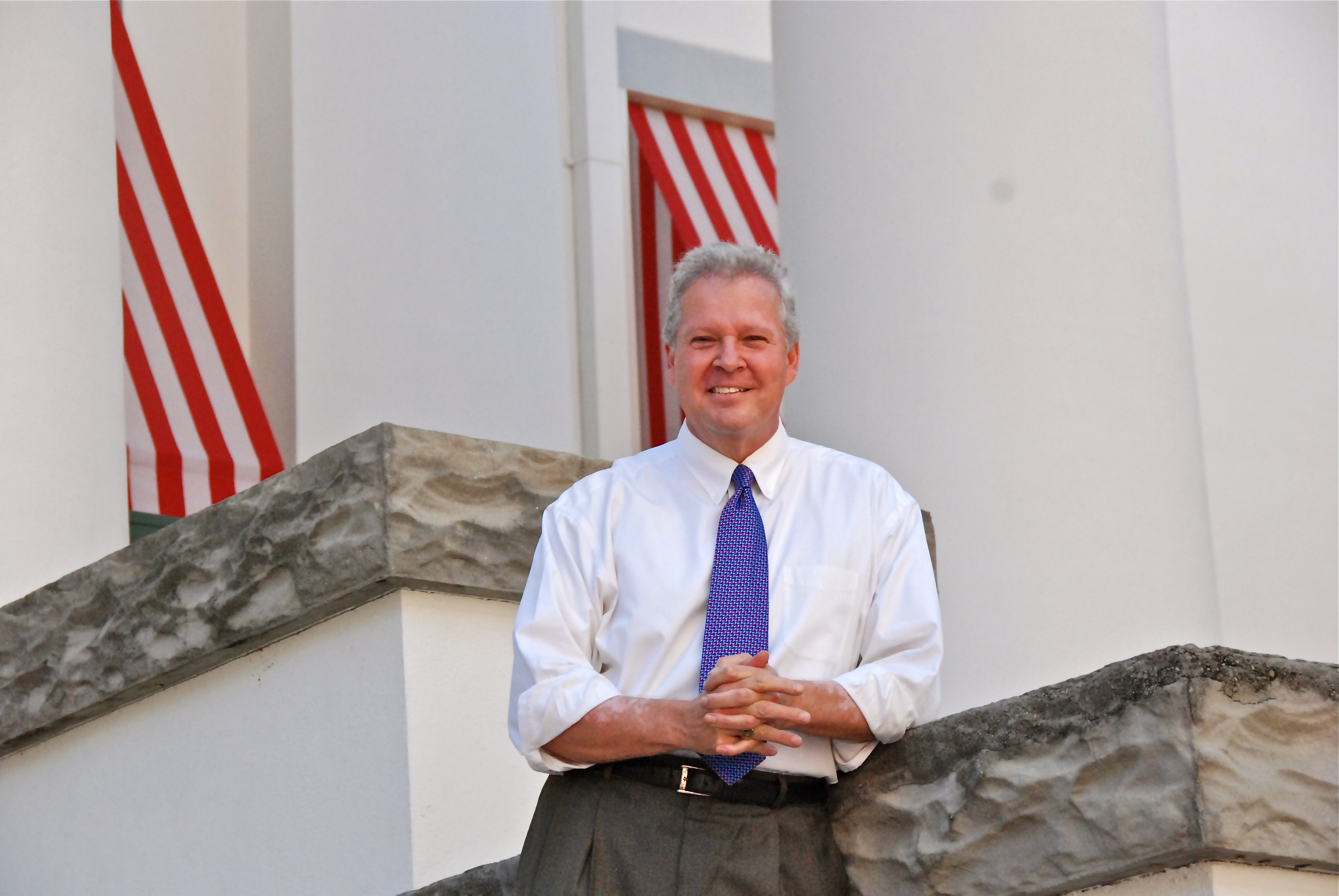

Member of the Florida House of Representatives from the 41 district
- In office 1998–2006
- Preceded by: Daniel Webster
- Succeeded by: Steve Precourt

Personal details
- Born: December 16, 1959 (age 66) Nampa, Idaho, U.S.
- Party: Republican
- Spouse: Nichelle Johnson
- Children: 3
- Education: University of Florida (BA)
- Website: Official House Website

Military service
- Branch/service: United States Navy

Randy Johnson (born December 1959) is an American politician who served as a member of the Florida House of Representatives from 1998 to 2006, representing the 41st District, which included portions of Osceola, Lake and Orange counties. During his tenure in the Florida House, Johnson served as Chairman of multiple committees, including Transportation & Economic Development Appropriations, Growth Management, Finance and Tax, The Select Committee on Affordable Housing and The Select Committee on Post-9/11 Economic Development.

== Early life and education ==
Randy Johnson was born in Nampa, Idaho and moved to Central Florida in 1971. Johnson graduated from the University of Florida in 1981 with a Bachelor's Degree in Economics.

== Career ==
Johnson served as the president and CEO of the Central Florida Sports Commission.

=== Political career ===
After leaving the Navy, Randy Johnson served as a Staff Director for the Orange County Board of County Commissioners.

Johnson ran in the election to succeed Johnnie Byrd as Speaker of the Florida House of Representatives, but lost to Allan Bense.

In 2000, Johnson successfully requested a $250,000 historic preservation grant for Winter Garden's downtown.

In 2002, Johnson proposed an amendment that would require the state to include a projected cost of proposals on ballot measures.

In 2004, Johnson served as President of "No Casinos", a statewide coalition opposed to the expansion of gambling in Florida. His group is credited for the subsequent failure of a gaming expansion initiative in Miami-Dade County during the 2005 Legislative Session.

During the 2005 Legislative Session, Randy Johnson led the House effort to pass sweeping new growth management laws. A staunch property rights advocate, Johnson sponsored legislation that provided a method for developers to fairly pay for the impact that new development has on the surrounding community. He also proposed the creation of the Century Commission, a board of statewide community leaders tasked with addressing future development and environmental problems, as well as providing solutions to the Legislature. For his efforts, he was named 2005 Legislator of The Year by the Florida Association of Realtors.

=== Electoral history ===
2000 Florida 41st House District Primary Election
Party	Candidate	Votes	%
Republican	Randy Johnson	8,006	72
Republican	Mark Schneider	3,100	27

2000 Florida 41st House District General Election
Party	Candidate	Votes	%
Republican	Randy Johnson	42,152	67
Democratic	Ali Kirk Mashayekhi	20,157	32

2002 Florida 41st House District General Election
Party	Candidate	Votes	%
Republican	Randy Johnson	32,796	79
Libertarian	Louis A. Cashmer	8,494	20

2004 Florida 41st House District General Election
Party	Candidate	Votes	%
Republican	Randy Johnson	59,525	99
Write-in_candidate	Donald Mitkess	288	0.5

== See also ==
- Government of Florida
- Republican Party of Florida
