= Doc Dockery =

American businessperson (1933–2022)

Charles Croffard Dockery (May 6, 1933 – August 1, 2022), known as Doc Dockery or C. C. Dockery, was an American businessman in Florida. He was married to Paula Dockery, a former member of the Florida Senate. He is the author of two books, Who’s Killing Workers’ Compensation in Florida and his autobiography Country Boy. He co-authored Beyond the Hill a chronicle of Members of Congress and their work after they left public office. He served as an advisor to two Florida governors and a president, was a member of the Florida Polk County School Board, and led an effort to successfully change Florida’s constitution. He was named a Florida Icon by Florida Trend magazine in their June 2013 issue.

== Early life ==
Dockery was born on May 6, 1933, in Elkin, North Carolina, to Mildred Hurt Dockery and Doctor (name, not title) Albert Dockery.

Dockery attended elementary school in Jonesville, North Carolina, until his father abandoned the family. He then moved with his mother and brother to his grandparents', Henry and Victoria Hurt, rural home near Eagle Mills Township where he continued his education at Union Grove Elementary and High School, graduating high school in three years at age 17. After graduation, he left the tobacco farm to go to work at Sears Roebuck in Greensboro, North Carolina.

In 1951 he joined the U.S. Air Force for a four-year tour of duty and reenlisted for another four-year term in 1955.

While in the Air Force, he was trained as a clerk but was later cross-trained as a public information specialist ending his military career in the fall of 1959. His last assignment was as a speech writer for the commanding general of the 9th Air Force, Shaw Air Force Base, Sumter, South Carolina. He moved to Lakeland, Florida and enrolled at Florida Southern College earning his Bachelor of Science degree with a major in journalism in 1961.

== Business career ==
While at Florida Southern, Dockery edited two trade publications, one for the Florida Plumbing Association and one for the Florida Roofing, Sheet Metal and Air Conditioning Contractors. After graduating from Florida Southern he became the executive director of the Florida Roofing, Sheet Metal and Air Conditioning Contractors Association.

He was employed by the construction trade group for more than 15 years before he left to form his own business, Summit Consulting, Inc. in February 1976 as a real estate holding company and consulting firm for other trade associations. He started his company a year before he left the trade association.

In 1978 Dockery organized Summit’s first self-insurers fund, Associated Industries of Florida, which commenced operations April 1. Later that year, the Florida Retail Federation engaged Summit to start a self-insurers fund for workers’ compensation commencing business January 1, 1979. Additional self-insurers funds for workers’ compensation were formed by Summit in Louisiana, Georgia, Missouri, and Oklahoma.

In 1984 he sold the company to an international brokerage firm. The management team at Summit later bought the company and formed Summit Holdings. Shortly thereafter Dockery was invited to become member of the board of directors of Summit Holdings, helping take the company public in 1997. The company is now owned by American Financial Group.

== Florida high-speed rail efforts ==
In 1984, Dockery became very interested and active in high-speed rail first advanced in Florida by Governor Bob Graham. After the election of Governor Bob Martinez in 1986, Dockery was appointed to the Florida High Speed Rail Commission, serving as chairman before the effort was abandoned.

High-speed rail in Florida was resurrected late in the term of Governor Lawton Chiles when the Florida Department of Transportation entered into an agreement with Florida Overland Express to build a high-speed rail link running from Orlando to Miami. That effort was killed by Governor Jeb Bush shortly after he was elected in 1998.

In 2000 Dockery authored a Florida Constitutional Amendment which required the construction of a high-speed rail network throughout Florida starting with a link between Tampa and Orlando. To implement the constitutional amendment the Florida High Speed Rail Authority was created by the Florida Legislature. He served as a member of that authority. Governor Jeb Bush got the constitutional amendment rescinded by the voters in 2004. Dockery has remained an enthusiastic supporter of high-speed rail, which surfaced again when President Barack Obama was elected in 2008 and pledged more than $2 billion for the construction and operation of the Tampa/Orlando link. Governor Charlie Crist supported the effort but it was again derailed with the election of Governor Rick Scott in 2010 at the urging of the Florida Tea Party, which was vehemently opposed to President Obama’s stimulus plans and the construction of the rail link.

All of the previous failed efforts involved Florida government underwriting the entire endeavor. However, a separate effort called Brightline and built using existing Florida East Coast Railway right of way, not endorsed by Doc Dockery, began in 2012. It has achieved success today by instead using a private enterprise model.

== Death ==
Dockery died August 1, 2022.
