= Florida's 15th Senate district =

American legislative district in Florida

Florida's 15th State Senate district
Senator
LaVon Bracy Davis; D–Ocoee

Florida's 15th Senate district elects one member to the Florida State Senate. It contains parts of Orange County.

== Members ==
Portrait	Name	Party	Years of service	Home city	Notes
	Patsy Ann Kurth	Democratic	1992–2000		
	Bill Posey	Republican	2000–2002		
	Paula Dockery	Republican	2002–2012		
	Kelli Stargel	Republican	2012–2016		
	Vic Torres	Democratic	2016–2022		
	Geraldine Thompson	Democratic	2022–2025		
	LaVon Bracy Davis	Democratic	2025–present		
