= Seth McKeel =

American politician

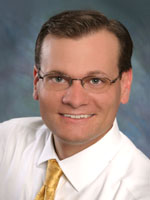

Member of the Florida House of Representatives
- In office November 7, 2006 – November 4, 2014
- Preceded by: Dennis Ross
- Succeeded by: Colleen Burton
- Constituency: 63rd District (2006–2012); 40th District (2012–2014)

Personal details
- Born: June 5, 1975 (age 51) Lakeland, Florida
- Party: Republican
- Education: University of Florida (B.A.)
- Profession: Real estate agent

Seth McKeel (born June 5, 1975) was a Republican member of the Florida House of Representatives from 2006 to 2014, representing the 63rd District from 2006 to 2012 and the 40th District, which included most of metropolitan Lakeland in Polk County, from 2012 to 2014.

== History ==
McKeel attended the University of Florida, where he graduated in 1997 with a degree in political science. He studied British politics abroad in the United Kingdom at the Florida State University London Study Centre. In 2000, McKeel was elected to the Lakeland City Commission, where he served until December 2005.

== Florida House of Representatives ==
In 2006, incumbent State Representative Dennis A. Ross opted to run for re-election in the 64th District rather than the 63rd, where he had previously been elected, creating an open seat. McKeel opted to run in the 63rd District, which included much of western Polk County and southeastern Hillsborough County and won the Republican primary unopposed. In the general election, he campaigned on "small business regulation and education" and faced massage therapist James Davis, the Democratic nominee, who shared a name with the unsuccessful Democratic nominee for Governor, Jim Davis; McKeel took the name association seriously, noting that he was "nervous about what his opponent's name might mean on a night when Democrats were doing well across the country." However, he was ultimately successful over Davis, winning with over 60% of the vote. In both 2008 and 2010, McKeel was elected unopposed.

Following the reconfiguration of legislative districts in 2012, McKeel was drawn into the 40th District, which was based entirely in Polk County and included most of metropolitan Lakeland. He won the nomination of his party unopposed and advanced to the general election, where he was opposed by independent candidate Lillian Lima. His opponent largely campaigned on replacing most politicians with fresher faces, while McKeel defended his record, noting, "I ran my first campaign on my vision for my hometown and a deeply rooted belief in limited government and fiscal conservatism. That record is very public, and I am proud of it." Ultimately, McKeel turned away Lima's challenge, winning election to his final term in the legislature with 64% of the vote.

When Chief Financial Officer of Florida Jeff Atwater was under consideration to be President of the Florida Atlantic University in 2014, when he was running for re-election, McKeel was considered a possible candidate to replace Atwater on the ballot as the Republican nominee. Ultimately, however, Atwater was not selected and instead successfully ran for re-election.
