= Geraldine Thompson =

American politician (1948–2025)

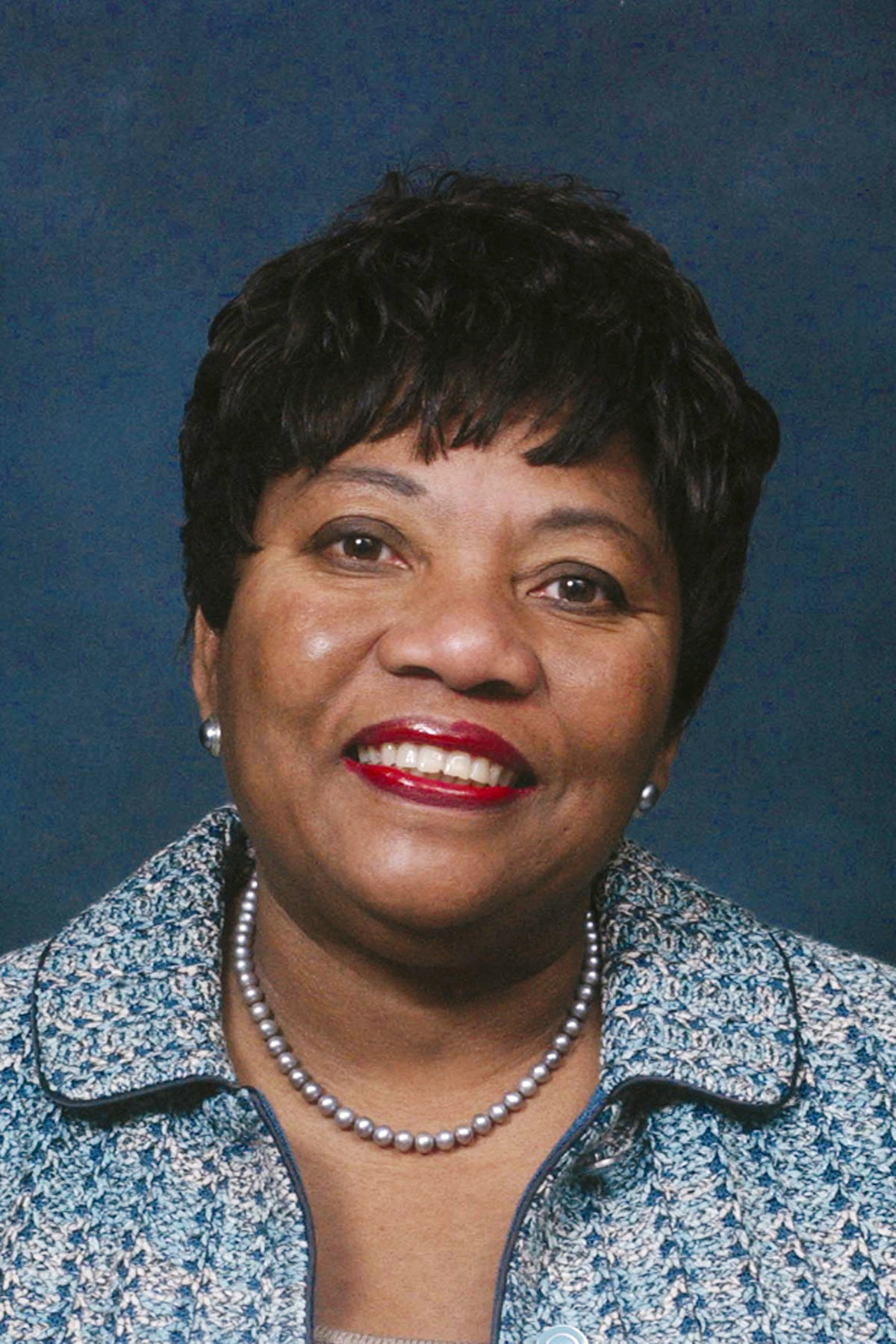
- Official portrait, c. 2006

Member of the Florida Senate from the 15th district
- In office November 8, 2022 – February 13, 2025
- Preceded by: Randolph Bracy (redistricting)
- Succeeded by: LaVon Bracy Davis

Member of the Florida House of Representatives from the 44th district
- In office November 6, 2018 – November 8, 2022
- Preceded by: Bobby Olszewski
- Succeeded by: Carolina Amesty (redistricting)

Member of the Florida Senate from the 12th district
- In office November 6, 2012 – November 8, 2016
- Preceded by: Gary Siplin (redistricting)
- Succeeded by: Randolph Bracy (redistricting)

Member of the Florida House of Representatives from the 39th district
- In office November 7, 2006 – November 6, 2012
- Preceded by: Bruce Antone
- Succeeded by: Bruce Antone (redistricting)

Personal details
- Born: Geraldine Fortenberry; November 18, 1948 New Orleans, Louisiana, U.S.
- Died: February 13, 2025 (aged 76) Orlando, Florida, U.S.
- Party: Democratic
- Education: Miami-Dade Community College (AA); University of Miami (BEd); Florida State University (MS)
- Profession: Educator

Geraldine Fortenberry Thompson (November 18, 1948 – February 13, 2025) was an American politician and member of the Democratic Party serving in various capacities in the Florida Legislature from 2006 until her death in 2025. She served as a member of the Florida State Senate from 2012 to 2016, representing parts of Orlando and western Orange County. She also served three terms in the Florida House of Representatives, from 2006 to 2012. Thompson returned as a member of the Florida House of Representatives, representing the 44th District from 2018 to 2022.

Her district included Windermere, Winter Garden, Gotha, Lake Buena Vista, Oakland, parts of Ocoee, and the Dr. Phillips, Horizon West, Hunters Creek, and Williamsburg communities in Southwest Orange County, FL. The district contains Walt Disney World, Universal Studios Florida, SeaWorld, International Drive, and the Orange County Convention Center.

== Life and career ==
Thompson was born on November 18, 1948 in New Orleans, Louisiana, and moved to Florida in 1955. She grew up in the town of Perrine where her family worked in agriculture and construction. She attended Miami-Dade Community College and received a scholarship to attend the University of Miami. She enrolled shortly after that school ended racial segregation. In 1970, she received a bachelor's degree with honors in journalism and business education. She moved with her husband, Emerson, to Tallahassee, where he attended law school and she worked in state government and higher education. Her first position in Tallahassee was as Executive Secretary to Representative Gwendolyn Sawyer Cherry, the first African American woman to serve in the Florida House of Representatives. Thompson received a Master of Science degree in Communication from Florida State University in 1973. She then joined her husband in Orlando and began work as a teacher in Orange County Public Schools. After six years, she left the classroom to accept a position as Director of the Equal Opportunity Office at Valencia Community College where she served for 24 years as Assistant to the President.

In 2002, Thompson ran for the Florida House of Representatives from the 39th District, which included parts of downtown Orlando in Orange County, against Bruce Antone, Tiffany Moore Russell, and Jon Eason. Thompson's campaign focused on education and economic development. The Orlando Sentinel, while praising Thompson as "well-intentioned" and citing her experience in saving the Well'sbuilt Hotel and converting it to a history museum, endorsed Antone, noting that Thompson lacked Antone's "ability to get things done for the entire district." She came in third place, receiving 26% of the vote to Antone's 34% and Moore Russell's 31%, and Eason's 9%.

Thompson again ran for office in 2004 when she challenged incumbent State Senator Gary Siplin in the Democratic primary in the 19th District, which included parts of central Orange County and northern Osceola County. During the campaign, she attacked Siplin for his tenure in office, asserting that he was "ineffective" and focused more on talking about solutions than solving problems, alienating local leaders in the process. The Sentinel agreed with Thompson, asking, "What has Mr. Siplin actually done for his constituents?" and noting, "Even Mr. Siplin is hard-pressed to find an answer." The Sentinel ended up endorsing Thompson, commending her "political savvy and dogged determination to actually get things done." Ultimately, however, she ended up falling short to Siplin, receiving 40% of the vote to his 60%.

== Florida House of Representatives ==
When Antone, whom Thompson had previously run against, opted against seeking a fourth term in the House to instead unsuccessfully run for the Orange County Commission, Thompson ran to succeed him. In the Democratic primary, she faced Prince Brown, a retired Navy lieutenant and a public health consultant, and Fritz Jackson Seide, an accountant and real estate broker. Thompson campaigned on her support for affordable housing for low-income residents of the district, improved public transportation systems, and on addressing crime by expanding economic opportunity. Thompson was endorsed by the Orlando Sentinel, which cited her deep commitment to the region and her "scope of experience." Ultimately, she defeated both of her opponents in a landslide, winning 60% of the vote to Brown's 25% and Jackson's 15%. She was then elected without an opponent in the general election, and was re-elected without opposition in 2008 and 2010.

== Florida Senate ==
Senator Siplin was unable to seek another term in 2012 due to term limits, so Thompson once again ran for the Florida Senate. This time, she faced Siplin's wife, Victoria Siplin, in the Democratic primary. Thompson campaigned on a platform of enhancing access to public education and job creation, and attacked Siplin for relying on taxpayer-funded mailers, sent out by her husband's Senate office, to promote herself. In the end, she defeated Victoria Siplin with 56% of the vote. Thompson then ran against Fritz Seide Jackson, the Republican nominee who had previously opposed her in the Democratic primary in 2006. The Orlando Sentinel endorsed Thompson, praising her as a "serious person, and a champion for public education and job creation," while criticizing Seide for only running as a "Republican for this race so he could make it to the general election."

When Thompson ran for re-election in 2014, she was challenged in the Democratic primary by Gary Siplin. She attacked Siplin for skipping public debates, saying, "I think voters deserve an opportunity to compare his ideas and my ideas so they can make an informed decision." The Sentinel once endorsed Thompson, praising her as a "compassionate and capable legislator" and a "strong advocate for public education and public health," while criticizing Siplin for his "ineffectual leadership" and lack of "record or respect in Tallahassee." In a contrast to the relatively close primary two years earlier, Thompson defeated Siplin in a landslide, winning 64% of the vote to his 36%. Advancing to the general election, she faced Edward DeAguilera, a development director for the Down Syndrome Association of Central Florida and the Republican nominee. Once again, the Sentinel endorsed Thompson, though praising DeAguilera for having a "bright future" should he stay in politics, due to Thompson's "effectiveness" and "broad support." Owing to the liberal nature of the district, the contest was not close, and Thompson defeated DeAguilera handily with 63% of the vote.

== 2016 Congressional campaign ==
In 2015, following court-mandated redistricting that created a new Democratic-leaning Congressional district based in Orlando, Thompson announced that she would run for Congress in the 10th district, challenging former Orlando Police Chief Val Demings and former Florida Democratic Party Chairman Bob Poe in the Democratic primary. Thompson came in second place, receiving 20% of the vote to Demings' 57%.

== 2018 Florida House campaign ==
In 2018, Thompson announced her intention to challenge incumbent Republican state representative Bobby Olszewski in House District 44, covering suburban southwestern Orange County. She went on to defeat Olszewski in the general election.

Florida House of Representatives' 44th district, 2018
Party	Candidate	Votes	%
Democratic	Geraldine Thompson	42,108	51.3
Republican	Bobby Olszewski (incumbent)	39,951	48.7
Total votes		82,059	100.0
Democratic gain from Republican			

== Challenge to Florida Supreme Court Justice ==
In 2020, Thompson filed a Petition for Quo Warranto in the Supreme Court of Florida, challenging Governor Ron DeSantis’s appointment of Renatha Francis to the Court. Although Thompson correctly identified the constitutional violations committed by the governor and the Supreme Court Judicial Nominating Commission, she unreasonably delayed bringing the petition and sought an incorrect remedy, resulting in the denial of the petition. She subsequently amended her petition seeking the correct remedy, and the Court granted it, ordering DeSantis to appoint someone else from the Judicial Nominating Commission's list. DeSantis subsequently appointed Jamie Grosshans.

== 2022 Election to the Florida Senate ==
In 2022, Thompson defeated fellow State Representative Kamia Brown to win election to the Florida Senate District 15 seat.

== Death ==
Thompson died from complications of knee surgery at a hospital in Orlando, Florida, on February 13, 2025, at the age of 76.
