= Kamia Brown =

American politician (born 1980)

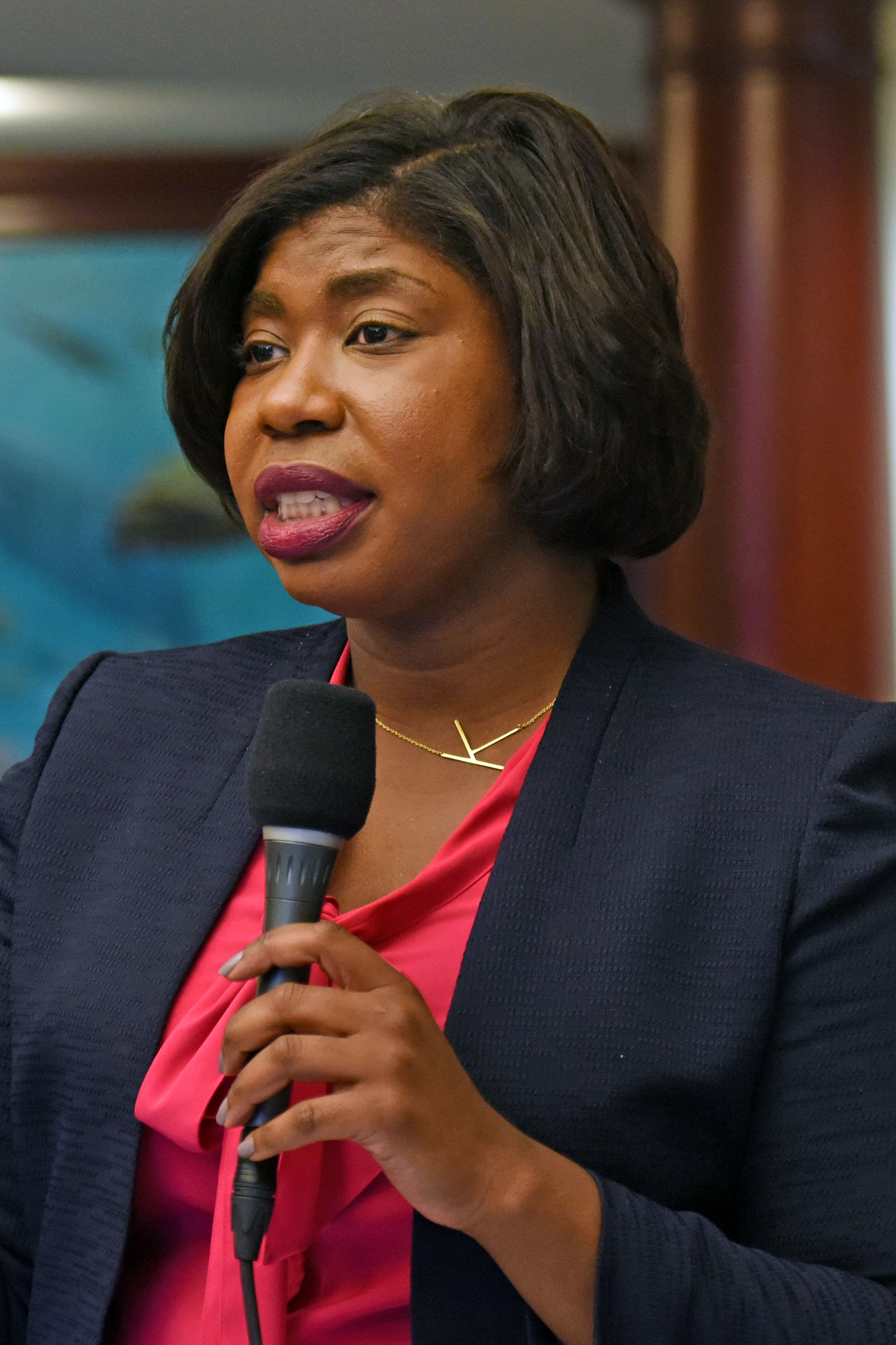

Member of the Florida House of Representatives from the 45th district
- In office November 8, 2016 – November 8, 2022
- Preceded by: Randolph Bracy
- Succeeded by: LaVon Bracy Davis

Personal details
- Born: October 24, 1980 (age 45) Orlando, Florida, U.S.
- Party: Democratic

Kamia Brown (born October 24, 1980) is an American politician who served as a member of the Florida House of Representatives for the 45th district from 2016 to 2022. Brown was an unsuccessful candidate for the Florida Senate in 2022.
