= Steve Precourt =

American politician

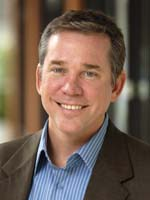

Member of the Florida House of Representatives
- In office November 7, 2006 – January 9, 2014
- Preceded by: Randy Johnson
- Succeeded by: Eric Eisnaugle
- Constituency: 41st District (2006–2012); 44th District (2012–2014)

Personal details
- Born: October 20, 1960 (age 65) Orlando, Florida
- Party: Republican
- Education: University of Florida (B.S.)
- Profession: Engineer

Stephen L. Precourt (born October 20, 1960) is an American politician. A member of the Republican Party, Precourt served in the Florida House of Representatives from 2006 to 2014, representing the 41st District from 2006 to 2012, and the 44th District from 2012 to 2014, when he resigned.

== History ==
Precourt attended the University of Florida, where he graduated with a degree in civil engineering in 1983. Following graduation, he worked as a transportation engineer in Central Florida, eventually becoming a principal at the Dyer, Riddle, Mills & Precourt. He served on the Orange County Development Advisory Board, including several years as its Chairman.

== Florida House of Representatives ==
When incumbent State Representative Randy Johnson was unable to seek re-election in 2006, Precourt ran in the Republican primary to succeed him in the 41st District, which included southeastern Lake County, western Orange County, and northwestern Osceola County. He faced Dennis Horton and Joe Durek in the primary, and the Orlando Sentinel, which endorsed Horton, criticized Precourt for sounding like a libertarian for his "wish to take a cleaver to all regulations save those involving the public's welfare." Ultimately, Precourt emerged victorious in the primary, defeating Horton and Durek with 50% of the vote. He advanced to the general election, where he encountered Bill McManus, the Democratic nominee and a former state legislator from Massachusetts. During the campaign, McManus attacked Precourt for violating campaign contribution laws, while Precourt criticized McManus for living outside the district. In the end, it was not a close race, and Precourt won his first term comfortably with 58% of the vote. He won re-election entirely unopposed in 2008. In 2010, he was opposed by Lee Douglas, the Democratic nominee, and Jon Foley, the Florida Tea Party nominee. The Sentinel endorsed his opponent, criticizing him for acting as an "eager proponent of the House's sometimes extreme agenda," specifically condemning him for stopping "a needed Republican-sponsored bill in the Senate that would have curbed scandalous behavior at the state's Public Service Commission."

In 2012, when the legislative districts were redrawn, Precourt was moved to the 44th District, which included much of the district that he had previously represented. He was entirely unopposed in the primary and the general elections, and won his final term in the legislature uncontested.

Following the resignation of Max Crumit, the Director of the Orlando-Orange County Expressway Authority, Precourt applied to fill the vacancy, despite the fact that he did not meet a requirement that "the new director should have run a toll-road system for eight years". Additionally, Precourt's appointment could potentially violate the state's ethics laws, as it is illegal for legislators to take a job "with another public agency." Despite this fact, the search committee responsible for replacing Crumit named him as one of six finalists for the job, and scheduled an interview with him on November 21, 2013. Precourt was offered the position by the Expressway Authority for a five year period, divided up by year-long contracts, and resigned from the legislature on January 9, 2014, in anticipation of accepting the position, but Ninth Circuit State Attorney Jeff Ashton, who was investigating the Authority, asked them to modify the offer. Instead, Precourt was offered a series of month-long contracts, and he withdrew his acceptance of the offer and blasted the Authority, declaring, "It is clear that the board has repudiated my agreement and terminated my employment effective immediately."
