= Florida's 40th House of Representatives district =

Florida district

Florida's 40th State House of Representatives district
Representative
| RaShon Young; D–Orlando |

Florida's 40th House of Representatives district elects one member of the Florida House of Representatives. It covers parts of Orange County.

== Members ==
- LaVon Bracy Davis (2022–2025)
- RaShon Young (since 2025)
