= Kelli Stargel =

American politician

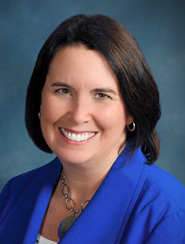

Member of the Florida Senate
- In office November 6, 2012 – November 8, 2022
- Preceded by: Paula Dockery
- Succeeded by: Joe Gruters
- Constituency: 15th district (2012–2016); 22nd district (2016–2022)

Member of the Florida House of Representatives from the 64th district
- In office November 4, 2008 – November 6, 2012
- Preceded by: Dennis Ross
- Succeeded by: Redistricted

Personal details
- Born: March 23, 1966 (age 60)
- Party: Republican
- Spouse: John K. Stargel
- Education: Tallahassee Community College

Kelli Stargel (born March 23, 1966) is an American politician who is a former Republican member of the Florida State Senate, representing the Lakeland area from 2012–2022. She has represented the 22nd district, encompassing northern Polk and southern Lake Counties, since 2016, after being redistricted from the 15th district. She previously served two terms in the Florida House of Representatives, representing northern Polk from 2008 to 2012.

Kelli Stargel defended her seat against Bob Doyel in the general election for Florida State Senate District 22 on November 6, 2018.

On May 16, 2022, she announced her candidacy for Florida's 15th congressional district. She lost to Laurel Lee in the Republican primary.

== History ==
Stargel was born in Tampa in 1966, and attended Land O' Lakes High School in Pasco County, graduating in 1984. She later attended Tallahassee Community College in 1991, though she did not graduate, and later worked as a property manager for her family's rental property. Stargel's family has a long history of involvement in the state's politics, with her great-great-great-grandfather, Aaron Jernigan (the namesake for Jernigan, the original name for Orlando), serving in the Florida House of Representatives briefly after statehood; her great-grandfather, James Lane, serving as the Sheriff of Sumter County from 1899 to 1911; and her husband, John K. Stargel, serving in the Florida House of Representatives from the 64th District from 2002 to 2006, and then as a Judge on the 10th Judicial Circuit.

== Florida House of Representatives ==
In 2008, when State Representative Dennis Ross was prevented seeking a fourth term due to term limits, Stargel ran to succeed him in the 64th District, which included Lakeland and Polk City in northern Polk County, which her husband had previously represented. She faced Jack English and Phillip Walker in the Republican primary, and campaigned on eliminating hundreds of exemptions to the state's sales tax and on solving education problems. The Ledger endorsed English over Stargel, however, criticizing her for a "troubling" list of campaign contributors that mostly consisted of donors who lived outside the district and praising English for his experience. Ultimately, Stargel beat out both English and Walker to win her party's nomination, receiving 52% of the vote to English's 27% and Walker's 21%. Advancing to the general election, she faced only write-in opposition and won with 99% of the vote. When Stargel ran for re-election in 2010, she faced Carol Castagnero, the Democratic nominee and a perennial candidate, but Castagnero did not prove to be a significant obstacle for her, and she won re-election in a landslide with 64% of the vote.

== Florida Senate ==
When the state's legislative districts were redrawn in 2012, Stargel opted to run for the Florida Senate in the 15th District rather than seek re-election. She faced Auburndale Mayor Jack Myers and Ron Rushing in the Republican primary, but defeated them handily, winning 63% of the vote to Myers's 22% and Rushing's 14%. In the general election, Stargel squared off with Stego Blue, the Democratic nominee and a United States Navy veteran. The Orlando Sentinel reluctantly endorsed Stargel, whom they called "another reliable vote for her party's agenda" over Blue due to his "[lack of] basic knowledge of state issues," noting, "Voters don't have a better option in this race." She ended up defeating Blue with ease, winning her first term in the Florida Senate with 58% of the vote.

During the 2014 legislative session, microbrewers lobbied the legislature to pass legislation to allow them to sell half-gallon containers of beer, which are illegal under state law. Stargel sponsored legislation that would have allowed the microbrewers to sell the half-gallon containers, but would "heavily redistrict the sale of virtually all craft beer sold by microbrewers" by requiring that they sell their product through a distributor. She remarked, "In states where beer is unregulated, the per capita production is significantly higher. Higher beer production and higher consumption go hand-in-hand. As a social conservative, this is why I believe we need to keep regulations on alcoholic beverages in place and not have unregulated beer widely available in the marketplace. Social issues greatly impact economic issues, and we must seek a balance on both."

Stargel's district was reconfigured and renumbered after court-ordered redistricting in 2016. She was elected in Florida's 22nd Senate district at the 2016 Florida Senate election.

Florida House of Representatives
Preceded by Dennis Ross	Member of the Florida House of Representatives from the 64th district 2008–2012	Succeeded by J. W. Grant
Florida Senate
Preceded by Paula Dockery	Member of the Florida Senate from the 15th district 2012–2016	Succeeded by Vic Torres
Preceded by Jeff Brandes	Member of the Florida Senate from the 22nd district 2016–present	Incumbent
