= Paula Dockery =

American politician

Paula B. Dockery
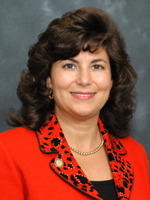

Member of the Florida Senate from the 15th district
- In office November 5, 2002 – November 6, 2012
- Preceded by: Bill Posey
- Succeeded by: Kelli Stargel

Member of the Florida House of Representatives from the 64th district
- In office November 5, 1996 – November 5, 2002
- Preceded by: Joe Tedder
- Succeeded by: John K. Stargel

Personal details
- Born: Paula Louise Bono; June 6, 1961 (age 65) Queens, New York, U.S.
- Party: Democratic Party (2017–present); Republican Party (until 2017)
- Spouses: Mark Fisher (m. 1985; div. 1988); C.C. (Doc) Dockery (m. 1989; died 2022)
- Education: University of Florida
- Profession: Insurance

Paula Dockery (born June 6, 1961) is an independent politician from the U.S. state of Florida. She served as a member of the Florida Senate for ten years, representing parts of Central Florida from 2002 to 2012 as a Republican. Previously, she served three terms in the Florida House of Representatives, representing a Lakeland-based district from 1996 until her election to the Senate. In January 2017, she left the Republican Party and became a Democrat.

== Early life ==
Dockery was born Paula Louise Bono in Queens, New York, on June 6, 1961. Her family moved to Florida in 1968, and she graduated from Coral Springs High School in 1979. She earned a Bachelor of Arts degree in political science from the University of Florida in 1983. While at UF, she was a member of Student Senate, served on the O'Connell Center Board of Managers, Chaired the Affairs & Ethics Committee, and was a graduate teaching assistant.

In 1985 she married Mark Fisher, an aide to United States Senator Lawton Chiles, a Democrat, and in 1986 the couple moved to Lakeland, Florida. She finished her Master of Arts degree in mass communications during 1987, divorced her first husband in 1988, and decided to become active in Republican politics. She was introduced to and married C.C. (Doc) Dockery, a Lakeland businessman and GOP fundraiser, in November 1989. The family business was citrus and cattle.

== State legislature ==
Dockery was elected to the Florida House of Representatives in 1996, and served three terms. She served as majority whip from 1998 through 2000, and was the primary sponsor of the popular Florida Forever Act.

In 2002, she ran for the Florida Senate, and was elected to a district encompassing northern Polk County and parts of surrounding Osceola, Lake, Sumter, and Hernando Counties. She served as Majority Whip from 2002 until 2004. Dockery chaired the Environmental Protection Committee and the Criminal Justice Committee. She was term limited in 2012 and could not run for re-election.

== 2010 gubernatorial campaign ==
On June 1, 2009, there was a draft campaign to see Senator Dockery run for Governor of Florida. On November 4, 2009, Dockery entered the race for Florida governor, challenging Florida's Attorney General Bill McCollum for the Republican Nomination. Dockery dropped out of the race when it became clear that she would be unable to run a competitive campaign against Rick Scott, who spent nearly $50 million of his own money to secure a bitterly fought Republican primary victory.

After Scott's primary win, Dockery's name was floated as a potential running mate for Scott. On 30 August 2010, Dockery announced that she would not run for lieutenant governor at Scott's side.

== Chronicle ==
Term limits prohibited Dockery from running for senate re-election in 2012, so when she was asked to write a column for the political discourse website Florida Voices to share her insights of Florida politics during her last year as a senator, she agreed.

== Honors and awards ==
Name of organization	Award	Year
American Cancer Society Florida	Legislative Award	2004
American Cancer Society Florida	Legislative Award	2007
Florida League of Cities	Legislative Appreciation Award	2007
Florida League of Cities	Legislator of the Year	1999
Coastal Conservation Association of Florida	Legislative Conservation Award	2001
Coastal Conservation Association of Florida	Legislative Conservation Award	2005
Coastal Conservation Association of Florida	Legislative Conservation Award	2006
Coastal Conservation Association of Florida	Legislative Conservation Award	2007
Florida Chamber of Commerce	Honor Roll	2006
Florida Chamber of Commerce	Honor Roll	2007
Green Horizon Land Trust	Blazing Star Award	2007
Sierra Club Florida Chapter	Environmental Legislator of the Year	2006
Florida Solar Energy Industries Association	Outstanding Dedication in Securing Florida's Energy Future	2006
Florida Chapter of REP America	Green Elephant Award	2006
Florida Catholic Conference	Defender of Life	2006
Governing Magazine	Public Official of the Year	2005
National Audubon Society Florida chapter	Teddy Roosevelt Award	2005
National Audubon Society Florida chapter	Legislator of the Year	2001
School District of Osceola County, Florida	Legislator of the Year Award	2005
Enterprise Florida	Legislative Champion Award	2005
Florida Local Environmental Resources Agencies	Environmental Leadership Award	2005
Florida Chiropractic Association	Legislator of the Year	2005
American Water Works Association, Florida	Legislator of the Year	2005
Florida Association of Counties	County Champion Award	2001
Florida Association of Counties	County Champion Award	2002
Florida Association of Counties	FAC County Champion	2005
Florida Chamber of Commerce	"A" Honor Roll	2002
Florida Chamber of Commerce	"A" Honor Roll	2004
Florida Chamber of Commerce	"A" Honor Roll	2005
Florida Ocean Alliance	Award of Appreciation	2005
Associated Builders and Contractors	Friend of Free Enterprise	2005
Florida Wildlife Federation	Conservation Legislator of the Year	2004
Florida Dental Hygiene Association	Senator of the Year Award	2004
Florida Ports Council	Tugboat Award	2004
South Florida Water Management District	Outstanding Leadership to Protect the Water Resources of South Florida	2004
Florida Trucking Association	Senate Legislator of the Year	2004
Sierra Club Florida Chapter	Certificate of Recognition	2004
The Ounce of Preservation Fund	Commitment to Florida's Children	2003
The Nature Conservancy	Leadership Award	2000
The Nature Conservancy	Forever Florida Leadership Award	2002
The Trust for Public Land	Legislative Leadership Award	2001
Central Florida Health Care	Community Shero	1998
Florida Chamber of Commerce	Top 40 Legislators	1998
Florida Chamber of Commerce	Top 40 Legislators	1999
Florida Chamber of Commerce	Top 40 Legislators	2000
Florida Chamber of Commerce	Top 40 Legislators	2001
Miami Herald	Most Powerful Legislators, #5 House Ranking	2001
Florida Parks and Recreation Association	Legislator of the Year	1999
Florida Parks and Recreation Association	Outstanding Legislator Award	2000
Florida Farm Bureau	Legislator of the Year	2000
Florida Cattlemen's Association	Legislator of the Year	2000
Florida Forestry Association	Legislator of the Year	2000
Lake Wales Ridge State Forest	"Paula Dockery Trail" Dedication	2000
Save Our Lakes of Central Florida	Outstanding Legislator Award	2000
Florida State Massage Therapy Association	Politician of the Year	2000
The Midwives Association of Florida	Legislator of the Year	1997
The Midwives Association of Florida	Outstanding Legislator of the Year	2000
The Nature Conservancy Florida Chapter	Public Service Award	1999
The Theodore Roosevelt Society	Teddy Award	1999
Florida Aquatic Plant Management Society	Plant Management Award	1999
American Advertising Federation	John Cummins Legislative Award	1999
Printing Association of Florida	Paul Revere Award	1999
Florida Petroleum Marketers & Convenience Store Ass'n	Outstanding Legislator	1999
University of Virginia, Darden Graduate School of Business Administration	Program for Emerging Political Leaders Selectee	1998
American Advertising Federation 4th District	Fall on the Sword Award	1998
National Federation of Independent Business	Guardian of Small Business	1998
Associated Industries of Florida	100% Voting Record for Business	1998
Christian Coalition of Florida	Friend of the Family	1997
Leadership Central Florida	Graduate	1996
Leadership Lakeland	Graduate	1993
Pi Rho Sigma Honor Society	Inducted	1986
Outstanding Young Women of America	Inducted	1985
