= Gary Siplin =

American politician (born 1954)

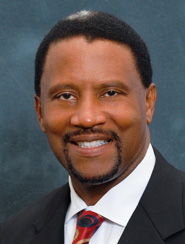

Member of the Florida Senate from the 19th district
- In office 2002–2012
- Preceded by: (redistricting)
- Succeeded by: Geraldine Thompson (redistricting)

Personal details
- Born: October 21, 1954 (age 71) Orlando, Florida
- Party: Democratic
- Spouse: Victoria Siplin
- Children: 4
- Profession: Attorney

Gary Anthony Siplin (born October 21, 1954) was a Democratic member of the Florida Senate, representing the 19th district from 2002 to 2012. He was previously a member of the Florida House of Representatives from 2000 to 2002.

== Early life and education ==
Siplin earned a B.A. in political science from Johnson C. Smith University, where he became a member of Omega Psi Phi fraternity. He then attended the University of Pittsburgh, earning an M.A. in Public and International Affairs. His juris doctor was earned at the Duquesne University School of Law.

== Career and conviction ==
In 2006, Siplin was charged in connection with allegations that a state employee had performed tasks related to his re-election campaign during regular work hours. A jury later found him guilty on one felony count of grand theft and one misdemeanor count of using the services of a public employee for political purposes.

On December 28, 2007, the Florida Fifth District Court of Appeal reversed his convictions and remanded the case to the trial court with directions that Siplin be acquitted of the felony charge, and that prosecutors be given permission to retry him on the misdemeanor charge.

Siplin ran for his Senate seat again in 2014, losing to incumbent Geraldine Thompson in the primary by a hair.

== Legislation ==
=== Sagging pants legislation ===
Siplin sponsored SB 228, the "droopy drawers" bill in 2011. The bill would require Florida public school districts to add a ban on sagging pants to their dress codes. This legislation was enacted by Governor Scott in May 2011.

=== In-state tuition for non-citizens ===
Siplin sponsored Florida's version of the DREAM Act. The act would allow for in-state tuition for undocumented students. The bill was killed in the Senate Judiciary Committee, by a vote of 4–3.

== Trayvon Martin ==
Siplin sponsored a letter to Governor Rick Scott proposing a special prosecutor to the Trayvon Martin case. The governor ultimately decided it was in the best interest of the community to do so.
