= LaVon Bracy Davis =

American politician

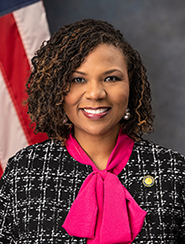

Member of the Florida Senate from the 15th district
- Incumbent
- Assumed office September 2, 2025
- Preceded by: Geraldine Thompson

Member of the Florida House of Representatives from the 40th district
- In office November 8, 2022 – September 1, 2025
- Preceded by: Kamia Brown
- Succeeded by: RaShon Young

Personal details
- Born: Rochester, New York, U.S.
- Party: Democratic
- Spouse: Adrian Davis
- Relations: Randolph Bracy (brother)
- Education: Howard University (BFA); Florida A&M University (JD)

LaVon Bracy Davis is an American attorney and politician who has served in Florida Senate representing the 15th district since 2025. She previously served as a member of the Florida House of Representatives from the 40th district from 2022 to 2025. She is the sister of former Florida state senator Randolph Bracy. She lives in Ocoee, Florida.

== Early life and education ==
Bracy was born in Rochester, New York. She earned a Bachelor of Fine Arts degree from Howard University and a Juris Doctor from the Florida A&M University College of Law.

== Career ==
Bracy served as a senior attorney for the Florida Department of Children and Families before joining the Dr. Phillips Center for the Performing Arts as director of community programming. She was elected to the Florida House of Representatives in November 2022.

Bracy Davis was elected to the Florida Senate in a September 2025 special election.
