= Elizabeth A. Coleman =

Elizabeth A. Coleman was appointed Inspector General for the Federal Reserve System on May 6, 2007. As Inspector General she leads the Office of Inspector General (OIG), responsible for promoting economy, efficiency, and effectiveness within the FED Board programs and operations. The responsibilities of the OIG also include the prevention and detection of waste, fraud, and abuse at the Board of Governors of the Federal Reserve System. The OIG is supposed to achieve its mandate through audits, evaluations, investigations, legislative reviews, while keeping the Chairman of the Board and Congress fully informed.

Coleman started at the OIG in 1989 as a senior auditor. In 1999 she was promoted to program manager, 2001 to senior program manager and 2004 to the official staff, as the Assistant Inspector General for Communications and Quality Assurance. She reportedly has worked closely with the Executive Council on Integrity and Efficiency, a professional organization of about thirty statutory Inspectors General who are appointed by their agency heads in certain designated federal entities, including the Board.

Prior to joining the board's staff, she was employed by the Government Accountability Office. Coleman has a BBA degree from James Madison University and is a graduate of the Stonier Graduate School of Banking, then hosted by Georgetown University. She also attended the Federal Reserve System’s Trailblazers Leadership Conference. Ms. Coleman is a Certified Information Systems Auditor.

During the Financial Services Subcommittee on Oversight and Investigations hearing of May 5 2009, Ms. Coleman did not answer several questions regarding trillions of dollars of "off-balance transactions" and "extension of credit" in the balance sheet of the Federal Reserve saying that she was conducting a "review" (and not an "investigation") "at a fairly high level" and not down to the specific "details". Videos of the Hearing has been going viral over the Internet since.
