= Tom Mims =

American politician (born 1963)

Member of the Florida House of Representatives from the 45th district
- In office November 8, 1988 – November 3, 1992
- Preceded by: Beverly Burnsed
- Succeeded by: Joe Tedder (redistricted)

Personal details
- Born: November 3, 1963 (age 62) Miami, Florida
- Party: Democratic
- Education: Polk Community College (A.A.); University of Florida (B.S.)
- Occupation: Developer, accountant

William Thomas Mims (born November 3, 1963) is a Democratic politician and developer from Florida who served as a member of the Florida House of Representatives from the 45th district from 1988 to 1992.

== Early life ==
Mims was born in Miami in 1963, and grew up in Polk County, where his father, Louie Mims, served as county sheriff. He attended Polk Community College, graduating with his associate degree in business administration, and then the University of Florida, receiving a bachelor's degree in accounting. After graduation, Mims returned to Lakeland, where he worked in real estate development.

== Florida House of Representatives ==
In 1988, State Representative Beverly Burnsed declined to run for re-election to the Florida House of Representatives, so Mims ran to succeed her in the 45th district, which included most of northern Polk County. In the Democratic primary, Mims faced former sheriff's detective T. C. Yon; David Bush, the owner of a trucking company; and attorney Jim Tanner. Mims placed first in the primary, winning 44 percent of the vote, and proceeded to a runoff with Bush, who placed second with 22 percent.

Mims won the runoff by a wide margin, receiving 63 percent of the vote to Bush's 37 percent, and faced Republican John Reaves, a former football player, in the general election. Following a closely watched campaign, Mims defeated Reaves by a narrow margin, receiving 52 percent of the vote to his 48 percent.

In 1990, Mims ran for re-election and won unopposed.

== 1992 campaign for Congress ==
Following the 1990 census, Mims ran for Congress from the redrawn 12th district, which was centered in Polk County. He won the Democratic primary over Lakeland Mayor Frank O'Reilly by a wide margin, and advanced to the general election, where he faced State Senator Charles Canady, the Republican nominee. Following a close campaign, Canady defeated Mims, winning 52 percent of the vote to Mims's 48 percent.

== 1998 State Senate campaign ==
In 1998, State Senator Rick Dantzler, a Democrat, resigned from the State Senate to focus on his campaign for governor. Governor Lawton Chiles scheduled a special election to fill Dantzler's seat in the 17th district for March 10, 1998, and Mims ran to succeed Dantzler. Mims won the Democratic nomination unopposed, and faced Republican State Representative John Laurent and Libertarian Carl Strang, the former mayor of Winter Haven, in the general election. Both parties invested in the race, which was seen as an "important indicator[]" of the fall general elections. Laurent ultimately won the election by a wide margin, receiving 53 percent of the vote to Mims's 37 percent and Strang's 10 percent.
