= List of Eastern Florida State College people =

This list contains people associated with the Eastern Florida State College, or formerly the Brevard Community College in Brevard County, Florida, including current and former college presidents, as well as notable alumni and faculty.

== Alumni ==
Alumni	Notability
Eli Abaev	American-Israeli basketball player for Hapoel Be'er Sheva in the Israeli Basketball Premier League
Thad Altman	Current Florida state representative; former Florida state senator; former Brevard County commissioner
Paul Azinger	PGA Tour golfer, 1993 PGA Championship winner
Bruce Bochy	Major League Baseball manager
Warren Bolster	Sport photographer, published by Skateboarder magazine and Surfer Magazine
Steve Crisafulli	Current member of the Florida House of Representatives
Shaheed Davis	Professional basketball player
Harold Fox	Former NBA 15th overall draft pick in 1972; drafted and played for Buffalo Braves
Tom Goodson	Former member of the Florida House of Representatives 29th, 50th, and 51st districts
Darrell Hammond	Actor/comedian and cast member for Saturday Night Live, 1995–2009
Curtez Kellman	Guyanese international soccer player, 2019–2020
Patsy Ann Kurth	Former member of Florida Senate representing the 16th District 1990–1992
Pete Marino	Former Major League Soccer player
Danny McKnight	Retired colonel in the Army; commander of the 3rd Battalion, 75th Ranger Regiment in the Battle of Mogadishu
Danilo Orsi	Professional soccer player, 2016–2018
Bill Posey	1969 graduate; United States representative from Florida
Scott Rigell	Businessman and former U.S. representative for Virginia's 2nd congressional district 2011–2017
Carlos Reyes	Major League Baseball player (1994–2003)
Mandy Romero	Major League Baseball player (1997–2003) for San Diego Padres, Boston Red Sox and Colorado Rockies
Derrick Sharp	American-Israeli professional basketball player; at the college, was named the Florida Community College Activities Association (FCCAA) State Junior College Player of the Year.
John Tobia	State representative of 31st (2008–12) and 53rd (2012–2016) districts
Daniel Tosh	Comedian and host of Comedy Central's Tosh.0; attended for one semester before transferring to the University of Central Florida
Brandon Webb	Former Navy SEAL sniper course head instructor; founder and CEO of Crate Club, author; attended online classes while in the Navy
Herbert Wertheim	Optometric physician, inventor, and philanthropist
Billy Williams	Former NBA shooting guard, 1980 draft pick selected 43rd overall by the Houston Rockets
Don Wilson	Martial artist and actor; 11-time professional Kickboxing World Champion who scored 47 knockouts in four decades
Lori Wilson	Independent politician and Florida State Senate member

== Notable faculty and staff ==
- Gaëtan Brulotte, Canadian writer
- Lela E. Buis, US writer, poet and painter
- Patrick D. Smith, US novelist

=== Presidents ===
1. J. Bruce Wilson, 1960–1966
2. Leo C. Muller, 1966–1968
3. Maxwell King, 1968–1998
4. Michael Kaliszeski (interim), 1998
5. Thomas E. Gamble, 1999–2006
6. Jim Drake, 2006–2011
7. Jim Richey, 2011–present
