= Patricia Grogan =

American politician (born 1962)

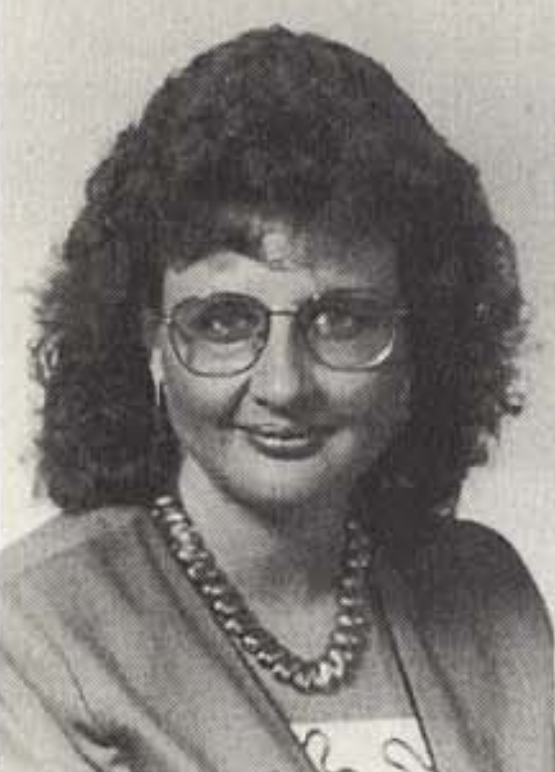

Member of the Florida Senate from the 18th district
- In office November 3, 1992 – November 8, 1994
- Preceded by: Jeanne Malchon (redistricting)
- Succeeded by: Charles Bronson

Personal details
- Born: September 11, 1962 (age 64) Dover, New Jersey
- Party: Democratic
- Spouse: David Week
- Education: American University (B.A.); University of Central Florida (M.P.A.)

Patricia Grogan (born September 11, 1962) is a Democratic politician from Florida who served as a member of the Florida Senate from the 18th district from 1992 to 1994.

== Early life ==
Grogan was born in Dover, New Jersey, in 1962, and moved to Florida in 1963. She attended American University, graduating with her bachelor's degree in 1984, and the University of Central Florida, receiving her masters of public administration in 1990. Grogan worked as a legislative aide to State Representative Harry Goode from 1986 to 1992.

== Florida Senate ==
In 1992, following redistricting, Democratic State Senator Winston Gardner Jr. declined to seek re-election. After several prominent Democrats, including state representatives Charlie Roberts and Dixie Sansom, declined to run, Grogan ran to succeed Gardner in the newly drawn 18th district, which included Brevard and Osceola counties. She faced attorney Bob Nabors in the Democratic primary, and defeated him by a wide margin, winning 64 percent of the vote to his 36 percent. In the general election, she faced Republican Bob Allen, a businessman, in the general election. Grogan narrowly defeated Allen in the general election, winning 53 percent of the vote to his 47 percent.

Grogan ran for re-election in 1994, and was challenged by Charles Bronson, the chairman of the Brevard County Republican Party and a rancher. Grogan campaigned on her record in the legislature, and attacked Bronson as "an anti-choice extremist" who "helped radical right extremists take over the Brevard Republican Party." She ultimately lost to Bronson, winning 47 percent of the vote to his 53 percent.

== Post-legislative career ==
After leaving the legislature, Grogan was appointed to the Florida Parole Commission by Governor Lawton Chiles in 1995, but her position was eliminated the following year when the state legislature cut funding to the commission.
