= Haridopolos =

Haridopolos is a surname. Notable people with the surname include:

- Mike Haridopolos (born 1970), American politician, lobbyist and former educator
- Stephanie Haridopolos (born 1972/1973), American physician and public health official
