= Clark Maxwell Jr. =

American politician (1934–2011)

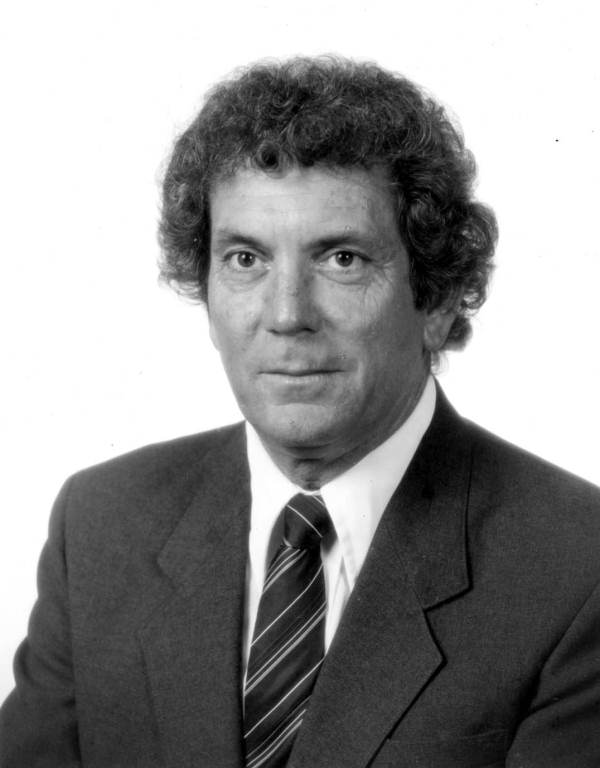

Member of the Florida Senate from the 16th district
- In office November 7, 1978 – March 11, 1984
- Preceded by: Lori Wilson
- Succeeded by: Tim Deratany

Member of the Florida House of Representatives from the 45th district
- In office November 5, 1974 – November 7, 1978
- Preceded by: F. Eugene Tubbs
- Succeeded by: Winston Gardner Jr.

Personal details
- Born: August 21, 1934 St. Petersburg, Florida
- Died: January 18, 2011 (aged 76) Palm Coast, Florida
- Party: Republican
- Spouse: Diane Oettinger
- Children: 3
- Education: Florida Southern College (B.S.)
- Occupation: Management consultant

Military service
- Allegiance: United States
- Branch/service: United States Army

Clark Maxwell Jr. (August 21, 1934 – January 18, 2011) was an American politician from Florida. A member of the Republican Party, he served in the Florida House of Representatives from 1974 to 1978 and in the Florida Senate from 1978 to 1984.

== Life and career ==
Maxwell was born in St. Petersburg, Florida. He attended Florida Southern College and served in the United States Army.

In 1974, Maxwell was elected to represent the 45th district of the Florida House of Representatives, succeeding F. Eugene Tubbs. He served until 1978, when he was succeeded by Winston Gardner Jr. In the same year, he was elected to represent the 16th district of the Florida Senate, succeeding Lori Wilson. He resigned in 1984 and was succeeded by Tim Deratany.

Maxwell died on January 18, 2011 at his home in Palm Coast, Florida, at the age of 76.
