= Florida's 17th Senate district =

American legislative district

Florida's 17th State Senate district
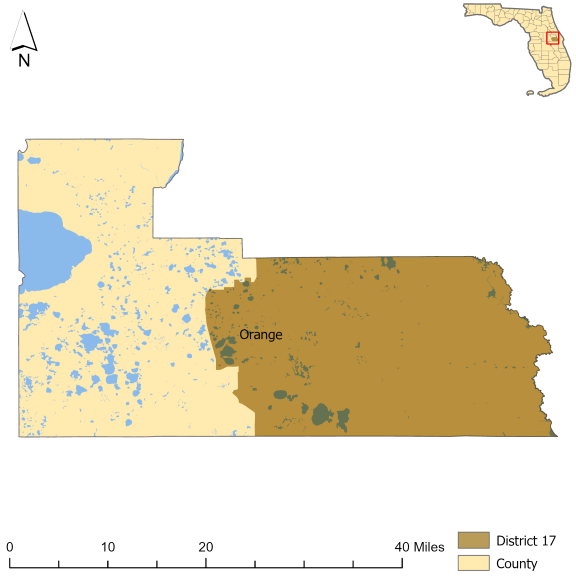
Senator
Carlos Smith; D–Orlando
- Demographics: 41% White; 9% Black; 41% Hispanic; 5% Asian; 3% Other
- Population (2023): 539,848

Florida's 17th Senate district elects one member of the Florida Senate. The district consists of parts of Orange County, East of Interstate 4, in the U.S. state of Florida. The current senator is Democrat Carlos Smith.

== List of senators ==
Full list of senators from the 17th district (1845–2006).

Portrait	Name	Party	Years of service	Home city/state	Notes
	George Rainsford Fairbanks		1846–1848	Watertown, New York	Consisted of Nassau County
	William A. Forward	Democratic	1848–1850	New York	Consisted of St. Johns County
	J. B. Johnson	Democratic	1907–1923	Live Oak, Florida	Consisted of Suwannee County
	J. Graham Black	Democratic	1953–1955	Bamberg, South Carolina	
	Robert Elrod	Republican	1964–1968	Henryville, Indiana	Consisted of Orange County
	John L. Ducker	Republican	1968–1972	Fort Thomas, Kentucky	Consisted of Orange County
	John Vogt	Democratic	1972–1988	Lake Wales, Florida	Consisted of Brevard County
	Winston Gardner Jr.	Democratic	1988–1992	Montgomery, Alabama	Consisted of Brevard County
	Rick Dantzler	Democratic	1992–1998	Fort Leonard Wood, Missouri	Redistricted from the 13th district; Consisted of Polk County
	John Laurent	Republican	1998–2002	Bartow, Florida	Consisted of parts of Highlands, Okeechobee, and Polk counties
	J. D. Alexander	Republican	2002–2012	Camp Lejeune, North Carolina	Redistricted; Consisted of all of Hardee and Highlands and parts of DeSoto, Glades, Okeechobee, Polk, and St. Lucie counties
	John Legg	Republican	2012–2016	Brooksville, Florida	Redistricted from the 12th district; Consisted of northwestern parts Hillsborough County and the southern portion of Pasco County
	Debbie Mayfield	Republican	2016–2022	Pensacola, Florida	Redistricted from the 16th district; Consisted of parts of Brevard and Indian River counties
	Linda Stewart	Democratic	2022–2024	Johnstown, Pennsylvania	Redistricted from the 13th district; Consisted of Orange County East of I-4
	Carlos Smith	Democratic	2024–present	Fort Lauderdale, Florida	Consists of Orange County East of I-4

== Elections ==
=== 2020 ===
2020 Florida's 17th senate district election
Party	Candidate	Votes	%
Republican	Debbie Mayfield	193,560	60.6%
Democratic	Scot Fretwell	114,515	35.9%
Independent	Phillip Snyder	11,323	3.5%
Total votes		319,398	100%
Republican hold			

=== 2022 ===
2022 Florida's 17th senate district election
Party	Candidate	Votes	%
Democratic	Linda Stewart (incumbent)	85,689	56.06
Republican	Steve Dixon	67,170	43.94
Total votes		152,859	100%
Democratic hold			

=== 2024 ===
2024 Florida's 17th senate district election
Party	Candidate	Votes	%
Democratic	Carlos Guillermo Smith	Unopposed	
Total votes		N/A	100.0
Democratic hold			
