= Tim Deratany =

American politician (born 1939)

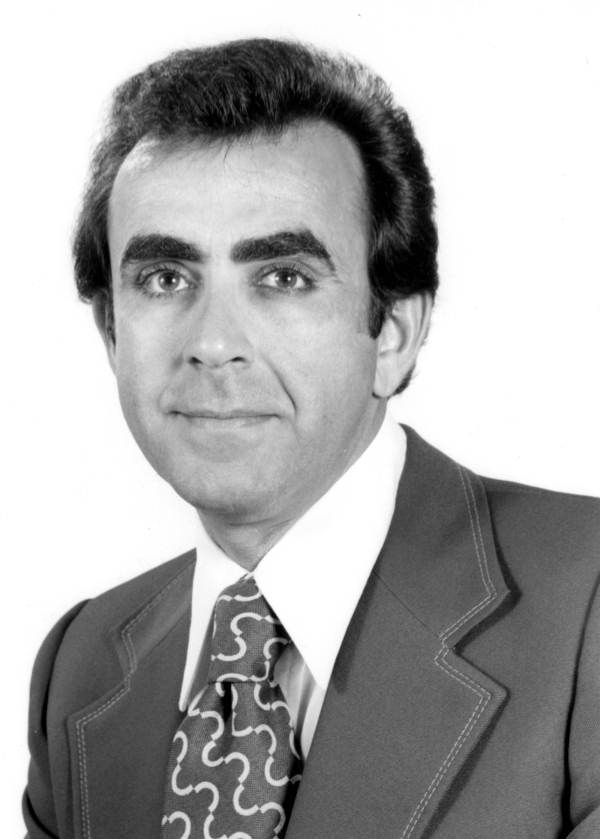

Member of the Florida Senate from the 16th district
- In office April 10, 1984 – November 6, 1990
- Preceded by: Clark Maxwell Jr.
- Succeeded by: Patsy Ann Kurth

Member of the Florida House of Representatives
- In office November 7, 1978 – April 10, 1984
- Preceded by: Bill Nelson
- Succeeded by: Dixie Sansom
- Constituency: 47th district (1978–1982); 32nd district (1982–1984)

Personal details
- Born: October 19, 1939 (age 86) Detroit, Michigan
- Party: Republican
- Spouse: Andrea Green
- Children: 2
- Education: Brevard Community College; Eckerd College (B.A.)
- Occupation: Investor

Tim Deratany (born October 19, 1939) is a Republican politician from Florida who served as a member of the Florida House of Representatives from 1978 to 1984 and as a member of the Florida Senate from the 16th district from 1984 to 1990.

== Early life ==
Deratany was born in Michigan and came to Florida in 1947. He is a businessman. He served in the Florida House of Representatives for the 47th district from 1978 to 1984, as a Republican. He also served in the Florida State Senate from 1984 to 1990. He was the first Republican Chairman of the Senate Finance and Tax Committee since reconstruction. Deratany had served as the mayor of the Town of Indialantic from 1970 to 1977. He has been a member of the Florida Council on Arts and Culture since 2010, having been appointed by Governor Charlie Crist.
