= King Center =

King Center may refer to:

- Martin Luther King Jr. National Historical Park, Atlanta, Georgia
  - King Center for Nonviolent Social Change
- King Center for the Performing Arts, Melbourne, Florida
