= Lori Wilson (Florida politician) =

American lawyer and politician (1937–2019)

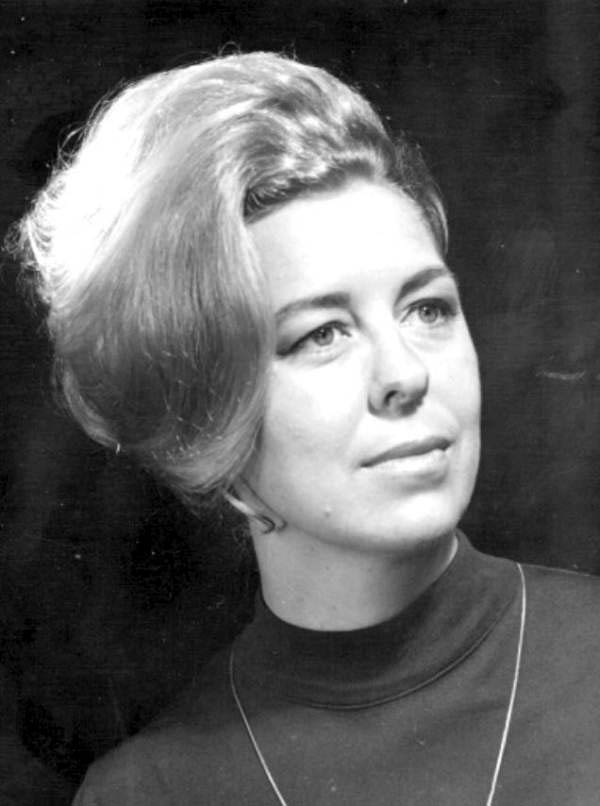

Member of the Florida Senate from the 16th district
- In office 1972–1978
- Preceded by: Kenneth Plante
- Succeeded by: Clark Maxwell Jr.

Personal details
- Born: February 15, 1937 Waynesville, North Carolina
- Died: January 30, 2019 (aged 81) Indian Harbour Beach, Florida
- Party: Independent
- Spouse: Al Neuharth (m. 1973; div. 1982)
- Children: 4
- Education: Tennessee Tech University; Rollins College; Brevard Community College; Florida State University College of Law
- Occupation: Lawyer

Lori Wilson (February 15, 1937 – January 30, 2019) was an American lawyer and politician in the state of Florida.

Wilson was born in Waynesville, North Carolina and came to Florida in 1960. She was part Cherokee. She attended Tennessee Tech University, Rollins College and Brevard Community College. Wilson lived in Cocoa Beach, Florida. She was an honorary director of the Central Florida Zoological Society and legislative director of the Florida Injured Wildlife Sanctuary. She was also associated with the University of Florida Foundation. Wilson served on the Brevard County Commission. She served in the Florida State Senate from 1973 to 1978, as an Independent member (16th district).

In her time in public service, Wilson fought to remove all pay toilets in Florida and fought for the passage of a law to protect endangered Florida manatees. Wilson also worked to clean up an unofficial city dump in Cocoa Beach, which was then turned into a city park—named Lori Wilson Park by a unanimous vote.

Wilson went to the Florida State University College of Law and was admitted to the Florida bar in 1984. In 1988, Wilson sought to return to the Florida State Senate, but was narrowly defeated by Democratic state Representative Winston Gardner

Wilson died at her daughter's Indian Harbour Beach, Florida home on January 30, 2019, 2 1/2 weeks before her 82nd birthday, following a lengthy illness.
