= Patsy Ann Kurth =

American politician

Patsy Ann Gephardt Kurth

Member of the Florida Senate

Member of the U.S. House of Representatives from Florida
- In office November 6, 1990 – 1992
- Preceded by: Timothy Deratany
- Succeeded by: Bill Posey
- Constituency: 16th district (1990–1992); 15th district (1992–2000)

Personal details
- Born: February 2, 1941 Washington, Missouri, U.S.
- Died: April 27, 2011 (aged 70) Holmes Medical Center, Melbourne, Florida, U.S.
- Party: Democratic
- Spouse: Alan Fredrick Kurth
- Children: Martha Harbin, Dawn Ann Kurth (1961-1986), Wendy Silver, Sara Diaz
- Education: Southwest Missouri State Teachers College, Brevard Community College
- Profession: Realtor

Patsy Ann Gephardt Kurth (February 2, 1941 – April 27, 2011) was a member of the Florida Senate representing the 16th district from 1990 to 1992 and the 15th district from 1992 to 2000.

She was born in Washington, Missouri on February 2, 1941, and came to Brevard County in 1962.

In 2000, she ran for a seat in the U.S House of Representatives representing Florida's 15th congressional district but was defeated by Dave Weldon.

She was the cousin of Richard Gephardt.

Her daughter, Dawn Ann Kurth, as a 11-year-old, was a spokesperson against false advertising directed toward children during the early 1970s. Dawn died from Hodgkin’s lymphoma in 1986.

Political offices
| Preceded by Timothy Deratany | Member of the Florida Senate from the 16th district 1990–1992 | Succeeded by Wallace Lockwood Burt |
| Preceded by Toni Jennings | Member of the Florida Senate from the 15th district 1992–2000 | Succeeded by Bill Posey |
