= Dixie Sansom =

American politician (born 1948)

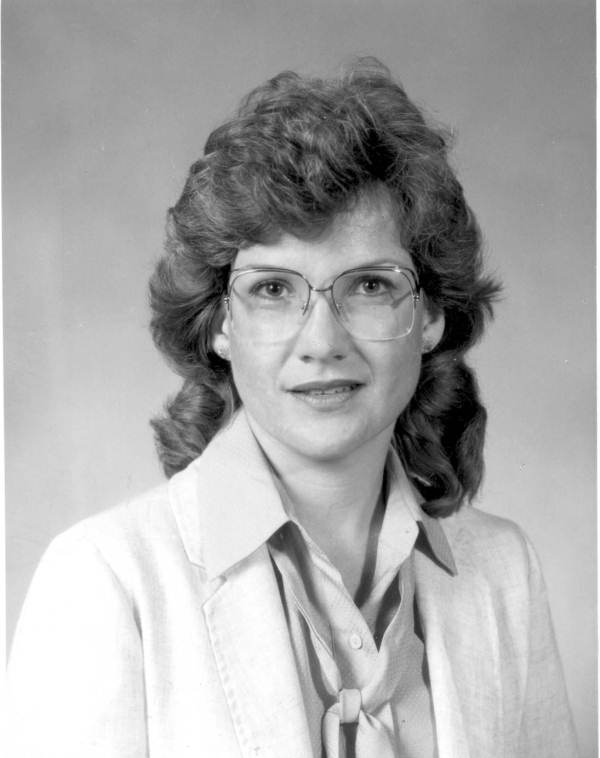

Member of the Florida House of Representatives from the 32nd district
- In office April 10, 1984 – November 3, 1992
- Preceded by: Tim Deratany
- Succeeded by: Howard Futch (redistricting)

Personal details
- Born: December 6, 1948 (age 77) Fort Leavenworth, Kansas
- Party: Republican
- Spouse: Jerry Sansom
- Education: Pensacola Junior College; University of West Florida; Brevard Junior College

Dixie Newtom Sansom (born December 6, 1948) is a Republican politician from Florida who served as a member of the Florida House of Representatives from the 32nd district from 1984 to 1992. She ran for the United States House of Representatives in 1992 to represent Florida's 15th district, although she lost in the Republican primary. She later worked as executive director of the Medical Society of Brevard County, director of communications for the Division of Community Colleges and director of governmental relations and public affairs for the Canaveral Port Authority. She founded The Sansom Group/Dixie Sansom Government Relations Consulting in 2006.

== Early life ==
Sansom was born in Fort Leavenworth, Kansas in 1948, the daughter of a newspaper librarian. Her cousin is fellow Florida legislator Ray Sansom. She studied at Pensacola Junior College and the University of West Florida before moving from Pensacola to Brevard County, Florida, in 1969, shortly after her marriage to Jerry Sansom. Her husband spent most of his career as executive director for the Organized Fishermen of Florida. Sansom began her career as a clerk at Creel Elementary School in Melbourne, Florida. She then worked as a reporter for the Miami Herald and the Melbourne Times. In the 1970s, her husband decided to study at Florida State University and Sansom began asking around about jobs in Tallahassee, which was how she was hired as a press aide for the politician Clark Maxwell Jr., a position that she held for 10 years.

== Political career ==
A Republican, Sansom was elected to the Florida House of Representatives for the 32nd district in the April 1984 special election, after the former representative Tim Deratany resigned to run for a seat in the Florida Senate. She was focused on beach restoration and vocational education. She led the effort to pass legislation to stop sewage systems from discharging into the Indian River Lagoon and obtaining funding for The Haven for Children. In the 1990 general election, she beat the Democrat Gene Newberry to retain her seat, receiving 67.4% of the vote. Sansom served as a Republican floor leader.

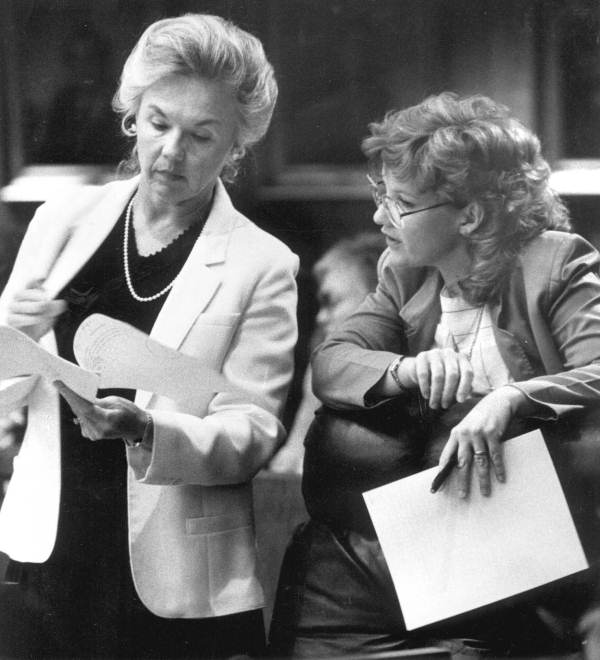
Sansom and fellow legislator Marilyn Evans-Jones in 1985

In 1992, Sansom ran for the United States House of Representatives to represent Florida's 15th district, a seat held by the Democrat Jim Bacchus. She lost in the Republican primary on September 1, 1992, to Bill Tolley, receiving 46% of the vote, while Tolley received 54% of the vote. During the primary campaign, she was criticized for her pro-choice position on abortion and Tolley argued that she should not have used a photo of her and fellow state legislator Marilyn Evans-Jones in her campaign, as it implied that Evans-Jones had endorsed her.

After losing the election, Sansom first worked as the executive director of the Medical Society of Brevard County and then as the director of communications for the Division of Community Colleges. She then joined the Canaveral Port Authority as the director of governmental relations and public affairs. In 2006, she founded the consulting firm The Sansom Group/Dixie Sansom Government Relations Consulting.
