= Andrew Zenas Adkins =

Florida politician

Andrew Zenas Adkins (16 March 1877 - 1953) was a judge and state legislator in Florida. Adkins was born in Bradford County and studied law at Cumberland University, Tennessee. He served several terms in the Florida Senate, gaining election for the Sixteenth district in May 1908, defeating A. D, Andrews. He represented Bradford County, Florida. He also served as mayor of Starke, Florida for two terms, spanning 1907-8.

He appears in a composite of photographs of 1915 Florida state senators.
