= Charles Bronson (disambiguation) =

Charles Bronson (1921–2003) was an American actor.

Charles Bronson may also refer to:

- Charles Bronson (politician) (born 1949), Florida Commissioner of Agriculture from 2001 to 2011
- Charles Bronson (prisoner) (Michael Peterson, born 1952), British criminal
- Charles Bronson (band), American hardcore punk band
- Charles Leslie Bronson (1918–1995), photographer at the assassination of John F. Kennedy
