= Denise Hinton =

American nurse

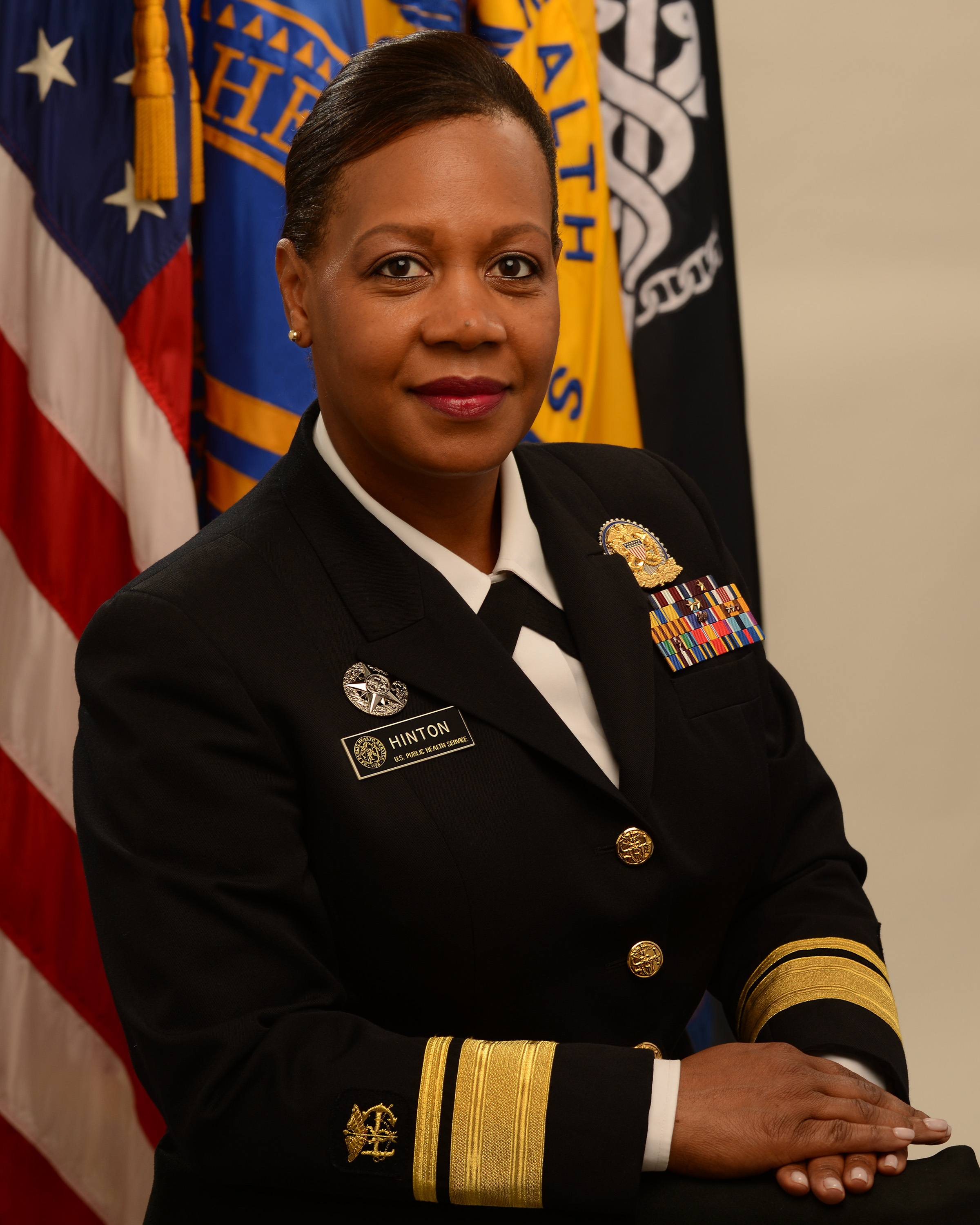
- Official portrait, 2021

Acting Surgeon General of the United States
- In office January 20, 2025 – September 29, 2025
- President: Donald Trump
- Preceded by: Vivek Murthy
- Succeeded by: Stephanie Haridopolos (acting)

Deputy Surgeon General of the United States
- In office October 2021 – September 29, 2025
- President: Joe Biden
- Preceded by: Erica Schwartz
- Succeeded by: Paul Jung

Personal details
- Education: Florida State University (BS); Boston University (MS)

Military service
- Branch/service: United States Air Force (formerly); USPHS Commissioned Corps
- Years of service: 1990s (Air Force); 2002–2025 (Public Health Service)
- Rank: Rear Admiral

Denise Hinton is an American nurse and retired U.S. Public Health Service Commissioned Corps rear admiral who last served as the deputy surgeon general of the United States from October 2021 to September 2025. She also served as the acting surgeon general of the United States from January 20, 2025 to September 29, 2025. Prior to that, she was the chief scientist of the Food and Drug Administration from 2017 to 2021.

== Life and career ==
Denise Hinton was raised in a military family. She earned her B.S. in nursing from Florida State University and a M.S. from Boston University. She is a fellow of the American Academy of Nursing.

Hinton joined the United States Air Force Nurse Corps in the 1990s as a nurse officer. Hinton joined the U.S. Public Health Service Commissioned Corps, working at the Food and Drug Administration (FDA) in 2002 in the Center for Drug Evaluation and Research (CDER) division of cardiovascular and renal products and, later, served in the center's former division of training and development. Hinton held various leadership positions within the FDA, including deputy director of the CDER Office of Medical Policy (OMP). She concurrently served as the acting OMP Director from 2014 to 2016. From July 2017 to October 2021, Hinton served as the chief scientist of the FDA. In December 2020, as the FDA’s chief scientist, Hinton authorized the emergency use of the Pfizer-BioNTech COVID-19 vaccine, a major step in the response to the COVID-19 pandemic." Hinton has earned numerous awards throughout her career, including a USPHS Meritorious Service Medal, the American Public Health Association Presidential Citation, and an FDA's Commissioner Special Citation.

Military offices
Preceded by Vivek Murthy	Surgeon General of the United States; Acting; 2025	Succeeded by Stephanie Haridopolos; Acting
