= Carolina Amesty =

American politician and businesswoman (born 1994)

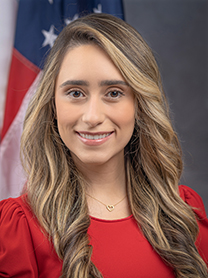

Member of the Florida House of Representatives from the 45th district
- In office November 8, 2022 – November 5, 2024
- Preceded by: Geraldine Thompson (redistricting)
- Succeeded by: Leonard Spencer

Personal details
- Born: Carolina Dinorah Amesty; November 4, 1994 (age 31) Caracas, Venezuela
- Party: Republican
- Spouse: Jay Rosario (m. 2025)
- Education: Seminole State College of Florida (AA); University of Central Florida (BA); University of Miami (MBA)

Carolina Dinorah Amesty (born November 4, 1994) is an American politician who served as a member of the Florida House of Representatives for Florida's 45th District from November 2022 to November 2024. Amesty focused her policies on taxes, health care, education, veterans' affairs, and the tourism industry.

Amesty took office on November 8, 2022, after winning the Republican primaries with 45% of the votes in a race among five candidates, where her main opponent was Allie Braswell. However, in the November 2024 general election, she faced a closely contested race against Leonard Spencer, who prevailed with 50.8% of the votes compared to Amesty's 49.2%.

== Education ==
Amesty was born in Venezuela on November 4, 1994. She graduated high school from West Oaks Academy. Amesty earned an Associate of Arts from Seminole State College and Bachelor of Arts in Political Science and Pre Law from the University of Central Florida. Graduate studies in Business Administration from the University of Miami.

In 2014, she received a scholarship funded by the U.S. Department of State and American Council of Teachers of Russian to travel to Eurasia and learn the Russian language.

== Career ==
In 2014 and 2015, Amesty worked as the director of academic affairs at Central Christian University, which is owned and operated by her father, Pastor Juan Carlos Amesty. Amesty returned to Central Christian University in 2017, working as senior advisor to the president and executive vice president.

== Florida House of Representatives ==
Amesty served as a representative in the Florida House of Representatives for District 45 from November 2022 to November 2024. Her candidacy was endorsed by Donald Trump Jr.

During Florida Governor Ron DeSantis's feud with Disney in 2023, Amesty said that Disney was "indoctrinating" children with "radical gender ideologies" and had "pushed far-left narratives and lies about our great state". She sponsored several bills, including HB 461, which exempts women who have recently given birth from certain jury service under specific conditions. She also introduced a bill to provide property tax exemptions for veterans, which was incorporated into Florida's tax package and later signed by the governor. She also supported legislation to ban the use of TikTok on government devices, explaining that the measure aims to mitigate foreign risks. Additionally, she backed a law raising the minimum age requirement for employment in the strip club industry as part of efforts to protect young women from human trafficking. Amesty stated that this initiative was intended to give young women opportunities to pursue safe careers, access education, and lead family lives free from the threat of exploitation.

In early 2022, she expressed her support for President Trump's potential presidential comeback in 2024. Amesty ran for re-election in 2024. During the election, she was challenged by former Disney executive Leonard Spencer, who defeated her by securing 50.85% of the vote. She was the only Republican legislator in the Florida House to lose their re-election in 2024.

== Legal challenges ==
=== 2024 forgery charges ===
In May 2024, an investigation by the office of Governor Ron DeSantis was opened into whether Amesty, a notary public, had notarized a document with a forged signature. At the time on the board of Central Christian University, a small unaccredited school in Florida, Amesty was alleged to have notarized a document certifying employment of a professor. The form may have helped the school receive licensing. The professor denied signing the document or ever working at the school. Handwriting experts analyzing the signature agreed the professor did not sign the form and that it resembled Amesty's writing. Through her attorney, Amesty reaffirmed that she had seen the man sign the form.

Amesty was indicted by the state government of Florida on August 28, 2024, on four charges of forgery, uttering a forgery, false acknowledgment or certification by a notary public and notarizing her own signature, all third-degree felonies each punishable by up to five years in prison. At the time a candidate for re-election to the House of Representatives, Amesty declared herself innocent of the accusations and described them as part of a defamation campaign aimed at damaging her candidacy. Amesty said the main purpose of this campaign was to prevent her re-election by tarnishing her public image.

Charges were dropped in December 2024, after Amesty completed a financial crimes course, a financial literacy course and 30 hours of community service.

=== 2025 Economic Injury Disaster Loan program fraud criminal complaint ===
In January 2025, an investigation by the United States Small Business Administration Office of Inspector General brought a criminal complaint against Amesty in the United States District Court for the Middle District of Florida for two violations of theft of government property. In the complaint it was alleged that Amesty embezzled $122,000 of COVID-19 Economic Injury Disaster Loan program though the Carolina Amesty Foundation Inc. and Dinocar Auto Sales LLC. The criminal complaint noted that out of fifteen loan applications associated with Amesty, seven were failed attempts. The organizations associated with Amnesty received more than $500,000 in loans. The complaint also alleged that Amesty misrepresented information including gross revenues, the amount of employees and if the business were even incorporated.

The charges were dismissed following an August 6, 2025, motion filed by U.S. Attorney Gregory Kehoe. Amesty had retained Brad Bondi, the brother of attorney general Pam Bondi, as her lawyer. In response to concerns about potential impropriety concerning the dismissal, a Department of Justice spokesperson stated that "This decision was made through proper channels and the Attorney General had no role in it".

== Personal life ==
Amesty is a Christian. She has recreational interests in playing piano, reading, and traveling.

Amesty married Jay Rosario in December 2025.
