= Mike Haridopolos =

American politician (born 1970)

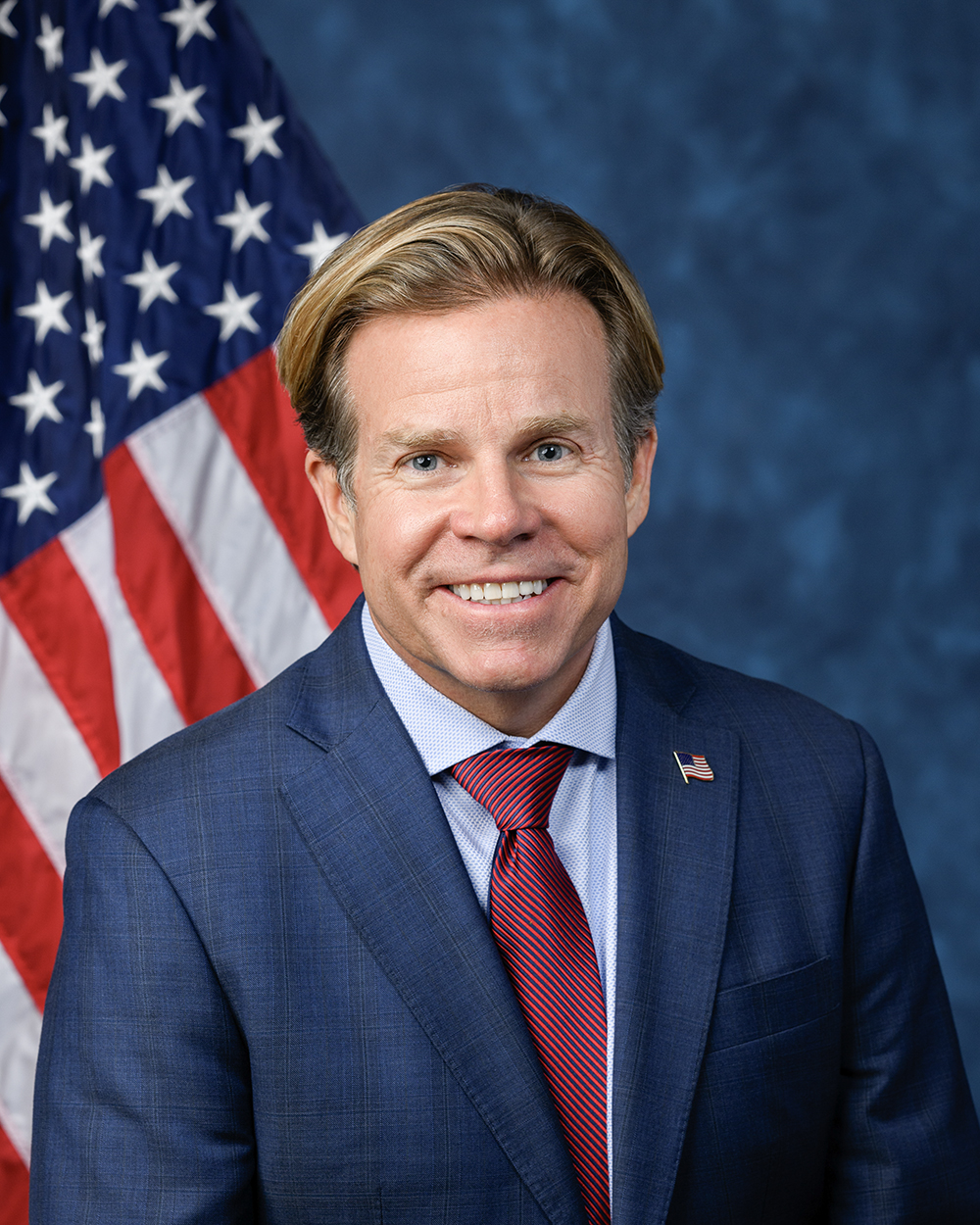
- Official portrait, 2024

Member of the U.S. House of Representatives from Florida's 8th district
- Incumbent
- Assumed office January 3, 2025
- Preceded by: Bill Posey

President of the Florida Senate
- In office November 16, 2010 – November 6, 2012
- Preceded by: Jeff Atwater
- Succeeded by: Don Gaetz

Member of the Florida Senate from the 26th district
- In office March 25, 2003 – November 6, 2012
- Preceded by: Howard Futch
- Succeeded by: Bill Galvano

Member of the Florida House of Representatives from the 30th district
- In office November 7, 2000 – March 25, 2003
- Preceded by: Howard Futch
- Succeeded by: Thad Altman

Personal details
- Born: Michael John Haridopolos; March 15, 1970 (age 56) Huntington, New York, U.S.
- Party: Republican
- Spouse: Stephanie Bressan
- Children: 3
- Education: Stetson University (BA); University of Arkansas (MA)
- Website: House website Campaign website

Michael John Haridopolos (born March 15, 1970) is an American politician, lobbyist, and former educator serving as the U.S. representative from Florida's 8th congressional district since 2025. He is a member of the Republican Party.

In 2024, Haridopolos was elected to the U.S. House of Representatives from Florida's 8th congressional district, an open seat following incumbent Bill Posey's decision not to seek reelection. He previously served in the Florida House of Representatives from 2000 to 2003, and the Florida Senate from 2003 to 2012 and was Senate president from 2010 to 2012.

== Early life and education ==
Michael John Haridopolos was born on March 15, 1970, in Huntington, New York, to Ernest Haridopolos and Georgia Haridopolos. His father was a Greek immigrant who served as an FBI agent and was a graduate of Adelphi College. He received his Bachelor of Arts degree from Stetson University in history and his Master of Arts degree in history from the University of Arkansas.

Haridopolos taught United States History and Political Science at Brevard Community College—now Eastern Florida State College—starting in 1993. Beginning in 2007, Haridopolos taught classes as an instructor at the Bob Graham Center at the University of Florida. He continued to teach at the University of Florida after he left the Florida Senate.

== Florida legislature ==
In 2000, Haridopolos won an open seat in the Florida House, after winning a six-way Republican primary by over 30 percentage points and later won the November general election 65-35%. He won the 2002 Republican primary following re-apportionment with over 82% of the vote and was re-elected to the Florida House with 79% of the vote in the general election.

In January 2003, State Senator Howard Futch died, and a special election was called in order to elect a new senator. Haridopolos won the Republican Party primary with 84% of the vote, and he won 63% of the vote in the general election to win the remainder of the four-year senate term.

In 2008, Haridopolos passed on an open Congressional race with the retirement of Congressman Dave Weldon. Weldon and others asked Haridopolos to run, including the eventual nominee, Bill Posey. Haridopolos endorsed Posey. Posey went on to win both the Republican primary and general election. Haridopolos said that he wanted to focus on his likely role as Senate President and continue his push to make the Florida Senate more conservative.

In both 2006 and 2010, Haridopolos was re-elected without opposition to the Florida Senate. Haridopolos actively supported conservative candidates throughout the state in the 2006, 2008, and 2010 election cycles. In the Florida Senate, Haridopolos served as Majority Whip from 2006 to 2008 and, in 2009, was elected President of the Senate. He was sworn in as Senate President on November 16, 2010, for a two-year term. He presided over the largest Republican majority (28-12) since Reconstruction.

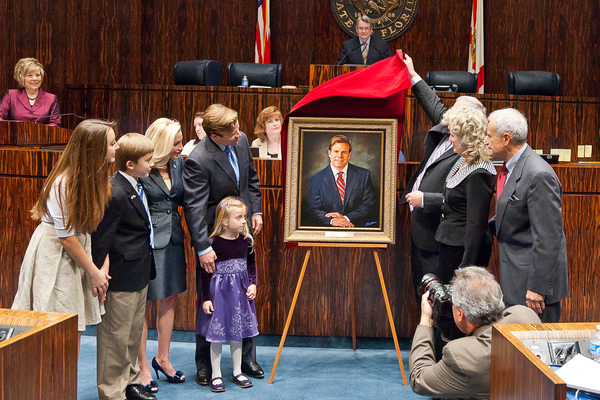
Unveiling of Haridopolos's presidential portrait in 2012

Haridopolos sought the Republican nomination to challenge incumbent U.S. Senator Bill Nelson in 2012. On July 18, 2011, Haridopolos released a campaign video stating that he would no longer seek the nomination, effectively ending his campaign.

His candidacy received a number of endorsements, including former Arkansas Governor Mike Huckabee, U.S. Congressman Connie Mack, CFO Jeff Atwater, and Agriculture Commissioner Adam Putnam. He dropped out of the campaign in July 2011 in order to focus on his position as President of the Florida Senate.

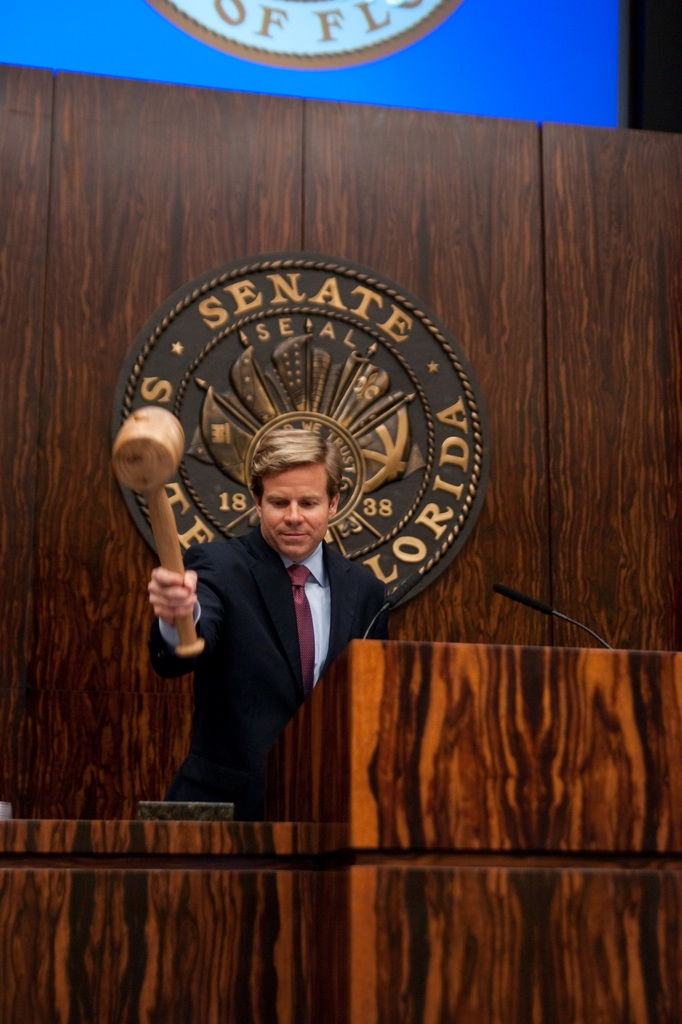
Haridopolos as Senate President

=== Lobbyist ===
He owns and operates MJH Consulting. He has been a lobbyist in Florida.

In 2019, Haridopolos co-authored The Modern Republican Party in Florida with Peter Dunbar, which chronicles the rise of the Republican Party in Florida from the 1950s through the 2018 elections.

== U.S. House of Representatives ==
=== Elections ===
==== 2024 ====
When incumbent Republican Bill Posey announced his retirement in Florida's 8th congressional district in April 2024, Haridopolos quickly announced he was running to succeed him and consolidated Republican support. He was elected with 62% of the vote in November 2024.

=== Tenure ===
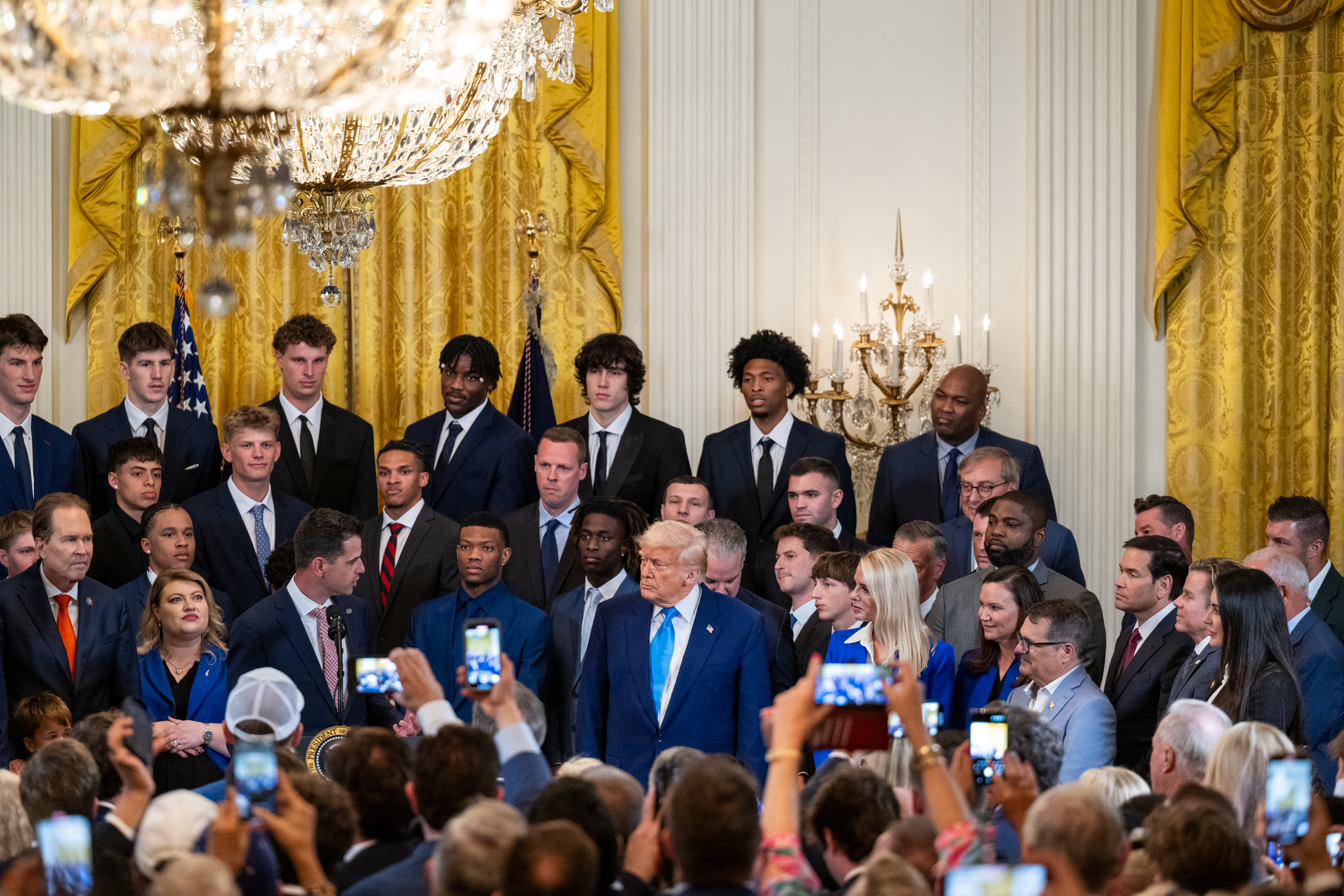
Haridopolos in the East Room of the White House with the Florida Gators men's basketball in 2025.

Rep. Haridopolos was sworn into the 119th United States Congress on January 3, 2025.

In July 2025, he praised the first six months of the second Donald Trump administration.

=== Committee assignments ===
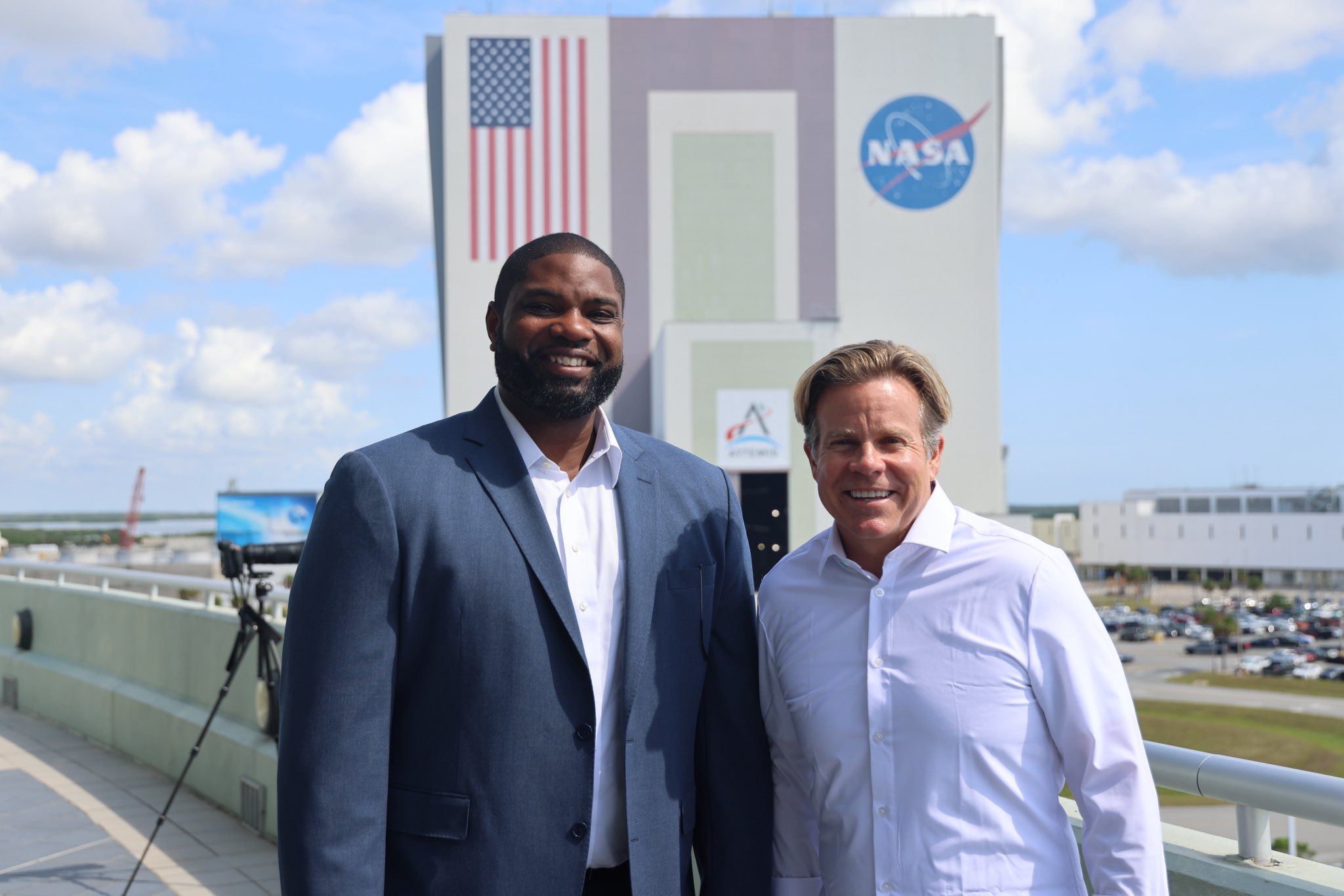
Haridopolos with Congressman Byron Donalds at Kennedy Space Center, 2025

For the 119th Congress:

- Committee on Financial Services
  - Subcommittee on Capital Markets
  - Subcommittee on Digital Assets, Financial Technology, and Artificial Intelligence
  - Subcommittee on Oversight and Investigations
- Committee on Science, Space, and Technology
  - Subcommittee on Space and Aeronautics (Chair)

=== Caucus memberships ===
- Main Street Caucus
- Republican Study Committee

== Personal life ==
Haridopolos is married to Stephanie, who has performed the duties of Surgeon General of the United States since 2026. The couple have three children and reside in Indian Harbour Beach, Florida.

== Electoral history ==
Republican primary results, 2000
| Party | Candidate | Votes | % |
|---|---|---|---|
| Republican | Mike Haridopolos | 6,155 | 47.8% |
| Republican | Peter DiLavore | 2,176 | 16.9% |
| Republican | John Tobia | 1,298 | 10.1% |
| Republican | Christopher Muro | 1,219 | 9.5% |
| Republican | Janet Simpson Bonder | 1,186 | 9.2% |
| Republican | Mary Jane Nail | 833 | 6.5% |
| Total votes | | 12,867 | 100.00% |

Florida House of Representatives District 30 general election, 2000
| Party | Candidate | Votes | % |
|---|---|---|---|
| Republican | Mike Haridopolos | 43,062 | 64.6% |
| Democratic | Rajiv Chandra | 23,595 | 35.4% |
| Total votes | | 66,657 | 100.00% |
| Republican hold | | | |

Republican primary results, 2002
| Party | Candidate | Votes | % |
|---|---|---|---|
| Republican | Mike Haridopolos (incumbent) | 11,251 | 82.4% |
| Republican | Steve Sherbin | 2,398 | 17.6% |
| Total votes | | 13,649 | 100.00% |

Florida House of Representatives District 30 general election, 2002
| Party | Candidate | Votes | % |
|---|---|---|---|
| Republican | Mike Haridopolos (incumbent) | 40,319 | 79.1% |
| Green | Tim Doyle | 10,651 | 20.9% |
| Total votes | | 50,970 | 100.00% |
| Republican hold | | | |

Florida State Senate District 26 special Republican primary, 2003
| Party | Candidate | Votes | % |
|---|---|---|---|
| Republican | Mike Haridopolos | 13,232 | 84.1% |
| Republican | Mary Beth Fitzgibbons | 2,499 | 15.9% |
| Total votes | | 15,731 | 100.00% |

Florida State Senate District 26 special election, 2003
| Party | Candidate | Votes | % |
|---|---|---|---|
| Republican | Mike Haridopolos | 19,643 | 63.1% |
| Democratic | Donna Hart | 11,498 | 36.9% |
| Total votes | | 31,141 | 100.00% |
| Republican hold | | | |

2024 Florida's 8th congressional district Republican primary results
| Party | Candidate | Votes | % |
|---|---|---|---|
| Republican | Mike Haridopolos | 61,710 | 72.1 |
| Republican | John Hearton | 18,604 | 21.7 |
| Republican | Joe Babits (withdrawn) | 5,250 | 6.1 |
| Total votes | | 85,564 | 100.0 |

Florida's 8th congressional district, 2024
| Party | Candidate | Votes | % |
|---|---|---|---|
| Republican | Mike Haridopolos | 280,352 | 62.24 |
| Democratic | Sandy Kennedy | 170,096 | 37.76 |
| Total votes | | 450,448 | 100.00 |
| Republican hold | | | |

== See also ==
- List of new members of the 119th United States Congress

Political offices
| Preceded by Jeff Atwater | President of the Florida Senate; 2010–2012 | Succeeded by Don Gaetz |
U.S. House of Representatives
| Preceded by Bill Posey | Member of the U.S. House of Representatives from Florida's 15th congressional district 2025–present | Incumbent |
U.S. order of precedence (ceremonial)
| Preceded by Abraham Hamadeh | United States representatives by seniority 387th | Succeeded by Pat Harrigan |
