= Bob Melby =

American optometrist and politician (1928–2019)

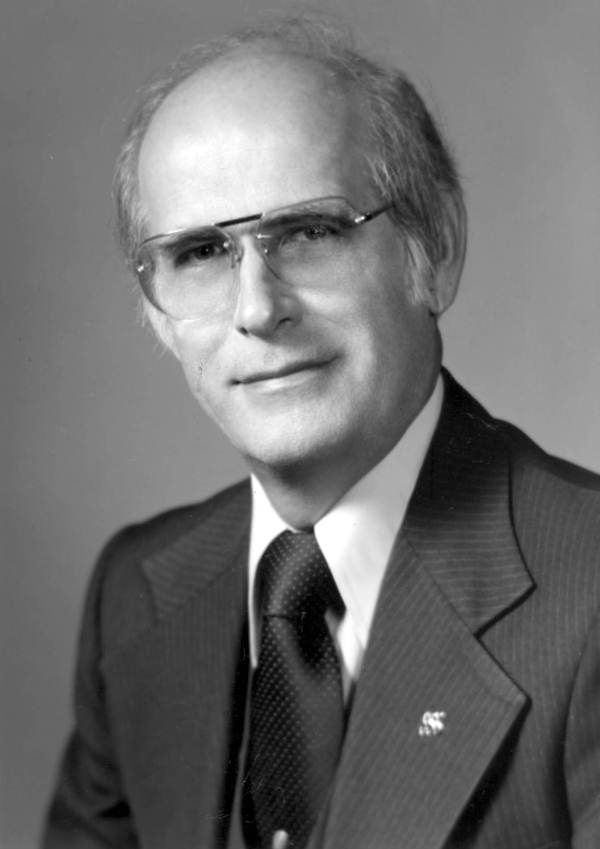

Member of the Florida House of Representatives from the 59th district
- In office November 7, 1978 – November 2, 1982
- Preceded by: Don Poindexter
- Succeeded by: John Grant (redistricting)

Personal details
- Born: August 6, 1928 Thief River Falls, Minnesota
- Died: January 12, 2019 (aged 90) St. Petersburg, Florida
- Party: Republican

Robert E. Melby (August 6, 1928 – January 12, 2019) was an American optometrist and politician in the state of Florida.

Bob was born in Thief River Falls, Minnesota and came to Florida in 1956. He attended St. Olaf College, Moorhead State College, Illinois College of Optometry, and the New England College of Optometry and holds a Doctor of Optometry (O.D.) degree. He served in the Florida House of Representatives from 1978 to 1982 for district 59. He lost reelection in 1982. He was a member of the Republican Party.

Melby ran for the Florida Senate in 1986 for the 18th district. He lost the general election to the incumbent, Jeanne Malchon.
