= Beverly Burnsed Spencer =

American politician

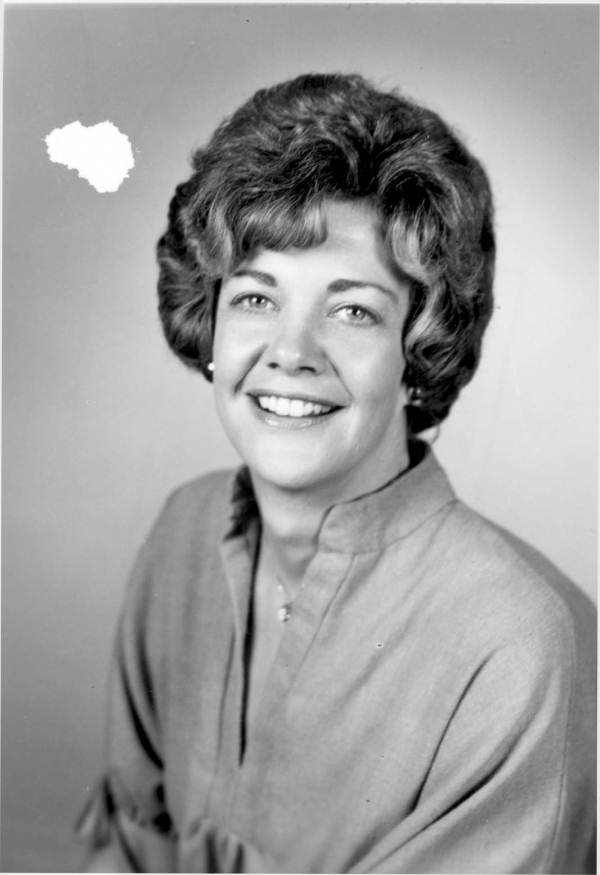
- Burnsed in 1980

Member of the Florida House of Representatives from the 45th district
- In office November 2, 1982 - November 8, 1988
- Preceded by: Winston Gardner Jr.
- Succeeded by: Tom Mims

Member of the Florida House of Representatives from the 50th district
- In office November 2, 1976 - November 2, 1982
- Preceded by: John Clarke
- Succeeded by: Peter Dunbar

Personal details
- Born: October 23, 1941 Tampa, Florida, U.S.
- Died: November 28, 2019 (aged 78)
- Party: Democratic
- Profession: Administrator

Beverly B. Burnsed Spencer (October 23, 1941 – November 28, 2019) was an American politician and university administrator. She was vice president of university relations at Florida State University in Tallahassee, Florida, between 1992 and 2003. Her role in the position involved directing the Florida State University Alumni Association and the Seminole Boosters.

Beverly Spencer, formerly Beverly Burnsed, was also a member of the Florida House of Representatives between 1976 and 1988. She earned a BA in History from Florida State University in 1962.
