= Astronaut Memorial Planetarium and Observatory =

Observatory in Florida, US

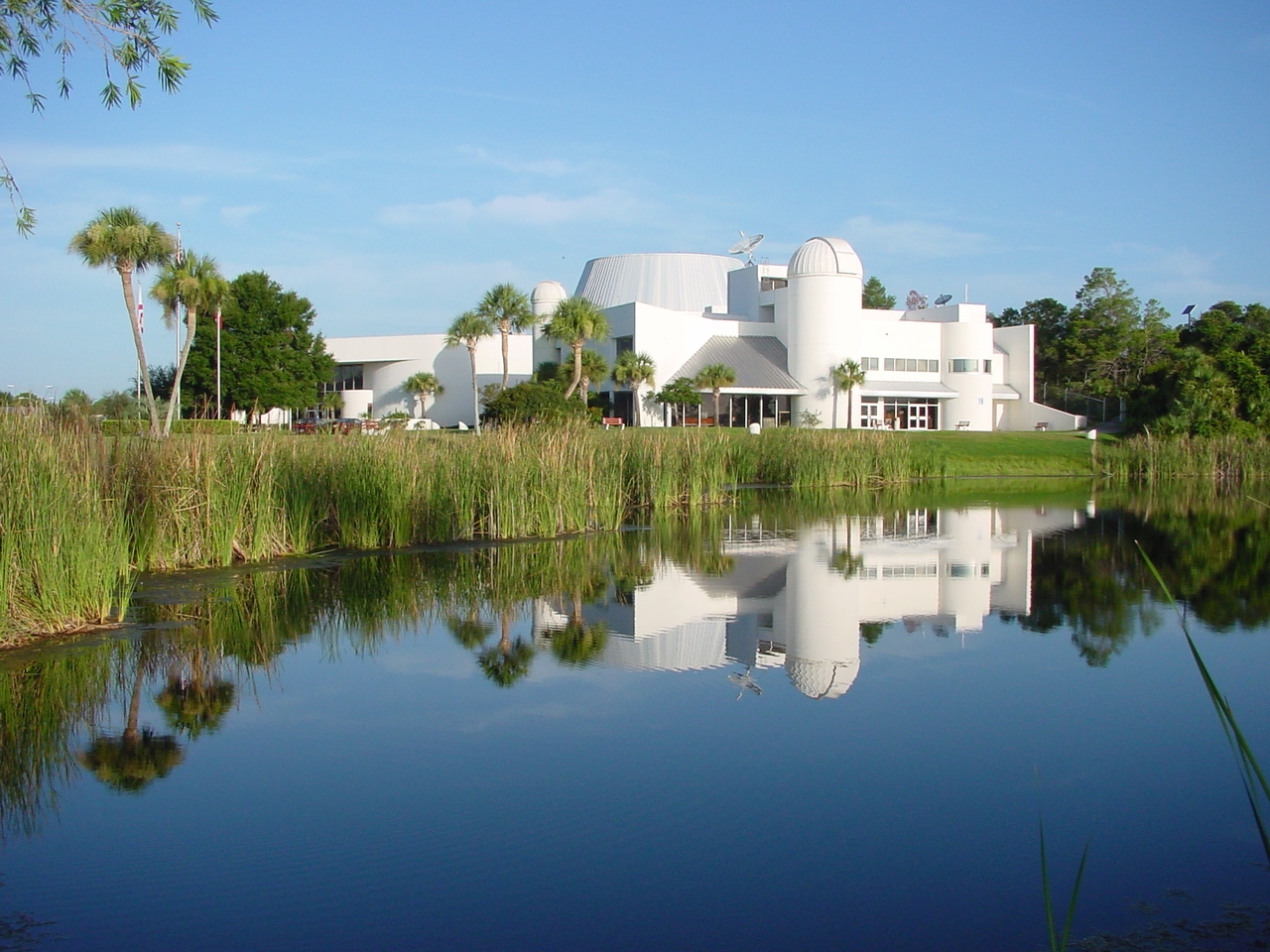
- Organization: Eastern Florida State College
- Observatory code: 758
- Location: Brevard County, Florida, United States
- Coordinates: 28°23′6.5″N 80°45′42.7″W
- Closed: Due to storm damage September 2017, effort to fund reopening started April 2018.
- Website: www.easternflorida.edu/community-resources/planetarium/

Telescopes
- 24 inch reflector
- 12 inch Astromak
- portables

The Astronaut Memorial Planetarium and Observatory, or AMPO, also known as the Eastern Florida State College Planetarium and Observatory, was an astronomical observatory and planetarium at Eastern Florida State College in Cocoa, Florida. The facility consisted of a planetarium, public observatory, large-screen movie theater, exhibit halls, multi-media classroom and an art gallery.

In September 2017 Hurricane Irma caused minor damage to the building. It was shuttered until its eventual demolition in 2022. "The EFSC Planetarium and Observatory on the Cocoa Campus is closed indefinitely because of damage caused by Hurricane Irma." As noted on its homepage retrieved 2020-07-05. In April 2018 the college announced an effort to raise $9M to repair and refurbish the planetarium and observatory.

The fundraising push failed, and the Planetarium was demolished in 2022 due to the severe hurricane damage and the aging, deteriorating infrastructure. It is announced that a new planetarium will likely be built to replace the original planetarium destroyed by Hurricane Irma.

== Planetarium and observatory ==
The 210-seat planetarium theater was a 70-foot overhead hemisphere onto which images from a variety of projectors were shone, to simulate the night sky and to provide multimedia educational and entertainment programs to area schools and to the public. On the rooftop public observatory, visitors could view planets, stars, galaxies and other objects directly through a 24-inch-diameter (610 mm) Ritchey–Chrétien telescope operated by observatory staff and members of the Brevard Astronomical Society.

== Other facilities ==
The observatory was also home to The Discovery Theater, Science Quest Exhibit Hall, and the International Hall of Space Explorers. The Discovery Theater used a 70 mm Iwerks movie projector to show science and nature films. It also had an art gallery wherein which images of space were shown, such as Messier 101.

== See also ==
- List of astronomical observatories
- List of planetariums
