= Daniel A. Vogt =

American politician

Member of the Florida House of Representatives
- In office 1856–1861

Personal details
- Relatives: John Vogt (great-great nephew)

Daniel A. Vogt was an American politician who was a member of the Florida House of Representatives from 1856 until 1861. He was an outspoken advocate for secession before the American Civil War. He took in his nephews after the American Civil War.

One of the nephews he took in, Albertus Vogt, helped establish the phosphate driven land boom in Ocala.

Daniel Vogt's great, great nephew John Vogt served as the President of the Florida Senate.
