= Lori Wilson =

Lori Wilson may refer to:

- Lori Wilson (Florida politician)
- Lori Wilson (California politician)
