= 2006 Florida Commissioner of Agriculture election =

- November 7, 2006
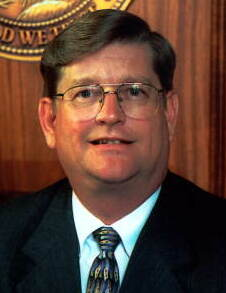

Nominee	Charles Bronson	Eric Copeland
Party	Republican	Democratic
Popular vote	2,651,833	2,002,464
Percentage	57.0%	43.0%
- County results Bronson: 50-60% 60-70% 70-80% Copeland: 50-60% 60-70%
Agriculture
Commissioner before election
Charles Bronson
Republican
Elected Agriculture
Commissioner
Charles Bronson
Republican

The 2006 Florida Commissioner of Agriculture election took place on November 7, 2006, to elect the Florida Commissioner of Agriculture. Charles Bronson won a second term.

== Republican ==
Republican primary results
Party	Candidate	Votes	%
Republican	Charles Bronson	Unopposed	100.0

== Democratic ==
Democratic primary results
Party	Candidate	Votes	%
Democratic	Eric Copeland	Unopposed	100.0

== General Election ==
Agriculture Commissioner of Florida General election, 2006
Party	Candidate	Votes	%
Republican	Charles Bronson (incumbent)	2,651,833	57.0
Democratic	Eric Copeland	2,002,464	43.0
Total votes		4,654,297	100.0
Republican hold			
