= Jeanne Malchon =

American politician (1923–2009)

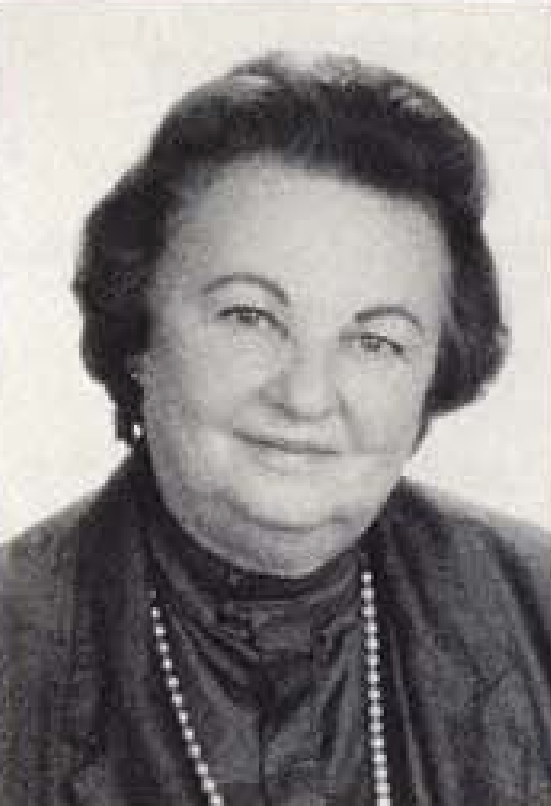

Member of the Florida Senate from the 18th district
- In office November 2, 1982 – November 3, 1992
- Preceded by: John Ware
- Succeeded by: Patricia Grogan (redistricting)

Personal details
- Born: June 17, 1923 Newark, New Jersey
- Died: August 23, 2009 (aged 86) St. Petersburg, Florida
- Party: Democratic
- Spouse: Richard Malchon
- Children: 1
- Education: Virginia Intermont College (A.A.)
- Occupation: Communications consultant, businesswoman

Jeanne Malchon (June 17, 1923 – August 23, 2009) was a Democratic politician from Florida who served as a member of the Florida Senate from the 18th district from 1982 to 1992 and on the Pinellas County Commission from 1975 to 1982.

== Early life and career ==
Malchon was born in Newark, New Jersey, in 1923, and attended Virginia Intermont College, receiving her associate's degree in 1943. She worked as a civilian employee for the U.S. Army in Hawaii during World War II. Malchon and her husband moved to St. Petersburg, Florida, in 1952, where she was active in the League of Women Voters.

In 1974, Malchon challenged Republican State Representative Dennis McDonald for re-election in the 57th district. She narrowly lost to him, winning 48 percent of the vote to McDonald's 52 percent.

Malchon planned on challenging McDonald in 1976. However, in 1975, Governor Reubin Askew suspended Pinellas County Commissioner William Dockerty from office after facing corruption charges, and appointed Malchon as his replacement. She became the first woman to serve on the county commission. She was re-elected in 1976, but was defeated in 1980 by Republican Barbara Sheen Todd.

== Florida Senate ==
In 1982, Malchon ran for the Florida Senate from the 18th district, challenging Republican State Senator John Ware for re-election. Malchon campaigned on her support for abortion rights, gun control, and the Equal Rights Amendment, which Ware opposed, and narrowly defeated him, winning 52 percent of the vote to his 48 percent.

Malchon ran for re-election in 1986. A crowded field of Republicans filed to challenge her: former State Senator Richard Deeb, former State Representative Bob Melby, homebuilder Paul Haggar, and attorney Charlie Crist. Melby won the primary runoff against Crist, and Malchon narrowly defeated him in the general election, winning her second term, 51-49 percent.

In 1990, Malchon ran for a third term. Melby ran against her again, but was defeated in the Republican primary by orthopedic surgeon Don Sullivan and businesswoman Pat Baker, who advanced to a runoff election that Sullivan ultimately won. Malchon defeated Sullivan in the general election, winning 54 percent of the vote to his 46 percent.

Following a contentious redistricting process in 1992, Malchon was drawn into a minority-majority district. She announced that she would not run against fellow Democratic State Senator Helen Gordon Davis in a neighboring district or seek re-election in her redrawn district, and declined to seek another term.

== Death ==
Malchon died on August 23, 2009.

She is portrayed by Mary Catherine Garrison in the 2026 Tom McCarthy film A Statement.
