= Howard Futch =

American politician (1928–2003)

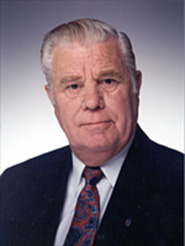

Member of the Florida Senate
- In office August 21, 2001 – January 23, 2003
- Preceded by: Charles Bronson
- Succeeded by: Mike Haridopolos
- Constituency: 18th district (2001–2002); 26th district (2002–2003)

Member of the Florida House of Representatives from the 30th district
- In office November 3, 1992 – November 7, 2000
- Preceded by: Dixie Sansom (redistricting)
- Succeeded by: Mike Haridopolos

Personal details
- Born: February 8, 1928 Washington, D.C.
- Died: January 23, 2003 (aged 74) Tallahassee, Florida
- Party: Republican
- Spouse: Joyce
- Children: 4
- Education: Strayer College
- Occupation: Real estate broker, government manager

Military service
- Allegiance: United States
- Branch/service: United States Army

Howard E. Futch (February 8, 1928 – January 23, 2003) was a Republican politician from Florida who served as a member of the Florida House of Representatives from 1992 to 2000 and as a member of the Florida Senate from 2001 until his death in 2003.

Futch was elected the Florida House of Representatives from the 30th district in 1992, succeeding Republican State Representative Dixie Sansom. He served until 2000, when he was term-limited.

In 2001, when State Senator Charles Bronson was appointed Commissioner of Agriculture, Futch was elected in a special election to succeed him in the 18th district. After redistricting, he was elected to a full term in the 26th district.

Futch died on January 23, 2003, in Tallahassee, Florida, during the legislative session.
