= Leonard Spencer =

American politician from Florida

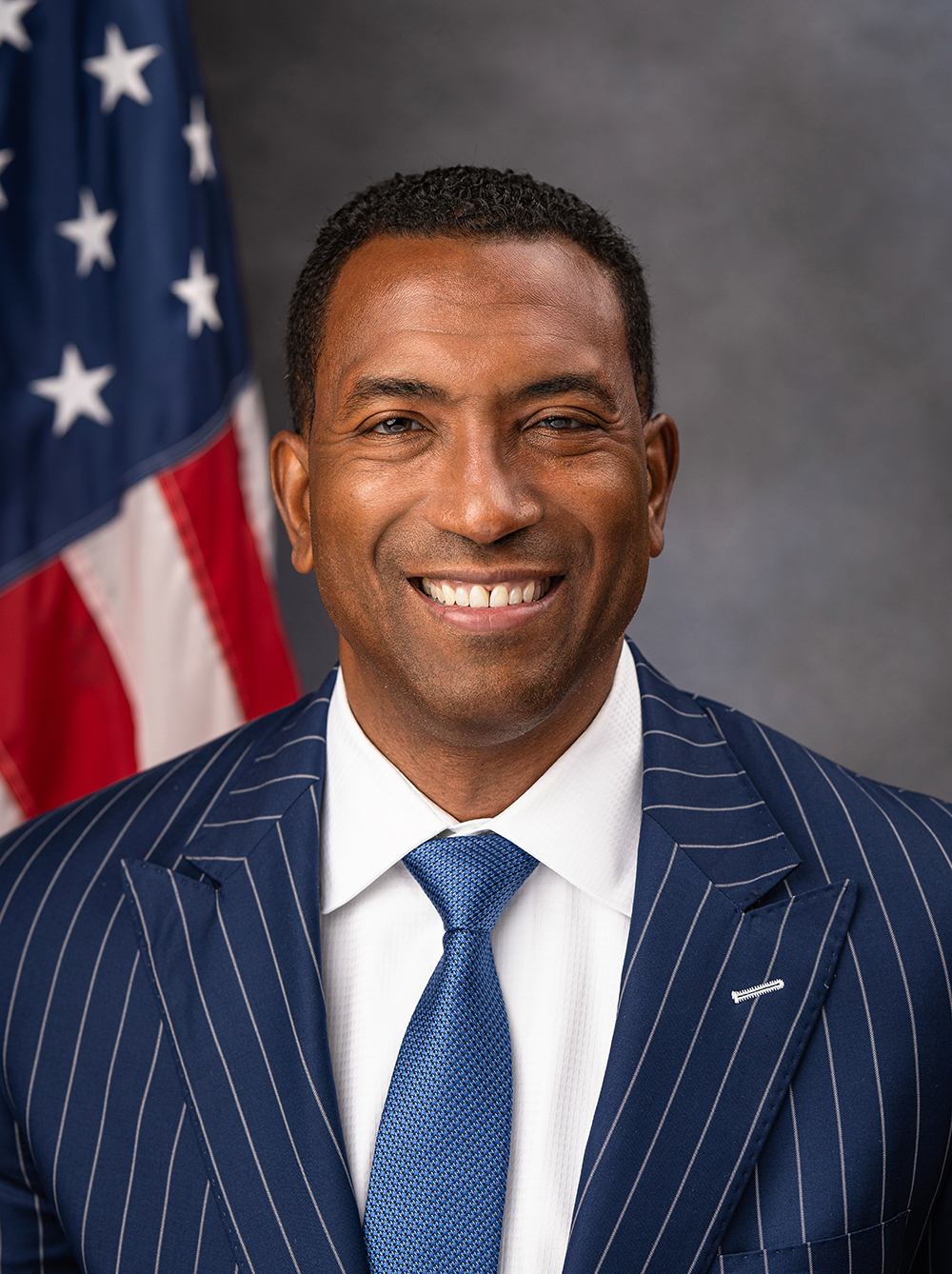
- Official portrait, c. 2024

Member of the Florida House of Representatives from the 45th district
- Incumbent
- Assumed office November 5, 2024
- Preceded by: Carolina Amesty

Personal details
- Born: Leonard Karl Spencer; July 11, 1971 (age 55) Jacksonville, Florida, U.S.
- Party: Democratic
- Spouse: Tanya E. Spencer
- Children: 2
- Education: Tuskegee University (BS); University of Alabama (MBA)
- Occupation: Politician; businessman
- Website: Campaign website

Leonard Karl Spencer (born July 11, 1971) is an American politician and corporate executive who currently serves as a Democratic member of the Florida House of Representatives representing the 45th district, which comprises southwestern portions of Orange County and northwestern parts of Osceola County, including Windermere and Oakland.

== Professional career ==
Spencer worked for GE from 2002 to 2005 and then worked for The Walt Disney Company from 2005 to 2021. Spencer has worked for Amazon since 2021.

== Political career ==
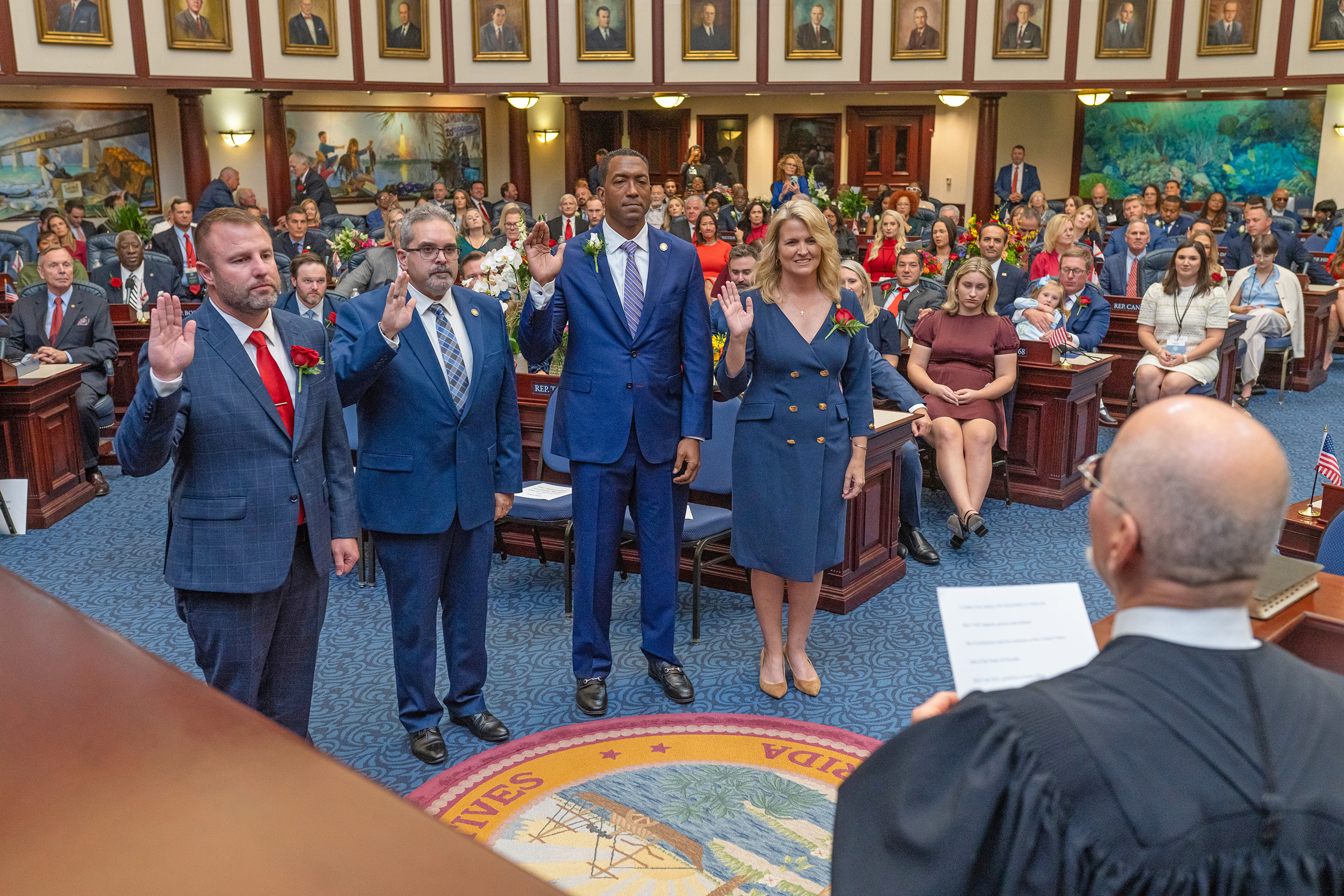
Spencer sworn into office

In May 2024, Spencer announced his candidacy for the Florida House of Representatives to unseat Carolina Amesty. Spencer was elected with 50.8% of the votes cast for a 1,600-vote margin; the only Democrat to flip a seat in the state House in the 2024 Florida House of Representatives election. He was officially sworn into office on November 19, 2024.

== Personal life ==
Spencer is married to his wife Tanya. They live in Gotha, Florida and have two grown children. He was raised in Mobile, AL, and is a native of Jacksonville, FL.

Florida House of Representatives
Preceded by Carolina Amesty	Member of the Florida House of Representatives from the 45th district 2024–present	Incumbent
