= 2002 Florida Commissioner of Agriculture election =

- November 5, 2002
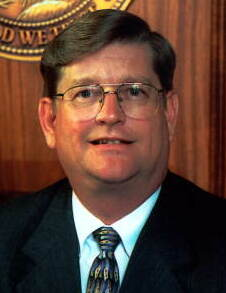

Nominee	Charles Bronson	David Nelson
Party	Republican	Democratic
Popular vote	2,803,890	2,084,487
Percentage	57.36%	42.64%
- Bronson: 50-60% 60-70% 70-80% Nelson: 50-60% 60-70%
Agriculture
Commissioner before election
Charles Bronson
Republican
Elected Agriculture
Commissioner
Charles Bronson
Republican

The 2002 Florida Commissioner of Agriculture election took place on November 5, 2002, to elect the Florida Commissioner of Agriculture. Charles Bronson won and was in office from May 14, 2001 to January 4, 2011.

Charles Bronson served under two governors, Jeb Bush And Charlie Crist.

== Candidates ==
=== Republican ===
- Charles H. Bronson

=== Democratic ===
- David Nelson

== General Election ==
Agriculture Commissioner of Florida General election, 2002
Party	Candidate	Votes	%
Republican	Charles H. Bronson	2,803,890	57.36
Democratic	David Nelson	2,084,487	42.64
Total votes		4,888,377	100.0
Republican hold			
