= Joe Tedder =

American politician (born 1962)

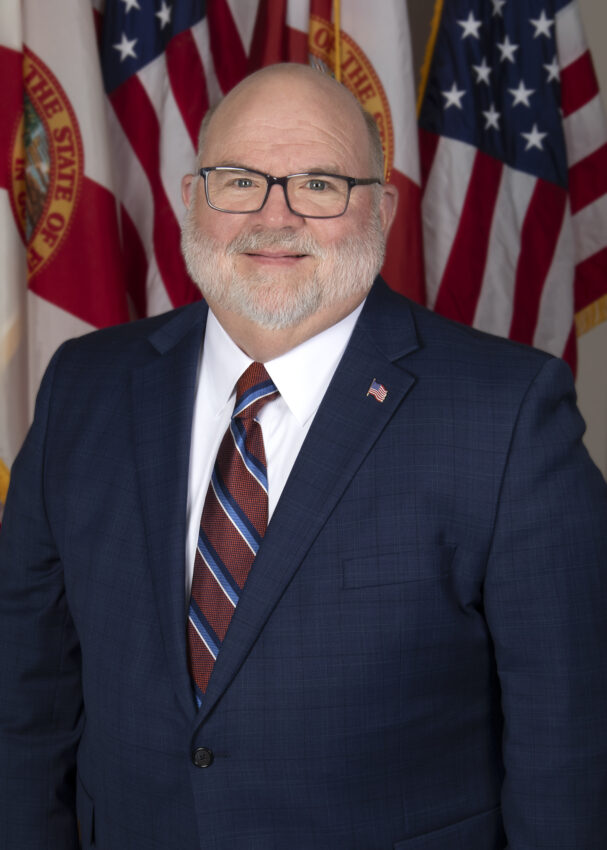

Polk County Tax Collector
- Incumbent
- Assumed office January 7, 1997
- Preceded by: Jack Fouts

Member of the Florida House of Representatives from the 64th district
- In office November 3, 1992 – November 5, 1996
- Preceded by: Tom Mims (redistricting)
- Succeeded by: Paula Dockery

Personal details
- Born: February 28, 1962 (age 64) Tampa, Florida
- Party: Democratic (until 2022); Republican (2022–present)
- Education: Florida State University; Florida Southern College (B.S.)
- Occupation: Accountant

Joseph G. Tedder (born February 28, 1962) is a Republican politician from Florida who has served as the Tax Collector of Polk County since 1997. He was previously elected to the Florida House of Representatives from the 64th district as a Democrat, and served from 1992 to 1996.

== Early life ==
Tedder was born in Tampa, Florida, in 1962, and grew up in Lakeland, graduating from Lakeland Senior High School. He attended Florida State University, and graduated from Florida Southern College in 1987 with his bachelor's degree in accounting. After graduation, Tedder returned to Lakeland, where he worked for Tedder, Grimsley and Company, an accounting firm started by his father.

== Florida House of Representatives ==
In 1992, when State Representative Tom Mims opted to run for Congress, Tedder ran to succeed him in the renumbered 64th district. In the Democratic primary, he faced farmer Lem Bath, former Polk County Commissioner Royce Ready, and attorney Jim Tanner.

Tedder placed first in the primary, winning 34 percent of the vote, and advanced to a runoff election with Tanner, who narrowly placed second with 24 percent of the vote. Tedder defeated Tanner in the runoff by a wide margin, receiving 67 percent of the vote to Tanner's 33 percent. In the general election, Tedder ran against Republican nominee Jean Burt, a real estate broker. He defeated her with 56 percent of the vote.

In 1994, Tedder ran for re-election. He was challenged by Wayne Brown, a computer programmer and Christian activist. Tedder defeated Brown with 57 percent of the vote.

== Polk County Tax Collector ==
In 1996, Tedder ran for Polk County Tax Collector rather than seek re-election to a third term. Long-time Tax Collector Hobson Strain retired in 1994, and Governor Lawton Chiles appointed assistant tax collector Jack Fouts to succeed him, but Fouts declined to run for a full term. He won the Democratic primary with 71 percent of the vote over Terry Collins, and faced Republican Randy Kincaid, an auctioneer, in the general election. Tedder defeated Kincaid with 60 percent of the vote.

Tedder was re-elected without opposition in 2000, 2004, 2008, 2012, 2016, and 2020. 2016. In 2022, Tedder registered as a Republican. He was re-elected unopposed in 2024.
