= John Laurent =

American politician and judge (born 1946)

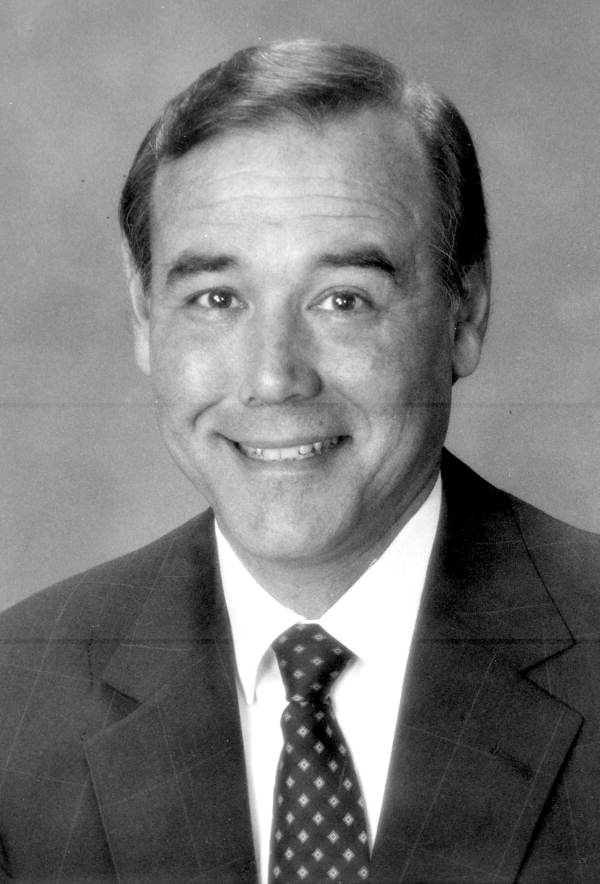

Judge of the 10th Judicial Circuit Court of Florida, Group 21
- In office January 7, 2003 – January 31, 2013
- Preceded by: Position created
- Succeeded by: Glenn Terry Shelby

Member of the Florida Senate from the 17th district
- In office March 10, 1998 – November 5, 2002
- Preceded by: Rick Dantzler
- Succeeded by: J. D. Alexander

Member of the Florida House of Representatives
- In office November 6, 1990 – March 10, 1998
- Preceded by: Rick Dantzler
- Succeeded by: J. D. Alexander
- Constituency: 43rd district (1990–1992); 66th district (1992–1998)

Personal details
- Born: October 4, 1946 (age 79) Bartow, Florida
- Party: Republican
- Spouse: Martha Espinosa
- Children: 2
- Education: University of Florida (B.S., J.D.)
- Occupation: Attorney

John F. Laurent (born October 4, 1946) is a Republican politician and judge from Florida who served as a member of the Florida House of Representatives from 1990 to 1998 and as a member of the Florida Senate from the 17th district from 1998 to 2002. In 2002, he was elected unopposed to a newly created seat on the 10th Judicial Circuit Court of Florida, and he retired in 2013.
