= J. D. Alexander =

American politician

JD Alexander
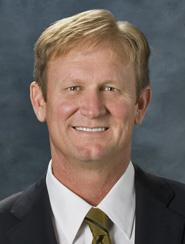

Member of the Florida Senate from the 17th district
- In office 2002–2012
- Preceded by: John Laurent
- Succeeded by: John Legg (redistricting)

Member of the Florida House of Representatives from the 66th district
- In office 1998–2002
- Preceded by: John Laurent
- Succeeded by: Baxter Troutman

Personal details
- Born: July 16, 1959 (age 67) Camp Lejeune, North Carolina, U.S.
- Party: Republican
- Spouse: Cindy Monroe
- Education: University of Florida (B.S., Agricultural Economics)
- Profession: Citrus farmer

John David Alexander, known as J. D. Alexander or JD Alexander (born July 16, 1959) is a businessman and former Florida Republican politician from Lake Wales. From 2002–2012, he served in the Florida Senate, representing almost 500,000 residents of the 17th district, which included all of Hardee and Highlands and parts of DeSoto, Glades, Okeechobee, Polk, and St. Lucie counties. Previously, he was a member of the Florida House of Representatives from 1998 to 2002. Alexander has also been the CEO of Atlantic Blue Group and Alico.

== Personal life ==
J.D. Alexander moved with his parents and the rest of his family to Florida in 1961 from Camp Lejeune, North Carolina. He is the grandson of Ben Hill Griffin Jr., a Florida cracker, former Florida state representative, former Florida state senator, former gubernatorial candidate, and a wealthy and politically powerful citrus and real estate magnate in Florida in the 1960s and 1970s. Alexander went to work upon graduation from college and rose quickly within corporate leadership

== Political career ==
=== Florida House of Representatives ===
JD Alexander served in the Florida House of Representatives from 1998 to 2002.

=== Florida Senate ===
Alexander was elected to the Florida Senate in November 2002 and was subsequently reelected in 2004 and 2008. Senator Alexander served as Majority Whip for the 2004-2006 term.

Senator Alexander served as the Chair of the Budget Committee and the Joint Legislative Budget Commission. In addition, he served as the Vice-Chair of the Rules Committee and a member on the Agriculture, Banking and Insurance, Budget Subcommittee on Finance and Tax, Budget Subcommittee on Transportation, Tourism, and Economic Development Appropriations, Education Pre-K – 12, and Rules Subcommittee on Ethics and Elections. Due to term limits, he will leave the senate at the end of the 2012 session, but he is intent on funding two projects in his district. The first is the $34.5 million Heartland Parkway, a proposed toll road that has been delayed for years because there is not enough existing traffic to justify it, and it will cross sensitive environmental land. Alexander's company owns a ranch along the path of the proposed roadway which could benefit from its construction. Other development near the highway would support building the expressway, and Alexander is promoting one such project.

One of Alexander's major initiatives was the establishment of Florida Polytechnic University in Lakeland. Alexander promoted splitting the institution, originally a branch campus of the University of South Florida known as USF Polytechnic, into a separate school in the State University System of Florida. This was controversial in some quarters, as it came during a very tight budget year, and thus the Florida Board of Governors favored a more measured approach. Alexander advanced a state budget for 2012-2013 that provided $33 million for USF Polytechnic to become an independent institution. The budget included a large cut for the State University System, almost 25% of which came from USF, comprising 58% of its budget. For his part, Alexander sees the establishment of the university as his legacy.

== Business ==
Alexander was the CEO of Atlantic Blue Group, Inc.—which owns a large amount of rural property in Central Florida—and Alico, Inc.

== Affiliations ==
- Polk Farm Bureau Board of Director, President
- Polk Business for World Class Schools, Board of Directors, past Vice Chair
- Vanguard School Board of Trustees
- Florida Citrus Research Advisory Council, past Member & past Chair
- Florida Citrus Production Managers Association, past Board of Directors & past President
- Florida Citrus Research and Education Foundation, Past Board of Directors

== Education ==
Alexander graduated from the University of Florida in 1981 with a B.S. in Agriculture.

== Family ==
Alexander is married to the former Cindy Monroe, and they are the parents of two daughters, Keaton and Britton
