= Winston Gardner Jr. =

American politician (born 1938)

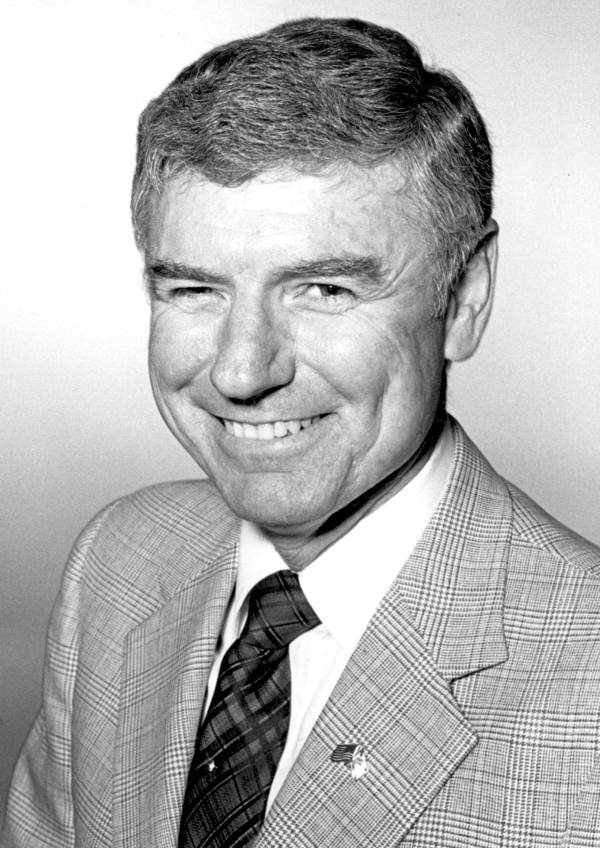

Member of the Florida Senate from the 17th district
- In office November 8, 1988 – November 3, 1992
- Preceded by: John Vogt
- Succeeded by: Rick Dantzler

Member of the Florida House of Representatives
- In office November 7, 1978 – November 8, 1988
- Preceded by: Clark Maxwell Jr.
- Succeeded by: Beverly Burnsed Spencer
- Constituency: 45th district (1978–1982); 31st district (1982–1988)

Personal details
- Born: October 27, 1938 (age 87) Montgomery, Alabama
- Party: Democratic
- Spouse: Jerol McLean
- Children: 2
- Education: Auburn University (B.S.C.E.)
- Occupation: Engineer

Winston W. "Bud" Gardner Jr. (born October 27, 1938) is a Democratic politician from Florida who served as a member of the Florida House of Representatives from 1978 to 1988 and as a member of the Florida Senate from the 17th district from 1988 to 1992.

Gardner was born in Montgomery, Alabama. He moved to Florida in 1965. He served as a member of the Brevard County, Florida School Board from 1973 to 1978. He served in the Florida House of Representatives from 1978 to 1988, representing district 31 and district 45. He served as a member of the Florida Senate from 1988 to 1992 representing District 17. He is a member of the Democratic Party.
