= John Vogt (politician) =

American politician (1936–2018)

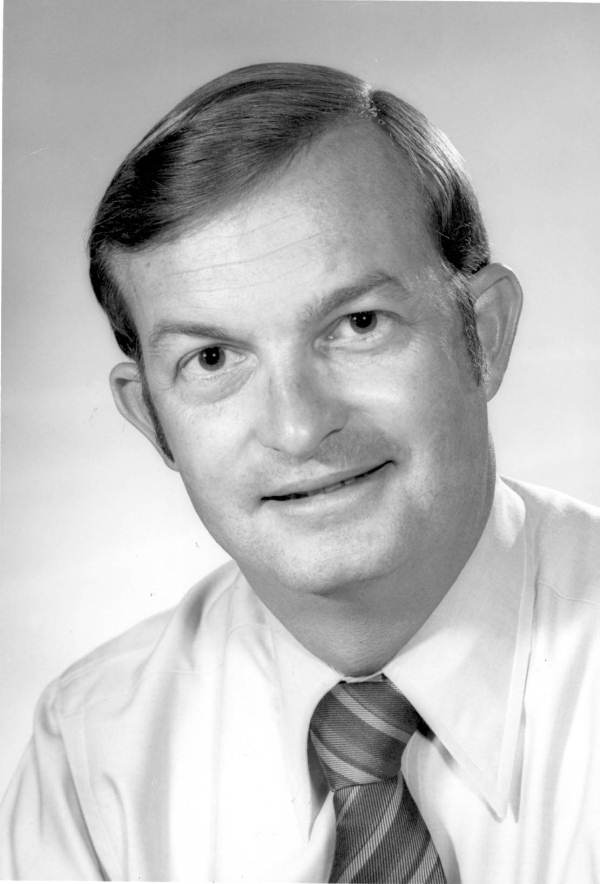

President of the Florida Senate
- In office November 18, 1986 – November 22, 1988
- Preceded by: Harry Johnston
- Succeeded by: Bob Crawford

Member of the Florida Senate from the 17th district
- In office November 21, 1972 – November 22, 1988
- Preceded by: John L. Ducker
- Succeeded by: Winston Gardner Jr.

Personal details
- Born: December 28, 1936 Lake Wales, Florida
- Died: March 21, 2018 (aged 81)
- Party: Democratic
- Education: University of Florida
- Occupation: engineer

John W. Vogt (December 28, 1936 – March 21, 2018) was an American engineer and politician in the state of Florida.

Vogt was born in Lake Wales, Florida in 1936. He attended the University of Florida, University of South Florida, and Rutgers University and was an engineer. He was elected to the State Senate for the 17th district in 1972 and served until 1988. He was a former president of the Florida Senate. He died on March 21, 2018, at the age of 81 after a struggle with interstitial fibrosis.

His great great uncle Daniel A. Vogt was a member of the Florida House of Representatives during the Civil War.
