= King Center for the Performing Arts =

Performing arts venue in Melbourne, Florida, USA

Coordinates: 28.1703°N 80.6693°W

Maxwell C. King Center for the Performing Arts
- King Center
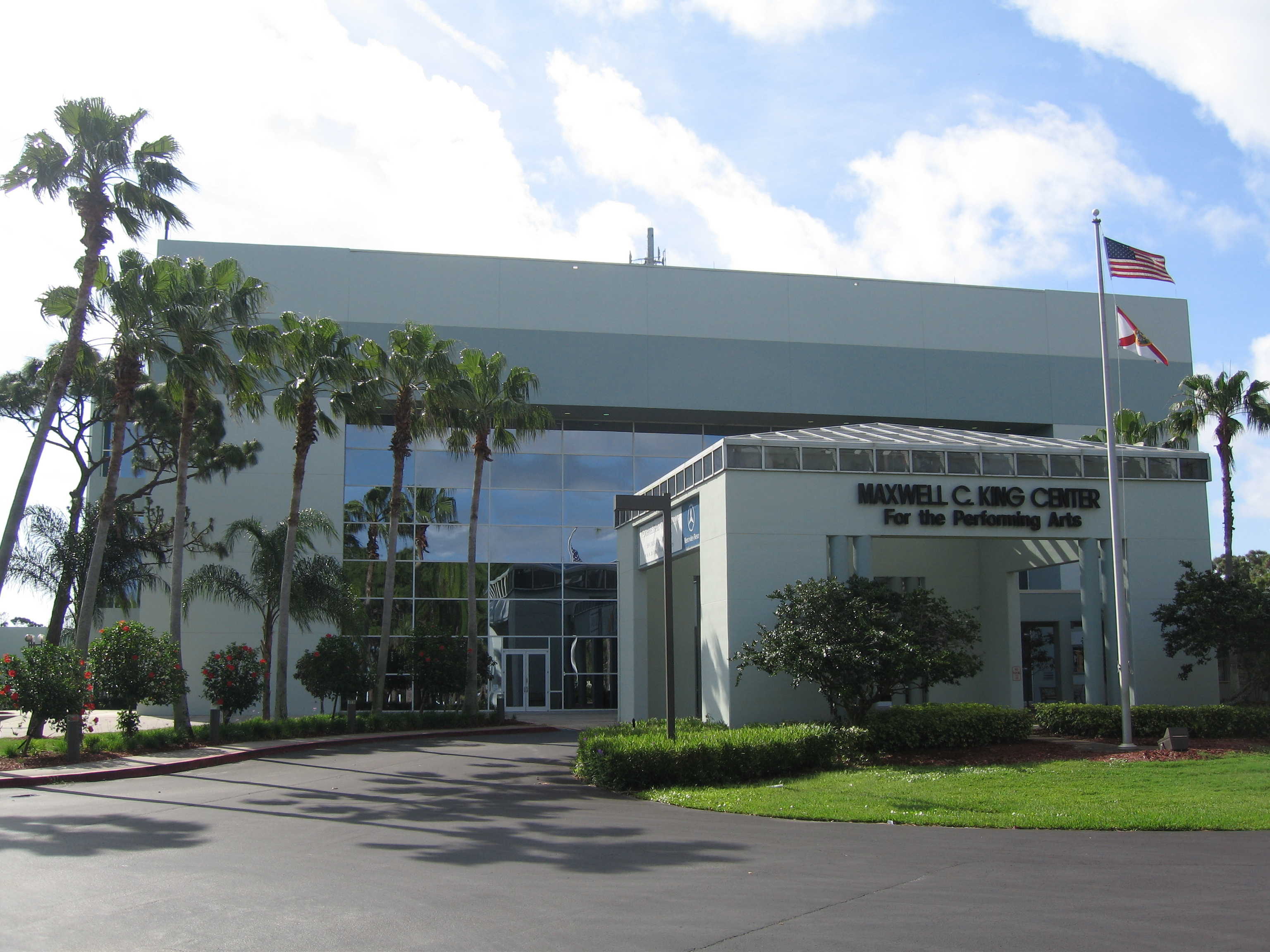
- Front View
- Interactive map of Maxwell C. King Center for the Performing Arts
- Former names: Brevard Performing Arts Center
- Location: 3865 North Wickham Rd; Melbourne, Florida
- Owner: Eastern Florida State College
- Capacity: 2,000 seat main theater
- Type: Performing arts center

Construction
- Opened: April 10, 1988

Website
- www.kingcenter.com

The King Center or the Maxwell C. King Center for the Performing Arts is a performing arts venue located at 3865 North Wickham Road, Melbourne, Florida. The main theatre of the 126,000 square feet (11,700 m^{2}) facility contains 2,016 seats. There is also a 250-seat venue named the Studio Theatre or the Black Box in the facility.

== History ==
The Florida Legislature approved funds for initial design work in 1983 and construction between 1985 and 1986 for the $12.3 million facility. On April 10, 1988, the venue opened under the name Brevard Performing Arts Center with two sold-out performances of Singin' in the Rain. The next year, the named changed to Maxwell C. King Center for the Performing Arts.

== Performances ==
The King Center presents more than 115 shows annually.

== Operations ==
The center employs 10 full-time and 57 part-time employees. There are 200 volunteers.

== Finances ==
Endowment was $3.5 million in 2009.

In 2009, it needed $2 million in repairs. It lost $911,000 in 2008. Management estimated that they would lose $700,000 in 2009.

== Gallery ==
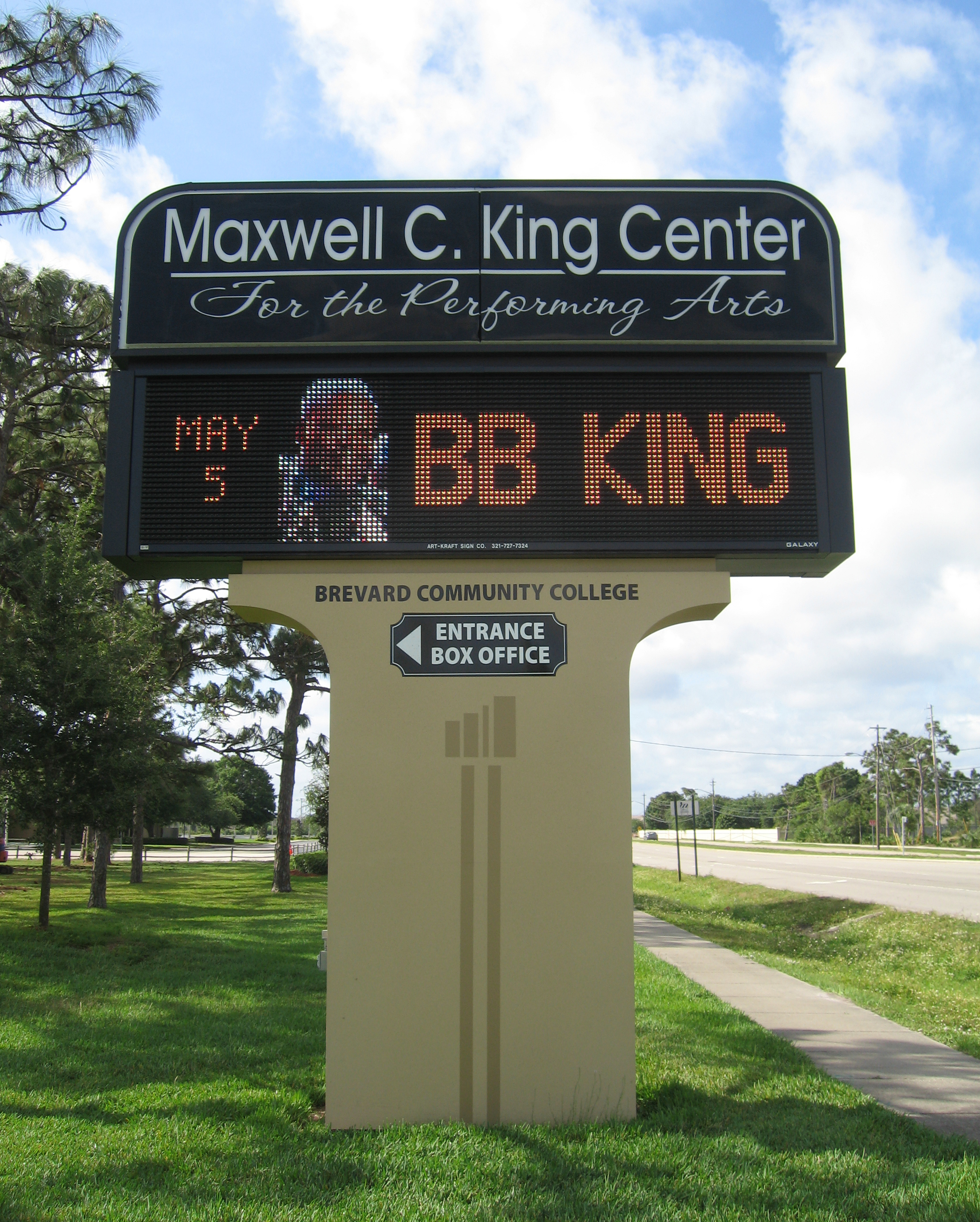
Marquee sign at the King Center

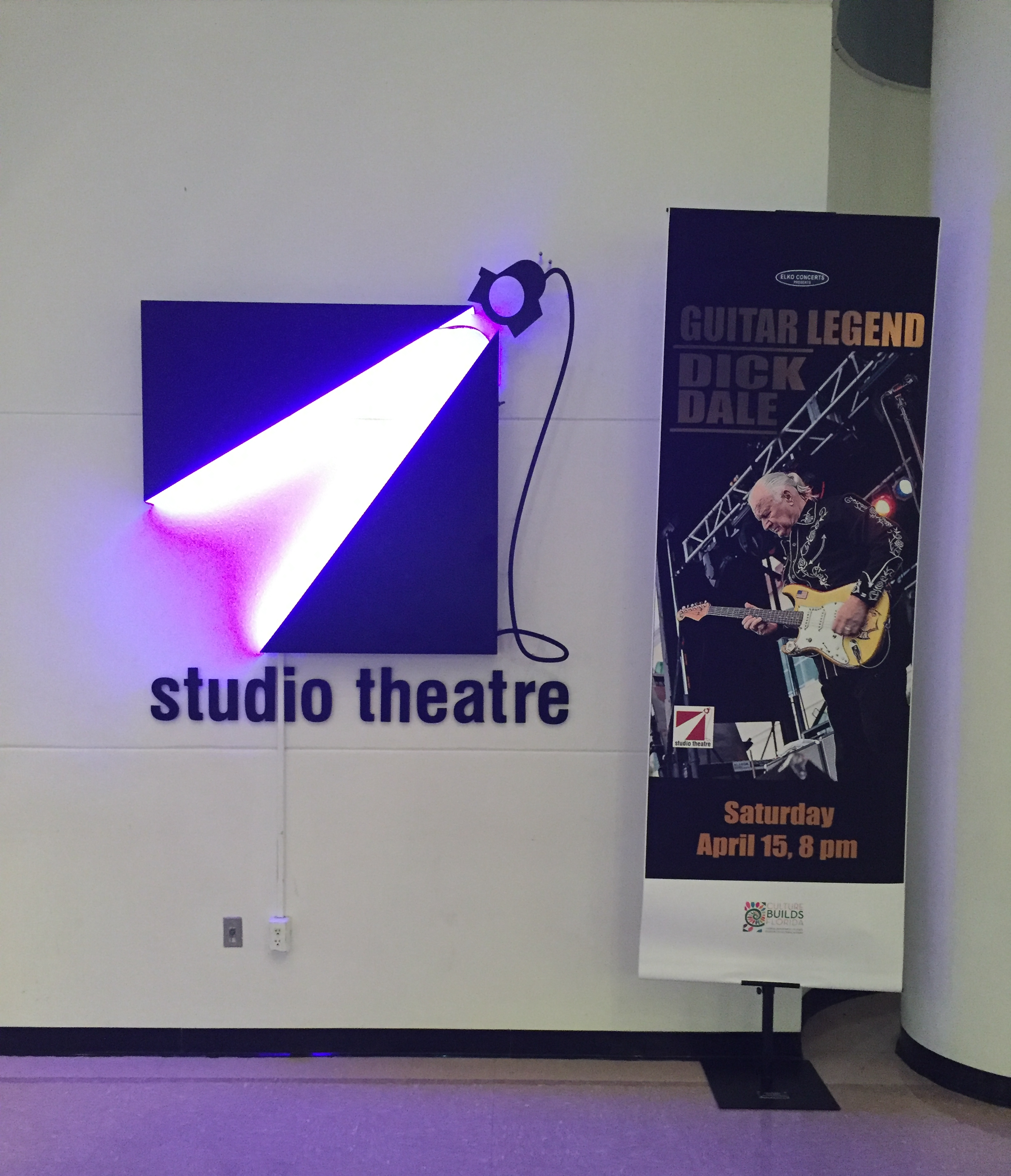
Studio Theatre
