= Stephanie Haridopolos =

American physician and public health official

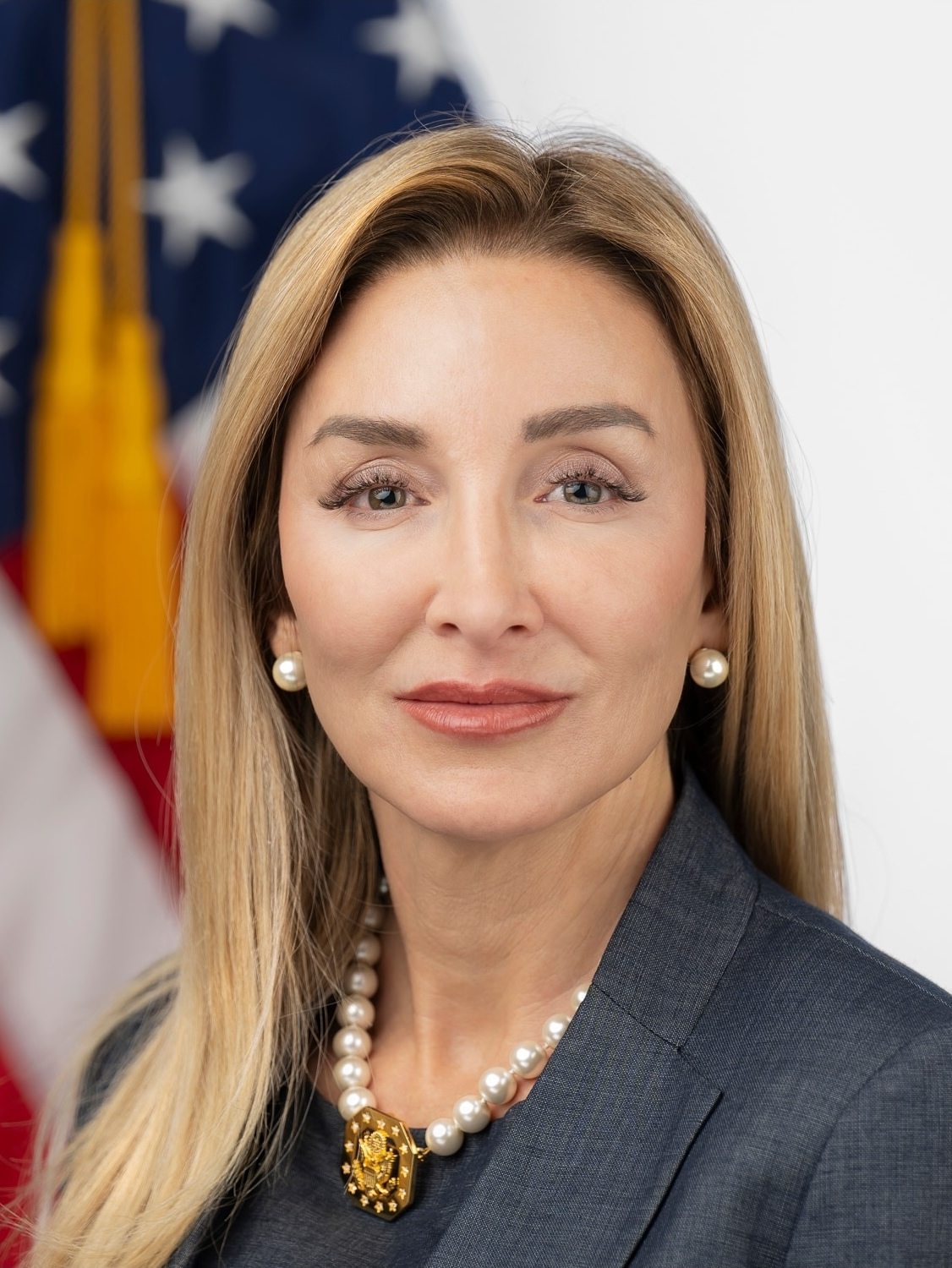
- Official portrait, 2025

Director of National Health Communications, Office of the Surgeon General
- Incumbent
- Assumed office May 20, 2026
- President: Donald Trump

Personal details
- Born: Stephanie Eleanor Bressan; 1973 or 1972 (age 53–54) New York, U.S.
- Party: Republican
- Spouse(s): First husband (divorced) Mike Haridopolos (m. 2005)
- Children: 3
- Education: Stetson University (BS); American University of the Caribbean (MD)

Stephanie Eleanor Haridopolos (née Bressan; born 1972/1973) is an American physician and public health official who has worked for the US Office of Surgeon General since 2025. President Trump has nominated Nicole Saphier to officially take the role as Surgeon General. HHS Secretary Robert F. Kennedy, Jr has delegated some responsibilities to Haridopolos and appointed her director of health communications.

== Early life and career ==
Stephanie Eleanor Bressan was born in New York in 1972 or 1973 to Fred and Angela Schneider. At age four, she had open heart surgery to repair a defect; she moved to South Florida with her mother three years later, after her parents divorced. She graduated from St. Thomas Aquinas High School, earned a Bachelor of Science in chemistry (as a member of Gamma Sigma Epsilon and the Mortar Board) with a minor in biology from Stetson University in 1994 and a Doctor of Medicine from the American University of the Caribbean in 1998, and completed her residency in family medicine from Albany Medical Center in 2001 or 2002.

In 2017, Governor Rick Scott appointed her to the Florida Board of Medicine. In December 2018, Florida Chief Financial Officer Jimmy Patronis appointed her chair of the Florida Healthy Kids Corporation Board of Directors.

In 2024, the University of South Florida College of Public Health named Haridopolos the Florida Outstanding Woman in Public Health, citing her work with Florida Healthy Kids Corporation.

In 2025, it was reported that Haridopolos had been named acting chief of staff and senior adviser to the U.S. Surgeon General. In May 2026, the U.S. Department of Health and Human Services listed her as Principal Deputy Assistant Secretary for Health and Director of National Health Communications in the Office of the Surgeon General. The Assistant Secretary for Health, Brian Christine, used delegation authority to allow Haridopolos to carry out duties of surgeon general.

== Personal life ==
Her first husband was a British national who she married while in London during her medical school rotations, and had a daughter and son with him before divorcing him due to domestic abuse. She is now married to Mike Haridopolos, the U.S. representative for Florida's 8th congressional district, with whom she has a third child.

Military offices
Preceded by Denise Hinton; Acting	Surgeon General of the United States; Acting; 2026–present	Incumbent
