= Charles Bronson (politician) =

American politician (born 1949)

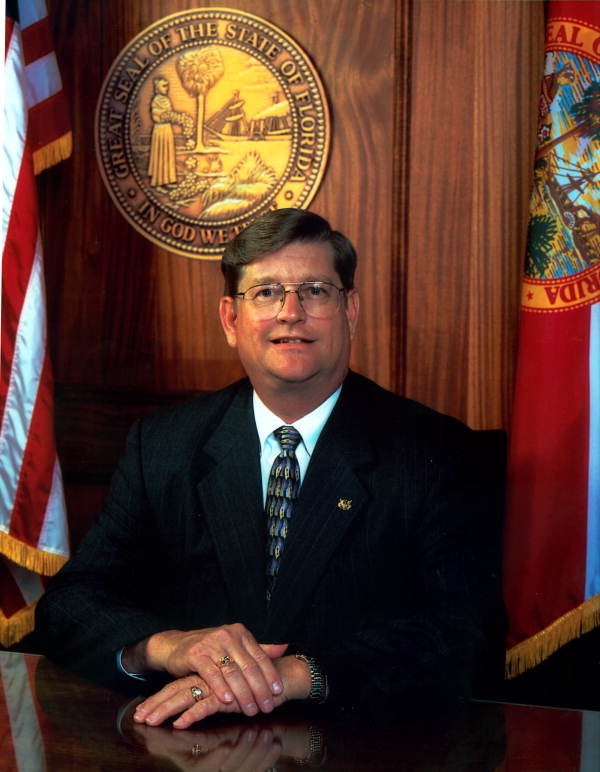

10th Florida Commissioner of Agriculture
- In office May 14, 2001 – January 4, 2011
- Governor: Jeb Bush (2001–2007); Charlie Crist (2007–2011)
- Preceded by: Terry Rhodes
- Succeeded by: Adam Putnam

Member of the Florida Senate from the 18th district
- In office November 8, 1994 – May 14, 2001
- Preceded by: Patricia Grogan
- Succeeded by: Howard Futch

Personal details
- Born: September 15, 1949 (age 76) Kissimmee, Florida
- Party: Republican
- Spouse: Regina Bolden
- Children: 2
- Education: University of Georgia (B.S.A.)
- Occupation: Rancher

Charles Hubert Bronson Jr. (born September 15, 1949) is an American public official who served as Commissioner of Florida Department of Agriculture and Consumer Services. He was appointed to the position in 2001 by Governor Jeb Bush, then reelected in 2002 and 2006.

Bronson attended Osceola High School and graduated from the University of Georgia in 1972, earning a B.S. degree in agricultural education and animal and meat sciences. From 1994 to 2001, Bronson was in the Florida Senate, representing Brevard County and Osceola County.

Party political offices
Preceded by Barbara Lindsey	Republican nominee for Florida Commissioner of Agriculture; 1986, 1990	Succeeded by James C. Smith
Preceded by Rich Faircloth	Republican nominee for Florida Commissioner of Agriculture; 2002, 2006	Succeeded by Adam Putnam
