= Florida's 45th House of Representatives district =

Florida district

Florida's 45th State House of Representatives district
Representative
Leonard Spencer; D–Gotha

Florida's 45th House of Representatives district elects one member of the Florida House of Representatives. It covers parts of Orange County and Osceola County.

== Members ==
- Carolina Amesty (2022–2024)
- Leonard Spencer (since 2024)
