= Florida's 16th Senate district =

American legislative district

Florida's 16th State Senate district
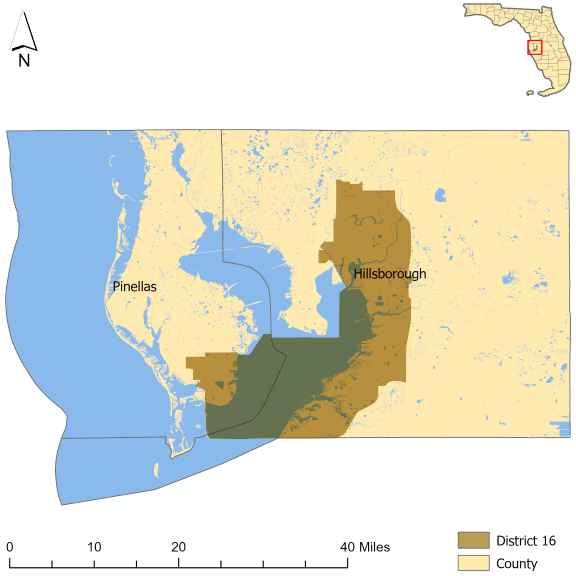
Senator
Darryl Rouson; D
- Demographics: 36.3% White; 36.3% Black; 23.7% Hispanic; 4.3% Asian; 1.8% Native American; 0.3% Hawaiian/Pacific Islander
- Population (2020): 535,448

Florida's 16th Senate district elects one member of the Florida Senate. The district consists of parts of Hillsborough, Pinellas counties, in the U.S. state of Florida. The current senator is Democrat Darryl Ervin Rouson.

== List of senators ==
NOTE: The following information was gathered from the Florida Senate website. Only records of senators from 1998-present are kept.

Portrait	Name	Party	Years of service	Home city/state	Notes
	Locke Burt	Republican	1991–2002	Des Moines, Iowa	Consisted of Part of Volusia county
	Jim Sebesta	Republican	2002–2006	Pontiac, Illinois	Consisted of parts of Hillsborough, Pinellas counties
	Charlie Justice	Democratic	2006–2010	Saint Petersburg, Florida	Consisted of parts of Hillsborough, Pinellas counties
	Jack Latvala	Republican	2010–2012	Oxford, Mississippi	Consisted of parts of Hillsborough, Pinellas counties; Redistricted to the 20th District
	Thad Altman	Republican	2012–2016	Macon, Georgia	Consisted of parts of Brevard, Indian River counties
	Jack Latvala	Republican	2016–2018	Oxford, Mississippi	Redistricted from the 20th District; Consisted of parts of Pasco, Pinellas counties; Resigned 1/5/2018
	Ed Hooper	Republican	2018–2022	Statesville, North Carolina	Consisted of parts of Pasco, Pinellas counties; Redistricted to the 21st District
	Darryl Ervin Rouson	Democratic	2022–present	New Orleans, Louisiana	Redistricted from the 19th District; Consists of parts of Hillsborough, Pinellas counties

== Elections ==
NOTE: The following results were gathered from the Florida Department of State. Uncontested election results are not provided.

Democratic Primary (1978)
Party	Candidate	Votes	%
Democratic	Bill Beck	12,351	33.7%
Democratic	Woodrow Wilson Storey	9,413	25.7%
Democratic	Glenn Turner	9,490	25.9%
Democratic	Nathan Z. Van Meter	5,414	14.8%
Total votes		36,668	100%

Democratic Primary Runoff (1978)
Party	Candidate	Votes	%
Democratic	Bill Beck	19,412	62.0%
Democratic	George Stuart, Jr.	15,864	52.1%
Total votes		35,276	100%

General Election (1978)
Party	Candidate	Votes	%
Democratic	Bill Beck	50,928	43.2%
Republican	Clark Maxwell, Jr.	67,051	56.8%
Total votes		117,979	100%

=== 1990 ===
General Election (1990)
Party	Candidate	Votes	%
Republican	Tim Deratany	54,444	48.0%
Democratic	Patsy Ann Kurth	59,030	52.0%
Total votes		113,474	100%

=== 1992 ===
General Election (1992)
Party	Candidate	Votes	%
Democratic	Clay Henderson	60,766	47.4%
Republican	Locke Burt	67,505	52.6%
Total votes		128,271	100%

=== 1994 ===
General Election (1994)
Party	Candidate	Votes	%
Democratic	Dan Webster	47,290	44.5%
Republican	Locke Burt	58,915	55.5%
Total votes		106,205	100%

=== 2002 ===
General Election (2002)
Party	Candidate	Votes	%
Republican	Jim Sebesta	87,204	64.2%
Democratic	Allison McInnis-Gimbert	48,670	35.8%
Total votes		135,874	100%

=== 2006 ===
Republican Primary (2006)
Party	Candidate	Votes	%
Republican	Kimberly "Kim" Berfield	16,092	58.8%
Republican	Frank Farkas	11,269	41.2%
Total votes		40,917	100%

General Election (2006)
Party	Candidate	Votes	%
Republican	Kimberly "Kim" Berfield	60,978	48.8%
Democratic	Charlie Justice	64,013	51.2%
Total votes		124,991	100%

=== 2010 ===
General Election (2010)
Party	Candidate	Votes	%
Republican	Jack Latvala	83,396	64.0%
Democratic	Nina Hayden	46,942	36.0%
Total votes		130,338	100%

=== 2012 ===
General Election (2012)
Party	Candidate	Votes	%
Republican	Thad Altman	143,459	62.8%
Democratic	Dominic A Fallo	84,824	37.2%
Total votes		228,283	100%

=== 2014 ===
Republican Primary (2014)
Party	Candidate	Votes	%
Republican	Thad Altman	25,581	65.2%
Republican	Monique Miller	13,657	34.8%
Total votes		39,238	100%

=== 2016 ===
Republican Primary (2016)
Party	Candidate	Votes	%
Republican	Jack Latvala	189,514	99.8%
Write-in Candidate	Katherine Perkins	452	0.2%
Total votes		189,966	100%

=== 2018 ===
Republican Primary (2018)
Party	Candidate	Votes	%
Republican	Ed Hooper	35,303	79.4%
Republican	Leo Karruli	9,141	20.6%
Total votes		44,444	100%

General Election (2018)
Party	Candidate	Votes	%
Republican	Ed Hooper	111,997	52.2%
Democratic	Amanda Murphy	102,407	47.8%
Total votes		214,404	100%

=== 2022 ===
General Election (2018)
Party	Candidate	Votes	%
Republican	Christina B. Paylan	52,927	36.1%
Democratic	Darryl Ervin Rouson	93,839	63.9%
Total votes		146,766	100%
