= Eastern Florida State College =

Community college in Brevard County, Florida, U.S.

- Former names: Brevard Junior College (1960–1970); Brevard Community College (1970–2013)
- Type: Public college
- Established: 1960; 66 years ago
- Parent institution: Florida College System
- Accreditation: SACS
- Endowment: $21.7 million (2024)
- Budget: $92.3 million (2024)
- President: James Richey
- Faculty: 236 (full-time); 489 (part-time)
- Undergraduates: 13,114 (fall 2022)
- Location: Cocoa, Florida, U.S.
- Campus: Small city
- Colors: Green and blue
- Nickname: Titans
- Sporting affiliations: NJCAA Region 8 – Southern Conference
- Mascot: Mr. Titan
- Website: www.easternflorida.edu

Eastern Florida State College (EFSC) is a public state college in Brevard County, Florida, United States. It is a member of the Florida College System and operates campuses in Cocoa, Melbourne, Palm Bay, and Titusville, as well as online programs through Eastern Florida Online. Founded in 1960 as Brevard Junior College, the institution was later known as Brevard Community College before adopting its current name on July 1, 2013, following the addition of bachelor's degree programs.

The college offers associate and bachelor's degrees, career and technical programs, and college-credit and vocational certificates. EFSC reports more than 150 academic degree and certificate options in areas including business, health sciences, nursing, public safety, computer technology, advanced manufacturing, and the arts.

Approximately 18,000 students take courses annually at EFSC campuses or online, according to the college. EFSC's 2026–27 catalog reported annual enrollment of 21,207 students during the 2025–26 academic year, including 19,617 college-credit students.

== History ==
Eastern Florida State College was established in 1960 as Brevard Junior College. Its first classes were held in the former Cocoa High School building, with an initial faculty of 31. Carver Junior College, a separate public two-year institution serving African-American residents of Brevard County during segregation, was also established in 1960. The two institutions merged in 1963.

The college was renamed Brevard Community College in 1970. Over the following decades, it expanded into a multicampus institution with locations in Cocoa, Melbourne, Palm Bay, and Titusville.

In 2012, the Florida State Board of Education approved the college's proposal to begin offering selected four-year degrees addressing regional workforce needs. The institution was renamed Eastern Florida State College on July 1, 2013, as it prepared to offer its first bachelor's degree programs.

Since 2012, EFSC has introduced more than 60 academic programs, including its first bachelor's degrees. The expansion has emphasized fields associated with regional workforce demand, including business, health care, nursing, computer technology, aerospace, and advanced manufacturing.

=== Carver Junior College ===
Carver Junior College was founded in 1960 as one of Florida's public junior colleges established to serve African-American students during segregation. Located in Cocoa, the institution operated separately from the then-all-white Brevard Junior College.

Carver and Brevard junior colleges merged in 1963 as Brevard County's public higher-education system began integrating.

== Campuses ==
EFSC operates four campuses in Brevard County.

=== Cocoa Campus ===
The Cocoa Campus is located on Clearlake Road and includes classrooms, laboratories, public-safety training facilities, performance spaces, and administrative and student-support offices.

The campus was formerly home to the Astronaut Memorial Planetarium and Observatory, which included a planetarium theater, public observatory, exhibit areas, and educational facilities. The planetarium closed following damage caused by Hurricane Irma in September 2017. The aging facility was demolished in 2022 after remaining closed for several years.

The Cocoa Campus is also home to the Harry T. and Harriette V. Moore Multicultural Center, named for Brevard County civil-rights leaders Harry T. Moore and Harriette Moore.

=== Melbourne Campus ===
The Melbourne Campus is located on North Wickham Road. It is home to a number of EFSC's bachelor's degree programs, athletic facilities, student housing, and academic and workforce-training facilities.

The campus also includes the Maxwell C. King Center for the Performing Arts, a performing-arts venue that hosts concerts, theatrical productions, touring performances, community events, and college commencement ceremonies.

EFSC has expanded the Melbourne Campus since becoming a state college, adding facilities supporting health sciences, public safety, student housing, athletics, and bachelor's-level education.

=== Palm Bay Campus ===
The Palm Bay Campus is located on Community College Parkway in southern Brevard County. It offers general education courses, degree and certificate programs, laboratories, student services, and career and technical education.

=== Titusville Campus ===
The Titusville Campus is located on North U.S. 1 and serves northern Brevard County. It provides general education, career training, academic advising, and other student-support services.

=== Eastern Florida Online ===
EFSC offers online courses and degree programs through Eastern Florida Online. Depending on the program, students may complete their coursework entirely online or through a combination of online, hybrid, and campus-based classes.

== Academics ==
Eastern Florida State College offers associate degrees, bachelor's degrees, career and technical programs, and certificate programs. Its academic offerings include the Associate in Arts university-transfer degree, Associate in Science degrees, Bachelor of Applied Science degrees, Bachelor of Science degrees, and the Bachelor of Science in Nursing.

Bachelor's-level areas of study include applied health sciences, nursing, computer information systems technology, and organizational management. Specializations are available in fields such as accounting, cybersecurity, data science, banking and finance, health care management, biomedical science, biotechnology, and medical imaging.

Courses are offered in several formats, including traditional classroom instruction, online courses, and hybrid courses. Many of the college's bachelor's degree programs are designed for students who have already completed an associate degree and for working adults seeking career advancement.

=== Accreditation ===
Eastern Florida State College is accredited by the Southern Association of Colleges and Schools Commission on Colleges (SACSCOC) to award associate and baccalaureate degrees. Its institutional accreditation was reaffirmed in June 2024, and the college is accredited through June 2034. A number of individual academic programs also hold specialized professional accreditation.

=== Transfer programs ===
EFSC maintains transfer and articulation agreements with public and private colleges and universities.

The college participates in DirectConnect to UCF, a partnership with the University of Central Florida that provides qualifying EFSC graduates with guaranteed admission to UCF, consistent with university policies. Admission to limited- or restricted-access programs may require additional applications, prerequisites, or academic qualifications.

EFSC also maintains transfer opportunities and articulation agreements with the Florida Institute of Technology and other institutions. Florida's statewide articulation system provides additional transfer pathways for students who complete an Associate in Arts degree.

=== Public safety education ===
EFSC provides education and training for law enforcement officers, corrections officers, firefighters, emergency medical personnel, and other public-safety professionals. Programs include state-approved training academies as well as associate degree and certificate options.

== Administration ==
Eastern Florida State College is governed by a District Board of Trustees appointed by the governor of Florida. The board establishes college policy and oversees the institution's administration.

James H. Richey serves as president of Eastern Florida State College. As of 2026, Ronald Howse serves as chair of the Board of Trustees. Howse was first elected chair in August 2022 and was reelected in August 2024.

Former trustee Alan Landman served on the board from 2009 until 2022 and held the chair position several times. He was succeeded on the board by Laura Moody.

== Athletics ==
Eastern Florida State College's athletic teams are known as the Titans. The college competes in the National Junior College Athletic Association and the Florida College System Activities Association.

EFSC sponsors 13 varsity sports:

=== Men's sports ===
- Baseball
- Basketball
- Cross country
- Golf
- Soccer
- Tennis

=== Women's sports ===
- Basketball
- Cross country
- Golf
- Soccer
- Softball
- Tennis
- Volleyball

EFSC teams have competed in state and national tournaments, and the college has hosted regional and national collegiate athletic events.

== Cultural and community institutions ==
=== King Center for the Performing Arts ===
The Maxwell C. King Center for the Performing Arts is located on EFSC's Melbourne Campus. The venue presents concerts, theatrical productions, dance performances, speakers, educational programs, and community events. It is also used for EFSC commencement ceremonies and other college functions.

=== Astronaut Memorial Planetarium and Observatory ===
The Astronaut Memorial Planetarium and Observatory operated on the Cocoa Campus for several decades. Its facilities included a planetarium theater, telescopes, exhibit halls, educational spaces, and a large-format movie theater.

The facility closed after Hurricane Irma affected the building in September 2017. EFSC subsequently determined that extensive repair and renovation would be required, estimating the cost at approximately $9 million in 2018. The structure was demolished in 2022.

=== WEFS-TV ===
WEFS-TV was a noncommercial educational television station operated by Eastern Florida State College. The station broadcast educational, cultural, public-affairs, and entertainment programming to audiences in Central Florida.

EFSC suspended WEFS-TV operations effective July 30, 2026, following the loss of two critical funding sources. The college stated that continuing to operate the station would have required diverting resources from academic programs, student services, and other institutional functions.
