= Lori Edwards =

American politician (born 1957)

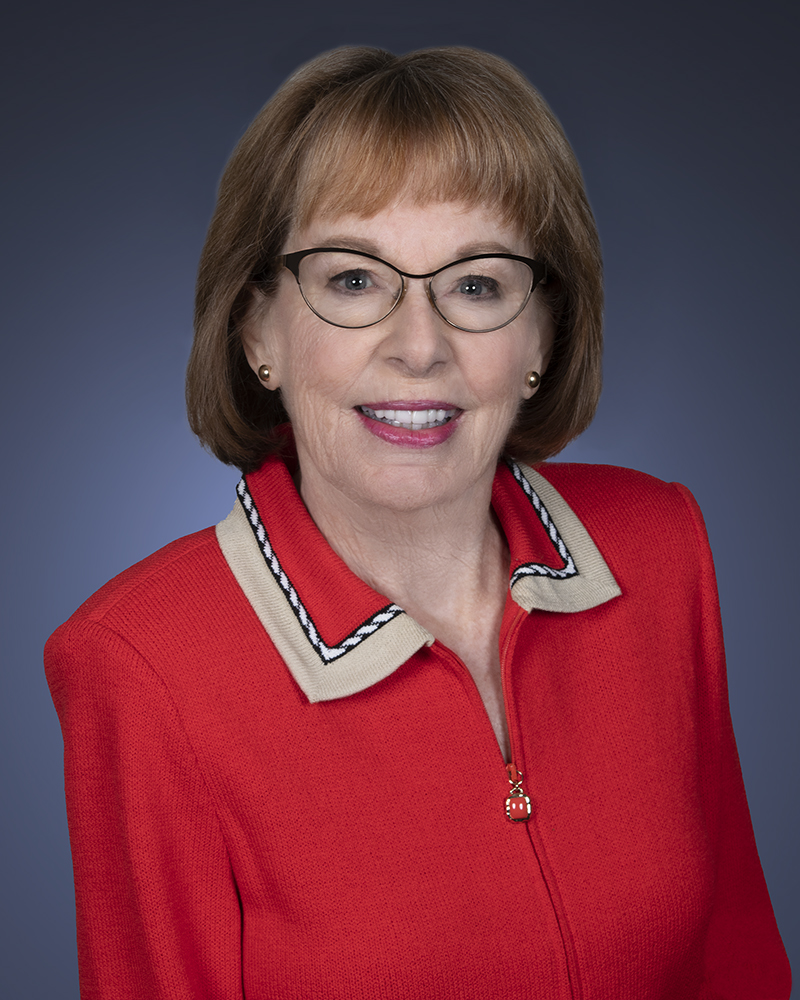

Polk County Supervisor of Elections
- In office January 2, 2001 – January 7, 2025
- Preceded by: Helen Gienau
- Succeeded by: Melony Bell

Member of the Florida House of Representatives from the 65th district
- In office November 3, 1992 – November 7, 2000
- Preceded by: C. Fred Jones (redistricting)
- Succeeded by: Marty Bowen

Personal details
- Born: April 7, 1957 (age 69) Jersey City, New Jersey
- Party: Democratic
- Education: Mercer University; Warner Southern College (B.A.)
- Occupation: Communications consultant

Lori Edwards (born April 7, 1957) is a Democratic politician from Florida who served as a member of the Florida House of Representatives from the 65th district from 1992 to 2000 and as Polk County Supervisor of Elections from 2001 to 2025. She was the Democratic nominee for Congress from Florida's 12th congressional district in 2010.

== Early life ==
Edwards was born in Jersey City, New Jersey, and moved to Florida in 1970, graduating from Sarasota High School in 1975. She attended Mercer University from 1975 to 1978, and graduated from Warner Southern College in 1992 with her bachelor's degree in business administration. Edwards worked as a communications consultant and political strategist.

== Florida House of Representatives ==
In 1992 when State Representative C. Fred Jones declined to seek re-election, Edwards ran to succeed him in the renumbered 65th district. She faced Tim Steorts, a programmer, in the Democratic primary, and she won the primary by a wide margin, receiving 63 percent of the vote to Steorts's 37 percent. In the general election, Edwards ran against Republican nominee Paul Senft, an insurance agent, and independent candidate John Paul Rogers, a barber. Edwards narrowly won the general election, receiving 47 percent of the vote to Senate's 45 percent and Rogers's 8 percent.

Edwards ran for re-election in 1994, and was challenged by Senft, in a rematch of their 1992 campaign. Edwards narrowly defeated Senft, winning 51 percent of the vote to Senate's 49 percent.

In 1996, Edwards was opposed by John Webb, the owner of a candy business in Winter Haven. Edwards defeated Webb with 53 percent of the vote. Webb challenged Edwards again in 1998, and she defeated him, 53–47 percent.

== Polk County Supervisor of Elections ==
Edwards was term-limited in 2000, and unable to seek a second term. She initially announced that she would run for Congress from the 12th district to succeed Congressman Charles Canady, but on October 7, 1999, she dropped out of the race. She announced that she would instead run for Polk County Supervisor of Elections to succeed Helen Gienau. In the nonpartisan primary, Edwards faced Barbara Osthoff, an administrator in the Supervisor's office, and Cassandra Fredericks, a former poll worker trainer. Edwards placed first, winning 39 percent of the vote, and proceeded to the general election with Osthoff, who placed second with 31 percent. She defeated Osthoff, winning 55 percent of the vote to Osthoff's 45 percent.

In 2004 and 2008, Edwards was re-elected without opposition.

In 2012, she was challenged by Colleen Burton, the former executive director of Polk Vision. Edwards defeated Burton with 73 percent of the vote. Edwards was re-elected unopposed in 2016.

Edwards was opposed by Debbie Hannifan, a developmental disabilities program coordinator, in her campaign for re-election in 2020. Edwards defeated Hannifan in a landslide, winning 78 percent of the vote.

In 2024, Edwards ran for re-election to a seventh term. Following a decision by the Florida Supreme Court requiring that elections for county constitutional officers be held as partisan elections, Edwards ran for re-election as an independent candidate. She was opposed by Republican State Representative Melony Bell. Bell narrowly defeated Edwards, winning 54 percent of the vote to Edwards's 46 percent.

== 2010 congressional campaign ==
Edwards ran for Congress from the 12th district in 2010, when Republican Congressman Adam Putnam opted to run for Agriculture Commissioner rather than seek re-election. She faced Doug Tudor, the 2008 nominee for the seat and a former U.S. Navy master chief petty officer, in the Democratic primary. Edwards defeated Tudor in a landslide, winning 75 percent of the vote to his 25 percent.

In the general election, Edwards ran against Republican State Representative Dennis Ross and Polk County Commissioner Randy Wilkinson, who ran as the nominee of the newly formed Tea Party. During the campaign, Ross called on Edwards to resign from her office, arguing that "she is unable to exercise her duties impartially and ethically," while Edwards accused Ross of "slinging mud."

Because of Wilkinson's campaign, and the possibility that it would siphon Republican votes from Ross, the district was seen by national observers and the Democratic Congressional Campaign Committee as one of the few opportunities nationwide to flip a Republican-held seat. The DCCC named Edwards to its "Red to Blue" list, and House Majority Leader Steny Hoyer and DCCC Vice-Chairman Debbie Wasserman Schultz both helped Edwards fundraise. Edwards ultimately lost to Ross, however, receiving 41 percent of the vote to Ross's 48 percent and Wilkinson's 11 percent.
