= 2014 Florida Commissioner of Agriculture election =

- November 4, 2014
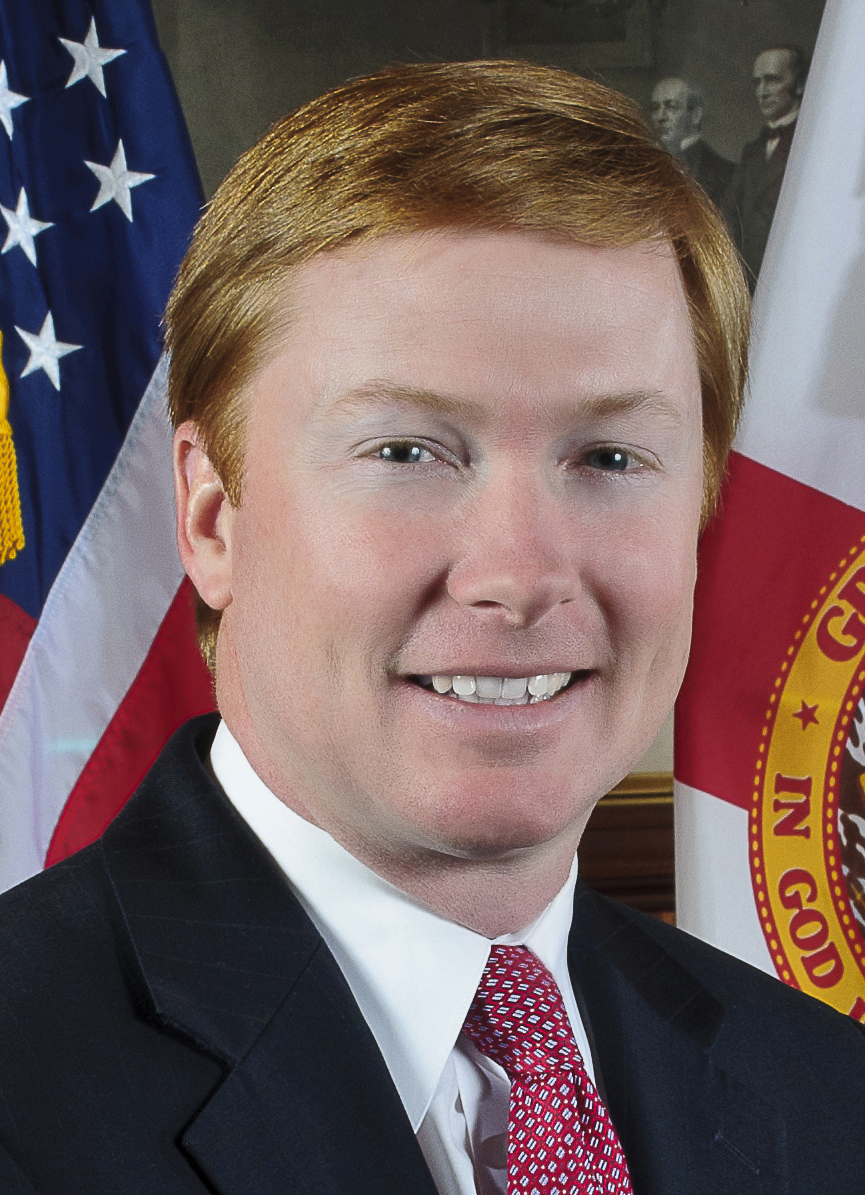

| Nominee | Adam Putnam | Thad Hamilton |
| Party | Republican | Democratic |
| Popular vote | 3,342,392 | 2,356,178 |
| Percentage | 58.7% | 41.3% |
- Putnam: 50–60% 60–70% 70–80% 80–90% Hamilton: 50–60% 60–70% 70–80% 80–90%
Agriculture
Commissioner before election
Adam Putnam
Republican
Elected Agriculture
Commissioner
Adam Putnam
Republican

The 2014 Florida Commissioner of Agriculture election took place on November 4, 2014, to elect the Florida Commissioner of Agriculture. Incumbent Republican Commissioner of Agriculture Adam Putnam was re-elected to a second term in office.

== Republican primary ==
=== Candidates ===
==== Declared ====
- Adam Putnam, incumbent Agriculture Commissioner

== Democratic primary ==
=== Candidates ===
==== Declared ====
- Thad Hamilton, Broward County Soil and Water Conservation District supervisor and Independent candidate for Commissioner of Agriculture in 2010

== General election ==
=== Candidates ===
- Adam Putnam (Republican)
- Thad Hamilton (Democratic)
- Jeffrey M. Obos (Write-in)

==== Endorsements ====
Adam Putnam

Organizations

- Florida Medical Association
- Florida Police Benevolent Association

Newspapers

- The Bradenton Herald
- The Bradenton Times
- The Florida Times-Union
- The Miami Herald
- Naples Daily News
- Orlando Sentinel
- The Palm Beach Post
- Sun-Sentinel
- Tallahassee Democrat
- Tampa Bay Times
- Tampa Tribune

=== Polling ===
| Poll source | Date(s) administered | Sample size | Margin of error | Adam Putnam (R) | Thad Hamilton (D) | Undecided |
|---|---|---|---|---|---|---|
| Public Policy Polling | November 1–2, 2014 | 1,198 | ± 2.8% | 49% | 38% | 13% |
| Saint Leo University | October 16–19, 2014 | 500 | ± 4.9% | 51% | 35% | 14% |
| Public Policy Polling | September 4–7, 2014 | 818 | ± 3.8% | 42% | 37% | 22% |

=== Results ===
2014 Florida Commissioner of Agriculture election
| Party | Candidate | Votes | % | ±% |
|---|---|---|---|---|
| Republican | Adam Putnam (inc.) | 3,342,392 | 58.65% | +2.71% |
| Democratic | Thad Hamilton | 2,356,178 | 41.35% | +3.20% |
| Write-in | | 203 | 0.00% | — |
| Majority | | 986,214 | 17.31% | −0.48% |
| Turnout | | 5,698,783 | | |
| Republican hold | | | | |

==== By congressional district ====
Putnam won 21 of 27 congressional districts, including four that elected Democrats.

| District | Putnam | Hamilton | Representative |
|---|---|---|---|
| 1st | 74% | 26% | Jeff Miller |
| 2nd | 58% | 42% | Gwen Graham |
| 3rd | 68% | 32% | Ted Yoho |
| 4th | 69% | 31% | Ander Crenshaw |
| 5th | 36% | 64% | Corrine Brown |
| 6th | 65% | 35% | Ron DeSantis |
| 7th | 63% | 37% | John Mica |
| 8th | 64% | 36% | Bill Posey |
| 9th | 51% | 49% | Alan Grayson |
| 10th | 65% | 35% | Daniel Webster |
| 11th | 69% | 31% | Rich Nugent |
| 12th | 67% | 33% | Gus Bilirakis |
| 13th | 63% | 37% | Bill Young |
| 14th | 48% | 52% | Kathy Castor |
| 15th | 69% | 31% | Dennis Ross |
| 16th | 63% | 37% | Vern Buchanan |
| 17th | 69% | 31% | Tom Rooney |
| 18th | 59% | 41% | Patrick Murphy |
| 19th | 68% | 32% | Trey Radel |
| 20th | 21% | 79% | Alcee Hastings |
| 21st | 44% | 56% | Ted Deutch |
| 22nd | 51% | 49% | Lois Frankel |
| 23rd | 43% | 57% | Debbie Wasserman Schultz |
| 24th | 16% | 84% | Frederica Wilson |
| 25th | 62% | 38% | Mario Díaz-Balart |
| 26th | 55% | 45% | Carlos Curbelo |
| 27th | 56% | 44% | Ileana Ros-Lehtinen |

== See also ==
- Florida Commissioner of Agriculture
