= Peter Dunbar =

Peter Dunbar may refer to:

- Peter Dunbar (cricketer) (born 1984), English cricketer
- Peter Dunbar (Florida politician) (born 1947), member of the Florida House of Representatives
