= Marty Bowen =

American politician

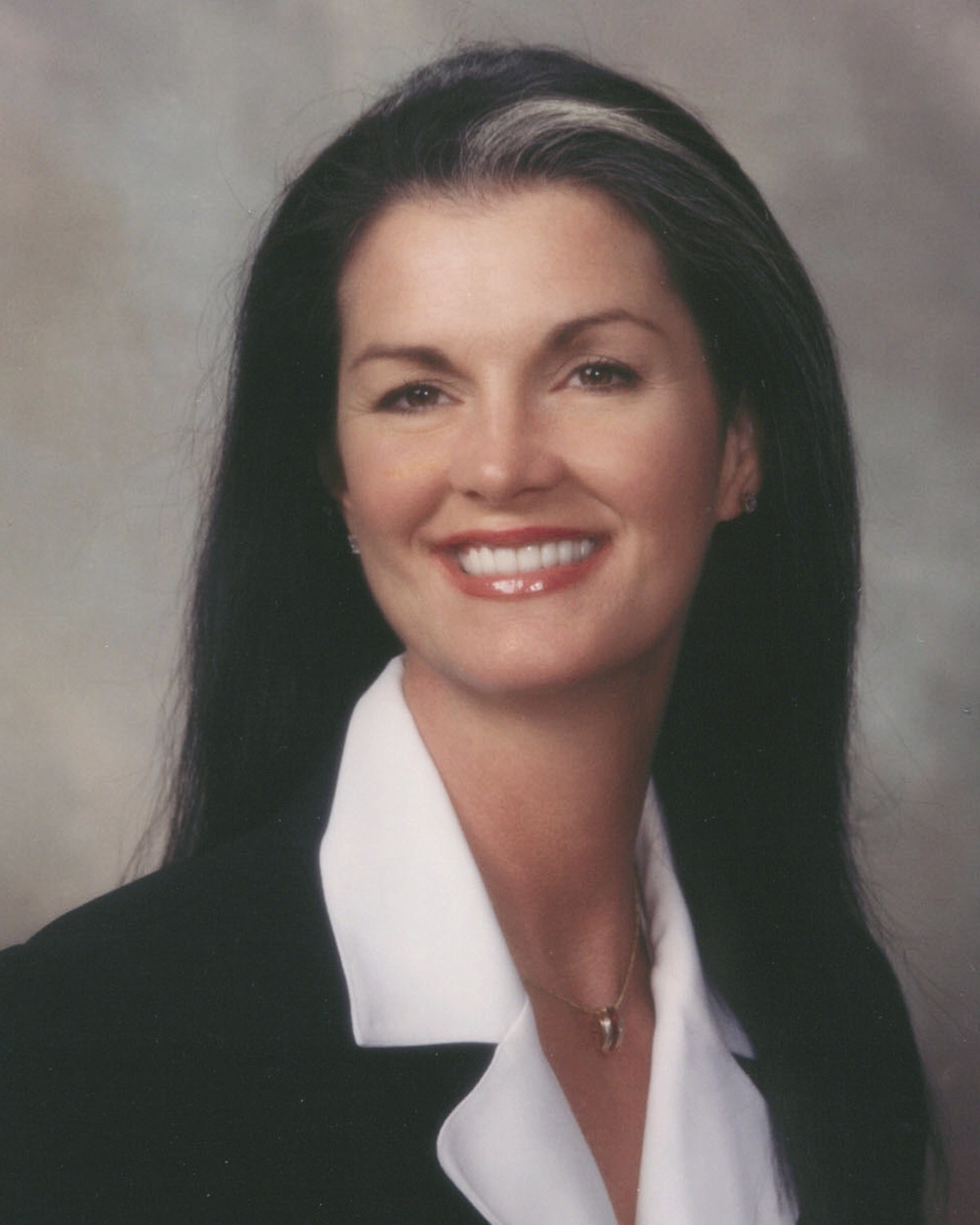

Speaker pro tempore of the Florida House of Representatives
- In office June 12, 2007 – November 4, 2008
- Preceded by: Dennis Baxley
- Succeeded by: Larry Cretul

Majority Leader of the Florida House of Representatives
- In office November 21, 2006 – June 12, 2007
- Preceded by: Andy Gardiner
- Succeeded by: Adam Hasner

Member of the Florida House of Representatives from the 65th district
- In office November 7, 2000 – November 4, 2008
- Preceded by: Lori Edwards
- Succeeded by: John Wood

Personal details
- Born: June 24, 1954 (age 72) Winter Haven, Florida
- Party: Republican
- Spouse: Brian Barnard
- Children: Stephanie Tomlin, Brian Barnard, Jr., Justin Jacoby, Christopher Barnard, Adam Jacoby
- Education: Southwest Miami Senior High School
- Occupation: Citrus Grower

Marsha L. "Marty" Bowen (born June 24, 1954) is a Republican politician who served as a member of the Florida House of Representatives from the 65th District from 2000 to 2008. She served as the Speaker pro tempore of the State House from 2007 to 2008 and as Majority Leader from 2006 to 2007.

== Early life and career ==
Bowen was born in Winter Haven, Florida, and grew up in Miami, graduating from Southwest Miami Senior High School. She joined her family's citrus business, Bowen Brothers Citrus, and served as vice president of the company.

== Florida House of Representatives ==
In 2000, when Democratic State Representative Lori Edwards was term-limited, Bowen ran to succeed her in the 65th district, which included Haines City and Winter Haven in central Polk County. She faced Earle Lee, the former President of Landmark Baptist College, in the Republican primary. Bowen defeated Lee by a wide margin, winning the Republican primary with 60.5 percent of the vote, and advanced to the general election, where she faced Haines City High School teacher Marlene Bozeman, the Democratic nominee. She defeated Bozeman with 54 percent of the vote, flipping the seat for the Republican Party.

Bowen ran for re-election in 2002 and won the Republican nomination unopposed. She faced Libertarian James Clifford in the general election, and defeated him in a landslide, winning 74 percent of the vote. In 2004, Bowen faced retired U.S. Air Force executive David Anderson, the Democratic nominee. She defeated Bowen by a wide margin, receiving 61 percent of the vote to his 39 percent.

Following the 2006 election, Bowen was appointed by State House Speaker Marco Rubio as the Majority Leader, and became the first Republican woman to hold the role in state history. Following the resignation of Speaker pro tempore Dennis Baxley in 2007 to run for the State Senate, Bowen was elected Speaker pro tempore for the remainder of the legislature's term.

Bowen was term-limited in 2008 and was unable to seek re-election. In 2007, she announced that she would run for state Commissioner of Agriculture in 2010, but she dropped out of the race in 2009, opting to focus on her business.
