= C. Fred Jones =

American politician (1930–2015)

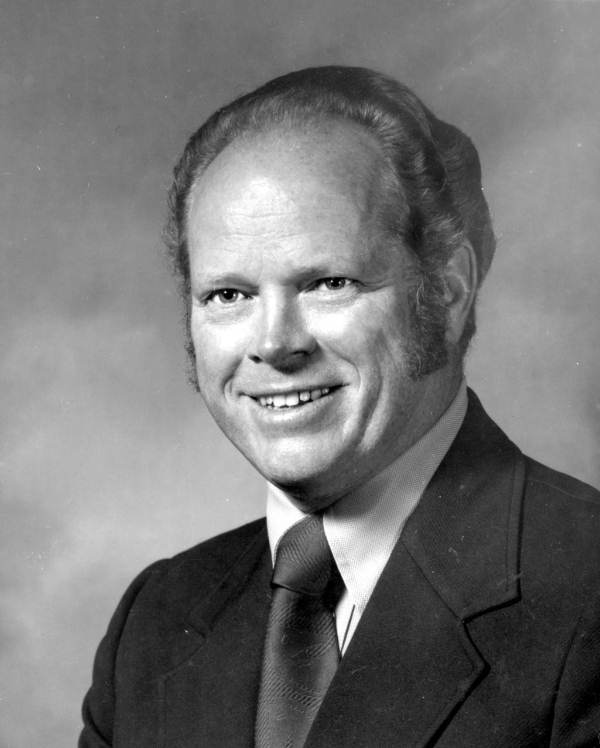

Member of the Florida House of Representatives
- In office November 3, 1970 – November 3, 1992
- Preceded by: E. C. Rowell
- Succeeded by: Lori Edwards (redistricting)
- Constituency: 59th district (1970–1972); 52nd district (1972–1982); 42nd district (1982–1992)

Personal details
- Born: April 19, 1930 Auburndale, Florida
- Died: July 9, 2015 (aged 85) Auburndale, Florida
- Party: Democratic
- Spouse: Vivian Juanita Cannon
- Education: University of Florida
- Occupation: citrus/cattle farmer

C. Fred Jones (April 19, 1930 – July 9, 2015) was an American politician in the state of Florida.

Jones was born in 1930 in Auburndale, Florida. He was an alumnus of the University of Florida, earning a B.S. and B.A. in 1952. He became a member of Alpha Kappa Psi Business Fraternity in 1950. After attending university, he served in Europe with the United States Air Force from 1952 to 1954. He was elected as Mayor of Auburndale in 1962 serving until 1964.

He represented Polk County and parts of surrounding counties in the Florida House of Representatives from 1970 to 1992. He was a Democrat.

Jones was married to Vivian Juanita Cannon, also a native of Auburndale; with her he had three children. His religion was Baptist and he was a farmer by profession, in the citrus and cattle industry. He was also a member of the local Auburndale Rotary Club and American Legion. Jones died at an Auburndale, Florida hospice on July 9, 2015, at the age of 85.

== Other awards ==
- Florida Highway Safety Alcohol Education Association Award for legislative support of traffic safety 1977.
- D.I. Rainey Award for outstanding contribution to the chiropractic profession 1978
- Florida Transportation Builders Association, Inc. commendation for outstanding service to the Governor's Advisory Committee on Transportation 1980.
- Florida Highway Users Federation special award for leadership in obtaining motor vehicle license tag revenue for highway improvement 1981.
- Farm Bureau Federation Legislator of the Year for outstanding service to Florida's agricultural industry rendered by a Member of the Florida House of Representatives 1972, 1983, and 1984.
- Allen Morris Award for Most Effective in Committee in the House runner-up 1977, 1980, and 1982.
- American Automobile Association Distinguished Service Award 1978 and 1981.
- Florida Citrus Mutual Outstanding Service to Citrus and Agriculture Award 1978 and 1983.
- Associated Self-Insurers of Florida Outstanding Leadership Award in the creation of Florida's new Workers' Compensation Law 1979.
- Florida's Beef Cattle Industry Appreciation Award for support and contributions. Florida Poultry Federation Appreciation Award 1984.
- Florida Fruit and Vegetable Association Outstanding Legislative Service Award 1984.
- Florida Phosphate Council, Inc. Appreciation Award 1984.
- Florida Chamber of Commerce Award for Leadership Excellence in passage of the Growth Management Act of 1985
- Florida Chamber of Commerce Annual Legislature Award for Leadership in Quality of Life Legislation 1986.
- Florida's Municipal Attorneys' Association of Florida Award for outstanding service and commitment to Florida's Municipalities 1987.
- Ridge League of Cities Legislator of the Year in the House of Representatives 1987
