= John Wood (Florida politician) =

American politician (born 1952)

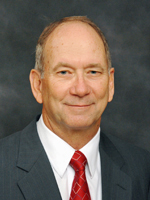

Member of the Florida House of Representatives from the 41st district
- In office November 20, 2012 – November 8, 2016
- Preceded by: Steve Precourt
- Succeeded by: Sam Killebrew

Member of the Florida House of Representatives from the 65th district
- In office November 18, 2008 – November 20, 2012
- Preceded by: Marty Bowen
- Succeeded by: Carl Zimmermann

Personal details
- Born: December 7, 1952 (age 73) Lakeland, Florida
- Party: Republican
- Education: Columbia University (BA); Florida State University (JD)

John G. Wood Jr. (born December 7, 1952) is an American politician who served as a Republican member of the Florida House of Representatives, representing the 41st district, which includes Winter Haven and Haines City in northern Polk County, from 2012 to 2016, and previously represented the 65th district from 2008 to 2012.

== History ==
Wood was born in Lakeland, and attended the University of Florida, though he did not graduate, instead transferring to Columbia University, where he received a degree in economics in 1974. Following that, he attended the Florida State University College of Law, receiving his juris doctor in 1977. Wood moved to Winter Haven, where he worked as an attorney and realtor, and founded John Wood Enterprises.

== Florida House of Representatives ==
When incumbent State Representative Marty Bowen was unable to seek re-election in 2008 due to term limits, he ran to succeed her in the 65th District, which included parts of northern Polk County and stretched to the county's border with Osceola County. Wood won the Republican primary unopposed and faced Bob Hagenmaier, the Democratic nominee in the general election. Wood raised significantly more money than did Hagenmaier, who opted to not accept any campaign contributions whatsoever, but only narrowly defeated him by 2,450 votes, winning 52% of the vote to Hagenmaier's 48%. When he ran for re-election in 2008, he only faced independent candidate Joshua Davis. Wood was reluctantly endorsed by The Ledger, which noted that despite his unremarkable voting record, he "has the better overview of the legislative landscape." In stark contrast to his narrow win two years prior, Wood defeated Davis comfortably with 67% of the vote.

In 2012, when the legislative districts were redrawn, Wood was moved into the 41st District, which contained much of the territory that he had previously represented in the 65th District. Wood was opposed in the Republican primary by Tea Party activist John Lindsey, who argued, "John Wood tends to represent the old special interests. He has not passed significant legislation." Lindsey proved no match for Wood, however, who defeated him in a landslide, winning 65% of the vote. Wood then advanced to the general election, where he faced Karen Cooper Welzel, the Democratic nominee. Welzel attacked the incumbent over his support for budget cuts in education, while Wood criticized her for focusing too much on social issues; he argued, "To me, the economy is the number one issue." Despite once again significantly outraising his opponent, Wood only narrowly won re-election, defeating Welzel by fewer than 2,000 votes and with 51% of the vote.
