= Sandy Safley =

American politician (born 1946)

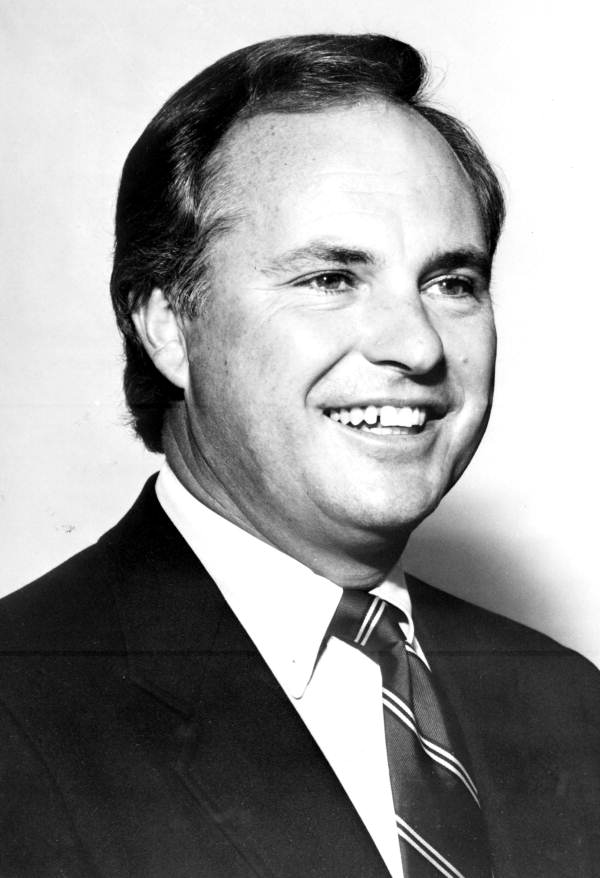

Member of the Florida House of Representatives
- In office November 8, 1988 – November 3, 1998
- Preceded by: Peter Dunbar
- Succeeded by: Gus Bilirakis
- Constituency: 50th district (1988–1992); 48th district (1992–1998)

Personal details
- Born: February 4, 1946 (age 80) Lebanon, Tennessee
- Party: Republican
- Spouse: Betty Ann Eichholt
- Children: 2
- Education: Middle Tennessee State University (B.S.)
- Profession: Businessman

R. Z. "Sandy" Safley (born February 4, 1946) is a Republican politician from Florida who served as a member of the Florida House of Representatives from 1988 to 1998.

== Early life ==
Safley was born in Lebanon, Tennessee, in 1946, and moved to Florida in 1952. He attended Middle Tennessee State University, graduating with his bachelor's degree in 1968. Upon returning to Florida, he was the executive assistant to Lieutenant Governor Ray Osborne, and the State House Minority leader. Safley settled in Clearwater, where he operated a real estate company and served on the Pinellas Sports Authority. In 1987, Governor Bob Martinez appointed Safley to the Marine Fisheries Commission.

== Florida House of Representatives ==
In 1988, Republican State Representative Peter Dunbar, a childhood friend of Safley's, declined to seek re-election so that he could serve as general counsel to Governor Martinez. Safley ran to succeed him in the 50th district, which included much of northern Pinellas County. He faced former Dunedin Mayor Mary Bonner and investment broker Jim Lockard in the Republican primary. Safley defeated both and won the primary by a wide margin, winning 52 percent of the vote to Bonner's 34 percent and Lockard's 14 percent. in the general election, Safley was challenged by Dave Wheeling, the Democratic nominee and an air-conditioner repairman. Safley defeated Wheeling in a landslide, receiving 72 percent of the vote to Wheeling's 28 percent. He was re-elected without opposition in 1990.

Following redistricting in 1992, Safley ran for re-election in the 48th district, which included most of the territory he represented. He was challenged in the Republican primary by Carl Zimmermann, a high school teacher. He defeated Zimmermann by a wide margin, receiving 65 percent of the vote to Zimmermann's 35 percent, and faced Democratic nominee Stephen Knowles, a drug treatment center director, in the general election. Safley ultimately defeated Knowles and won re-election, receiving 64 percent of the vote.

Safley was re-elected without opposition in 1994. He ran for a fifth term in 1996, and was challenged by Democrat Kevin Milford. Safley defeated Milford in a landslide, winning 69–31 percent.

In 1998, State Senator Jack Latvala considered running for Secretary of State, and Safley planned on seeking his seat in the State Senate if he did so. However, after Latvala declined to run, Safley ultimately decided to not seek re-election to the legislature. He was succeeded by Gus Bilirakis, the son of Congressman Michael Bilirakis.
