= José R. Oliva =

American politician

José Oliva
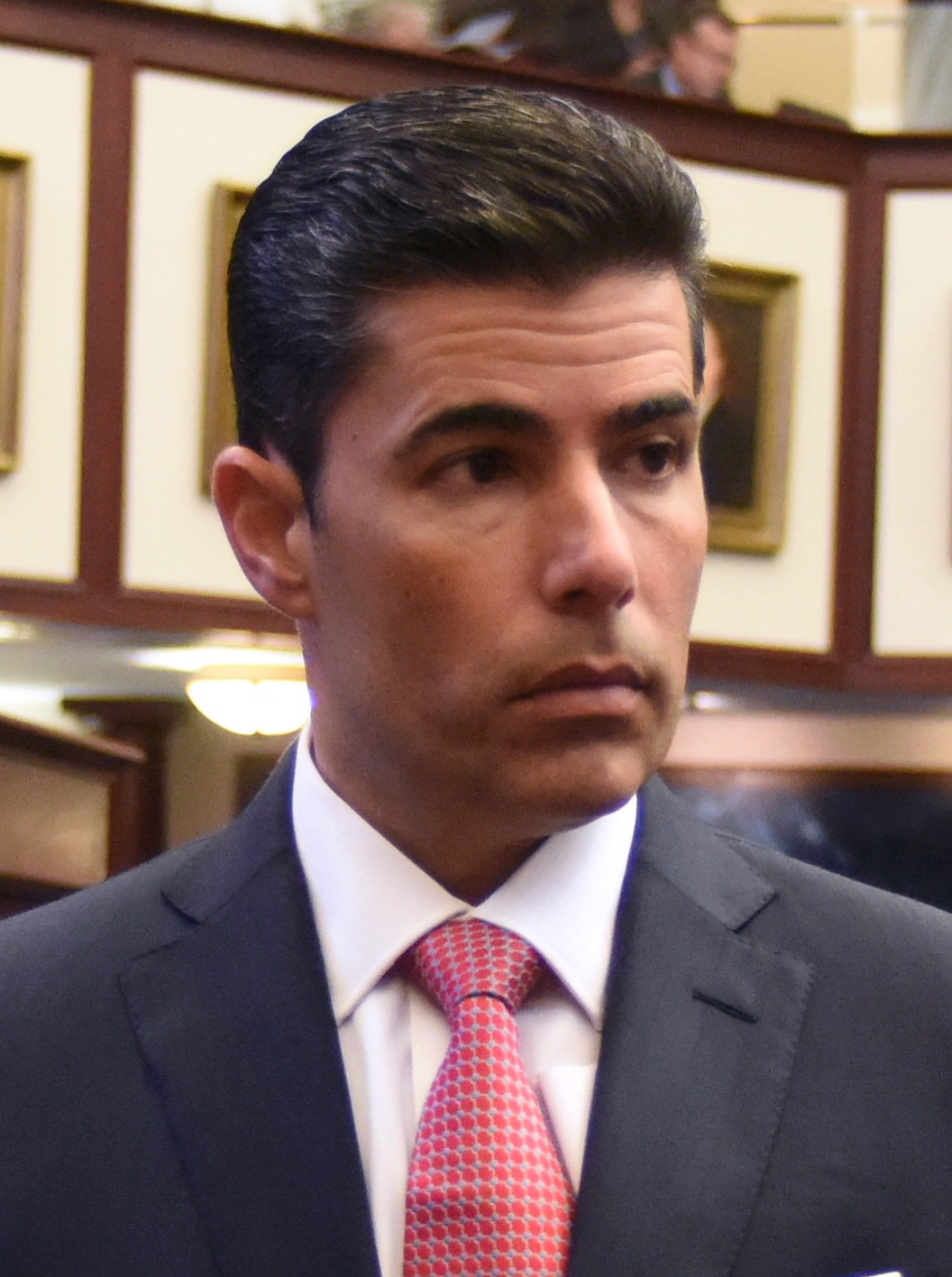

101st Speaker of the Florida House of Representatives
- In office November 20, 2018 – November 17, 2020
- Preceded by: Richard Corcoran
- Succeeded by: Chris Sprowls

Member of the Florida House of Representatives from the 110th district
- In office September 19, 2011 – November 3, 2020
- Preceded by: Esteban Bovo
- Succeeded by: Alex Rizo

Personal details
- Born: January 6, 1973 (age 53) Elizabeth, New Jersey, U.S.
- Party: Republican
- Spouse: Jeanne Oliva
- Children: 3
- Education: St. Thomas University

José R. Oliva (born January 6, 1973) is an American Republican politician from Florida. He served in the Florida House of Representatives, representing the Hialeah and Miami Lakes area in northern Miami-Dade County from 2011 to 2020. He was speaker of the House during his last term in office from 2018 to 2020.

== History ==
Oliva was born in Elizabeth, New Jersey, and moved to the state of Florida in 1974. He graduated from Hialeah-Miami Lakes High School, and later attended St. Thomas University, but did not graduate. Oliva founded a cigar manufacturing business with his brothers, and eventually served as its chief executive officer. From 2001 to 2005, he served as a Hialeah housing commissioner.

== Florida House of Representatives ==
When incumbent state representative Esteban Bovo resigned from the legislature to successfully run for the Miami-Dade County Commission in 2011, a special election was called to replace him. Oliva ran in the Republican primary against Frank Lago and Rafael Luiz Perez, emphasizing his support for "lower taxes, small and accountable government, [and] conservative family values." He ended up winning the primary, receiving 42% of the vote to Lago's 35% and Perez's 23%, and advanced to the general election, where he only faced write-in opposition. Oliva won the general election handily, winning 93% of the vote.

In 2012, following the reconfiguration of the legislative districts, Oliva remained in the 110th District, which retained most of the territory that he had previously represented. He was challenged in the Republican primary by Ileana Abay, but he dispatched her easily, winning renomination with 86% of the vote. In the general election, he once again only faced write-in opposition, and he won his second term with nearly 100% of the vote.

Following his re-election, Oliva received enough votes from his colleagues in the legislature to assume the position of Speaker of the Florida House of Representatives for the 2018–20 legislative session.

Oliva was term-limited from the House in 2020, after serving a partial term and four full terms.

Oliva served as Speaker of the Florida House of Representatives for 2 years (2018-2020) before being term limited out of office in 2020.

Oliva's legislative accomplishments were focused largely on demonopolizing the hospital industry and expanding the scope of practice for qualified nurses and nurse [practitioners to expand the supply of medical professionals.

In his first term as Speaker, Oliva accomplished what many described as an impossible task. He removed the requirement to be granted a "Certificate of Need" from State regulators before one could construct and operate a hospital. He met with fierce opposition from the "Hospital Industrial Complex,"

The certificate of need (CON) program, administered by the Agency for Health Care Administration (AHCA), requires certain health care facilities to obtain authorization from the state before constructing new facilities or offering certain new or expanded services. Health care facilities and services subject to CON review include hospitals, tertiary hospital services, complex medical rehabilitation beds, nursing homes, hospices, and intermediate care facilities for the developmentally disabled.

The bill repeals CON review for general hospitals, tertiary hospital services and complex medical rehabilitation beds effective July 1, 2019. The bill repeals CON review for specialty hospitals effective July 1, 2021. The bill requires the Office of Program Policy Analysis and Government Accountability (OPPAGH) to study and make recommendations for licensure standards for tertiary hospital services to the President of the Senate and the Speaker of the House of Representatives by November 1, 2019.

Oliva also saw the creation of the regulatory framework to allow for telehealth services to be legally provided to Floridians - expanding cost effective access to primary care across the State. (see HB 23)

He passed HB 713, the bill "Establishes reporting requirements for certain Child Protection Team medical directors, establishes battery against a patient or resident of certain health care facilities a disqualifying offense for certain health care licenses and employment in certain health care facilities, authorizes DOH to establish patient care networks to plan for the care of individuals with HIV, rather than only those diagnosed with AIDS,  authorizes DOH to adopt rules to implement the Conrad 30 Waiver program, extends the time for certain cancer centers to pursue a National Cancer Institute designation, revises DOH’s rulemaking authority relating to the minimum standards for ground ambulances, establishes requirements for maintaining and operating radiation machines and the use of radiation machines on humans, and more.

Oliva also passed HB 171 - "The bill requires the Board of Governors (BOG) to adopt regulations and the State Board of Education (SBE) to adopt rules to create a process that enables service-members and veterans of the United States Armed Forces to earn uniform postsecondary credit or career education clock hours across all Florida public postsecondary educational institutions for college-level training and education acquired in the military."

In 2020, the Oliva led House passed SB 7030 implementing the recommendations of the Marjory Stoneman Douglas Commission. Oliva and others took attacks from the right and the left on this issue. The original legislation has been modified in subsequent legislative sessions as can be seen here.

In February 2019, Oliva referred to pregnant women as a "host body" a total of five times during an interview with CBS4's Jim DeFede in Miami. Oliva apologized for the term, stating, "It was an attempt to use terminology found in medical ethics writings with the purpose of keeping the discussion dispassionate. The reaction undoubtedly shows it had the exact opposite effect. I apologize for having caused offense, my aim was the contrary."

Political offices
Preceded by Richard Corcoran	Speaker of the Florida House of Representatives; 2018–2020	Succeeded by Chris Sprowls
