= Dean Saunders (politician) =

American politician (born 1960)

Member of the Florida House of Representatives from the 63rd district
- In office November 3, 1992 – November 5, 1996
- Preceded by: Joe Viscusi
- Succeeded by: Adam Putnam

Personal details
- Born: March 17, 1960 (age 66) Clermont, Florida
- Party: Democratic
- Spouse: Gina Cain
- Children: 2
- Education: University of Florida (B.S.)
- Occupation: Real estate broker

Dean Saunders (born March 17, 1960) is a Democratic politician from Florida who served as a member of the Florida House of Representatives from the 63rd district from 1992 to 1996.

Saunders moved to Lakeland, Florida, in 1983, and served in the Florida House of Representatives for two sessions from 1992 until 1996 serving Polk County.

Saunders was born to a citrus farmer and raised in Clermont, Florida. He received a bachelor's degree in citrus management from the University of Florida. During his senior year at UF, Saunders earned his real estate license. The same year Saunders stepped down as a state legislator, he founded the real estate firm SVN Saunders Ralston Dantzler. He has held several executive positions in the Realtors Land Institute, an organization affiliated with the National Association of Realtors. He has brokered large land deals for conservation agencies and organizations.
