= Peter Nehr =

American politician

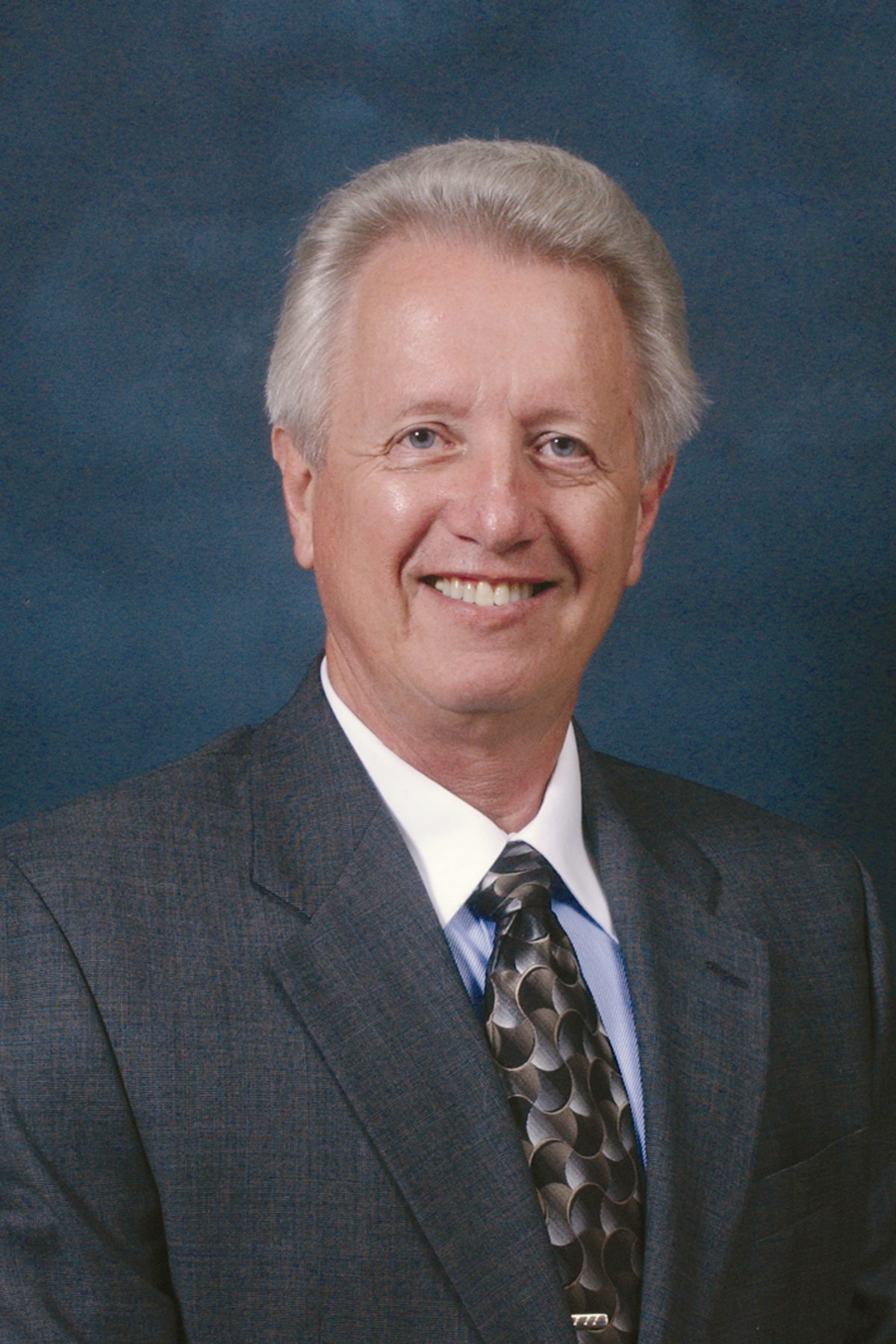

Member of the Florida House of Representatives from the 48th district
- In office November, 2006 – November 2010
- Preceded by: Gus Bilirakis
- Succeeded by: Carl Zimmermann (65th District)

Personal details
- Born: June 29, 1952 (age 74) Kapfenberg, Styria, Austria
- Party: Republican

Peter Nehr (born June 29, 1952) is an Austrian-born American politician and former Republican member of the Florida House of Representatives who represented the 48th District of Florida from 2006 to 2012.

== Biography ==
=== Personal life ===
Peter Nehr was born in Kapfenberg, Austria, on June 29, 1952, and began his education at the St. Petersburg Junior College, now known as St. Petersburg College. He completed a Bachelor of Science Degree in Political Science at the University of South Florida.

He owned a flag shop in Tarpon Springs, Florida, but filed for personal bankruptcy, facing a more than $300,000 cash shortfall.

In the spring of 2011, Nehr chose to close Fun City Sweepstakes in Palm Harbor, which he owned, after the Pinellas County Sheriff threatened to shut it down as a gambling establishment.

== Political career ==
Beginning in 2002, Nehr served two terms as City Commissioner for the city of Tarpon Springs, Florida, and on the Board of Directors of the Tarpon Springs Historical Society. He is also on the Board of the local Rotary Club. He was the organizer of Tarpon Springs' first Military Appreciation Day Parade. He served also as a Guardian ad litem in the State of Florida in Pinellas County.

In the 2006 election, Nehr narrowly defeated Countryside High School teacher Carl Zimmerman to become the Florida State House representative for District 48. During the 2007 session, he served on the Committee on Ethics & Elections, where he was vice chair. He won re-election to the Florida House on November 4, 2008 again by a narrow margin (51% to 49%) over Zimmerman. He was re-elected in 2010, defeating challenger Tom McKone, with 61.5% of the vote. In 2012, the district was renumbered as the 65th district; Nehr narrowly lost to Zimmerman, 54%-49%.

In 2014, Nehr was an unsuccessful candidate for a seat on the Pinellas County Commission; he finished second of seven candidates in the Republican Primary election, with 22% of the vote.

== Philosophical or political views ==
VoteSmart compiled Nehr's ratings by various groups. In 2008, he rated "100" compared with the position of the Associated Builders and Contractors. He was rated in the 90s with Associated Industries of Florida and the Florida Chamber of Commerce. In 2007, the Christian Coalition of Florida gave him a rating in the 50s., in 2008 in the 70s.

According to his campaign site, Nehr supported the "Homeowner's Insurance Bill of Rights", legislation mandating lower insurance premiums for those made improvements to their homes to strengthen them against tropical storms and sought lower insurance rates. He believes health care should be reasonably affordable and of high quality. He also said that tax-funded services should be cut to lower taxes.

== See also ==
- Florida House of Representatives
