= Karen Gonzalez Pittman =

American politician

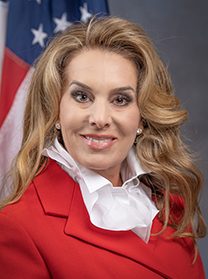

Member of the Florida House of Representatives from the 65th district
- Incumbent
- Assumed office November 8, 2022
- Preceded by: Chris Sprowls

Personal details
- Born: Karen Gonzalez
- Party: Republican
- Spouse: Christopher Pittman
- Children: 4
- Education: University of South Florida (BS, MEd)

Karen Gonzalez Pittman is an American politician serving as a member of the Florida House of Representatives for the 65th district. She assumed office on November 8, 2022.

== Education ==
Pittman earned a Bachelor of Science degree in elementary education and Master of Education from the University of South Florida.

== Career ==
Pittman worked as an elementary school teacher in the Hillsborough County Public Schools from 1985 to 1988 and a program evaluator for the Pinellas County Schools from 1990 to 1993. From 1993 to 1997, she worked as an evaluation coordinator for the Hillsborough County Public Schools. Since 2021, she has been the vice president of public affairs for Health Performance Specialists. She was elected to the Florida House of Representatives in the 2022 Florida House of Representatives election.

== Personal life ==
Pittman's husband, Christopher Pittman, is an interventional radiologist. The couple has four children.
