= Fulton–Montgomery Community College =

Community college in Johnstown, New York, U.S.

Fulton-Montgomery Community College
- Type: Public community college
- Established: 1963; 63 years ago
- Parent institution: State University of New York
- President: Gregory Truckenmiller
- Undergraduates: 2,001 (fall 2025)
- Location: Johnstown, New York, U.S. 42.9842°N 74.2946°W
- Campus: Rural, 200 acres (81 ha)
- Colors: Blue & white
- Nickname: Raiders
- Sporting affiliations: National Junior College Athletic Association, Region III, Mountain Valley Athletic Conference
- Mascot: Reggie
- Website: fmcc.edu

Fulton–Montgomery Community College (FMCC) is a public community college in Johnstown, New York. It is part of the State University of New York and serves Fulton and Montgomery counties. The college offers 45 degree and certificate programs, 30 campus clubs, and is a member of the NJCAA, offering Division III sports in basketball, soccer, baseball, softball and volleyball. In 2012, new dorms were added to the campus to serve local and out-of-town students.

== Notable alumni ==
- Carolyn Muessig, Chair of Christian Thought in the Department of Classics & Religion, University of Calgary
- Joe Viscusi, former Florida State Representative
