= Joe Viscusi =

American politician (born 1953)

Member of the Florida House of Representatives from the 44th district
- In office November 6, 1990 – November 3, 1992
- Preceded by: Charles Canady
- Succeeded by: Dean Saunders (redistricting)

Personal details
- Born: August 5, 1953 (age 73) Amsterdam, New York
- Party: Democratic (until 1993); Republican (1993–2004) independent (2004–present)
- Spouse: Joyce A. King
- Children: 3
- Education: Hudson Valley Community College; Fulton–Montgomery Community College (A.A.); State University of New York at Oneonta (B.A.); University of South Florida (M.A.)
- Occupation: Educator and real estate investor

Joseph Viscusi (born August 5, 1953) is an American politician from Florida who served as a member of the Florida House of Representatives from the 44th district from 1990 to 1992. Originally a Democrat, he switched to the Republican Party in 1993 and later became an independent in 2004.

== Early life ==
Viscusi was born in Amsterdam, New York, in 1953. He attended Hudson Valley Community College, and received his associate's degree from Fulton–Montgomery Community College in 1973. He then attended the State University of New York at Oneonta, graduating with his bachelor's degree in political science in 1975. Viscusi was a correctional officer at Central Prison in Raleigh, North Carolina, and moved to Florida in 1978, where he worked as a parole and probation officer in Polk County. He attended the University of South Florida, graduating with his master's degree in adult education in 1981, and subsequently worked as a teacher and school administrator.

== Florida House of Representatives ==
In 1990, when State Representative Charles Canady ran for the Florida Senate, Viscusi ran to succeed him in the 44th district. In the Democratic primary, Viscusi ran against attorney Jim Tanner, businessman Eugene Roberts, and retiree Robert Riscoe. He placed first in the primary, winning 44 percent of the vote, and proceeded to a runoff election with Tanner, who placed second with 27 percent. He defeated Tanner in the runoff, winning 56 percent of the vote.

In the general election, Viscusi ran against Republican Todd Thomas, a former Tampa Tribune reporter and president of the Florida Employers Safety Association. He defeated Thomas by a narrow margin, winning 51 percent of the vote to Thomas's 49 percent.

Viscusi considered running for the Florida Senate in 1992 when State Senator Quillian Yancey declined to seek re-election, but ultimately decided to seek re-election in the 63rd district. He was challenged in the Democratic primary by Dean Saunders, a former staffer to Governor Lawton Chiles, and businessman Gene Roberts. Viscusi referred to Saunders as "the governor's boy," and argued that he "carpetbagged" into the district as retribution for voting against Chiles's budget proposal. Viscusi placed first in the primary, winning 45 percent of the vote to Saunders's 38 percent, and they proceeded to a runoff election. Following a contentious campaign. Saunders defeated Viscusi with 57 percent of the vote.

== Post-legislative career ==
After leaving the legislature, Viscusi switched to the Republican Party. He ran against Saunders in 1994 as a Republican, and won the primary unopposed. Saunders defeated Viscusi with 55 percent of the vote.

In 2004, Viscusi announced that he would run for the Polk County Commission from the 1st district. However, four months later, dropped out of the race before qualifying, citing his acceptance to law school. Later that year, he left the Republican Party.

Viscusi ran as an independent against Republican Congressman Adam Putnam in 2006. He campaigned with a Howdy Doody puppet, which he named "Adam Puppet," and emphasized his own independence. Despite Viscusi's criticism of Lawton Chiles when he was a legislator, Chiles's widow, Rhea Chiles, endorsed Viscusi. Putnam won re-election by a wide margin, receivint 69 percent of the vote to Viscusi's 19 percent and independent Ed Bowlin's 12 percent.
