= Chris Sprowls =

Florida State Representative

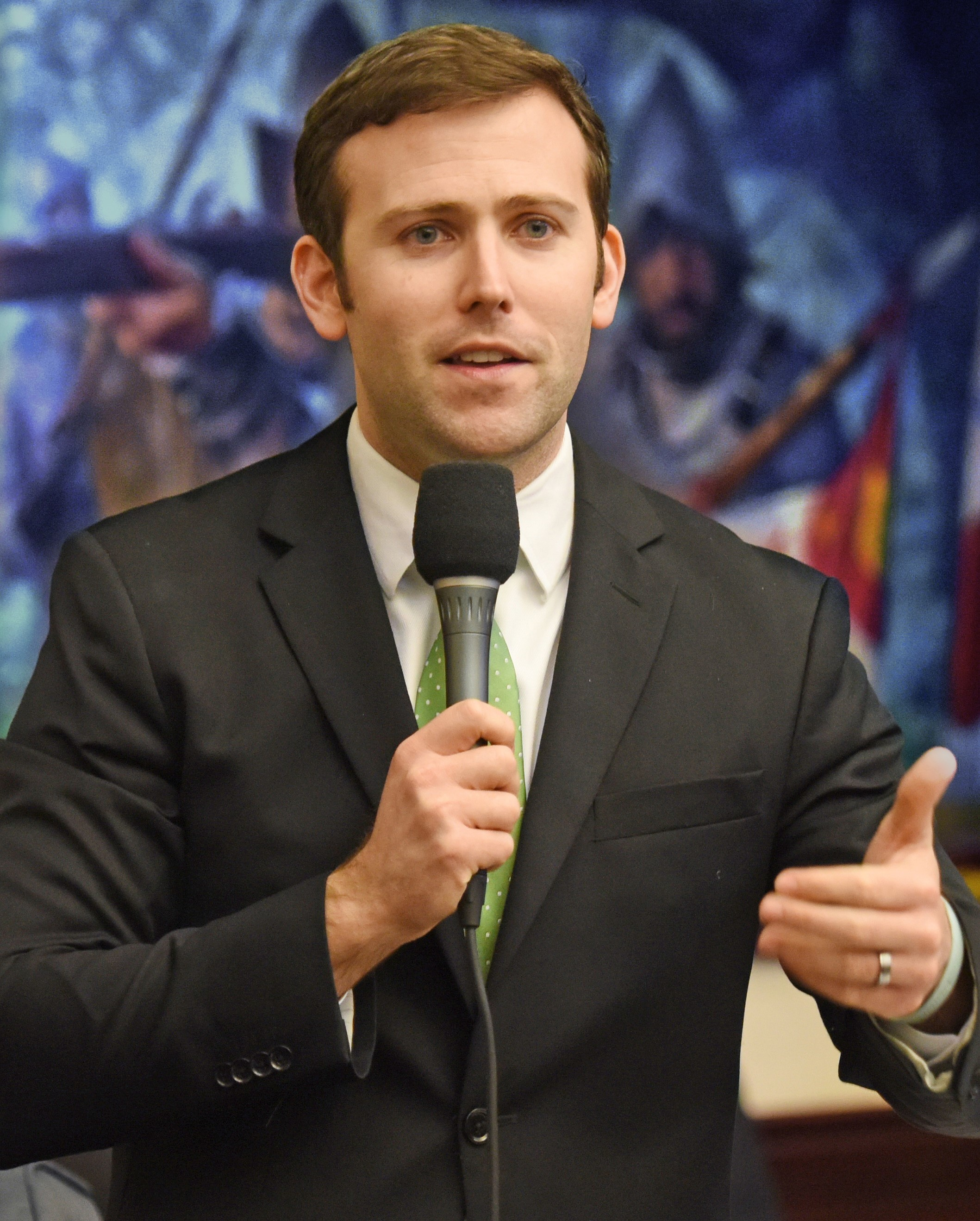

102nd Speaker of the Florida House of Representatives
- In office November 17, 2020 – November 22, 2022
- Preceded by: José R. Oliva
- Succeeded by: Paul Renner

Member of the Florida House of Representatives from the 65th district
- In office November 4, 2014 – November 8, 2022
- Preceded by: Carl Zimmermann
- Succeeded by: Karen Gonzalez Pittman

Personal details
- Born: Christopher Joseph Sprowls; January 14, 1984 (age 42) Newburgh, New York, U.S.
- Party: Republican
- Spouse: Shannon Long
- Education: University of South Florida (BA); Stetson University (JD)

Christopher Joseph Sprowls (born January 14, 1984) is an American attorney and Republican politician from Florida. He served as speaker of the Florida House of Representatives for the 2020–22 legislative term and represented the 65th District, which included Clearwater, Dunedin, and Tarpon Springs in northern Pinellas County, from 2014–22.

== History ==
Sprowls was born in Newburgh, New York, and moved to the state of Florida in his childhood. During his time in high school, he was diagnosed with Hodgkin's lymphoma, which he survived. After Sprowls graduated from high school Genesis Preparatory in 2002, he attended the University of South Florida, graduating with his bachelor's degree in 2006, and then the Stetson University College of Law, receiving his Juris Doctor in 2009. He then served as an Assistant State Attorney for the Sixth Judicial Circuit, which is located in Pasco County and Pinellas County. In 2013, Sprowls tried William Hurst, who was ultimately convicted of murdering his wife thirty years prior and was put on trial after the body was found in 2011. He then worked within the State Attorney's Office as a special prosecutor in the Gang Unit and as the Director of the Veterans Treatment Court.

== Florida House of Representatives ==
In 2014, incumbent State Representative Carl Zimmermann, a Democrat, ran for re-election in the 65th District, so Sprowls ran against him. He faced fellow attorney Debbie Ann Faulkner in the Republican primary. The Tampa Tribune endorsed Sprowls over Faulkner, which noted that, though "both candidates bring intelligence and passion to the race," Sprowls "is the more polished candidate and appears ready to serve on day one if elected." Sprowls ended up defeating Faulkner by a wide margin, winning 65% of the vote, and advanced to the general election, where he faced Zimmermann. Sprowls campaigned on his opposition to Medicaid expansion provided for under the Affordable Care Act, his support for charter schools, and his opposition to abortion. Ultimately, owing to the tendency of the district to vote for Republican candidates, Sprowls unseated Zimmermann, winning his first term in the legislature with 52% of the vote.

On September 17, 2019, Sprowls was chosen by his Republican colleagues to be the speaker of the Florida House for the 2020–2022 legislative term. The full House formally elected him speaker on November 17, 2020, after the 2020 elections.

During the 2020 elections, amid the COVID-19 pandemic, he participated in indoors Donald Trump campaign events where attendees and participants did not wear masks or socially distance.

In 2021, Sprowls praised Florida Governor Ron DeSantis for his handling of the COVID-19 pandemic.

After Florida voters voted in favor of a referendum to restore the voting rights of felons, Sprowls and other Republicans restricted this so that felons who had outstanding fines would not regain their voting rights. Sprowls argued that this restriction did not amount to a "poll tax", arguing that poll taxes had racial implications.

Political offices
Preceded by José R. Oliva	Speaker of the Florida House of Representatives; 2020–2022	Succeeded by Paul Renner
