= Congressional App Challenge =

Science competition in the US for middle and high schoolers

The Congressional Science Technology, Engineering and Math (STEM) Academic Competition, also known as the House App Contest or Congressional App Challenge (CAC), allows middle and high school students in participating congressional districts to compete in an annual application software ("app") development contest. Students are encouraged to design an app using any programming language on any platform, with no limits on topic or function. Winners from congressional districts have their apps featured online and in the United States Capitol Building and are invited to attend the annual #HouseofCode event.

== History ==
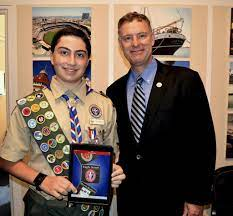
Congressman Scott Peters with Jake Chasan after winning the Inaugural Congressional STEM Competition in 2014.

The challenge was established by the United States House of Representatives in 2013 under the "Academic Competition Resolution of 2013" as a bipartisan effort to engage student creativity and participation in STEM education fields in a similar fashion as the Congressional Art Competition. The resolution passed with 99% support – a vote of 411 to 3 and outlined how and at what interval the competition would be hosted. The Congressional Internet Caucus Advisory Committee introduced the concept for the Congressional App Challenge in 2013 and the challenge was co-chaired by Congressional Internet Caucus co-chairs Rep. Bob Goodlatte and Rep. Anna Eshoo. Today, the Congressional App Challenge is managed by the non-profit organization, the Internet Education Foundation, in partnership with the House of Representatives. In its inaugural year, 84 congressional districts in 31 states and DC recognized 212 students for creating 109 apps. The 2023 Challenge had 11,334 students submit 3,645 apps in 374 congressional districts.

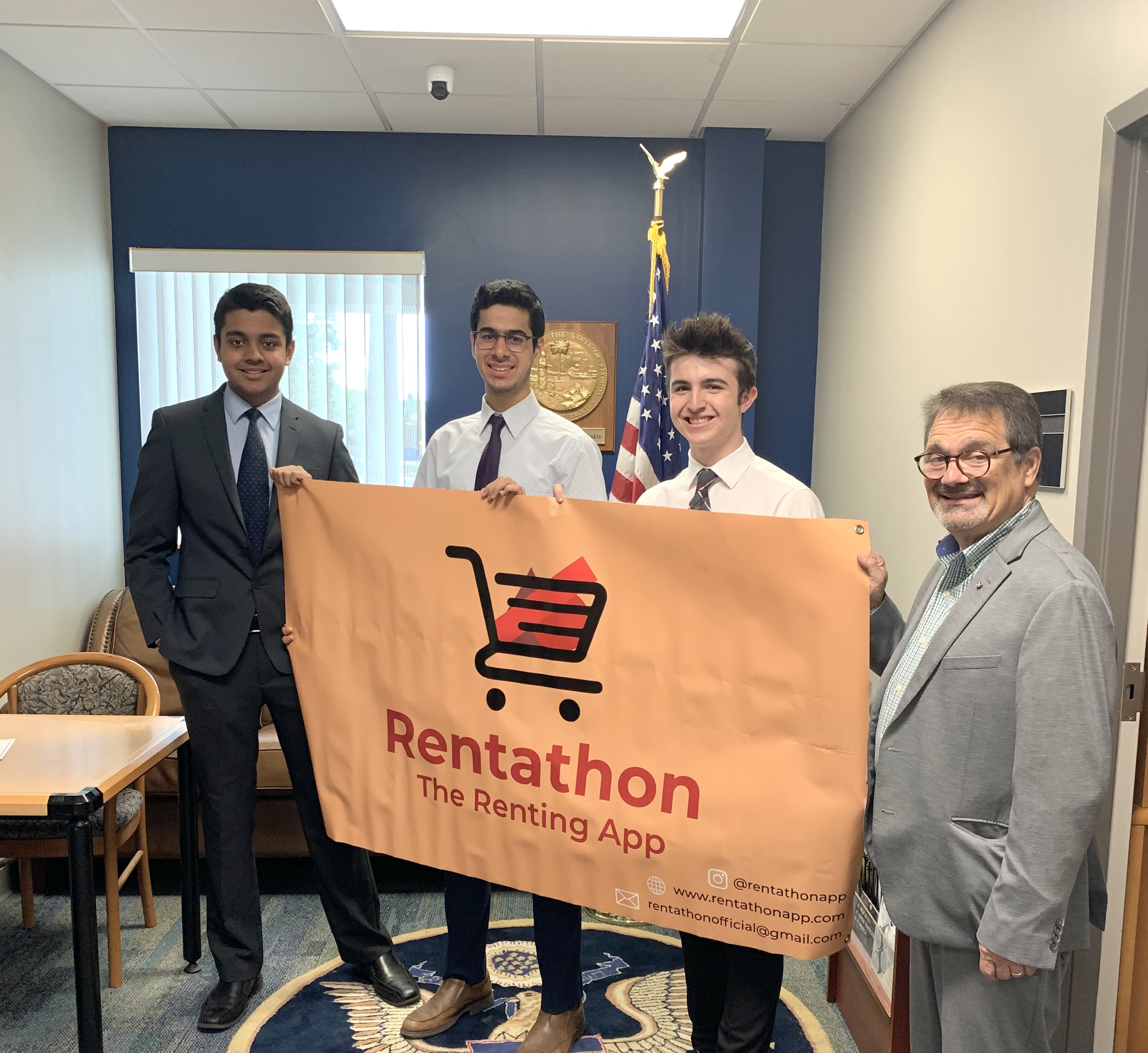
Congressman Gus Bilirakis with Ayush Pai, Alex Kranias, and Krish Asknani after winning the Congressional App Challenge with their app Rentathon.

== Demographics ==
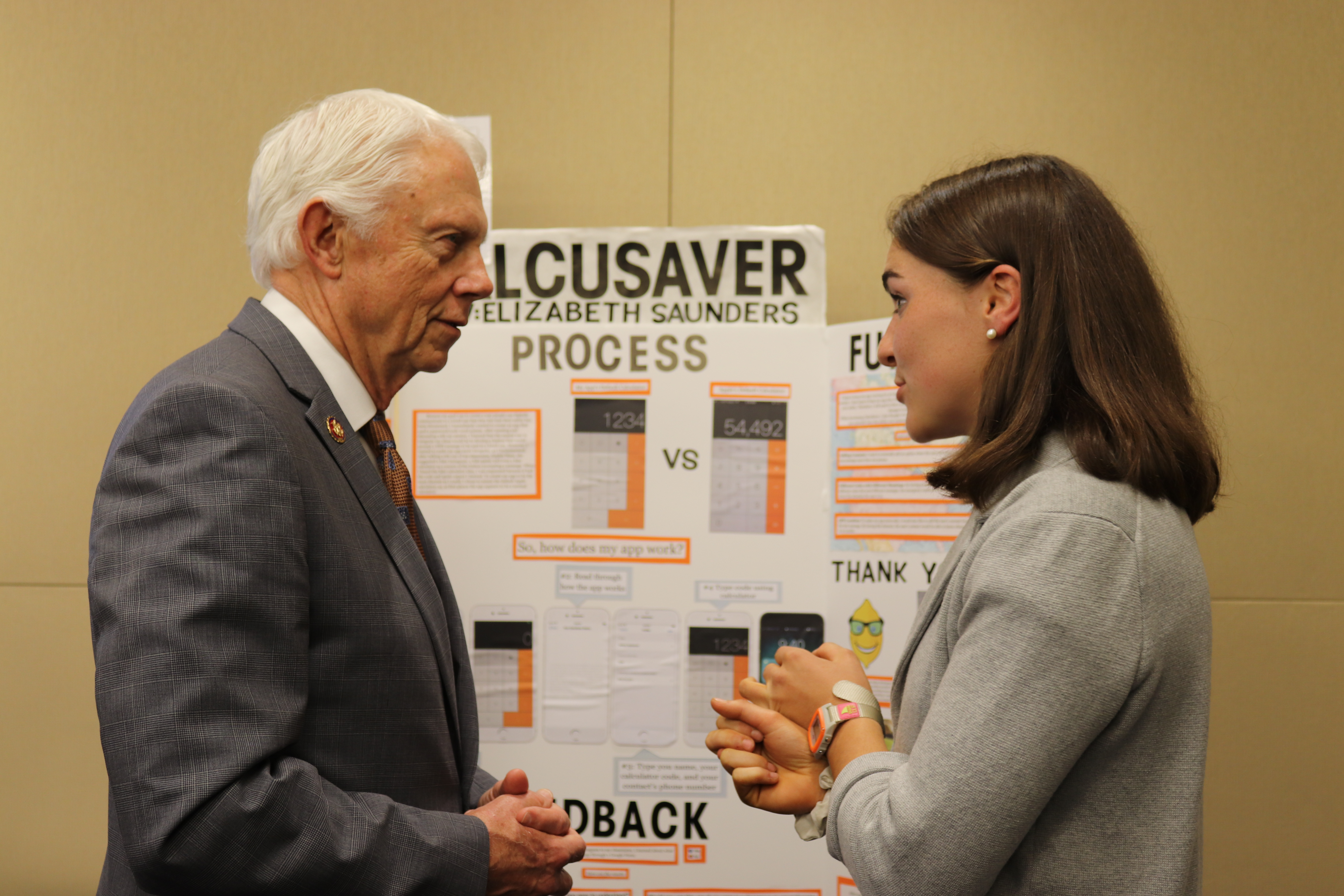
A student demonstrates her app to a member of Congress.

With its focus on increasing diversity and inclusion within the computer science field, the Congressional App Challenge enrolls a large number of underrepresented minority, female, and rural students with various experience in coding. In 2018, 8% of participants were Black, 15% Hispanic, and 3% American Indian, and 36% of participants were female. Almost half of students indicated that they had no experience or were beginners in coding before participating in the Congressional App Challenge. Geographically, participants come from all around the United States and its territories, including Alaska, California, New York, Missouri, Puerto Rico, and the Northern Mariana Islands.

== Co-Chairs ==
The first official Congressional App Challenge launched under the leadership of the inaugural CAC Co-Chairs Reps. Mimi Walters (R-CA) and Hakeem Jeffries (D-NY). Reps. Ed Royce (R-CA) and Seth Moulton (D-MA) took over as co-chairs in 2016, and in the first two years of the Challenge, the CAC reached nearly 4,000 students across 33 states. Reps. Tim Ryan (D-OH) and Ileana Ros-Lehtinen (R-FL) took over as co-chairs in 2017. In 2018 Representatives Suzan DelBene (D-WA) and French Hill (R-AK) became the co-chairs for a two year term. Reps. Jennifer Wexton (D-VA) and Young Kim (R-CA) chair the competition for the 117th Congress. Reps. Ted Lieu (D-CA) and Zach Nunn (R-IA) chair the completion for the 118th Congress. In the first eight years of the Challenge, the CAC has inspired over 50,000 students across all 50 states to code for congress.

== #HouseofCode ==
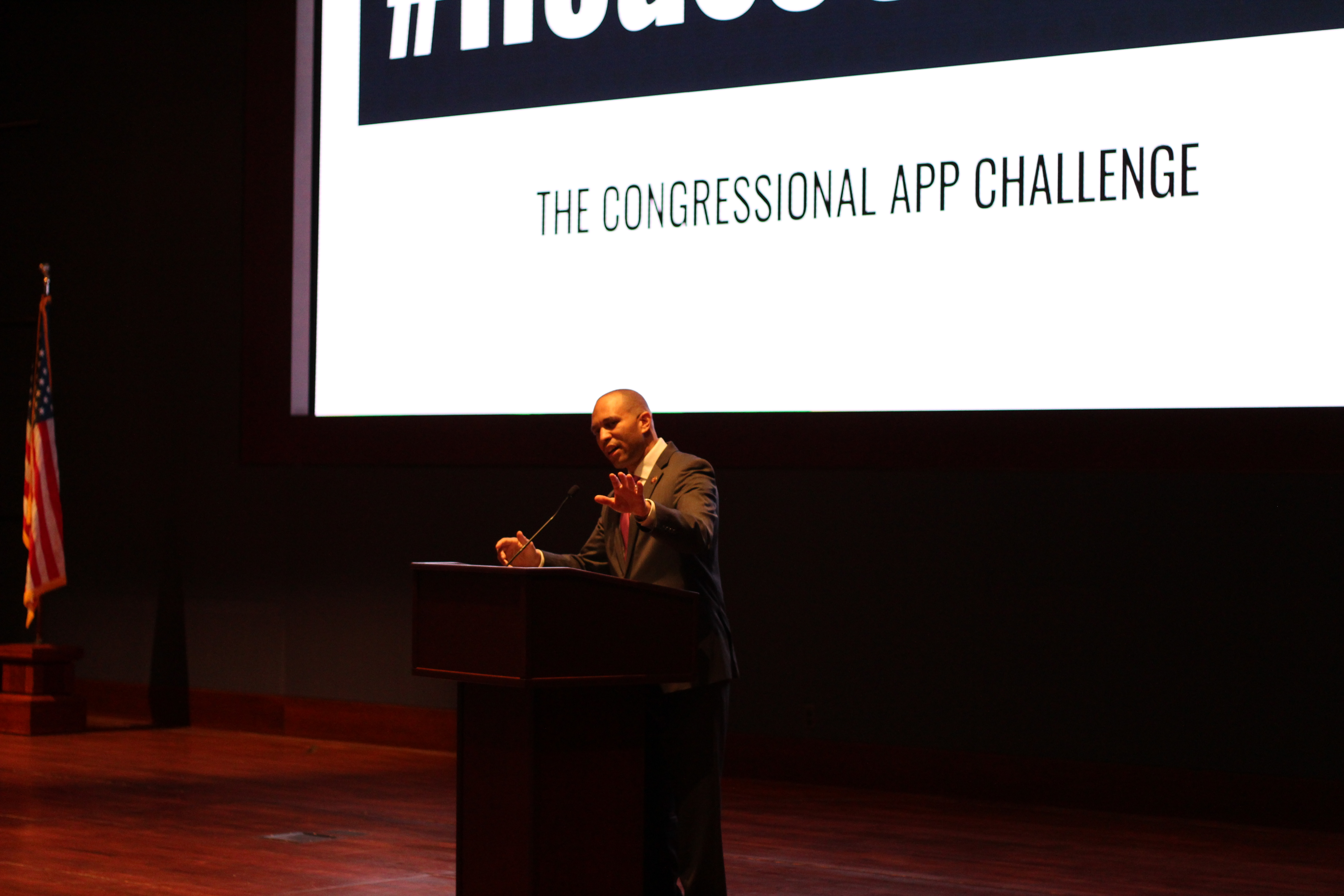
House Minority Leader Hakeem Jeffries speaks at the 2019 #HouseofCode.

Every Spring, the Congressional App Challenge hosts #HouseofCode in Washington D.C. The event is considered the national computer science fair, and winners from all participating congressional districts are invited to attend. During #HouseofCode, students demonstrate their apps to members from the House of Representatives, hear from speakers, and meet professionals from the Washington D.C. technology community. Attendees are encouraged to meet with their peers and connect with sponsors, partners, and other community organizations to discuss pathways in STEM.
