= E. C. Rowell =

American politician

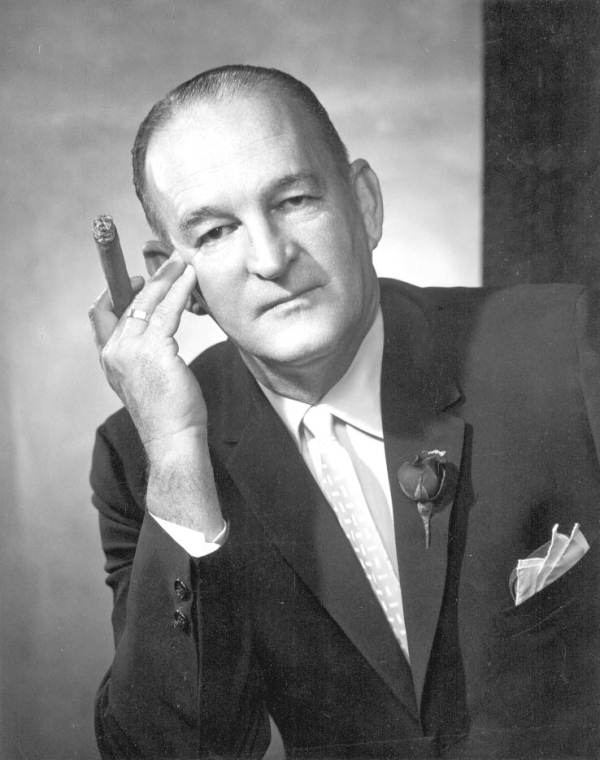

Member of the Florida House of Representatives from the Sumter County district
- In office 1957–1970

Personal details
- Born: October 1, 1914 Oxford, Florida, U.S.
- Died: September 14, 1992 (aged 77) Wildwood, Florida, U.S.
- Party: Democratic
- Education: University of Florida
- Occupation: farmer, cattleman

E. C. Rowell (October 1, 1914 – September 14, 1992) was a politician in the American state of Florida. He served in the Florida House of Representatives from 1966 to 1968, representing the 79th district. He served as Speaker from 1965 to 1967.
