= Peter Dunbar (cricketer) =

English cricketer (born 1984)

Personal information
- Full name: Peter Raymond Dunbar
- Born: 18 September 1984 (age 42); Harrow, London, England
- Batting: Right-handed
- Bowling: Right-arm medium

Domestic team information
- Years: Team
- 2006–2007: Oxford University

Career statistics
Competition	First-class
Matches	2
Runs scored	52
Batting average	17.33
100s/50s	–/–
Top score	46
Catches/stumpings	1/–
- Source: Cricinfo, 3 March 2020

Peter Raymond Dunbar (born 18 September 1984) is an English former first-class cricketer.

Dunbar was born at Harrow in September 1984. He was educated at Harrow School, before going up to Balliol College, Oxford. While studying at Oxford, he played first-class cricket for Oxford University, making two appearances against Cambridge University in The University Matches of 2006 and 2007. He scored 52 runs in his two matches, with a high score of 46.
