= Adam Putnam =

American politician (born 1974)

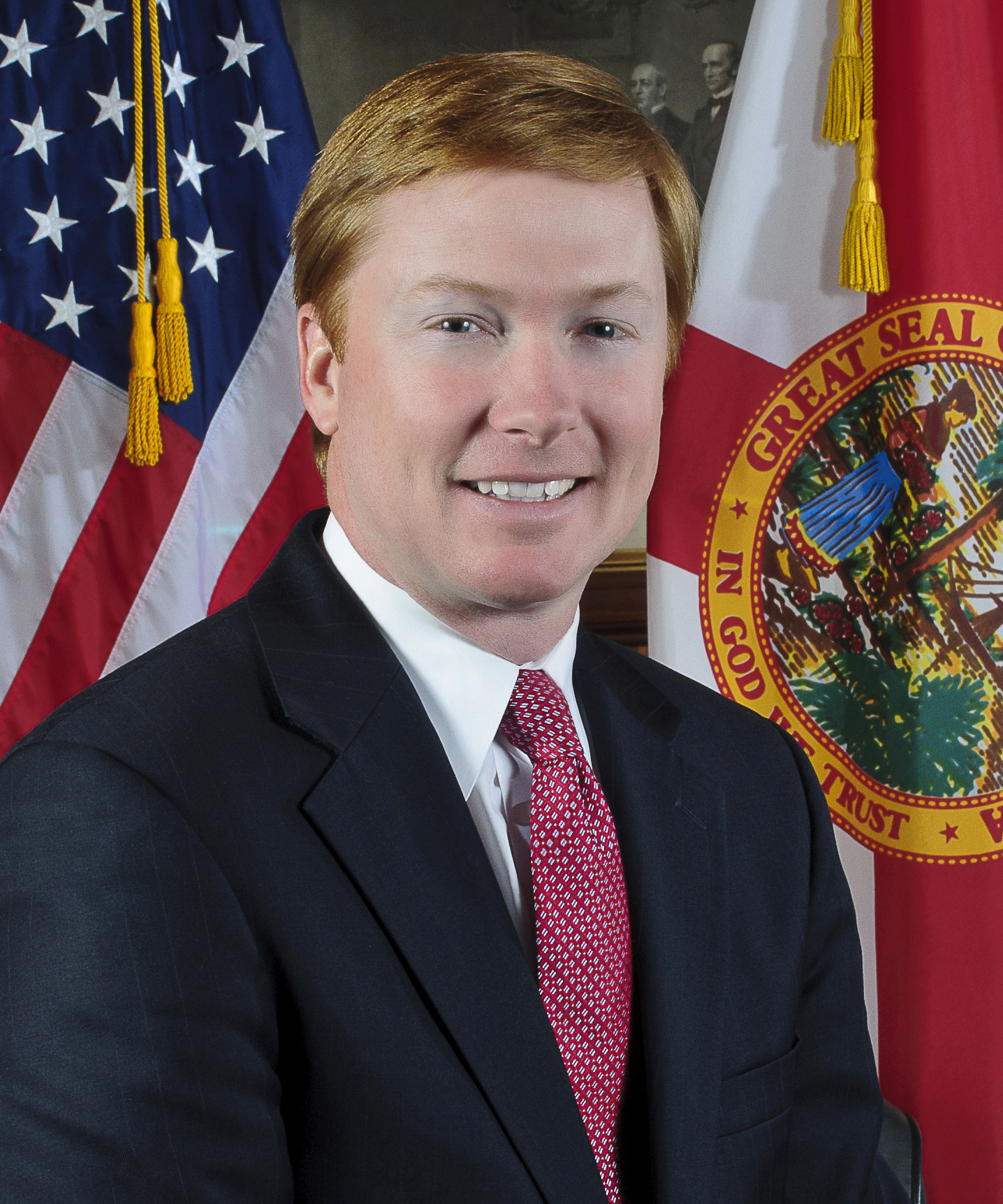
- Official portrait, 2011

11th Agriculture Commissioner of Florida
- In office January 4, 2011 – January 8, 2019
- Governor: Rick Scott
- Preceded by: Charles Bronson
- Succeeded by: Nikki Fried

Chair of the House Republican Conference
- In office January 3, 2007 – January 3, 2009
- Leader: John Boehner
- Vice Chair: Kay Granger
- Preceded by: Deborah Pryce
- Succeeded by: Mike Pence

Chair of the House Republican Policy Committee
- In office February 1, 2006 – January 3, 2007
- Leader: Dennis Hastert
- Preceded by: John Shadegg
- Succeeded by: Thad McCotter

Member of the U.S. House of Representatives from Florida's 12th district
- In office January 3, 2001 – January 3, 2011
- Preceded by: Charles Canady
- Succeeded by: Dennis Ross

Member of the Florida House of Representatives from the 63rd district
- In office November 5, 1996 – November 7, 2000
- Preceded by: Dean Saunders
- Succeeded by: Dennis Ross

Personal details
- Born: Adam Hughes Putnam; July 31, 1974 (age 51) Bartow, Florida, U.S.
- Party: Republican
- Spouse: Melissa Putnam
- Children: 4
- Education: University of Florida (BS)
- Website: Official website

Adam Hughes Putnam (born July 31, 1974) is an American politician and conservationist who served as the 11th Florida commissioner of agriculture from 2011 to 2019. A member of the Republican Party, he previously served in the U.S. House of Representatives for five terms, representing the Central Florida-based 12th congressional district from 2001 to 2011.

Born and raised in Bartow, Florida to a Florida cracker family, Putnam graduated from the University of Florida in 1996. That same year, he was elected to the Florida House of Representatives at the age of 22, the youngest person ever elected to the Florida Legislature. Following Charles Canady's retirement in 2000, Putnam was elected to the United States Congress at the age of 26, serving as Baby of the House from 2001 to 2005. He later chaired the House Republican Policy Committee from 2006 to 2007 and the House Republican Conference from 2007 to 2009. In 2010, Putnam was elected to the Florida Cabinet as state agriculture commissioner and was re-elected in 2014.

In May 2017, Putnam announced his candidacy for Governor of Florida in the 2018 election. He was initially considered the frontrunner for the Republican nomination, but lost the primary to then-Congressman Ron DeSantis. DeSantis went on to win the general election against Tallahassee mayor and Democratic nominee Andrew Gillum.

Since 2019, Putnam has been the CEO of Ducks Unlimited.

== Early life, education, and early career ==
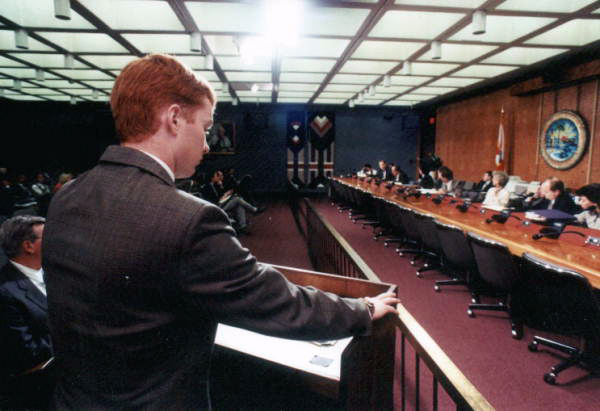
Putnam addressing a Florida House of Representatives committee in 1998

Putnam was born in Bartow, Florida, the son of Sarah Elizabeth (née Hughes) and William Dudley Putnam II. He graduated from Bartow High School and attended the University of Florida, graduating with a Bachelor of Science in food and resource economics. He is an Episcopalian.

In 1996, Putnam was elected to the Florida House of Representatives, representing parts of Polk County. At 22 years old, he was the youngest person ever elected to the Florida Legislature. He was reelected to a second term in 1998. While in the state house, he served as chair of the Agriculture Committee.

== U.S. House of Representatives ==
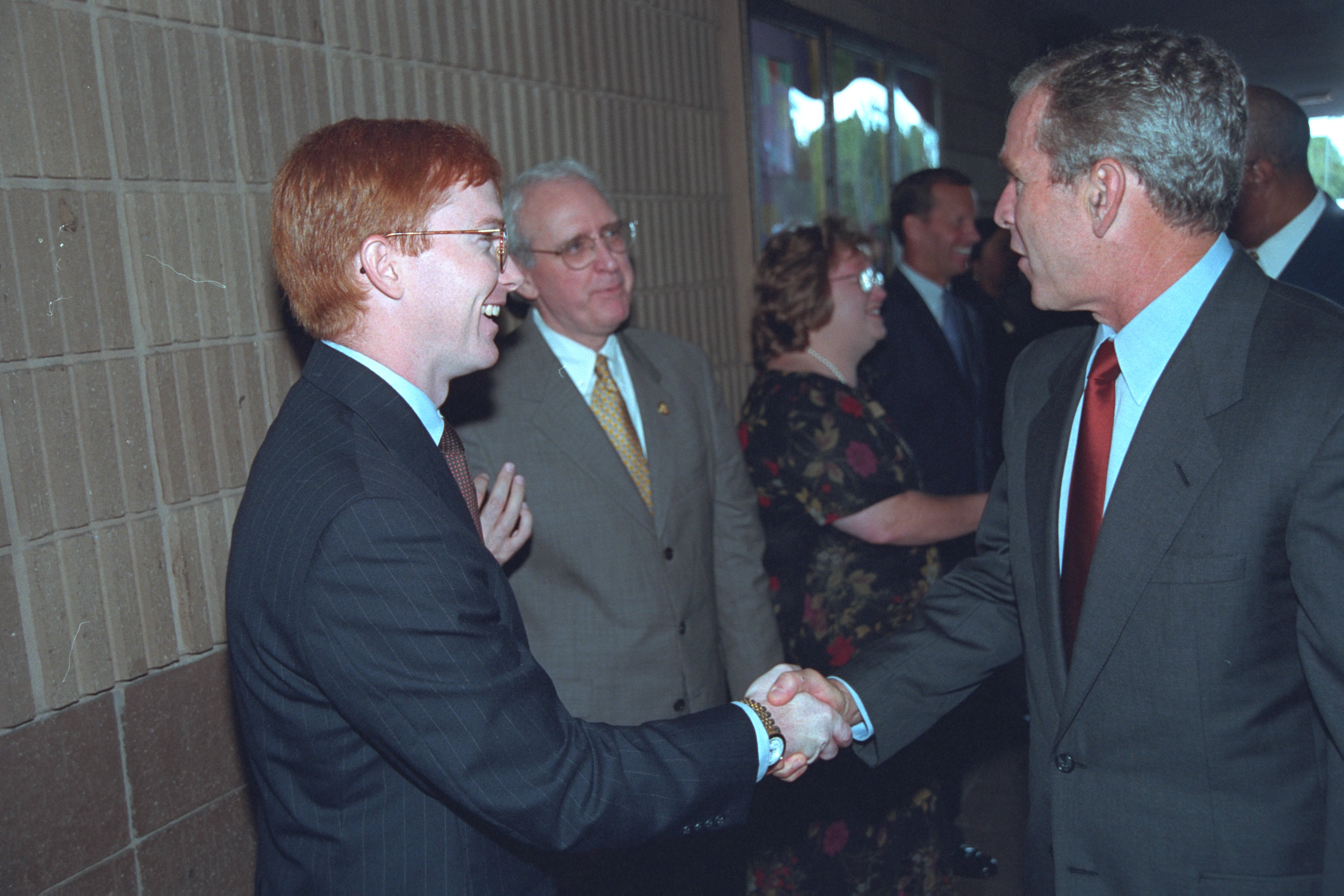
Putnam greeting President George W. Bush at Emma E. Booker Elementary School in Sarasota, Florida, the day of the September 11 attacks

In 2000, Putnam ran for the U.S. House seat being vacated by retiring Congressman Charles Canady. The district, numbered the 12th, included all of Putnam's home constituency as well as other areas of Polk County and rural Central Florida. He faced no opposition in the Republican primary, and defeated Democrat Mike Stedem in the general election, 57 to 43%. Taking office when he was 26 years old, Putnam was the youngest member of Congress from 2001 to 2005. Putnam was reelected in 2002 to a redistricted seat that included most of Polk County as well as parts of neighboring Hillsborough and Osceola Counties. He was reelected three more times after that, serving a total of ten years in Congress.

=== Committee assignments ===
- Committee on Financial Services
  - Subcommittee on Capital Markets, Insurance, and Government Sponsored Enterprises
  - Subcommittee on Housing and Community Opportunity

=== Tenure ===
On October 10, 2002, Putnam voted in favor of authorizing the invasion of Iraq.

In February 2006, Putnam became a member of the House leadership, assuming the role of chairman of the House Republican Policy Committee, the fifth-ranking Republican leadership position in the House. In November 2006, Putnam was elected by his colleagues as House Republican Conference Chairman, the third-highest ranking position. Following House Republican losses in the 2008 general election, he resigned his post as Conference Chairman. In 2010 The Florida Independent reported that Putnam had earmarked $100,000 for an abscission chemical used in citrus harvesting that The Florida Independent said would benefit his family's citrus business.

Putnam was a signatory to the Taxpayer Protection Pledge. The American Conservative Union gave him a 91% evaluation.

=== Gonzales' ouster ===
After the numerous calls by Democrats, including Rep. Nancy Pelosi (D-CA), Speaker of the House and Senate Majority Leader Sen. Harry Reid (D-NV), Putnam became the top Republican in either house to call for the ouster of then U.S. Attorney General Alberto Gonzales. "For the good of the nation, I think it is time for fresh leadership at the Department of Justice", Putnam said. This was met with surprise by many Republicans, who were remaining silent on the Gonzales issue. However, Putnam mentioned that there remained severe discontent within the GOP circle over Gonzales and as the Chairman of the House Republican Conference, he thought that it was important to send this message out.

== Florida Commissioner of Agriculture and Consumer Services ==
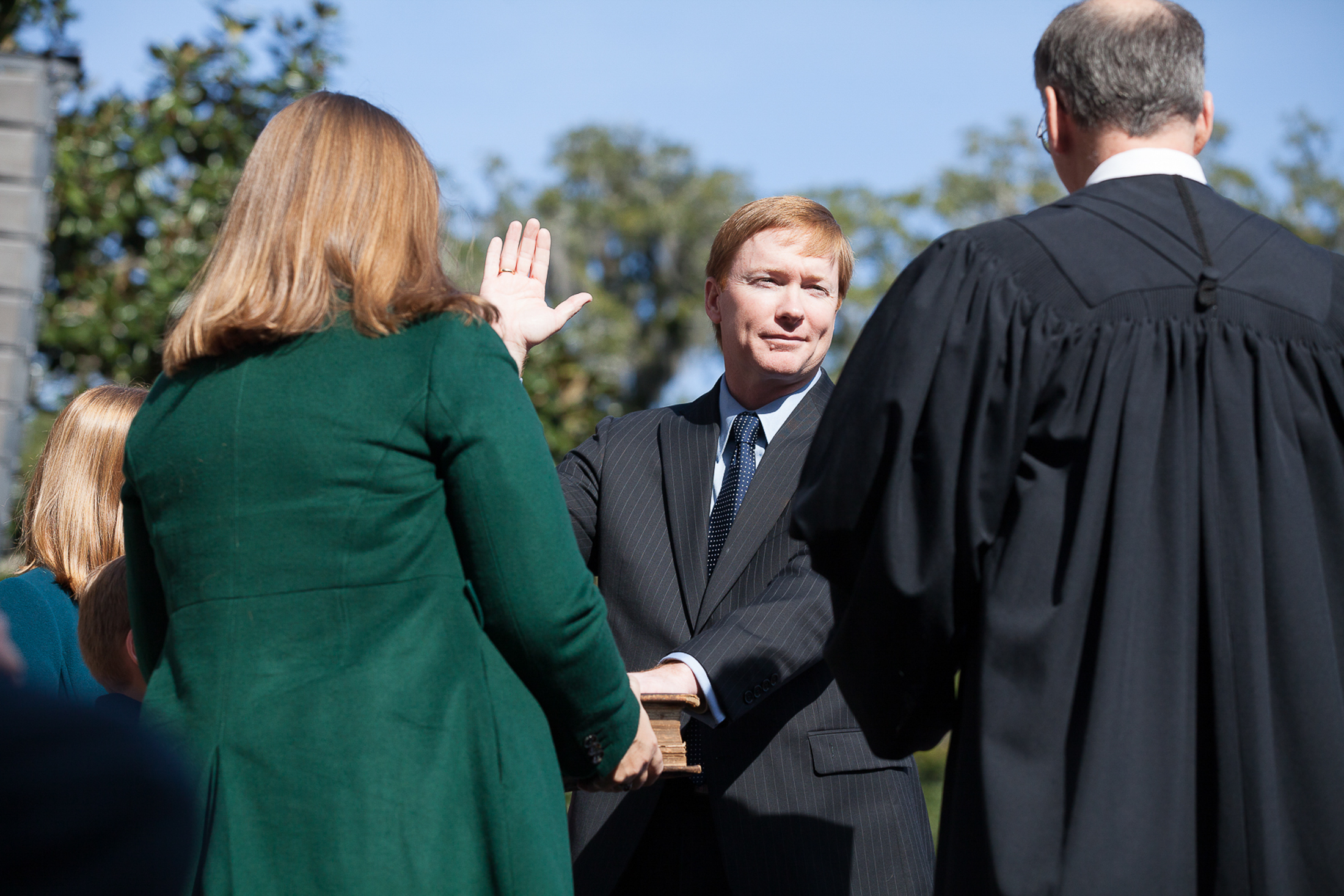
Putnam being sworn in for a second term as Florida Commissioner of Agriculture in 2015

In February 2009, Putnam declared himself a candidate for Florida Commissioner of Agriculture and Consumer Services in the 2010 election and that he would not seek a sixth term in Congress. Putnam won the election over Democratic opponent Scott Maddox with 56% of the vote. He was reelected in 2014.

As head of the Florida Department of Agriculture and Consumer Services, Putnam was responsible for issuing concealed weapons permits after conducting background checks on applicants. An investigation by the Office of Inspector General found that from February 2016 until May 2017 the department stopped conducting national background checks on applicants for concealed weapons permits, because a worker could not log into an FBI database. More than 100,000 concealed carry permits were issued during this period without full screening. Putnam later said that 365 applicants should have been further backgrounded, and that 291 permits ended up being revoked for noncriminal disqualifying factors (drug abuse, mental illness, fugitives). Putnam pointed out that concealed carry permits do not allow gun purchases, which require a background check at the time of purchase. Florida Governor Rick Scott said that the incident was "disturbing" and "concerning" adding, "People need to do their jobs. This is public safety." Additional failures in conducting proper reviews of gun permit applications were reported in a 2012 report of the inspector general, including the issuance of gun licenses to felons, which occurred during the first years of Putnam's tenure, although certain instances occurred before Putnam's tenure.

In response to the 2013 series Worst Charities in America by the Tampa Bay Times and the Center for Investigative Reporting (CIR)—the result of a year-long joint investigation, in 2014 Putnam crafted CS/SB 638 and CS/HB 629—legislation that was intended to crack down on "fraudulent and deceptive organizations" to prevent them from misusing charitable contributions donated by residents of Florida. The legislation "had passed two of their three referenced committees" by March 2014.

== 2018 Florida gubernatorial campaign ==
In May 2017, Putnam announced his campaign for the governorship of Florida in the 2018 election to succeed term-limited Republican Rick Scott. He was one of eight candidates running for the Republican nomination.

Putnam placed second in the primary election, which was won by U.S. Representative Ron DeSantis. However, as of April 2018, Putnam's campaign had acquired $19.2 million in campaign contributions, far more than any other candidate. His PAC, Florida Grown, received large contributions from The Walt Disney Company ($824,442), Publix ($736,000), Florida Power and Light ($587,060) and U.S. Sugar ($560,000). The donations from Publix to Putnam drew public protest, including a die-in at a Publix supermarket, resulting from Putnam's claim of being a "proud NRA sell-out".

== Ducks Unlimited ==
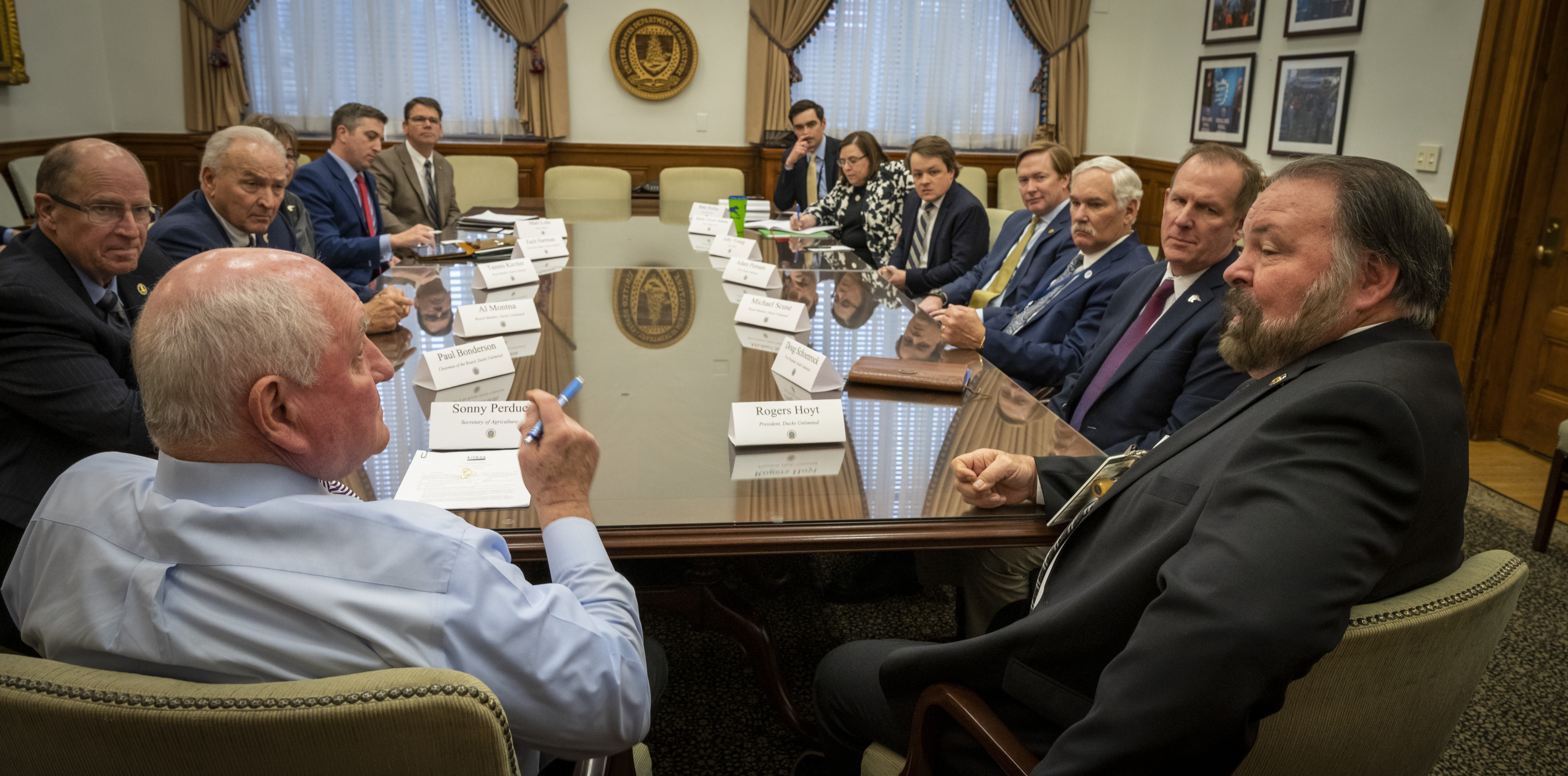
Putnam at USDA headquarters with Secretary Sonny Perdue, 2020

In 2019, Putnam was named as chief executive officer (CEO) of Ducks Unlimited.

== Electoral history ==
=== Florida House of Representatives ===
Florida's 63rd House district: Results 1996–1998
Year	Democrat	Votes	Pct	Republican	Votes	Pct
1996	Bob Stein	17,703	42.74%	Adam Putnam	23,717	57.26%
1998	Kim Grady	12,736	38.24%	Adam Putnam (inc.)	20,568	61.76%

=== United States House of Representatives ===
Florida's 12th congressional district: Results 2000–2008
Year	Democrat	Votes	Pct	Republican	Votes	Pct	3rd Party	Party	Votes	Pct
2000	Mike Stedem	94,395	42.98%	Adam Putnam	125,224	57.02%	(write-ins)		6	0.00%
2002	(no candidate)			Adam Putnam (inc.)	Unopposed	100%				
2004	Bob Hagenmaier	96,965	35.11%	Adam Putnam (inc.)	179,204	64.89%				
2006	(no candidate)			Adam Putnam (inc.)	124,452	69.12%	Joe Viscusi; Ed Bowlin	Independent; Independent	34,976; 20,636	19.42% 11.46%
2008	Doug Tudor	137,465	42.54%	Adam Putnam (inc.)	185,698	57.46%				

=== Commissioner of Agriculture ===
2010 Florida Commissioner of Agriculture election
Party	Candidate	Votes	%	±%
Republican	Adam Putnam	2,908,086	55.94%	−1.04%
Democratic	Scott Maddox	1,983,277	38.15%	−4.87%
Tea Party of Florida	Ira Chester	203,598	3.92%	—
Independent	Thad Hamilton	103,717	2.00%	—
Majority		924,809	17.79%	+3.84%
Turnout		5,198,678		
Republican hold				

2014 Florida Commissioner of Agriculture election
Party	Candidate	Votes	%	±%
Republican	Adam Putnam (inc.)	3,342,392	58.65%	+2.71%
Democratic	Thad Hamilton	2,356,178	41.35%	+3.20%
Write-in		203	0.00%	—
Majority		986,214	17.31%	−0.48%
Turnout		5,698,783		
Republican hold				

=== Governor ===
Results by county: Map legend: DeSantis—70–80%; DeSantis—60–70%; DeSantis—50–60%; DeSantis—40–50%; Putnam—40–50%; Putnam—50–60%; Putnam—60–70%; Putnam—70–80%

2018 Republican primary results
Party	Candidate	Votes	%
Republican	Ron DeSantis	916,298	56.49%
Republican	Adam Putnam	592,518	36.53%
Republican	Bob White	32,710	2.02%
Republican	Timothy M. Devine	21,380	1.32%
Republican	Bob Langford	19,842	1.22%
Republican	Bruce Nathan	14,556	0.90%
Republican	Don Baldauf	13,173	0.81%
Republican	John Joseph Mercadante	11,647	0.72%
Total votes		1,622,124	100.00%

U.S. House of Representatives
Preceded by Charles Canady	Member of the U.S. House of Representatives from Florida's 12th congressional district 2001–2011	Succeeded by Dennis Ross
Honorary titles
Preceded by Harold Ford	Baby of the House; 2001–2005	Succeeded by Patrick McHenry
Party political offices
Preceded by John Shadegg	Chair of the House Republican Policy Committee; 2006–2007	Succeeded by Thad McCotter
Preceded by Deborah Pryce	Chair of the House Republican Conference; 2007–2009	Succeeded by Mike Pence
Preceded by Charles Bronson	Republican nominee for Agriculture Commissioner of Florida; 2010, 2014	Succeeded by Matt Caldwell
Political offices
Preceded by Charles Bronson	Agriculture Commissioner of Florida; 2011–2019	Succeeded by Nikki Fried
U.S. order of precedence (ceremonial)
Preceded by Jim Davis as Former U.S. Representative	Order of precedence of the United States as Former U.S. Representative	Succeeded by Tom Rooney as Former U.S. Representative
