= Peter Dunbar (politician) =

American politician (born 1947)

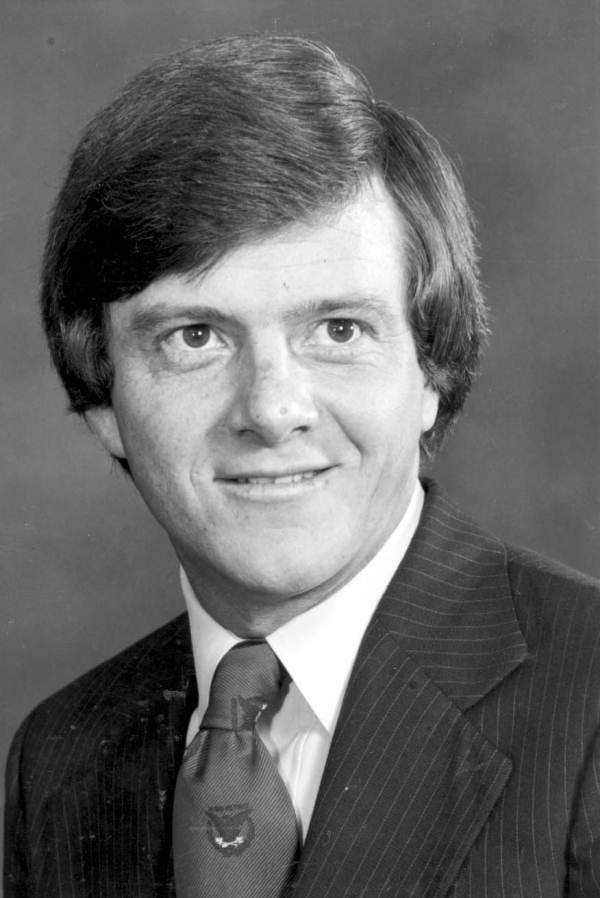
- Dunbar in 1978

Member of the Florida House of Representatives from the 53rd district
- In office 1978–1982
- Preceded by: Mary Grizzle
- Succeeded by: Dennis Jones

Member of the Florida House of Representatives from the 50th district
- In office 1982–1988
- Preceded by: Beverly Burnsed Spencer
- Succeeded by: Sandy Safley

Personal details
- Born: January 10, 1947 (age 79) New Haven, Connecticut, U.S.
- Party: Republican
- Education: Florida State University

Peter M. Dunbar (born January 10, 1947) is an American politician. He served as a Republican member for the 50th and 53rd district of the Florida House of Representatives.

== Life and career ==
Dunbar was born in New Haven, Connecticut. He attended Florida State University.

In 1978, Dunbar was elected to represent the 53rd district of the Florida House of Representatives, succeeding Mary Grizzle. He served until 1982, when he was succeeded by Dennis Jones. In the same year, he was elected to represent the 50th district, succeeding Beverly Burnsed Spencer. He served until 1988, when he was succeeded by Sandy Safley.
