= Carl Zimmermann (politician) =

American politician

Carl F. Zimmermann
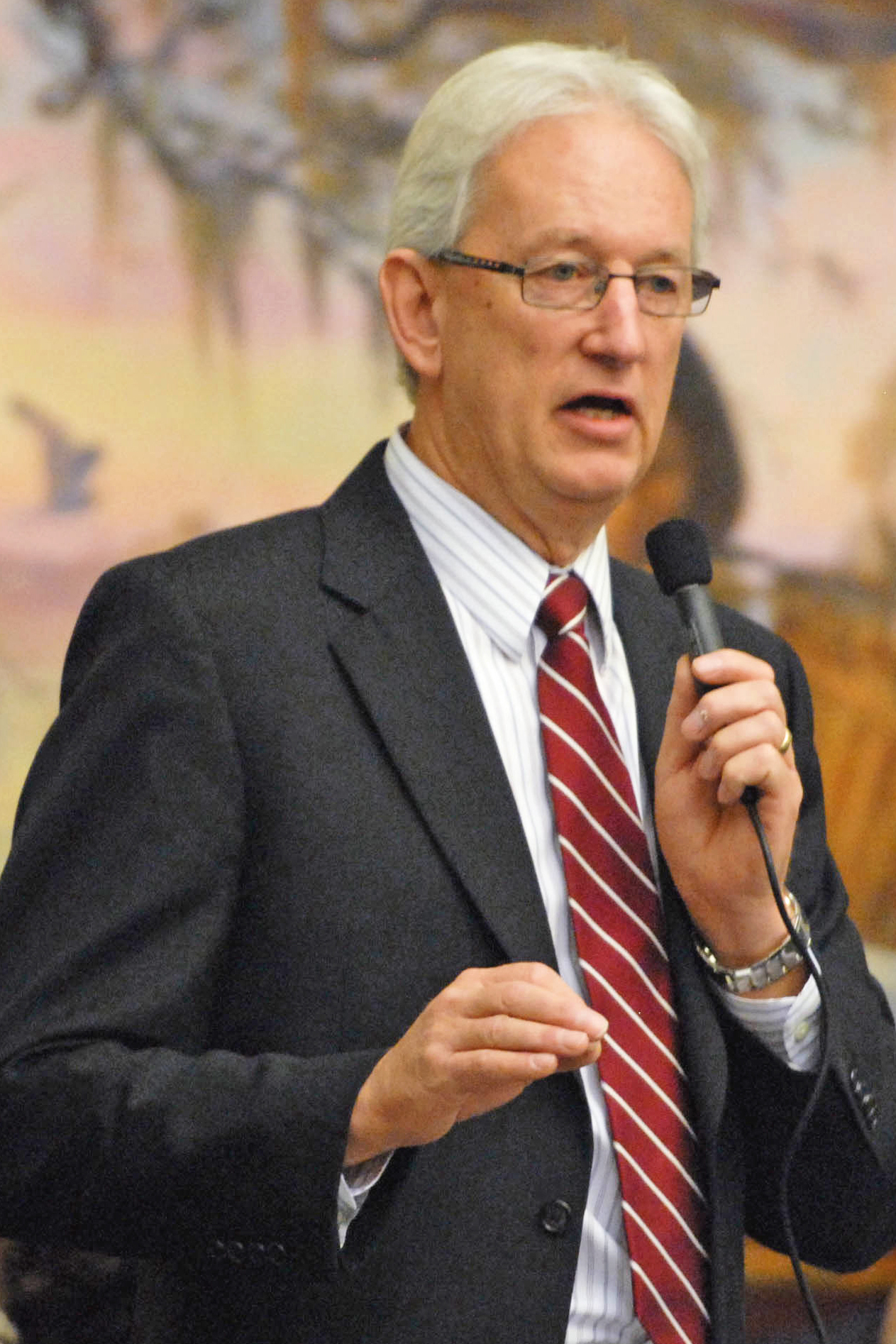

Member of the Florida House of Representatives from the 65th district
- In office November 6, 2012 – November 4, 2014
- Preceded by: Peter Nehr
- Succeeded by: Chris Sprowls

Personal details
- Born: February 24, 1951 (age 75) Bayshore, New York
- Party: Democratic
- Education: Buffalo State College (B.S.) (M.S.)
- Profession: Teacher and broadcast journalist

Carl Zimmermann (born February 24, 1951) is an American Democratic politician and a former member of the Florida House of Representatives, representing the 65th district for a single term, 2012–2014.

== Education and early career ==
Zimmermann attended SUNY Buffalo in Buffalo, New York, where he graduated with a bachelor's degree and a master's degree in education. He worked for several advertising agencies for nine years before moving to Florida in 1984. Zimmermann taught TV production at Countryside High School in Clearwater. He is known for building a nationally recognized, award-winning TV/Broadcast journalism program that he oversaw for over 30 years before retiring in January, 2018. Zimmermann was recognized six times as teacher of the year—three times as the Tampa Bay-area teacher of the year, and, in 2003 was chosen Florida journalism teacher of the year by the Florida Scholastic Press Association. The program at Countryside High School is known as UPC-TV, short for Upper Pinellas County TV, and has produced as many as 100 graduates that went on to successful careers in the television or film industry. For 15 years he took students to the Sundance Film Festival for a week and for 8 years prior to that the annual field trip was to the National Association of Broadcasters convention in Las Vegas. Zimmermann is also an accomplished screenplay writer having won "best comedy" in a contest in L.A. for his feature screenplay, "Your Horoscope for Today", runner up in the same contest the following year for "best drama" for his serial killer mystery, "The Toe Tag Murders" which was also chosen for a live, open read at the 2018 Crime and Mystery Film Festival in Toronto. His other screenplays include, "The Reporter" and "Goose Hill Road."

== Florida House of Representatives ==
When incumbent Republican State Representative Gus Bilirakis vacated his House seat due to term limits and ran for Congress, Zimmermann ran to succeed him in the 48th District, which included a few precincts in Pasco County and northern Pinellas County. He won the nomination of the Democratic Party unopposed and faced Tarpon Springs City Commissioner Peter Nehr, the Republican nominee, in the general election. Zimmermann narrowly lost to Nehr by 1,485 votes, winning 48% of the vote. He ran against Nehr again in 2008, and again lost, winning 49% of the vote.

When the Florida House of Representatives districts were redrawn in 2012, Zimmermann opted to run in the 65th District, which closely matched the 48th District in the territory it encompassed. For the third time, he faced Nehr in a general election. The Tampa Bay Times endorsed Zimmermann, praising him for having "passion for public education and a better sense of what works in the classroom, including favoring end-of-course exams instead of the FCAT".

In the legislature, Zimmermann tentatively supported legislation that would allow trained employees to carry guns in the school they were assigned to, as he was "swayed by the argument that rural schools cannot afford to wait the extra minutes it might take for law enforcement to arrive in the case of a mass shooting".

He lost his seat in the 2014 General Election to Republican challenger Chris Sprowls by a vote of 34,417 to 31,264.

Florida House of Representatives
Preceded by Peter Nehr	Member of the Florida House of Representatives from the 65th district 2012–2014	Succeeded by Chris Sprowls
