= Florida's 65th House of Representatives district =

Florida district

Florida's 65th State House of Representatives district
Representative
Karen Gonzalez Pittman; R–Tampa

Florida's 65th House of Representatives district elects one member of the Florida House of Representatives. It covers parts of Hillsborough County.

== Members ==
- Carl Zimmermann (2012–2014)
- Chris Sprowls (2014–2022)
- Karen Gonzalez Pittman (since 2022)
