= Gus Bilirakis =

American politician & lawyer (born 1963)

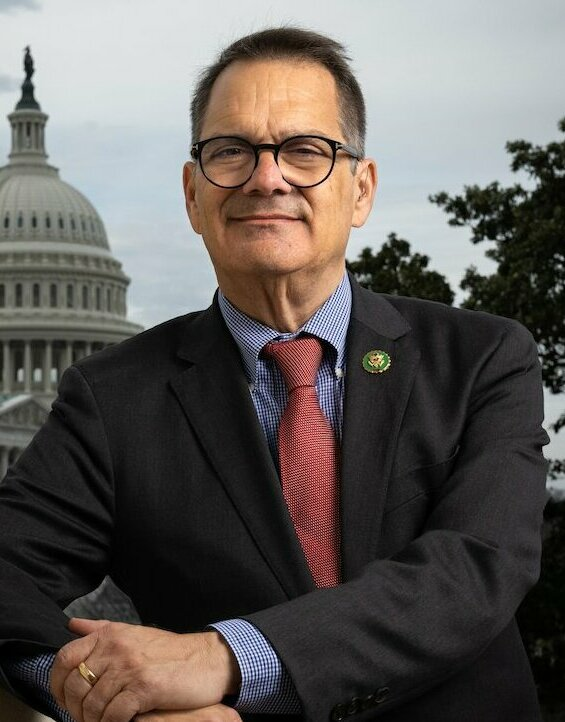
- Official portrait, 2023

Member of the U.S. House of Representatives from Florida
- Incumbent
- Assumed office January 3, 2007
- Preceded by: Michael Bilirakis
- Constituency: 9th district (2007–2013); 12th district (2013–present)

Member of the Florida House of Representatives from the 48th district
- In office November 3, 1998 – November 7, 2006
- Preceded by: Sandy Safley
- Succeeded by: Peter Nehr

Personal details
- Born: Gus Michael Bilirakis; February 8, 1963 (age 63) Gainesville, Florida, U.S.
- Party: Republican
- Spouse: Eva Lialios (m. 1991)
- Children: 4
- Relatives: Michael Bilirakis (father)
- Education: St. Petersburg College (attended); University of Florida (BA); Stetson University (JD)
- Website: House website Campaign website
- Bilirakis's voice Bilirakis on Greece's role in aiding Syrian refugees. Recorded September 30, 2016

Gus Michael Bilirakis (/ˌbɪlɪˈrækɪs/ BIL-ih-RAK-iss; born February 8, 1963) is an American lawyer and politician serving as the U.S. representative for Florida's 12th congressional district since 2013. A member of the Republican Party, he first entered Congress in 2007, where he succeeded his father Michael Bilirakis, representing Florida's 9th congressional district until redistricting. His district includes much of the northern portion of the Tampa Bay area. Bilirakis previously served as the Florida state representative for the 48th district from 1998 to 2006.

== Early life and education ==
Bilirakis was born in Gainesville, Florida, and grew up in Tarpon Springs, Florida, the son of Evelyn (née Miaoulis) and Michael Bilirakis. He lives in Palm Harbor and is the grandson of Greek immigrants. His grandfather owned a local bakery where Bilirakis worked from a young age.

Bilirakis graduated from Tarpon Springs High School and St. Petersburg Junior College. He then attended the University of Florida, where he graduated in 1986 with a bachelor's degree in political science. He received his J.D. degree from the Stetson University College of Law in 1989. He was an intern for U.S. President Ronald Reagan.

== Career ==
Bilirakis operated a law practice, the Bilirakis Law Group, specializing in probate and estate planning, which he took over from his father, Michael Bilirakis. His father served in Congress from 1983 to 2007, and Gus helped run his campaigns.

=== Florida legislature ===
==== Tenure ====
Bilirakis was first elected to the Florida House of Representatives in 1998 when he won the District 48 seat held for 10 years by Representative Sandy Safley, R-Clearwater, who decided not to run again. This district covers most of north Pinellas County, part of Pasco County, and part of Hillsborough County.

==== Committees ====
During his tenure in Tallahassee (1998–2006), he chaired several panels including Crime Prevention, Public Safety Appropriations, and the Economic Development, Trade, & Banking Committee.

== U.S. House of Representatives ==
=== Elections ===
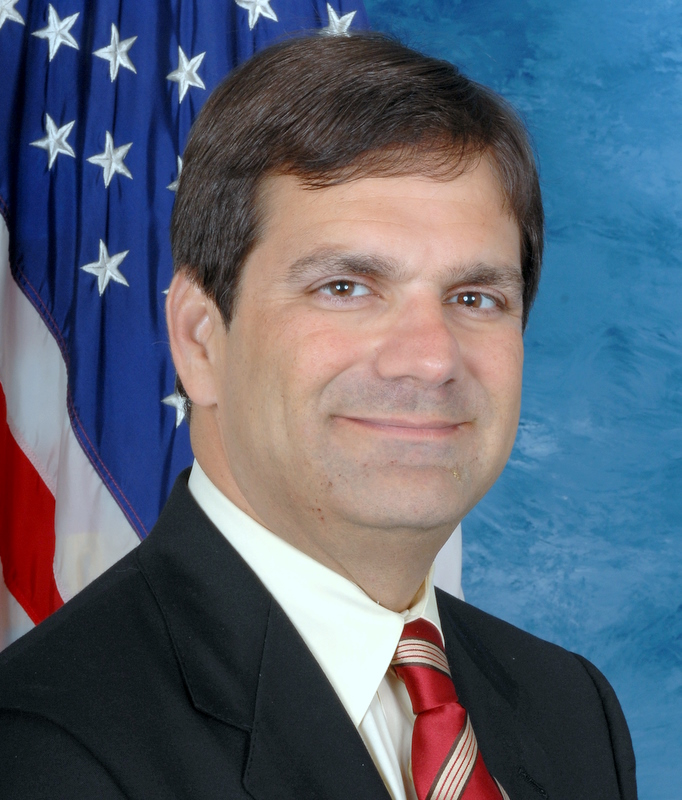
Bilirakis in 2007, during his freshman Congressional term

In 2006, Michael Bilirakis announced his retirement after 24 years in Congress, and Gus Bilirakis entered the race to succeed his father in what was then the 9th District. He defeated Hillsborough County Commissioner Phyllis Busansky in the general election with 55% of the vote to become the district's second representative. He has been reelected three more times without substantive opposition.

=== Committee assignments ===
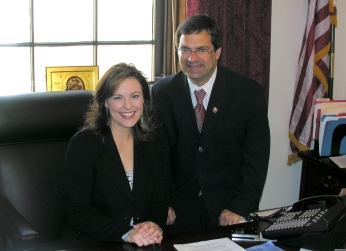
Gus Bilirakis meets with Diabetes advocate and former Miss America Nicole Johnson

For the 118th Congress:

- Committee on Energy and Commerce
  - Subcommittee on Communications and Technology
  - Subcommittee on Health
  - Subcommittee on Innovation, Data, and Commerce (Chairman)

=== Caucus membership ===
Bilirakis and Representative Ted Deutch formed the Congressional Hellenic-Israeli Alliance in February 2013.

- Republican Study Committee
- Co-chair of Congressional Diabetes Caucus
- Congressional Coalition on Adoption
- Rare Disease Caucus
- Congressional Ukraine Caucus
- Congressional Taiwan Caucus
- BIOTech Caucus

=== Tenure ===
Bilirakis is a member of the Republican Party's Whip Team and is Chair of the Veterans’ Affairs Task Force for the Republican Policy Committee. Additionally, Bilirakis serves as a co-chair of the Congressional Military Veterans Caucus and the Congressional Caucus on Hellenic Issues.

He is a signer of the Taxpayer Protection Pledge and a pledge sponsored by Americans for Prosperity promising to vote against any climate change legislation that would raise taxes.

On September 29, 2008, Bilirakis voted against the Emergency Economic Stabilization Act of 2008.

In 2022, Bilirakis voted against naming a federal building in Florida after Joseph W. Hatchett, the first Black State Supreme Court judge in Florida and south of the Mason-Dixon line.

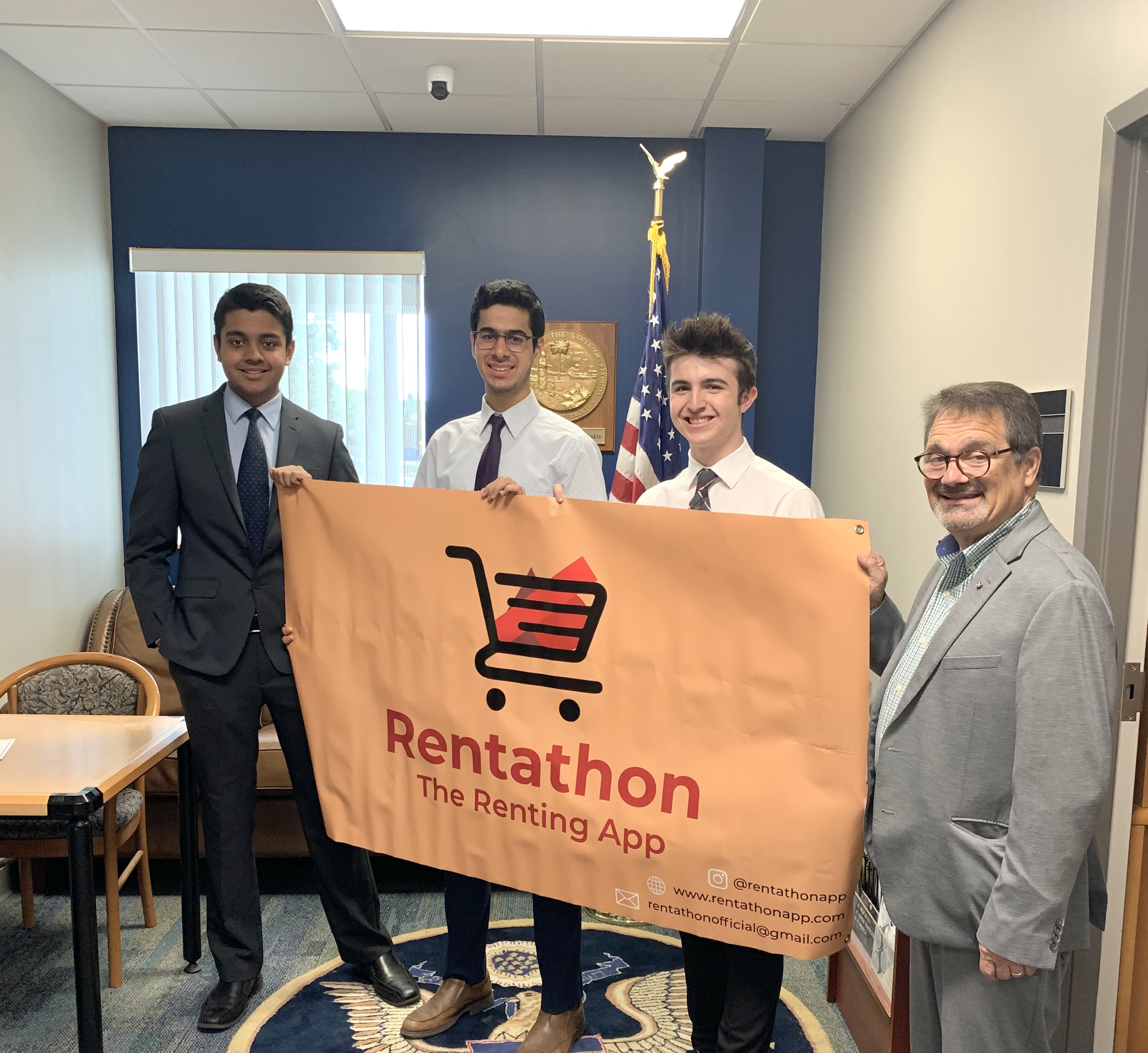
Palm Harbor University High School students with Gus Bilirakis after winning the 2020 Congressional App Challenge.

== Political positions ==
=== Healthcare ===
Bilirakis supports repealing the Affordable Care Act, also known as Obamacare.

On February 11, 2017, Bilirakis hosted a townhall in Pasco County, Florida, where he was faced with several protesters angry over the potential repeal of the Affordable Care Act, when a member of the local party (an unauthorized speaker for the county REC), Bill Akins repeated the now debunked claim that the ACA contains "what is effectively known as death panels". Bilirakis nodded in agreement and later told CNN, "The board exists, OK? And I've voted to repeal the board." Bilirakis seemed to equate the "death panel" with the Independent Advisory Board, a 15-member committee that issues recommendations for reducing healthcare costs, subject to congressional oversight and approval.

In early October 2018, Bilirakis released a campaign advertisement touting his work fighting opioids in Pasco County, Florida. In the advertisement, he took credit for a law he did not have a hand in crafting. The 30-second ad flashed text about a "Bilirakis INTERDICT ACT" as Pasco County Sheriff Chris Nocco said Bilirakis is "giving us the tools to do our job and get traffickers off the street". The INTERDICT Act provides funding and equipment to U.S. Customs and Border Protection for detecting imported fentanyl. But Bilirakis was neither a sponsor nor one of 18 co-sponsors, making it unclear how it is the "Bilirakis INTERDICT Act".

=== Tax policy ===
Bilirakis voted in favor of the Tax Cuts and Jobs Act of 2017.

=== Gun policy ===
From 2015 to 2016, Bilirakis accepted $2,000 in direct campaign contributions from the NRA's Political Victory Fund; As of 2017, he has an "A" rating from the NRA, indicating a voting record that is generally pro-gun rights.

As a U.S. Representative, Bilirakis has voted on several pieces of legislation pertaining to firearms. He supported H. R. 38, which would enable concealed carry reciprocity among all states if and when it is signed into law.

In March 2017, Bilirakis voted for the Veterans Second Amendment Protection Act, which, if signed into law, would prohibit, in any case arising out of the administration of laws and benefits by the Department of Veterans Affairs, any person who is mentally incapacitated, deemed mentally incompetent, or experiencing an extended loss of consciousness, of the right to receive or transport firearms, without the order or finding of a judicial authority of competent jurisdiction.

After the 2017 Las Vegas shooting, Bilirakis signed a letter written to the Bureau of Alcohol, Tobacco, Firearms and Explosives, urging it to reevaluate the legal status of bump stocks. No action had been taken as of March 2018.

In the wake of the Stoneman Douglas High School shooting in 2018, Bilirakis said that he would be willing to consider gun control legislation, "if that's what it takes". He said that, specifically, he would support more school resource officers in schools. He also announced his support for legislation that would ensure "that those who are mentally ill do not have access to weapons".

=== Nagorno-Karabakh war ===
On October 1, 2020, Bilirakis co-signed a letter to Secretary of State Mike Pompeo that condemned Azerbaijan's offensive operations against the Armenian-populated enclave of Nagorno-Karabakh, denounced Turkey's role in the Nagorno-Karabakh war, and called for an immediate ceasefire.

=== Israel-Palestine ===
Bilirakis voted to provide Israel with support following October 7 attacks.

== Personal life ==
Bilirakis has four children and is an Eastern Orthodox Christian.

In 2014, Bilirakis had a cameo as a job applicant in the feature film Walt Before Mickey starring Thomas Ian Nicholas, Jon Heder, and Armando Gutierrez.

== Foreign honors ==
- Greece
  - Grand Commander of the Order of the Phoenix

U.S. House of Representatives
Preceded by Michael Bilirakis	Member of the U.S. House of Representatives from Florida's 9th congressional district 2007–2013	Succeeded by Alan Grayson
Preceded by Dennis Ross	Member of the U.S. House of Representatives from Florida's 12th congressional district 2013–present	Incumbent
U.S. order of precedence (ceremonial)
Preceded by Doris Matsui	United States representatives by seniority 53rd	Succeeded by Vern Buchanan
Preceded by Steve Cohen	Order of precedence of the United States	Succeeded by Vern Buchanan
