= 2010 Florida Commissioner of Agriculture election =

- November 2, 2010
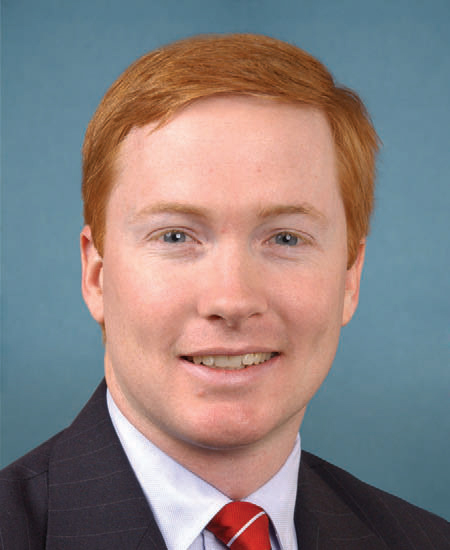

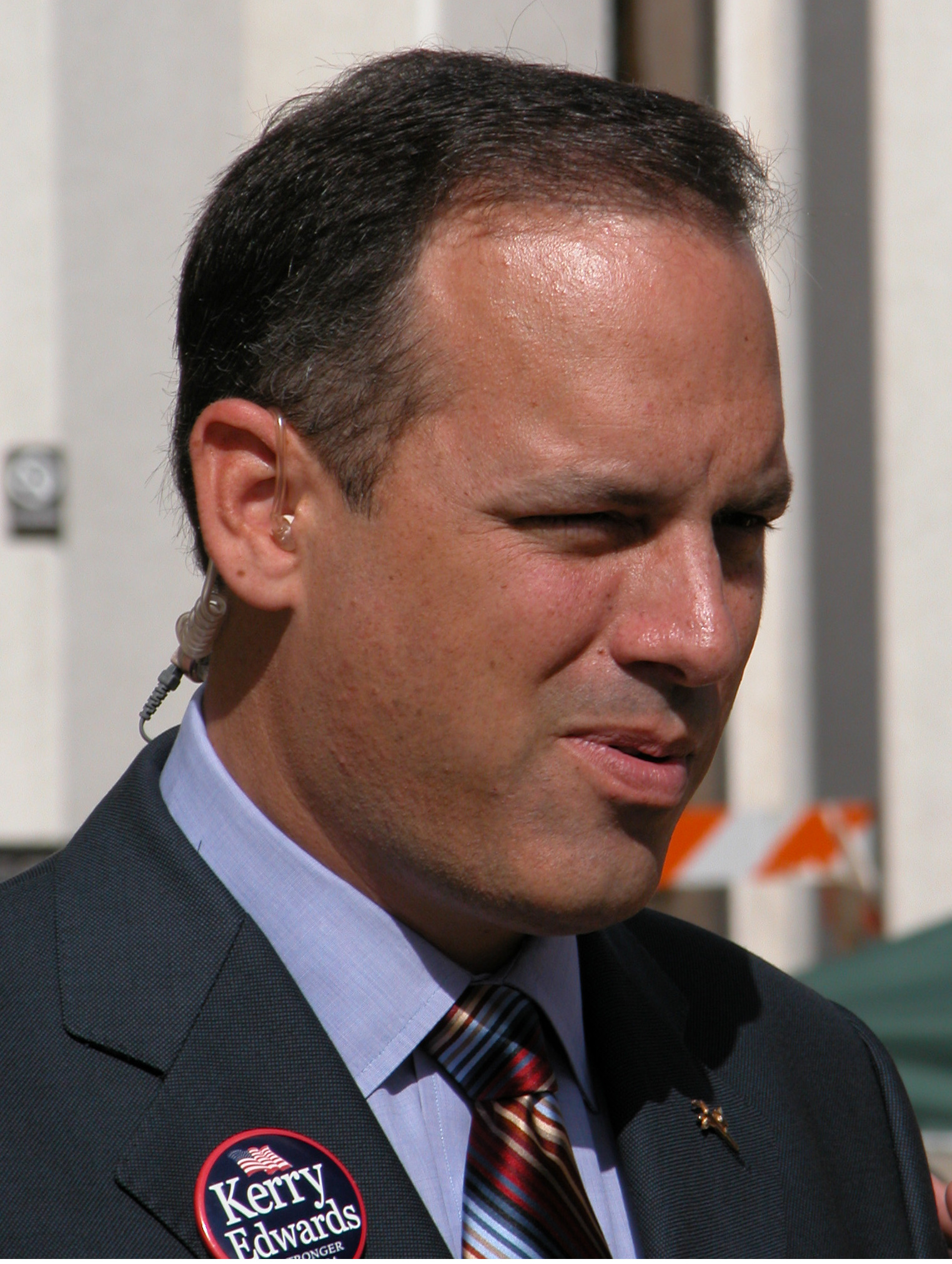
Nominee	Adam Putnam	Scott Maddox
Party	Republican	Democratic
Popular vote	2,908,086	1,983,277
Percentage	55.94%	38.15%
- Putnam: 30–40% 40–50% 50–60% 60–70% 70–80% 80–90% >90% Maddox: 30–40% 40–50% 50–60% 60-70% 70–80% 80–90% >90% Tie: 30–40% 40–50% 50% No votes
Agriculture
Commissioner before election
Charles Bronson
Republican
Elected Agriculture
Commissioner
Adam Putnam
Republican

The 2010 Florida Commissioner of Agriculture election took place on November 2, 2010, to elect the Florida Commissioner of Agriculture. The election was won by Adam Putnam who took office on January 4, 2011.

== Republican primary ==
Republican primary results
Party	Candidate	Votes	%
Republican	Adam Putnam	Unopposed	100.0

== Democratic primary ==
Democratic primary results
Party	Candidate	Votes	%
Democratic	Scott Maddox	Unopposed	100.0

== General election ==
2010 Florida Commissioner of Agriculture election
Party	Candidate	Votes	%	±%
Republican	Adam Putnam	2,908,086	55.94%	−1.04%
Democratic	Scott Maddox	1,983,277	38.15%	−4.87%
Tea Party of Florida	Ira Chester	203,598	3.92%	—
Independent	Thad Hamilton	103,717	2.00%	—
Majority		924,809	17.79%	+3.84%
Turnout		5,198,678		
Republican hold				
