= Government of Brevard County, Florida =

Brevard County has a county government, municipal governments, and various Florida state and U.S. federal agencies.

== Summary ==
County commissioners are elected by the public to establish ordinances and policies for the county. The Commission appoints a County Manager, who executes the will of the Commission. The county employed about 2,350 workers in 2024.

The government under the jurisdiction of the county commission includes:Agricultural Extension Service, Central Services (contractual services for the government), Animal Services and Enforcement, Emergency Management, Facilities (support services for the government), Fire Rescue, Space Coast Government Television and Communications, Library Services, Utility Services, Information Technology, Human Resources, Mosquito Control, Housing and Human Services, Planning and Development, Natural Resources Management, Parks and Recreation, Public Works, Space Coast Area Transit, Solid Waste Management, and Tourism Development.

A centrally located County Government Center in Viera houses the various county government branches, including Housing and Human Services, Juvenile Justice, Public Safety, Public Works and Solid Waste Management. County and school board meetings are televised on Educational-access television, and the public is present for all city and town council meetings as per Florida's own version of Government in the Sunshine Act.

The various cities, towns and villages of Brevard have varying reliance on services provided by the Brevard County government.

The Brevard County government had annual expenditures just over $1 billion in the fiscal year 2009-2010, exclusive of the municipalities. In 2009, real estate taxes for homesteaded property averaged .83% of the value of the property. Real estate taxes are levied by each authority. They are collected by the County Tax Collector. The money is disbursed (for a typical Palm Bay resident) as follows: School Board 41%, City (Palm Bay for this case) 31%, County Commission 26%, Water Management Districts 2% and Independent special districts 1%. Money was spent by the country as follows: Constitutional officers 50%, County Commission 42%, state mandates 6%, outside agencies 1% and court services 1%.

In 2012 bonds issued by the county were given a rating of AA by the Fitch Group and improved ratings by Moody's.

The county assesses residents in the county only, for fire protection. Annual fees range from $39 for homes up to 700 square feet (65 m^{2}); up to $311 for homes over 2,600 square feet (240 m^{2}).

The total taxable real estate base was $33.7 billion in 2009. County taxes rose 26.5% in total per capita revenue from 2002–2007, and 49.8% in property tax per capita in the same time frame. Delinquent taxes were $36 million in 2008.

Solid waste management budgeted $33.4 million in fiscal year 2008/9 for county waste, not including municipalities which contract separately. In 2017, the county served about 97,000 residences. It charged $128.21 annually to pick up waste curbside. Of concern, was a $1.2 million reserve for extra removal of wastes resulting from hurricanes. This was considered too low. The deficiency was magnified by the fact that collection costs more than customers are being charged.

In 2010 municipalities and the county charged from $9.74 to $14.95 monthly for solid waste disposal. Most disposal was contracted out by the municipality to private vendors. Titusville and Rockledge each had a municipal operation.

The ex officio Space Coast League of Cities suggests legislation to its representatives.

The Brevard Metropolitan Planning Organization (MPO) is composed of senior locally elected municipal and county officials. This local multi-jurisdictional agency decides where federal and state road money will be used.

Various elected officials call unofficial "town meetings" to allow the public to express their concerns about issues that the officials should address.

The Brevard County Housing Authority acquires and leases housing projects; investigates housing conditions; determines where slums and unsafe housing exist and investigates conditions dangerous to the public. It is managed by citizens appointed by the county commission.

Brevard County has two unique election districts. One governs Port Canaveral; the other, the maintenance of the Sebastian Inlet.

The Canaveral Port Authority is an independent governmental agency created by the Florida Legislature. Five elected commissioners representing the five port regions are the governing body of Port Canaveral and have jurisdiction over all fiscal and regulatory policies and operations of the Port. The Authority sets policy and can levy taxes. They stopped levying an ad valorem tax on district residents, becoming only the second taxing authority in Florida to do so.

The county has hired a federal lobbyist to represent its interests.

Brevard expected to have 100,000-300,000 more people by 2020, an increase of 60%. This offers a challenge to local government to keep infrastructure ahead of growth, while preserving the environment.

Based on the mid-point of the growth estimates, if Brevard has 200,000 new residents by 2020, taxpayers will have to meet a list of new requirements, including: 400 more police officers and 362 more firefighters; 25 US gallons (95 L; 21 imp gal) million more per day of drinking water; 1,334 more teachers; 600 more jail beds. In 2009, the county expected to grow to 763,546 by 2030, a 42% increase.

The county got about $459 per resident in 2008 from the federal government. This ranks the metro among the bottom five metro areas that receive money based on population. This distribution is tied to income inequality. K In 2010, the state had 1,465 employees working in the county.

Ordinances in the county (as opposed to municipalities) can be noticeably different. For example, county land may be zoned as "agricultural" and therefore raise animals (other than pets). Even in county suburbs, residents may have one chicken. This would not be allowed in suburbs in municipalities.

== History ==
=== Libraries ===
Most of the libraries in Brevard County were initiated by a club or an interested group of citizens which started a library program in their area or city. The first five public libraries in the county - Cocoa, Cocoa Beach, Eau Gallie, Melbourne, and North Brevard in Titusville - were all started in this fashion.

=== State Representation ===
Prior to the creation of districts in 1967, state representatives were elected by county. Beginning in 1967, Brevard County was represented by the 71st, 72nd, 73rd, and 74th districts. Following redistricting in 1970, the county was represented by the 44th, 45th, 46th, 47th and 48th districts. Following redistricting in 1982, the county was represented by the 31st, 32nd, 33rd, 34th, 77th, and 78th districts. Following redistricting in 1992, the county was represented by the 29th, 30th, 31st, and 32nd districts. Following redistricting in 2002, the county was represented by the 29th, 30th, 31st, 32nd, and 80th districts.

=== County Growth and Emergency Response ===
Evacuation routes were insufficient to handle the resulting heavy traffic westbound when an emergency was declared. A major westbound route (US 192) was expanded in 2008 to four lanes to accommodate the south Brevard population.

==== Hurricanes ====
Between September 5 and September 25, the 2004 hurricane season brought three back-to-back hurricanes to Brevard County: Hurricanes Charley, Frances, and Jeanne.

In southern Brevard County, Hurricane Frances destroyed or substantially damaged nine single-family dwellings, a pool house, and a World War II observation tower. Frances also caused major damage to 35 single-family dwellings, 21 multifamily dwellings (condominiums, motels), five commercial buildings, a church building, a garage building, a pavilion, and a pool.

Along southern Brevard County, Hurricane Jeanne’s impact was even more catastrophic. Jeanne destroyed or substantially damaged 40 single-family dwellings, two motel buildings, a commercial building, two garage buildings, two pavilions, and a pool. Notably Jeanne destroyed a 100-ft. concrete seawall and a 50-ft. wooden return wall, causing a single-family dwelling to be undermined. The 56-year old Sea Grape Manor, built by the U.S. Coast Guard in 1948, lost its two motel wings with 10 units and a garage building when the dune line receded about 50 feet. The winds of Jeanne blew roof sections inland up to 350 feet from the building spreading debris across U.S. Highway A1A. At least five of the units were undermined and collapsed on the beach. Jeanne also caused major damage to 146 single-family dwellings, 26 multifamily dwellings (condominiums, motels, and duplexes), four commercial buildings, and a garage building.

Within two blocks of the beach nearly every building sustained some damage from Hurricane Jeanne. Barefoot Bay, a mobile housing development, was essentially destroyed. Winds tore off the roof of a shelter for special needs people in an elementary school. Emergency workers were forced to evacuate these people at the peak of the storm.

In September 2005, 1,400 survivors of Hurricane Katrina took refuge in the county.

=== County Commission ===
Robin Fisher was elected in 2007 as the first black commissioner in the county's history. He became the first black chairman of the county commission in 2010. The chair normally rotates among the commissioners.

In 2012, Andy Anderson was the first Commissioner to be elected without opposition since the 1970s.

Commissioners were paid $60,272.98 annually as of January 2023.

== Government officials ==
=== Local ===
The citizens of Brevard County are represented in the Brevard County Commission by five commissioners elected by district. They are:

- District 1 - Rita Pritchett, Vice Chair
- District 2 - Tom Goodson
- District 3 - John Tobia
- District 4 - Rob Feltner
- District 5 - Jason Steele, Chair

The County Manager is Frank B. Abbate.

The County Manager is the head of the executive branch of County Government, and is responsible to the Board of County Commissioners for the proper administration of all affairs of County Government not otherwise entrusted to an elected County officer. The Manager attends all regular and special meetings of the Board of County Commissioners and has the right to participate in its discussions.

The following are considered state officials but are elected and paid for by the County:

- Sheriff - Wayne Ivey
- Clerk of the Circuit Court - Rachel M. Sadoff
- Property Appraiser - Dana Blickley
- Tax Collector - Lisa Cullen
- Supervisor of Elections - Tim Bobanic
- State Attorney, 18th Judicial Circuit - Phil Archer
- Public Defender, 18th Judicial Circuit - Blaise Trettis

In April 2007, the Florida Department of Law Enforcement seized documents from the office of the County Appraiser in connection with an investigation into illegally re-appraising properties at lower values.

=== State ===
The county lies within two state senatorial districts, the 14th and 17th. They are held by Tom Wright and Debbie Mayfield.

The county lies within four state house representative districts. These seats are held by Vacant representing the 50th district, Tyler Sirois representing the 51st district, Thad Altman representing the 52nd district, and Randy Fine representing the 53rd district.

=== Federal ===
Brevard County lies within Florida's 8th congressional district which is represented by Mike Haridopolos. US Senators are Ashley Moody and Rick Scott.

== Justice system ==
=== Courts ===
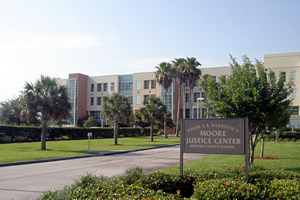
Harry T. and Harriette V. Moore Justice Center in Viera

The county has centralized most county and circuit courts in Viera which try a variety of cases including felonies, misdemeanors, traffic, and domestic. An elected State's Attorney prosecutes cases for the public. Defendants can be represented through the auspices of the office of the elected Public Defender. The 18th Circuit Court includes Seminole as well as Brevard and covers not only the court itself but the State's Attorney and the Public Defender.

The County elects a sheriff, directly responsible to the courts but also to the state for the enforcement of state laws. Police chiefs, appointed by their cities or towns, perform the same function locally. There is no overlap in jurisdictions. In 2019, there were 402 deputy sheriffs serving 230,780 people. Starting salaries were under $40,000. Some volunteers work alongside paid professionals in jurisdictions served by the sheriff, including the Citizens Observer Patrol and Civilian Mounted Posse programs.

There are five sheriff precincts: Cape Canaveral, East (Merritt Island), North (Titusville), West (Viera), and South (Melbourne).

Most municipalities are located on at least one waterway. This has resulted in the county and seven cities to have a boat or access to one to aid boaters, or enforce the law in the water in their jurisdiction.

The county jail is a 1985 facility which rapidly became overcrowded. Voters rejected expanding the jail on four occasions. The sheriff solved the problem by the construction of a large but less expensive "hardened tent" to house non-violent offenders. Crowding reached its peak in 2007 at 1,988 inmates, 300 over capacity. The budget for the facility was $42 million in 2010. There were 1,585 residents. Costs for feeding and housing was $72 per inmate daily. There were 475 staff members.

The county jail retains prisoners who have been sentenced to a year or less. Longer sentences must be served in state prisons, such as the facility in Sharpes for young men.

A unit of the Coast Guard, homeported at Port Canaveral, plays a role in preventing illegal immigration, and is an interdictor of drugs in the area. A U.S. Immigration and Customs Enforcement office is located in Cocoa Beach.

Brevard has a Drug Court to reduce the prison population resulting from drug issues. Drug Court programs adjudicate cases in which offenders are chronic substance abusers through an extensive supervision and treatment regimen. Drug Courts require offenders to acknowledge their problems with substances and provide him/her with tools and mechanisms to deal with their addictions, in an effort to reduce or eliminate future criminal conduct. The Drug Court program utilizes a team approach to serve the offenders and the team consists of a judge, prosecutor, defense attorney, treatment specialists, supervision officers, law enforcement agencies, corrections officials, and others. In exchange for successfully completing this intensive program, the Court may dismiss the charge, reduce the sentence, or offer a combination of other incentives. The police have estimated that 85% of drug dealers and prostitutes are themselves under the influence of drugs or are users trying to get money to purchase drugs.

Melbourne led the nation in MDMA seizures in 2005.

Brevard Legal Aid provides general, civil and domestic violence legal services to low income persons. Providers consist of five staff attorneys, three paralegals and 300 volunteer attorneys who offer pro bono assistance to referred eligible clients. Victims of domestic violence receive immediate need legal assistance with injunctions for protection through a partnership project with the Women's Center and the domestic violence shelters.

There is a local chapter of the American Civil Liberties Union (ACLU). In May 2005, the ACLU accused local police and Sheriff's offices of attempting to intimidate protests by conducting surveillance and filming them. As a result, authorities stopped the practice except for good cause.

The county justice system has faced criticism for its reliance on since-discredited dog handler John Preston as an expert witness in the 1980s. Brevard County paid Preston over $37,000 as a consultant in the first half of 1984.

The State's Attorney's Office sponsors the Victim/Witness Services. This provides advocates to victims of violent crime and their families. The advocate helps the family understand the legal system as they navigate through it. They also seek out financial assistance or counseling they might need. In 2005 they helped 8,448 victims in Brevard County.

=== Juvenile justice ===
The Rainwater Center for Girls, a day program for girls ages 12–18 who are referred by the Department of Juvenile Justice, offers education, vocational training, counseling, life skills, cultural arts activities, recreation, and community service focused on the developmental needs of girls.

The Department of Juvenile Justice refers selected youths to the Space Coast Marine Institute (SCMI). The SCMI is a six to eight month moderate security residential facility for juvenile boys ages 14–18 who have committed around 4-12 crimes. The young men arrive at the institute with little or no self-esteem and have experienced minimal positive interaction with adults and peers. The mission of SCMI is to address their needs by providing a scheduled curriculum of academic, vocational and mental health awareness activities. In addition to a personalized academic education, the daily schedule includes programs that build self-confidence and a greater understanding of the world around us.

Juvenile delinquents are sometimes remanded to the Brevard Sheriff's Ranch (Work Farm) in Rockledge, a small ranch with buffalo and other animals requiring care. During 2010, 613 offenders were sentenced to this program.

Reentry Brevard contracts with a contractor, often non-profit, to provide halfway services to youth conditionally released from prison.

A pilot program was started in 2007, involving family counseling and not jail. It had 79% success in keeping juveniles from re-offending in 2009.

=== Probation services ===
The county decided to privatize probation services in 2010, to save money. Savings are expected to exceed $211,000 annually. The department cost $2.86 million to operate in 2009. The former service employed 30 people. The new service, over 30, including most of the former employees.

== Public services ==
=== Public safety ===
Public safety for unincorporated areas of the county is the responsibility of the Brevard County Sheriff's Office. All but three of the 17 incorporated municipalities, Malabar, Cape Canaveral and Palm Shores, maintain their own law enforcement services. Those three contract that service to the Sheriff's Office. Of the 14 remaining municipalities, the Melbourne Police Department and Palm Bay Police Department have historically been the largest in the county, often surpassing each other in numbers of sworn officers. Public safety for Port Canaveral is under the direction of the Port Authority, and contracts with the Brevard County Sheriff's Office. Traditionally, emphasis was placed on monitoring the content of containerized cargo on incoming ships, as well as underwater inspection of arriving ships that could be carrying explosive devices. In 2008, the Canaveral Port Authority Board of Commissioners approved the creation of an independent police department.

The Brevard Emergency Operations Center (EOC) provides Homeland Security for the Space Coast. The EOC coordinates information regarding the occurrence or threat of any disaster or emergency threatening the safety of the County residents. The EOC uses telephone, television, and the Emergency Services of the County Sheriff, the City Police and Fire Departments to provide coordinated management of all services for cataclysmic events such as Hurricanes, Floods and Terrorism. The EOC has successfully conducted mass evacuation and relief of hundreds of thousands of residents from hurricanes since 1999 including two in 2004. Residents living on the barrier island and in manufactured homes were ordered to evacuate.

Brevard is part of an FDLE Florida Region 5 Regional(sic) Anti-Terrorism Task Force, along with neighboring counties.

The USCGC Confidence (WMEC-619), a Coast Guard Cutter home-ported at USCG Station Port Canaveral stops potentially threatening commercial shipping prior to reaching the coast. In 2010, there were 36,922 boats registered in the area. This number has dropped annually for the past four years. A few of these are of continuing concern to CG authorities.

Experience with hurricanes Charley, Frances and Jeanne in 2004 prompted the formation of the Brevard Long Term Recovery Coalition, consisting of United Way of America officials and other emergency-needs experts. They recorded the experiences Brevard had developed to restore services after the storms struck. In fall 2005, they passed information they had learned along to Gulf Coast planners attempting to recover from Katrina.

The media has estimated that 26,000 people who would need evacuation have not volunteered this information to Emergency Officials. In the past people have tended to postpone evacuation notification until after the causeways and bridges have been closed and no evacuation is possible.

There is a Federal Emergency Management Agency (FEMA) Regional Advisory Council based in Cocoa Beach.

The county posts lifeguards at 26 towers at various beach front parks during the peak season, five towers year around, four of the latter in Cocoa Beach. There are 17 lifeguards throughout the year; 100 seasonally, March through October; 46 at any one time. The county is 72 miles (116 km) long and most areas cannot be protected. The scope of responsibility for the lifeguards include accident and drowning prevention, public education, citizen assist, search and recovery of lost children, basic life support, and swimmer rescue. There have been 98 reported shark attacks in the county since 1882. The last fatality was in 1934. Ten drownings in 2007, prompted Forbes magazine to include the area in "World's Most Dangerous Beaches." In turn, this resulted in the county commission starting year around lifeguarding.

There are two Coast Guard Auxiliary Flotillas which offer boating safety courses.

North Brevard stands second in the state and the nation with 22,000 lightning strikes annually. Every two years there is an average of one person killed and three people injured from lightning.

Highway fatalities have decreased nationally, but by 2001, had increased in Florida and locally. Officials were focused on setting and enforcing speed limits and widening the local turnpike. The flatness of the area prevented runoff during rainstorms and caused cars to hydroplane. The highway department has taken measures to re-engineer roads to avoid hydroplaning. Fatalities reached a high of 99 in 2007. In 2009 there were 51 fatalities.

There are 64 fire stations in the county, 28 of which are run by various cities, and 33 by the county. There are 435 firefighters working for the county. A station completed by the county in 2011, cost $2.3 million.

In 2009, there were 1,200 law enforcement officers working in the county, of which 361 are sheriff's deputies. Of all crime that came to the attention of the sheriff's office in 2007, 80% was drug-related. From January to June 2009, the county reported a total of 10,037 crimes. Of these, a majority, 3.002, were under the jurisdiction of the sheriff's department.

In 2009, the crime rate was 3,471.3 property-related crimes per 100,000 residents, slightly above the national average.

A local Project Lifesaver can tag at-risk adults and children with locator devices. This allows guardians to track wandering people with Alzheimers, dementia, autism, etc.

=== Public health ===
The state has three public health locations in the county which give immunization shots, provide health information, and track and report on serious diseases or conditions, like HIV/AIDS, hepatitis, encephalitis, and West Nile virus. There have been several cases of West Nile in the 21st century. All victims recovered.

The area was once named "Mosquito County." Mosquitos carry serious diseases, including encephalitis. Brevard County Mosquito Control reduces the mosquito population by many means including adulticiding, larviciding, source reduction, aquatic weed control, waste tire abatement, disease monitoring (of chickens and mosquito-susceptible animals), environmental monitoring, and biological control of mosquitoes.

While no one has ever died from it in Brevard County, animal rabies is prevalent, often carried in this area by raccoons. Public announcements and public awareness appear to have prevented fatalities.

In 2005, a woman died from flesh-eating bacteria (Necrotizing fasciitis) that she contracted from the St. Johns River. Two or three cases are typically reported in the county each year.

An ocean condition known as "red tide" occasionally affects people beachside. This occurred in November–December 2007 and November–January 2002.

In 2010, there were 22 dentists out of 298 in the county that accepted Medicaid patients.

In 2010 there were 56,800 people on Medicaid; with 34,494 children that were eligible for Medicaid.

In 2011, 25% of the population under 65 did not carry medical insurance.

In one study in 2010, the county was ranked 23 out of 67 Florida counties for health outcomes.

=== Public recreation ===
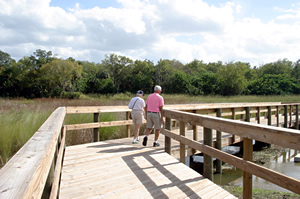
Boardwalk over wetlands area at Chain of Lakes in Titusville

More than 200 parks, 3 campgrounds, and 6 public golf courses in the county are managed by local government agencies. Offering residents and visitors a range of leisure opportunities, the parks include athletic complexes, community centers, aquatic centers, nature centers, trails, conservation areas, beach parks, historic sites, and boating and fishing access to lakes, the Indian River Lagoon and the St. Johns River.

In 2000, Brevard County voters approved bond referendums that provided funding for construction or improvement of over 50 county parks in North Brevard, Merritt Island, and South Brevard. Citizen Committees and Advisory Boards identified community recreational needs. These projects were submitted by the Recreation Advisory Boards to the Board of County Commissioners to be included in the referendum. While some projects are as simple as improved playground equipment, other projects are of a regional nature requiring extensive community planning, permitting and land acquisition. In November 2006, the Board of County Commissioners provided taxpayers the opportunity to vote on issuing additional bonds. The voters approved the additional bonds and with no tax rate increase resulting, because the millage previously approved generates the revenue to repay both sets of bonds.

In 11 sanctuaries that protect natural ecosystems, the county's Environmentally Endangered Lands (EEL) Program offers passive recreation opportunities such as hiking, wildlife viewing, biking and paddling.

In conservation areas managed by the St. Johns River Water Management District, recreational opportunities include hiking, bike and equestrian trails, camping, boating and fishing. Although the District's main goal of buying land is to protect water resources, these lands protect plant and wildlife habitat and provide areas for public recreation and environmental education.

The Merritt Island National Wildlife Refuge and the Canaveral National Seashore are 2 national wildlife refuges in the county that offer recreational pursuits such as hiking, wildlife viewing, paddling, and environmental education.

=== Libraries ===
The county centrally controls all 17 libraries in the county. There are over 1.2 million volumes, more than 112,000 video recordings and almost 62,000 sound recordings. One library card is valid at all locations, and materials are loaned between locations through a daily courier service and outside the library system via Inter-Library Loan. Periodical subscriptions stand at about 2,250. Personal computers for public use are hooked up to broadband in all libraries.

Special genealogy collections are available at the Central, Melbourne, and Titusville libraries.

Each library has meeting rooms which are available for library programming, and community meetings.

Youth programs are an important part of each library and a variety of programs are offered, including summer reading programs, story hour programs, toddler times and bedtime story programs.

Talking Books/Homebound Services provides library materials to residents with visual and physical impairments and to those with limitations associated with age. A special collection of Talking Books is provided by the National Library for the Blind to serve the visually impaired and physically disabled population. Homebound patrons are served by a mail service which provides standard library materials to patrons through a mail order catalog.

Each library maintains special collections for the physically and visually handicapped. These include a circulating collection of large print books and handheld assistive devices such as magnifiers. Large print terminals with special magnification and reading software are also available.

Down-loadable audio books and ebooks are available through Brevard County Libraries in a program called OverDrive with online instructions and selections for compatible audio and ebook devices.

In 2010, there were 207 full time workers. The operating budget was $16.4 million.

In 1989, the main library moved to a building contributed by Florida Today. It was the first in the county to discard the card catalog.

The 17 library branch locations in Brevard County are: Cape Canaveral Public Library, Central Brevard Library (Cocoa), Cocoa Beach Public Library, Eau Gallie Public Library, Franklin T. DeGroodt Library (Palm Bay), Dr. Martin Luther King, Jr. Library (Melbourne), Melbourne Public Library, Melbourne Beach Public Library, Merritt Island Public Library, Mims/Scottsmoor Public Library, Palm Bay Public Library, Port St. John Public Library, Satellite Beach Public Library, South Mainland Public Library (Micco), Suntree/Viera Public Library, Titusville Public Library, and West Melbourne Public Library.

=== Social services ===
Brevard County tries to provide a number of unique services to help the aged, juveniles, the physically and mentally handicapped, and minorities.

The Brevard Family of Housing uses federal money to help create and maintain affordable housing.

=== Utilities ===
The county-run water department had 66,000 residential and commercial customers in 2010.

== Municipal government ==
There are 16 autonomous municipal governments within the county. Cape Canaveral, Cocoa, Indian Harbour Beach, Melbourne, Palm Bay, Rockledge, Satellite Beach, Titusville, and West Melbourne, all have city councils. Cocoa Beach has a city commission. Grant-Valkaria, Indialantic, Malabar, and Palm Shores have town councils. Melbourne Beach and Melbourne Village have town commissions. The municipal decision-making bodies have from 5 to 7 members. The terms of office vary from 2 years in Indialantic and Melbourne Village to 4 years. Cape Canaveral, Cocoa, Malabar, Melbourne, Melbourne Beach, Palm Bay and Satellite Beach have term limits. The remainder do not. Cocoa, Malabar, and Melbourne have geographic districts for council members. The remainder elect their members at-large.

Salaries for municipal elected officials vary. In 2013, the highest paid was Melbourne's mayor: $10,350 annually. Five municipalities pay nothing to elected officials. The largest city with no salaries is Satellite Beach. The smallest city with salaries is Indialantic.
