= Steve Crisafulli =

American politician

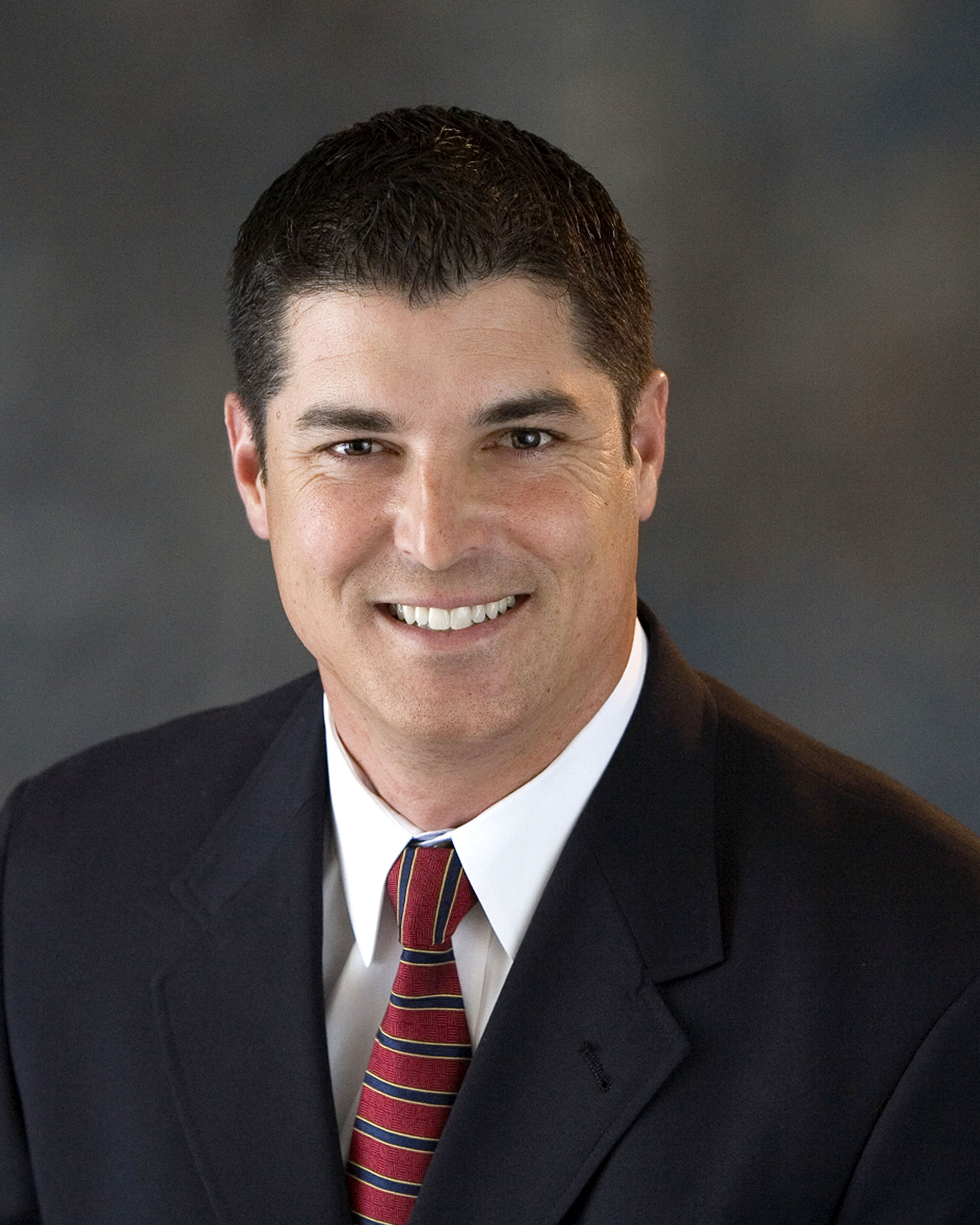
- Official portrait, 2009

99th Speaker of the Florida House of Representatives
- In office November 18, 2014 – November 22, 2016
- Preceded by: Will Weatherford
- Succeeded by: Richard Corcoran

Member of the Florida House of Representatives
- In office November 5, 2008 – November 8, 2016
- Preceded by: Tony Sasso
- Succeeded by: Tom Goodson
- Constituency: 32nd district (2008–2012); 51st district (2012–2016)

Personal details
- Born: July 26, 1971 (age 55) Rockledge, Florida, U.S.
- Party: Republican
- Spouse: Kristen Brown
- Children: 2
- Education: Brevard Community College (AA); University of Central Florida (BA)

Steve Crisafulli (born July 26, 1971) is an American politician who served as Speaker of the Florida House of Representatives from 2014 to 2016. He represented the 51st District, which is located in northern Brevard County, including Cape Canaveral, Cocoa, Cocoa Beach, and Rockledge, from 2008 to 2016.

== History ==
Crisafulli was born in Rockledge in 1971, into a political family, as his cousin, Doyle E. Carlton, served as Governor of Florida from 1929 to 1933, and his grandfather, Vassar B. Carlton, served as a Justice of the Florida Supreme Court from 1969 to 1974. He attended Brevard Community College, from which he received his associate degree, and the University of Central Florida, where he received his bachelor's degree. Following graduation, Crisafulli worked in his family's agribusiness. He was deeply involved in the Brevard county agricultural community, serving as a Director of the Brevard County Farm Bureau from 1996 to 2004, and again from 2006 to the present. He also served as the President of the Farm Bureau from 2003 to 2005. In 1998, he was elected to the Brevard County Soil and Water Conservation District, where he served until 2002.

== Florida House of Representatives ==
Crisafulli's career in the Florida House began in 2008, when he defeated Democratic incumbent Tony Sasso 52%–48% in Florida's 32nd House of Representatives district. Crisafulli ran unopposed in 2010 and 2012 and defeated Democrat Joe Murray with 67% of the vote to earn his final term in 2014.

When state legislative districts were redrawn in 2012, Crisafulli was moved into the 51st District, which dropped his previous district's reach into Orange County in exchange for more portions of northern Brevard County.

Following the 2012 elections, the House Republican Conference selected Crisafulli to serve as Speaker-Designate. He became House Speaker in November 2014 and termed out in November 2016.

Prior to becoming House Speaker, Crisafulli served in numerous other leadership positions, including:

- House Majority Leader (2013–2014)
- State Affairs Committee, Chair (2013)
- Agriculture & Natural Resources Subcommittee, Chair (2010–2012)

During his service in the Florida House, Crisafulli was an advocate for agriculture. As Speaker, he passed legislation to modernize Florida's water laws and he spearheaded opposition to Medicaid expansion under the Affordable Care Act.

Florida House of Representatives
| Preceded by Anthony "Tony" Sasso III | Member of the Florida House of Representatives from the 32nd district 2008–2012 | Succeeded by Larry Metz |
| Preceded by Larry Ahern | Member of the Florida House of Representatives from the 51st district 2012–2016 | Succeeded by Tom Goodson |
Political offices
| Preceded by Will Weatherford | Speaker of the Florida House of Representatives; 2014–2016 | Succeeded by Richard Corcoran |
