= Ralph Poppell =

American politician

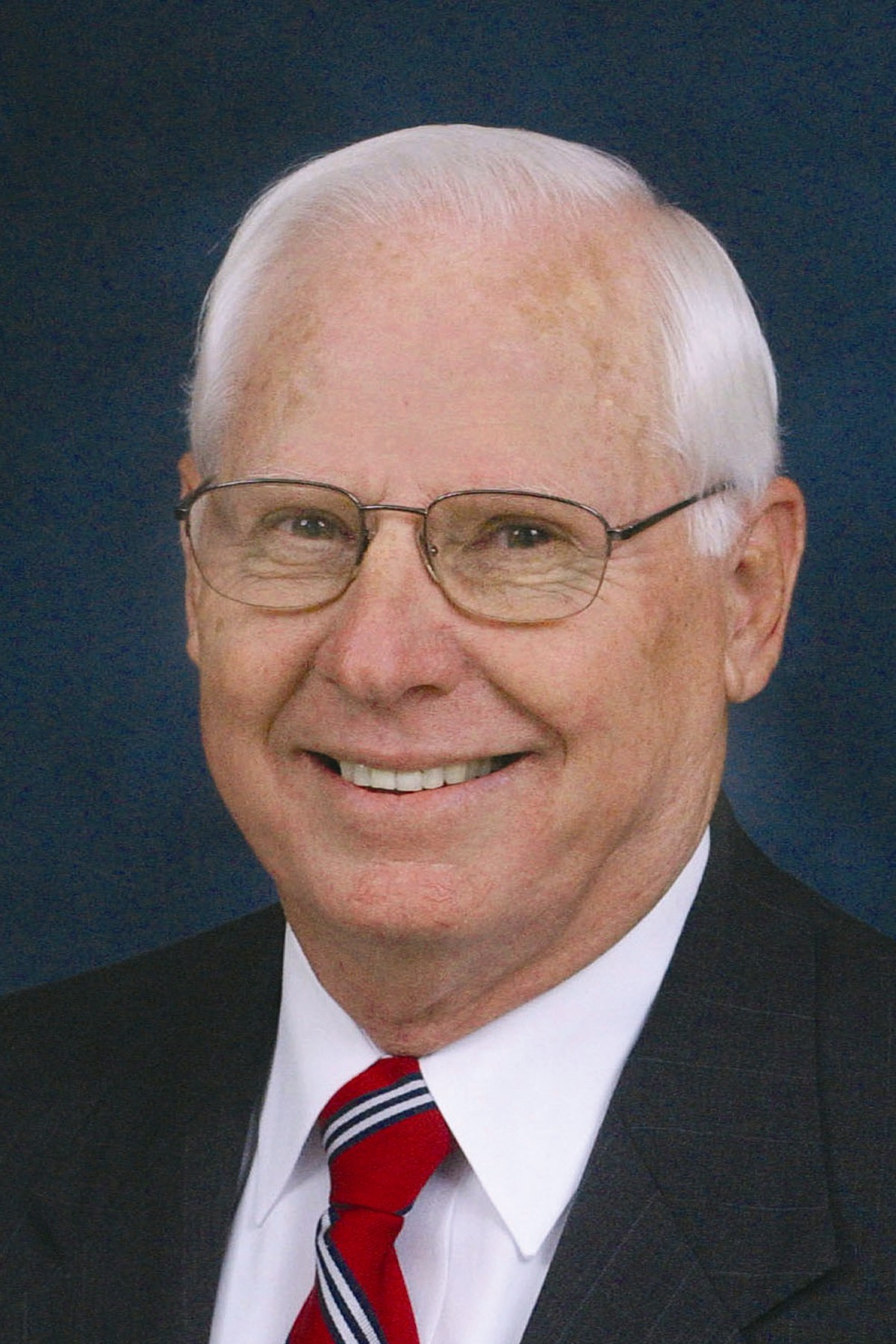

Member of the Florida House of Representatives from the 29th district
- In office November 5, 2002 – November 2, 2010
- Preceded by: Randy Ball
- Succeeded by: Tom Goodson

Personal details
- Born: April 30, 1941 (age 85)
- Party: Republican
- Spouse: Connie Poppell
- Children: Tim, Tamra, Tyler, Doug
- Education: United States Army Engineer School, Indian River Community College
- Profession: Manufacturing

Ralph Poppell (born April 30, 1941) is a Republican politician and businessman who served as a Representative in the Florida House of Representatives from 2002 to 2010.

== Early life and career ==
Poppell was born in Florida in 1941 and attended the United States Army Engineer School and Indian River Community College. He operated a 600-acre citrus farm on the Treasure Coast for several decades, and purchased Float-On, a manufacturer of boat trailers, in 1985.

== Florida House of Representatives ==
In 2000, incumbent Republican State Representative Charlie Sembler was term-limited and could not seek re-election. Poppell ran to succeed him in the 80th District, which included parts of Indian River and St. Lucie counties. He narrowly lost the primary, receiving 24 percent of the vote to Carole Jordan's 27 percent and Stan Mayfield's 26 percent, who both proceeded to a runoff election.

Poppell ran for the State House again in 2002, when State Representative Randy Ball, a Republican, was term-limited in District 29, which included parts of southern Brevard County and northern Indian River County. Poppell ran to succeed him in the 29th District. He won the Republican primary over retired teacher Pat Harrison and real estate agent Billy Nelson, receiving 45 percent of the vote to Harrison's 32 percent and Nelson's 22 percent. In the general election, he faced nonprofit executive Chris Stagman, the Democratic nominee, and contractor Craig Chamberlin, the Libertarian nominee. Poppell won by a wide margin, receiving 54 percent of the vote to Stagman's 42 percent and Chamberlin's 3 percent.

Poppell was re-elected unopposed in 2004 and 2006.

In 2008, Poppell was challenged by Democrat Wes McCarville, a United States Army veteran and University of Central Florida student who served as Vice Chair of the Brevard County Democratic Executive Committee. Poppell defeated McCarville in a landslide, receiving 59 percent of the vote.

Poppell was term-limited in 2010 and was succeeded by Republican Tom Goodson in the State House.
