= Dale Patchett =

American politician (1950–2023)

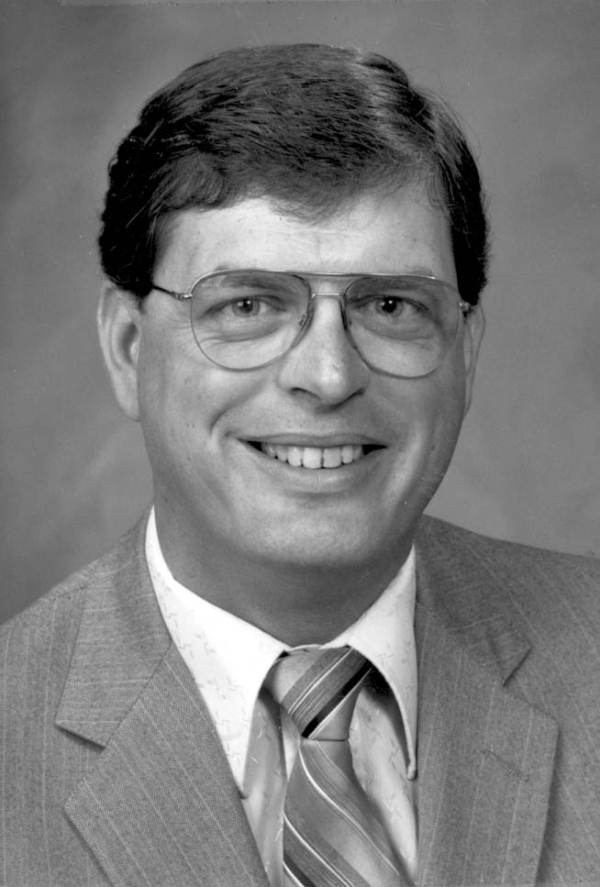

Member of the Florida House of Representatives
- In office November 2, 1976 – November 6, 1990
- Preceded by: Chester Clem
- Succeeded by: Charlie Sembler
- Constituency: 48th District (1976–1982); 80th District (1982–1990)

Personal details
- Born: April 21, 1950 Terre Haute, Indiana, U.S.
- Died: August 20, 2023 (aged 73)
- Party: Republican
- Spouse: Candy
- Occupation: Lobbyist, real estate broker, environmental consultant

Robert Dale Patchett (April 21, 1950 – August 20, 2023) was an American politician and lobbyist. He served as a Republican member of the Florida House of Representatives from 1976 to 1990, representing the 48th district.

== Life and career ==
Patchett was born in Terre Haute, Indiana, on April 21, 1950, and moved to Florida in 1973. Before entering politics, he worked as a real estate broker and environmental consultant.

He was elected to the Florida House of Representatives in 1976 and served until 1990. After his legislative career, Patchett became a lobbyist registered with the state of Florida, as well as continuing his work in real estate and environmental consulting.

In 1994, Patchett pleaded nolo contendere to ethics charges regarding unauthorized compensation received during his legislative tenure (Leon County Court Case Nos. 91-5209AMI and 91–5211). The case was later reviewed in Patchett v. Commission on Ethics, 626 So. 2d 319 (Fla. 1st DCA 1993).

Patchett died on August 20, 2023, at the age of 73.
