= Thad Altman =

Republican politician

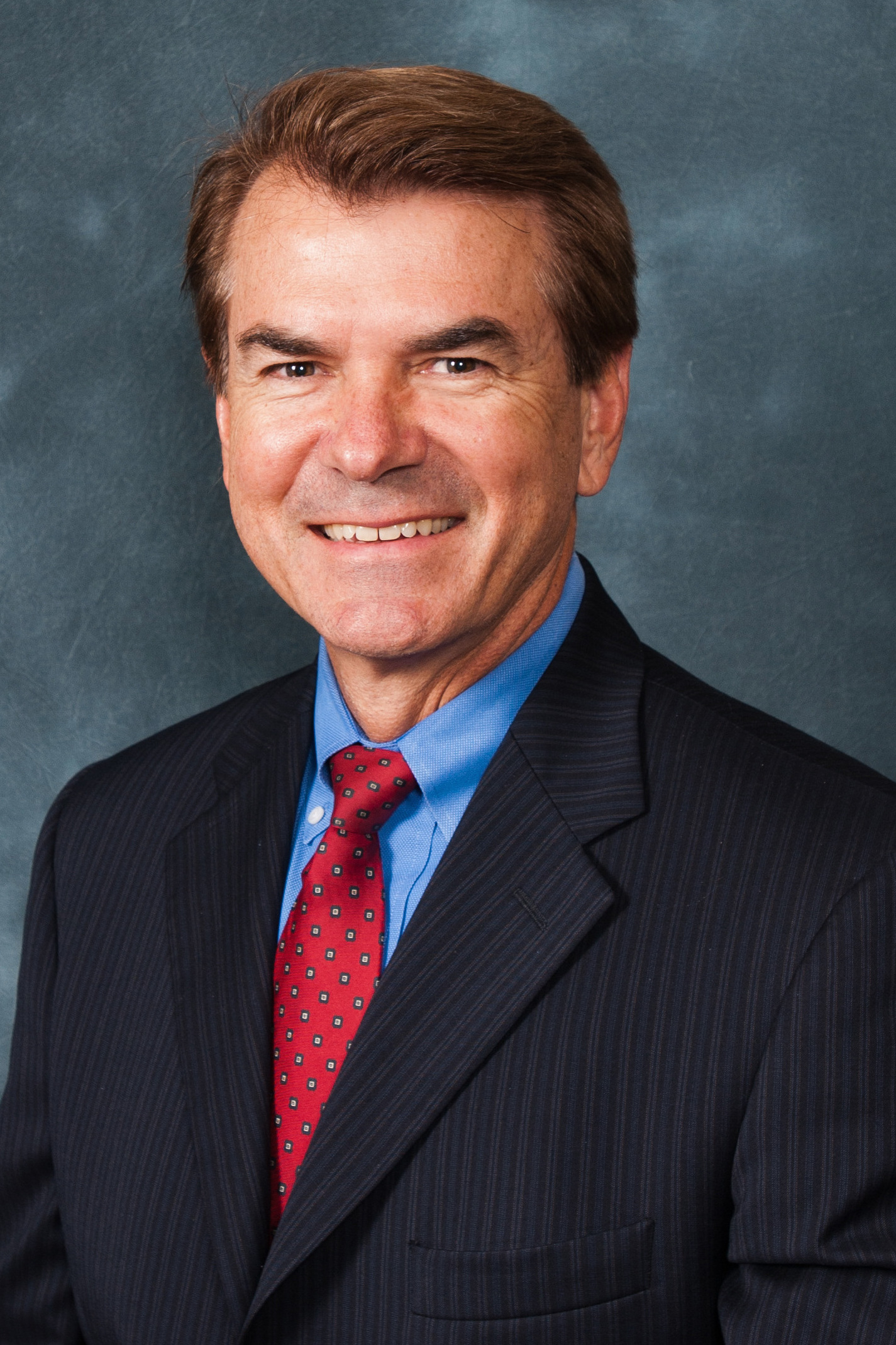

Member of the Florida House of Representatives
- In office November 8, 2016 – November 5, 2024
- Preceded by: Ritch Workman
- Succeeded by: Debbie Mayfield
- Constituency: 52nd district (2016–2022); 32nd district (2022–2024)
- In office March 27, 2003 – November 4, 2008
- Preceded by: Mike Haridopolos
- Succeeded by: Ritch Workman
- Constituency: 30th district

Member of the Florida Senate
- In office November 4, 2008 – November 8, 2016
- Preceded by: Bill Posey
- Succeeded by: Redistricted
- Constituency: 24th district (2008–2012); 16th district (2012–2016)

Member of the Brevard County Commission from the 5th district
- Incumbent
- Assumed office 2025
- In office 1984–1992
- Preceded by: Joe Wickham
- Succeeded by: Scott Ellis

Personal details
- Born: September 8, 1955 (age 71) Macon, Georgia, U.S.
- Party: Republican
- Spouse: Mary Pat Altman
- Children: 3
- Education: Brevard Community College (AA); University of Houston; Rollins College (BS)

Thad Altman (born September 8, 1955) is a Republican politician who served as a member of the Florida House of Representatives, representing parts of the Melbourne area in central Brevard County since 2016. Previously, he represented a similar area in the House from 2003 to 2008, and served in the Florida Senate from 2008 to 2016. He currently serves on the Brevard County Commission as chair.

== History ==
Altman was born in Macon, Georgia in 1955, and moved to Florida in 1957. He attended the University of Houston, where he played baseball, though he ultimately graduated from Brevard Community College with his associate degree and from Rollins College with his bachelor's degree.

== Brevard County Commission ==
In 1984, Altman ran for the Brevard County Commission in the 5th District. He faced Eldon Moen, Norm Crank, and J. Preston Silvernail in the Republican primary, and received the most votes, winning 47% of the vote. However, because no candidate won a majority, Altman and the second-place finisher, Moen, competed in a runoff election that Altman won by a wide margin, receiving 63% of the vote to Moen's 37%. In the general election, Altman was opposed by Ed Rainis, the Democratic nominee. Altman won his first term in a landslide, winning 61% of the vote to Rainis's 39%.

When Altman ran for re-election in 1988, he was opposed by Ed Washburn, a city planner and the Democratic nominee. Altman campaigned on his environmental record, specifically efforts to restrict coastal building, reducing densities on beaches, creating no-wake zones for boats in manatee habitats, and a countywide growth management plan. Washburn attacked Altman for "irresponsibly" squandering the county's $18 million reserve fund, noting, "They've mishandled the financial situation. We need to reduce irresponsible government spending and subsequent tax increases." The Orlando Sentinel endorsed Altman for re-election, citing his "strong pro-environment reputation," though noting that "he must be more decisive in his second term and get [Brevard County] to make some real progress in coping with growth and becoming [financially] solvent." Altman only narrowly won re-election over Washburn, receiving 52% of the vote to Washburn's 48%.

During his second term on the Commission, Altman supported the decision to maintain its county government complex in Viera, and opposed efforts by other county commissioners to withdraw from its lease and to put the question to county voters in a special referendum. The decision to maintain the complex and to not hold a referendum was controversial, and led to Altman's decision not to seek re-election to his County Commission seat in 1992. Instead, Altman ran for Brevard County Supervisor of Elections. He lost in the Republican primary to Fred Galey by a wide margin, winning only 38% of the vote to Galey's 62%. Following his departure from the County Commission, he received a position working in government affairs for the South Brevard Chamber of Commerce.

He ran in 2024 and won beating Democrat Vinnie Taranto Jr 58%-42%. He currently serves as Chair of the Brevard County Commission.

== Florida House of Representatives ==
In 2000, following the inability of State Representative Bill Posey to seek re-election due to term limits, Altman ran to succeed him in the 32nd District, which stretched from Orlando to Vero Beach in Brevard, Indian River, and Orange Counties. He faced Bob Allen Pat Harrison, David Hobbs, and Mark Cook in the Republican primary. Allen won the endorsement of the Sentinel, which noted that, although both he and Altman were "well-qualified and have done some serious, substantive thinking about pressing issues facing the state," Allen had the greater "breadth of vision." Though Altman ended up placing first in the primary, winning 28% of the vote to Allen's 23%, because no candidate won a majority, a runoff election was held between the two. This time, however, Altman lost to Allen, winning only 45% of the vote to Allen's 55%.

Following the death of State Senator Howard Futch in 2003, State Representative Mike Haridopolos ran in a special election to succeed him, resigning his House seat in the process. Altman ran in the special election to succeed Haridopolos in the 30th District, based in southern Brevard County. Altman faced a crowded Republican primary, and was opposed by Ritch Workman, Joe Steckler, Palm Bay Mayor Ed Geier, Eric Boritzki, and Jerry M. Abrams. During the primary, Altman campaigned on his support for growth management, environmental protection, and improving public education, noting, "The problem with education is not just a money problem. We need to give teachers the ability to teach to the needs of the students, not the needs of the test." He won the primary by a wide margin, winning 41% of the vote to Workman's 29%, Steckler's 18%, and Geier's 12%, and advanced to the general election, where he faced only Libertarian candidate Bruce Wechsler. Altman won the general election convincingly, receiving 72% of the vote to Wechsler's 28%.

Running for re-election in 2004, Altman was opposed by former West Melbourne City Councilwoman Shirley Bradshaw, the Democratic nominee. Altman campaigned for re-election on his support for public education and his funding for local projects in Brevard County, while Bradshaw announced that she was running because the county's all-male legislative delegation did not represent her as a woman. He ended up winning re-election by a large margin, receiving 63% of the vote to Bradshaw's 37%. He was re-elected without opposition in 2006.

== Florida Senate ==
State Senator Bill Posey opted to run for Congress in 2008, rather than seek re-election in the State Senate. Altman ran to succeed him in the 24th District, which included Brevard County, eastern Orange County, and eastern Seminole County. Altman won the Republican primary uncontested, and faced Kendall Moore, a former Rockledge City Councilman and the Democratic nominee, in the general election. Both parties made investments in the race, with the Republican Party attacking Moore for allegedly raising taxes during his tenure on the City Council, while the Democratic Party attacked Altman for "being too cozy with the insurance industry." The Sentinel endorsed Altman, praising him as "a knowledgeable and diligent lawmaker" with a "smart approach," noting that while Moore was "articulate on problems facing the district and the state," he was "vague on how to address them." Despite the perceived closeness of the race, Altman defeated Moore handily, winning 59% of the vote to Moore's 41%.

When Altman ran for re-election in 2010, he was opposed in the Republican primary by healthcare administrator Bart Carmichael, who alleged that Altman and other legislators were fiscally irresponsible. The Sentinel again endorsed Altman, noting that he was a "pragmmatic and effective lawmaker," and criticizing Carmichael for declaring bankruptcy. Altman won renomination handily, scoring 68% of the vote to Carmichael's 32%. In the general election, he was opposed only by small business owner Steve Edmonds, an independent candidate. Both candidates agreed on the importance of keeping NASA jobs in the district at Kennedy Space Center, though Altman argued that, as a member of the Republican majority, he was more effective than Edmonds could be. Altman defeated Edmonds in a landslide, receiving 67% of the vote to his opponent's 33%.

In 2012, following the reconfiguration of the state's legislative districts, Altman ran for re-election in the 16th District, which included most of the territory that he had previously represented. He was unopposed in the Republican primary, but faced Democrat Dominic Fallo in the general election. The editorial board of Treasure Coast Newspapers endorsed him for his next term in the Senate, noting that Fallo appeared to be a candidate fronted by the Florida Democratic Party, which paid his filing fee, so that Altman would be opposed for re-election. Fallo did not present a major challenge to Altman, winning only 37% of the vote to Altman's 63%.

In his final bid for re-election to the Senate, Altman faced Monique Miller in the Republican primary. During the campaign, he was attacked by the National Association for Gun Rights, which criticized Altman's 2013 vote to prevent people who were committed to mental health facilities from purchasing guns. Altman condemned the attacks as "outrageous" and "blatant, flat-out lies," noting that he was endorsed by the National Rifle Association of America. Despite the attack, Altman won the primary over Miller convincingly, receiving 65% of the vote to Miller's 35%.

== Return to the Florida House ==
Altman's Senate term would have originally terminated in 2018, and he filed to run for the Florida House of Representatives in the 51st District that year. However, following litigation over the state's Senate maps, new districts were put in place for the 2016 elections, which meant that Altman's term was up two years earlier than initially thought. Therefore, he withdrew his candidacy in the 51st District in 2018 and instead opted to run for the open 52nd District in 2016.

== See also ==
- Florida House of Representatives

Florida House of Representatives
Preceded by Mike Haridopolos	Member of the Florida House of Representatives from the 30th district 2003–2008	Succeeded by Ritch Workman
Preceded by Ritch Workman	Member of the Florida House of Representatives from the 52nd district 2016–2022	Succeeded by John Temple
Preceded by Anthony Sabatini	Member of the Florida House of Representatives from the 32nd district 2022–2024	Succeeded by Debbie Mayfield
Florida Senate
Preceded by Bill Posey	Member of the Florida Senate from the 24th district 2008–2012	Succeeded by Tom Lee
Preceded by Jack Latvala	Member of the Florida Senate from the 16th district 2012–2016	Succeeded by Jack Latvala
