= Randy Ball =

Randy Ball may refer to:

- Randy Ball (American football)
- Randy Ball (politician)
