= Senator Mayfield (disambiguation) =

Earle B. Mayfield (1881–1964) was a U.S. Senator from Texas from 1923 to 1929. Senator Mayfield may also refer to:

- Debbie Mayfield (born 1956), Florida State Senate
- Julie Mayfield (born 1967), North Carolina State Senate
