= Jha =

Jha or JHA may refer to:

== Jha ==
- Jha (surname), a Maithil Brahmin & Mahapatra Brahmin surname native. India and Nepal
- Jha (Indic), a glyph in the Brahmic family of scripts

== JHA ==
- Job hazard analysis or job safety analysis
- Justice and Home Affairs, the former name for a pillar of the European Union
- Jacksonville Housing Authority, Florida, USA
- Japan Handball Association
- Juvenile hormone analogue
