= Tony Sasso =

American politician

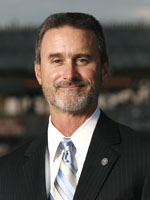

Member of the Florida House of Representatives from the 32nd district
- In office February 28, 2008 – November 5, 2008
- Preceded by: Bob Allen
- Succeeded by: Steve Crisafulli

Personal details
- Born: January 9, 1953 (age 73) Jersey City, New Jersey, U.S.
- Party: Democratic
- Children: Anthony P. Sasso IV; Benjamin Armond Sasso
- Education: Calhoon Engineering School

Anthony P. "Tony" Sasso III (born January 9, 1953) is a Democratic politician and environmental activist who served as a member of the Florida House of Representatives in 2008. He was elected in a February 26, 2008, special election to succeed Republican State Representative Bob Allen, and was defeated in the 2008 general election by Steve Crisafulli.

== Early life ==
Sasso was born in Jersey City, New Jersey, and moved to Florida in 1955. He worked as a ship inspector, and was trained at the Calhoon Engineering School.

== Political career ==
In 2001, Sasso ran for Seat 4 on the Cocoa Beach City Commission, following the retirement of incumbent Commissioner Al Cleveland. He campaigned as a "pro-resident candidate dedicated to a low-density residential and family-oriented resort community," criticizing local leaders for overriding public support for building restrictions. He defeated his opponent, Geo Ropert, in a landslide, receiving 68 percent of the vote in a high-turnout election.

Sasso was re-elected without opposition in 2004, and declined to seek re-election in 2007.

== Florida House of Representatives ==
In 2007, Republican State Representative Bob Allen, who represented the 32nd District, was arrested for solicitation to commit prostitution, and he resigned his seat on November 16, 2007, effective upon the election of his successor in a special election. Governor Charlie Crist scheduled a special election for February 26, 2008, in the district, which included eastern Orange County and northern Brevard County.

Sasso announced that he would run as a Democratic candidate in the special election, and faced real estate investor Anthony LaCourt in the Democratic primary. Sasso was endorsed by the Orlando Sentinel, which praised him for "champion[ing] managed growth and environmental issues" on the City Commission and criticized LaCourt for "show[ing] almost no knowledge of state issues." Sasso defeated LaCourt in a landslide, winning the nomination with 69 percent of the vote.

In the general election, Sasso faced Sean Campbell, the Republican nominee, and independent Jerry Maynard. The Sentinel and Florida Today both endorsed Sasso over Campbell and Maynard. The Sentinel criticized Campbell as "woefully unprepared to serve in Tallahassee" and "lack[ing] even the basic knowledge of how Florida's tax structure or its school system works," and praised Sasso for having "the experience and command of the issues." Florida Today likewise criticized Campbell for his "troubling lack of knowledge about key issues" and noted that Sasso "offers the kind of moderate, bipartisan leadership that Republican and independent voters should recognize and support."

Sasso ultimately defeated Campbell by a narrow margin, winning 48 percent of the vote to 46 percent, in an upset victory.

He ran for re-election later that year, and was challenged by citrus farmer Steve Crisafulli, who won the Republican nomination unopposed. Sasso's seat was targeted by the state Republican Party as a pickup opportunity, with state party chair Jim Greer pledging that Republicans would regain the seat.

In the general election, Florida Today endorsed Sasso for re-election, while the Sentinel endorsed Crisafulli over Sasso. Florida Today noted that Crisafulli was a "thoughtful contender with potential for leadership in our community," but endorsed Sasso as "a hard worker willing to cross party lines." The Sentinel praised Sasso for his focus on "better growth management," but criticized him for his reluctance to support commuter rail, which Crisafulli supported.

Sasso ultimately lost to Crisafulli by a narrow margin, receiving 48 percent of the vote to Crisafulli's 52 percent, after Crisafulli significantly outraised him.

== Subsequent career ==
Following his defeat in 2008, Sasso was appointed the executive director of Keep Brevard Beautiful, an environmental non-profit organization, in 2012, and he stepped down in 2019.
