= Adam Botana =

American politician

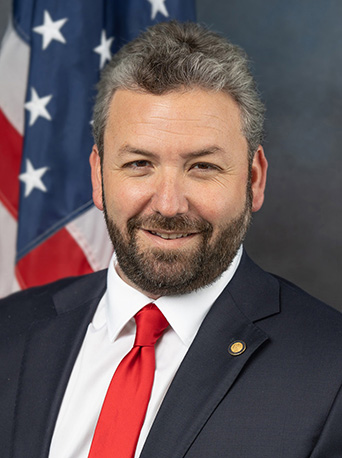

Member of the Florida House of Representatives from the 76th (2020–2022) 80th (2022-present) district
- Incumbent
- Assumed office November 3, 2020
- Preceded by: Ray Rodrigues

Personal details
- Born: April 27, 1984 (age 42) Naples, Florida, U.S.
- Party: Republican

Adam A. Botana (born April 27, 1984) is an American politician serving as a member of the Florida House of Representatives from the 80th district. He assumed office on November 3, 2020.

== Early life ==
Botana was born in Naples, Florida and lives in Bonita Springs. Botana has a GED and has worked in the carnival industry.

== Career ==
Botana is the vice president of the Bay Water Boat Club, his family's business. He has also worked in the food and beverage industry. Botana was elected to the Florida House of Representatives in November 2020. Botana partially campaigned on a platform of water policy. After assuming office, he was assigned to the House Health & Human Services Committee and House Agriculture & Natural Resources Appropriations Subcommittee.
