= Brian Hodgers =

American politician

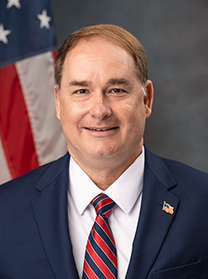

Member of the Florida House of Representatives from the 32nd district
- Incumbent
- Assumed office June 10, 2025
- Preceded by: Debbie Mayfield

Personal details
- Party: Republican
- Website: brianforflorida.com

Brian Hodgers is an American politician. He serves as a Republican member for the 32nd district in the Florida House of Representatives since a 2025 special election.

Hodgers is a business owner and realtor from Brevard County, Florida.
