= Mike Davis (Florida politician) =

American politician (1947–2007)

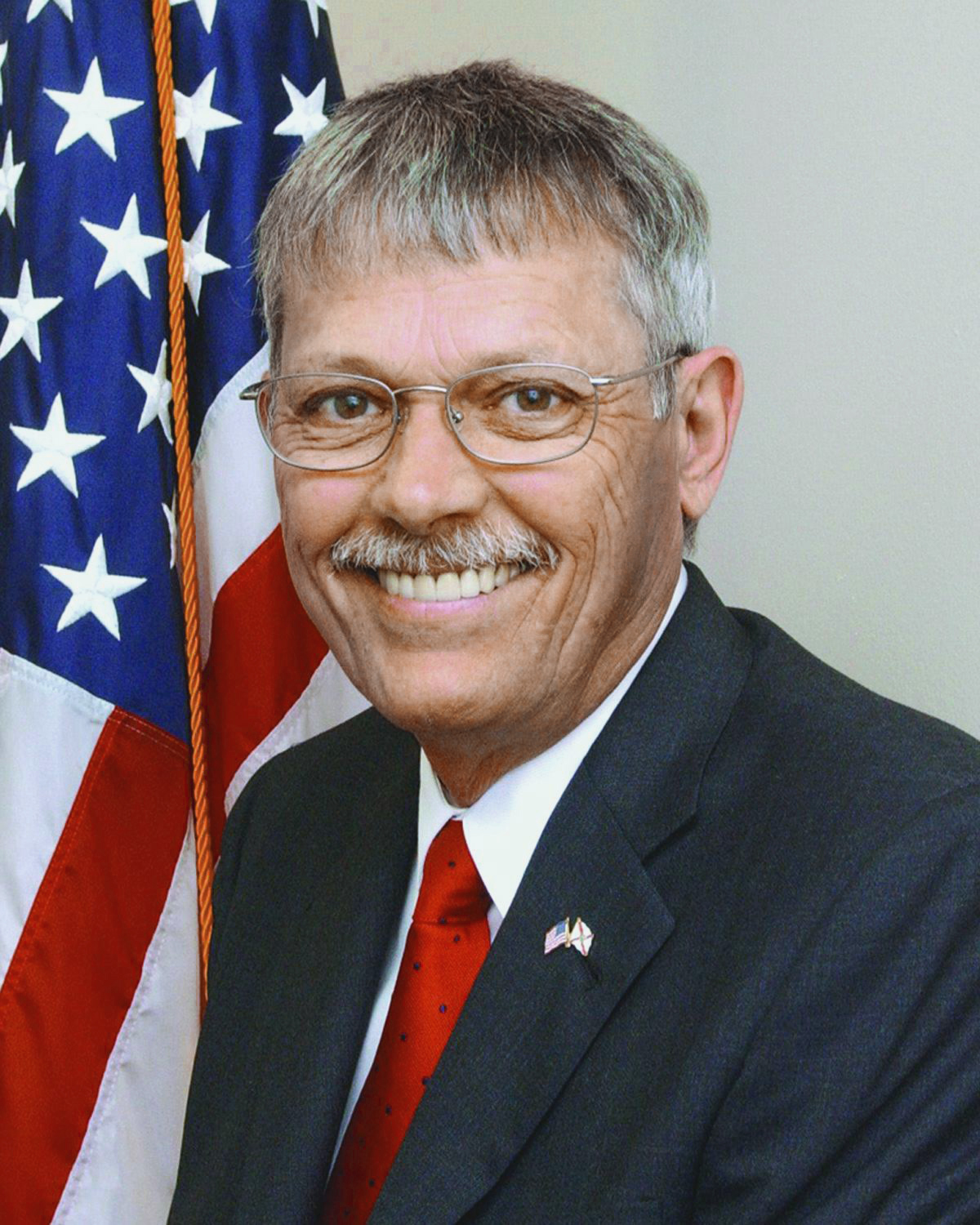

Member of the Florida House of Representatives from the 101st district
- In office November 5, 2002 – September 12, 2007
- Preceded by: Kenneth Gottlieb
- Succeeded by: Matt Hudson

Personal details
- Born: February 10, 1947 Columbus, Ohio
- Died: September 12, 2007 (aged 60) Naples, Florida
- Party: Republican
- Spouse: Patricia Shullo
- Education: Ohio State University
- Occupation: Businessman

Military service
- Allegiance: United States
- Branch/service: United States Coast Guard
- Years of service: 1966–1969

Mike Davis (February 10, 1947 – September 12, 2007) was a Republican politician from Florida who served as a member of the Florida House of Representatives from the 101st district from 2002 until his death in 2007.

== Early life ==
Davis was born in Columbus, Ohio, in 1947, and served in the U.S. Coast Guard during the Vietnam War. He later attended Ohio State University and moved to Florida in 1974, settling in Golden Gate. He ran a sign company and was a community advocate for the construction of affordable housing.

== Florida House of Representatives ==
In 2002, Davis ran for the Florida House of Representatives from the newly created 101st district, which stretched from Pembroke Pines in Broward County to Naples in Collier County. He won the Republican primary unopposed, and faced Democrat Gary Shirk, an attorney, and Libertarian Michael Shane O'Brien, an automobile technician, in the general election. Davis won the general election by a wide margin, receiving 58 percent of the vote to Shirk's 38 percent and O'Brien's 4 percent.

Davis was unopposed for re-election in 2004 and 2006. In 2007, following the end of the legislative session, Davis announced that he would not seek re-election to a fourth and final term in 2008, citing health reasons.

== Death ==
Davis died on September 12, 2007.
