= Debbie Mayfield =

American politician

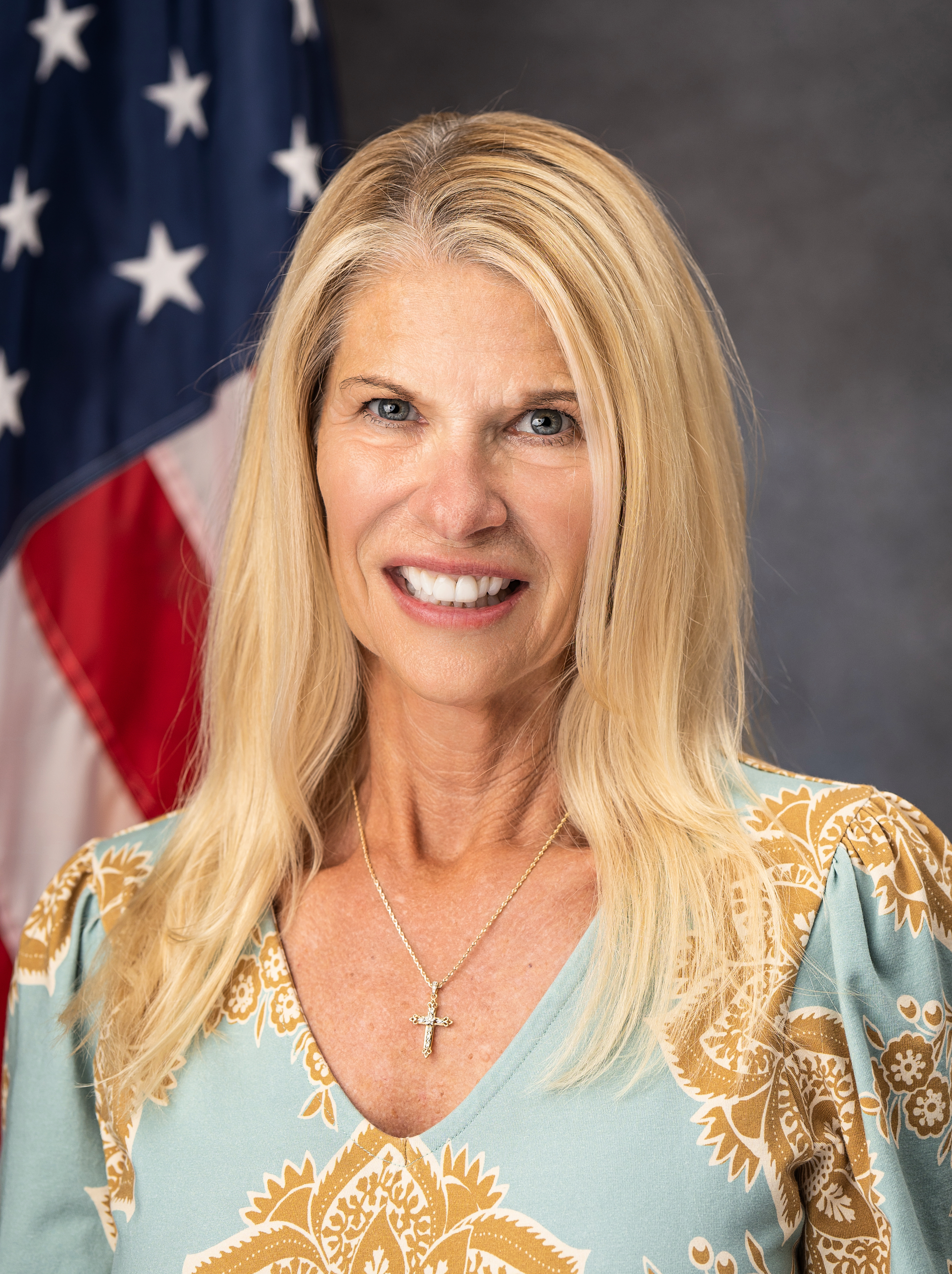
- Official portrait, 2024

Member of the Florida Senate
- Incumbent
- Assumed office June 10, 2025
- Preceded by: Randy Fine
- Constituency: 19th district
- In office November 8, 2016 – November 5, 2024
- Preceded by: Thad Altman (redistricting)
- Succeeded by: Randy Fine
- Constituency: 17th district (2016–2022); 19th district (2022–2024)

Member of the Florida House of Representatives from the 32nd district
- In office November 5, 2024 – June 10, 2025
- Preceded by: Thad Altman
- Succeeded by: Brian Hodgers
- In office November 4, 2008 – November 8, 2016
- Preceded by: Stan Mayfield
- Succeeded by: Erin Grall
- Constituency: 80th district (2008–2012); 54th district (2012–2016)

Majority Leader of the Florida Senate
- In office November 23, 2020 – November 14, 2022
- Preceded by: Kathleen Passidomo
- Succeeded by: Ben Albritton

Personal details
- Born: Deborah Janell Minton; December 2, 1956 (age 69) Pensacola, Florida, U.S.
- Party: Republican
- Spouse: Stan Mayfield (m. 1976; died 2008)
- Children: 3
- Education: Santa Fe College

Deborah Janell Mayfield (née Minton; born December 2, 1956) is an American politician serving since 2025 as a Republican member of the Florida Senate. She previously served in the Florida House of Representatives from 2024 to 2025 and from 2008 to 2016. She served in the Florida Senate from 2016 to 2024 and was the Senate Majority Leader from 2020 to 2022.

== Early life and career ==
Mayfield was born and raised in Pensacola, Florida, where she attended Pensacola High School.

She moved to Vero Beach in 1989, and began working for Barnett Bank, eventually rising up to Senior Vice-President of Residential Lending. Mayfield later left the bank to start the Mayfield Group, a mortgage brokerage firm that she owned and operated.

== Florida House of Representatives ==
When incumbent State Representative Stan Mayfield, her husband, was unable to seek re-election in 2008 due to term limits, she ran to succeed him in the 80th District, which ran along the Treasure Coast, including northern St. Lucie County, eastern Indian River County, and southeastern Brevard County. She won the Republican primary unopposed, and advanced to the general election, where she faced Neal Abarbanell, the Democratic nominee. During the course of the campaign, Mayfield's husband, who was running for Indian River County Tax Collector, died of cancer. Despite this, Mayfield ended up defeating Abarbanell by a wide margin of victory, winning 64% of the vote.

In 2010, she was challenged in the Republican primary by Art Argenio and Bradley Ward, who hammered Mayfield for being insufficiently conservative, despite the fact that she voted "consistently with the GOP majority." Mayfield ended defeating both of them handily, winning 52% of the vote to Argenio's 34% and Ward's 15%, and in the general election, she only faced write-in opposition, winning easily.

In 2012, when state legislative districts were redrawn, Mayfield was moved into the 54th District, which included much of the territory that she had previously represented in the 80th District. She won both the primary and general election entirely unopposed.

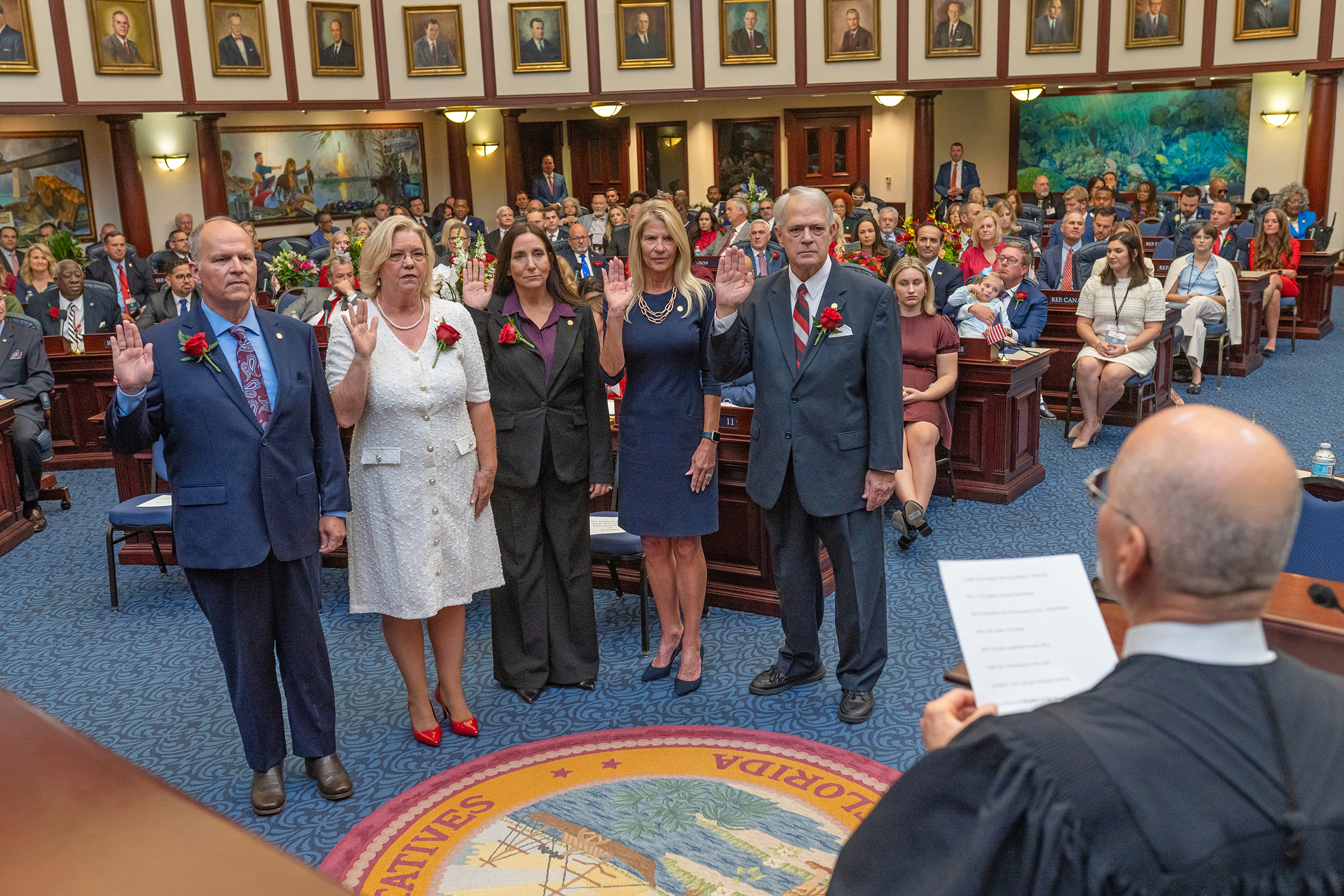
Swearing in of Florida State Representatives, 2024

In 2024, Mayfield defeated former Florida congressman Dave Weldon in the Republican primary for the Florida House's 32nd district. She went on to defeat Democrat Juan Hinojosa in the general election, succeeding Thad Altman. She was ceremonially sworn into office on November 19, 2024.

Upon the announcement of the resignation of Randy Fine from the Florida Senate in November 2024, Mayfield announced her candidacy for her old senate seat in the 2025 Florida Senate special election. Due to Florida's resign-to-run law, after announcing her candidacy for the Florida Senate, Mayfield submitted her resignation from the Florida House of Representatives, effective June 10, 2025. She was succeeded by fellow Republican Brian Hodgers.

== Florida Senate ==
In 2016, Mayfield ran for the Florida Senate seat vacated by Thad Altman, who was term-limited. She defeated fellow State Representative Ritch Workman in the Republican primary, 42 to 35%, and Democrat Amy Tidd in the general election, 62 to 38%.

In 2020, Senate president Wilton Simpson appointed Mayfield as Majority Leader.

Due to term limits, Mayfield was barred from re-election to the Florida Senate in 2024, opting instead to run for the Florida House of Representatives.

On April 2, 2025, Mayfield won the Republican primary for the Florida Senate's 19th district. On June 10, 2025, Mayfield was re-elected to the Florida Senate.

== Personal life ==
Mayfield is a Roman Catholic. She is the widow of Stan Mayfield and lives in Melbourne, Florida.

Florida House of Representatives
Preceded by Stan Mayfield	Member of the Florida House of Representatives from the 80th district 2008–2012	Succeeded by Matt Hudson
Preceded by Jim Frishe	Member of the Florida House of Representatives from the 54th district 2012–2016	Succeeded by Erin Grall
Preceded by Thad Altman	Member of the Florida House of Representatives from the 32nd district 2024–2025	Succeeded by Brian Hodgers
Florida Senate
Preceded by John Legg	Member of the Florida Senate from the 17th district 2016–2022	Succeeded by Linda Stewart
Preceded by Darryl Rouson	Member of the Florida Senate from the 19th district 2022–2024	Succeeded by Randy Fine
Preceded by Randy Fine	Member of the Florida Senate from the 19th district 2025–present	Incumbent
Preceded by Kathleen Passidomo	Majority Leader of the Florida Senate; 2020–2022	Succeeded by Ben Albritton
