= Bob Allen (Florida politician) =

American politician (born 1958)

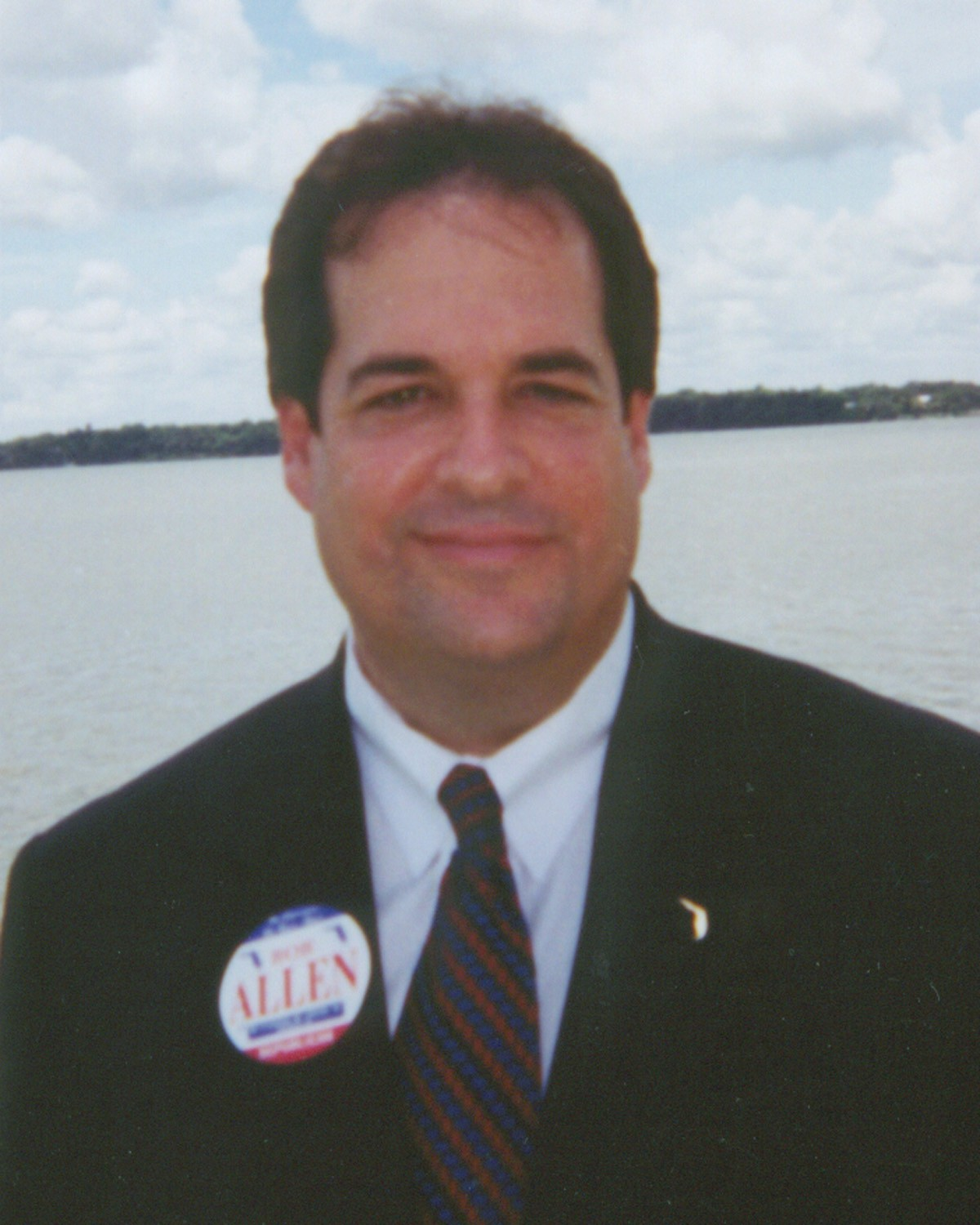

Member of the Florida House of Representatives from the 32nd district
- In office January 25, 2000 – February 26, 2008
- Preceded by: Bill Posey
- Succeeded by: Tony Sasso

Personal details
- Born: September 30, 1958 (age 67)
- Party: Republican
- Spouse: Beth Elaine Allen
- Education: Valencia Community College
- Profession: Economic Development/Education

Bob Allen (born 1958) is an American Republican politician and member of the Florida House of Representatives from 2000 until 2008, representing the 32nd district. His district included portions of Brevard and Orange Counties.

Between 2003 and 2006, Allen voted over 90 percent of the time with the Christian Coalition. Allen was charged in 2007 with solicitation of a male police officer in a park restroom. He was found guilty and sentenced to six months' probation and fined. At the urging of Republican leaders, he resigned.

== Early life and education ==
Born in 1958, Allen was raised in Florida and received his Associate of Arts degree from Valencia Community College.

== Political career ==
Before being elected to the Florida House, Allen served as executive director of Martin County's Economic Council.

He made headlines in 2007 after being arrested for offering $20 for the opportunity to perform fellatio on an undercover male police officer in the restroom of a public park and was released on bail. Since the time of his arrest, Allen maintained his innocence, stating that he believed the undercover police officer was trying to rob him, and that he only offered to perform oral sex because he felt intimidated by the muscular police officer. Allen was convicted on November 9, 2007, and sentenced to six months' probation, and was fined $250. He submitted his letter of resignation on November 16, 2007, which went into effect when his successor was elected on February 26, 2008.

=== Florida House of Representatives ===
Representative Allen served on the following committees:

- Committee on Energy
- Environmental and Natural Resources Council

In 2009, Newsweek listed Allen among other conservative and liberal politicians who were caught in sex scandals.

Preceded by Bill Posey	Florida Representative, 32nd District; January 25, 2000 – February 26, 2008	Succeeded by Tony Sasso
