= Ritch Workman =

American politician

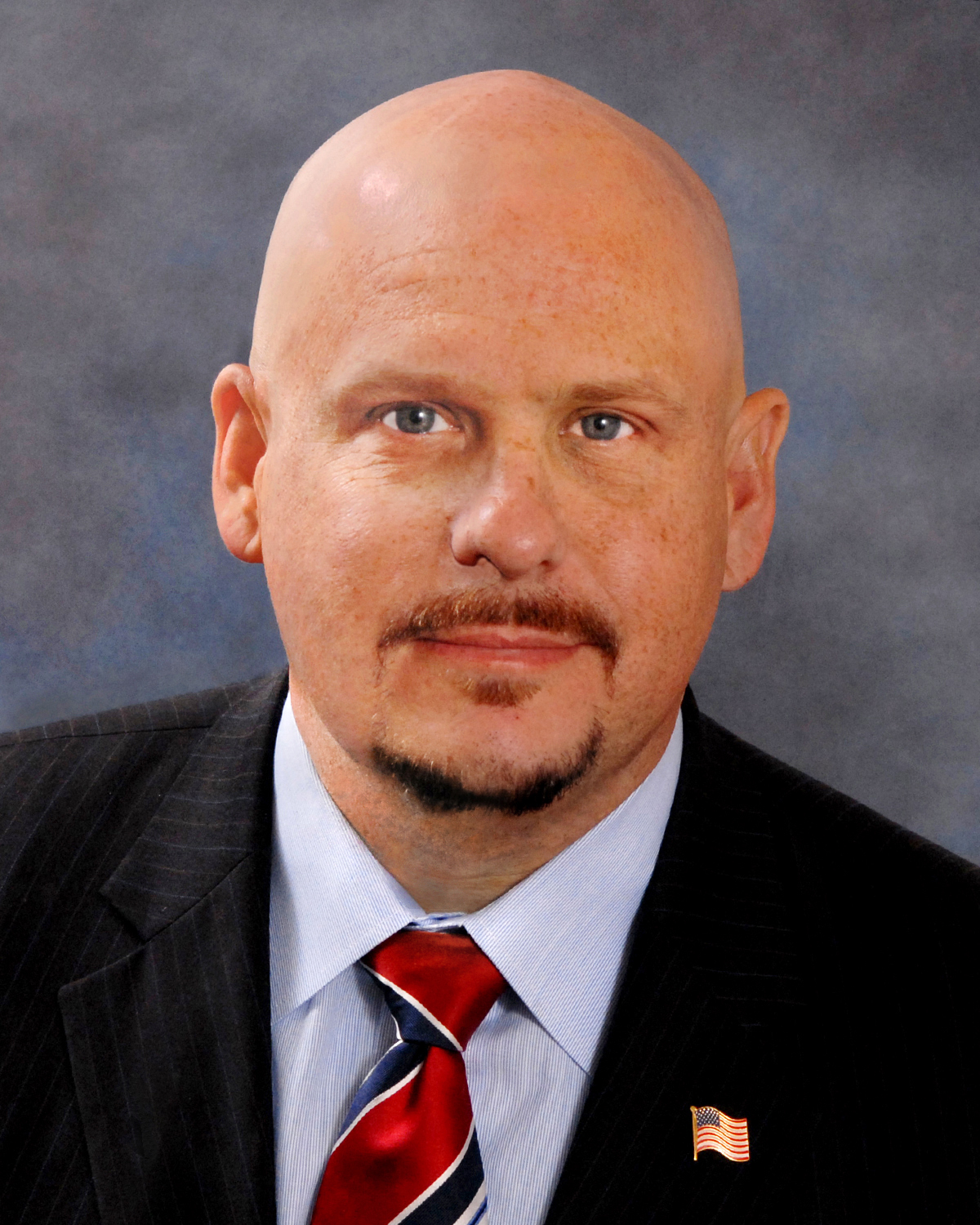

Member of the Florida House of Representatives from the 52nd district
- In office November 20, 2012 – November 8, 2016
- Preceded by: Jeff Brandes
- Succeeded by: Thad Altman

Member of the Florida House of Representatives from the 30th district
- In office November 18, 2008 – November 20, 2012
- Preceded by: Thad Altman
- Succeeded by: Karen Castor Dentel

Personal details
- Born: May 3, 1973 (age 53) Belleville, Ontario
- Party: Republican
- Children: Bailey Richard Workman, Sofia Grace Workman
- Education: Appalachian State University (BS)
- Profession: Mortgage broker

Ritch Workman (born May 3, 1973) is a former Republican member of the Florida House of Representatives, who represented the 52nd District, which includes southern Brevard County, stretching from Melbourne to Palm Shores, from 2012 to 2016, and previously representing the 30th District from 2008 to 2012.

== Early life ==
Workman was born in Belleville, Ontario, in 1973. In 1980, his family moved from Canada to the U.S. state of Florida. Workman graduated from Satellite High School in Satellite Beach and then attended Appalachian State University, where he graduated in 1995. Following graduation, he served in the National Guard from 1990 to 2005, including as a Battery Commander in Operation Noble Eagle. When incumbent State Representative Mike Haridopolos was elected to the Florida Senate in a 2003 Special Election, Workman ran to succeed him in the 30th District, which stretched from Rockledge to Palm Bay in southern Brevard County. Workman lost to Thad Altman in the Republican primary, receiving 29% of the vote to Altman's 41%.

== Florida House of Representatives ==
When Altman opted to run for the Florida Senate rather than seek re-election in 2008, Workman ran to succeed him. In the Republican primary, Workman faced Tres Holton, whom he easily defeated, winning 62% of the vote. He faced Amy Tidd, the Democratic nominee, and, following a contentious campaign, narrowly defeated her, winning 54% of the vote to Tidd's 46%. When running for re-election in 2010, Workman once again faced Tidd, and he campaigned on his sponsorship of legislation similar to SB 1070 in Arizona, which would allow police officers to "detain a person who cannot prove their citizenship or legal status." When Tidd responded that she was "still waiting to see his papers," Workman responded, "Is it because I'm white that this is not a racial slur? I'm offended, but she makes my point for me. I'm pro-immigration reform because when someone comes here illegally, it diminishes my struggle." The Orlando Sentinel endorsed Tidd over Workman, criticizing Workman's "dubious priorities," including "aligning himself with a fringe group that rejects federal authority over states, though he sees no contradiction in Florida taking billions of dollars in stimulus money from Washington, D.C." Despite this, Workman managed to expand his margin of victory over Tidd, defeating her in a landslide with 61% of the vote.

In 2012, when the state's legislative districts were reconfigured, Workman was moved into the 52nd District, which included most of the territory that he previously represented in the 30th District. He faced no opposition in the Republican primary or the general election, and won his third term entirely uncontested. Workman was re-elected to his fourth and final term in the House in 2014 without opposition.

== Controversy ==
During the 2011 legislative session, Workman authored several pieces of legislation that would have repealed a number of what he considered to be "inane" laws. The most controversial of the laws he aimed to repeal was a statute banning the practice of "dwarf-tossing," a "competition in which little people are literally turned into human shot puts." Workman asserted, "[Little people] don't need government to decide for them. This is insulting. Their actions aren't endangering anyone else. For every law that's on the books a little piece of your liberty and freedom is lost." He argued that his legislation could help improve the economy, noting, "All that [the ban on dwarf-tossing] does is prevent some dwarfs from getting jobs they would be happy to get. In this economy, or any economy, why would we want to prevent people from getting gainful employment?" Little People of America, an advocacy group for individuals with dwarfism, condemned Workman's legislation, and Jennifer Arnold, one of the stars of The Little Couple, argued against the proposal, saying, "My biggest concern is that we're going backwards. It seems okay today to still make fun of little people. It's not okay to do that for races, religions and other disabled people."

After losing the 2016 primary election for the state senate, Workman was appointed to the Florida Public Service Commission by Republican Governor Rick Scott. However shortly thereafter, Workman was accused by State Senator Lizbeth Benacquisto (R) of making vulgar comments and gestures at a charity event. She asked him to stop, but he persisted. When he refused to stop, others had to intervene. Benacquisto announced she would not schedule Workman for confirmation by the Senate. Workman subsequently contacted Scott and asked to be withdrawn from consideration. Workman apologized to Benacquisto and agreed to step aside from the PCS appointment to keep from becoming a distraction to the Governor.

Florida House of Representatives
Preceded by Thad Altman	Member of the Florida House of Representatives from the 30th district November 18, 2008 – November 20, 2012	Succeeded by Karen Castor Dentel
Preceded by Jeff Brandes	Member of the Florida House of Representatives from the 52nd district November 20, 2012 – November 22, 2016	Succeeded by Thad Altman
