= Matt Hudson =

American politician and businessman

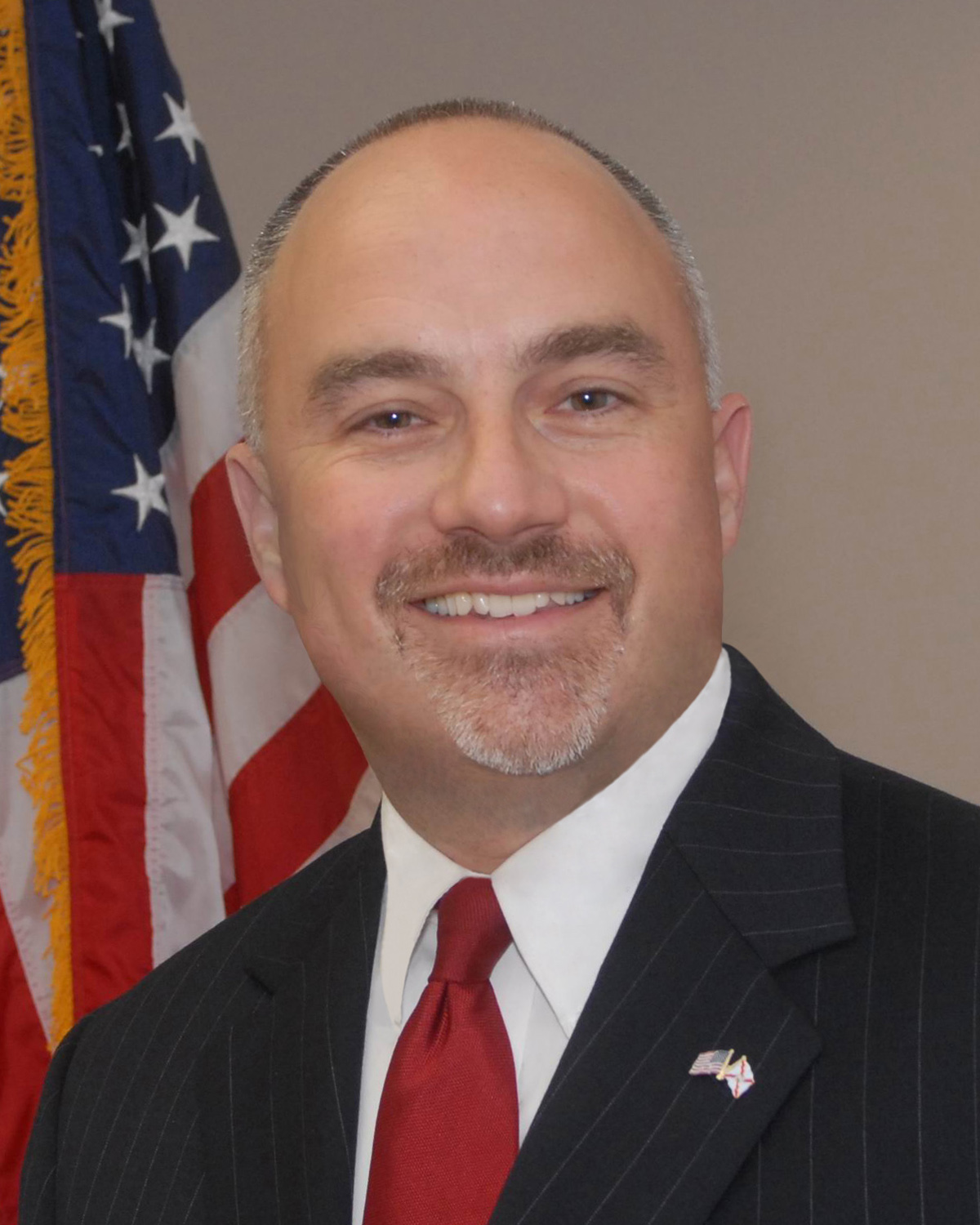

Speaker Pro Tempore of the Florida House of Representatives
- In office November 18, 2014 – November 8, 2016
- Preceded by: Marti Coley
- Succeeded by: Jeanette Nuñez

Member of the Florida House of Representatives
- In office November 20, 2007 – November 8, 2016
- Preceded by: Mike Davis
- Succeeded by: Byron Donalds
- Constituency: 101st District (2007–2012); 80th District (2012–2016)

Personal details
- Born: July 9, 1966 (age 60) Columbus, Ohio
- Party: Republican
- Children: Chris, Kelsey
- Education: Manatee Community College; Edison College; Barry University
- Profession: Realtor

Matt Hudson (born July 9, 1966) is an American politician and businessman who served as a Republican member of the Florida House of Representatives from 2008 to 2012 and again from 2012 to 2016.

== Early life and education ==
Hudson was born in Columbus, Ohio, and moved to Florida in 1977. He attended Manatee Community College from 1984 to 1987, Edison College from 1990 to 1992, and Barry University in 2007.

== Career ==
Prior to his career in politics, Hudson worked as a realtor, eventually becoming the vice-president of Operations at the VIP Realty Group. In 2002, Hudson was elected to the Golden Gate Fire Commission, defeating Allen Butcher with 57% of the vote. He was re-elected in 2006 against Kevin Knight and Franklin Scott Berggren, receiving 44% of the vote to Knight's 38% and Berggren's 17%.

=== Florida House of Representatives ===
On September 12, 2007, incumbent State Representative Mike Davis died after battling cancer, causing a special election to be held to replace him in the 101st District, which included parts of western Broward County and northern Collier County, stretching from Naples to Pembroke Pines. In the Republican primary, he faced Eric Zichella, Chris Spencer, and Gerald J. Lefebvre. Florida's New Directions, an organization indirectly affiliated with Hudson, sent out mailers attacking Zichella over his qualifications, declaring that the resume "he's peddling as a candidate for state representative is so inflated, it's about to blow up in his face." Hudson narrowly defeated his opponents in the primary, winning 37% of the vote to Zichella's 33%, Spencer's 28%, and Lefebvre's 2%, and advanced to the general election, where he faced Linda McDonald, the Democratic nominee and a public school teacher in Naples. The Florida Democratic Party targeted the district, urging attendees at their annual convention to contribute to McDonald's campaign and featuring her as a speaker. During the course of the campaign, Hudson earned the endorsement of the Naples Daily News, which noted, "We have long been impressed by Hudson's immersion in business and civic affairs and youth sports, usually in leadership roles," and questioned whether McDonald was more suited for the school board. In the end, Hudson ended up defeating McDonald, winning 56% of the vote to McDonald's 44%.

Running for re-election in 2008, Hudson was opposed by Maria Jimenez, a charter schools official at the Redlands Christian Migrant Association and the Democratic nominee. The Sun-Sentinel praised Jimenez as an "earnest, knowledgeable candidate" who "would make a good state representative," but ultimately gave their endorsement to Hudson, who they said "made good use of his limited opportunity" in office to sponsor meaningful legislation. Hudson ended up narrowly won re-election over Jimenez, winning 53% of the vote to her 47%. When he ran for re-election in 2010, he faced only independent candidate Larry Wilcoxson, whom he was able to defeat in a landslide with 69% of the vote.

When the state legislative districts were redrawn in 2012, Hudson was moved into the 80th District, which included the territory that he had previously represented in Collier County, but added all of Hendry County and dropped the incursion into Broward County. He won the Republican primary uncontested, and overwhelmingly defeated independent candidate Pam Brown in the general election with 66% of the vote. In 2014, Hudson was re-elected to his final term in the House without opposition.

=== Florida Senate campaign ===
In January 2015, Hudson announced that he would seek the District 28 seat in the Florida Senate in the 2016 elections. Kathleen Passidomo also sought the Republican nomination for that seat. The Republican primary election took place on August 30, 2016.
