= Randy Ball (politician) =

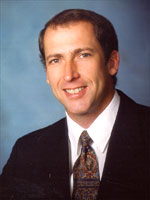

Member of the Florida House of Representatives from the 29th District
- In office November 8, 1994 – November 5, 2002
- Preceded by: Charlie Roberts
- Succeeded by: Ralph Poppell

Personal details
- Born: March 19, 1957 (age 69) Painesville, Ohio, U.S.
- Party: Independent (2011–present); Republican (until 2011)
- Education: United States Naval Academy (B.S.); Liberty Baptist Theological Seminary (M.A.)
- Occupation: Sheriff's deputy/detective

Randy John Ball is a retired law enforcement officer, public policy advisor, and politician who served as a Republican member of the Florida House of Representatives from 1994 to 2002.

== Early life and career ==
Ball was born in Painesville, Ohio, and moved to Florida in 1968. He served in the United States Navy from 1975 to 1977, and then attended the United States Naval Academy, receiving his bachelor's degree in oceanography in 1981 Ball then served in the United States Marines as an officer from 1981 to 1986. He attended the Liberty Baptist Theological Seminary, and initially planned on becoming a preacher, but ultimately returned to Florida and joined the county sheriff's office, where he served as a patrol deputy and homicide detective.

== Florida House of Representatives ==
In 1994, Democratic State Representative Charlie Roberts announced that he would not seek re-election, and Ball ran to succeed him in the 29th District. He faced Canaveral Port Commissioner Jerry Allender in the Republican primary, and ultimately won the nomination with 55 percent of the vote. In the general election, Ball was challenged by attorney Steve Brewer, the Democratic nominee. Ball ultimately defeated Brewer, winning his first term in the legislature with 54 percent of the vote.

In 1996, Ball ran for re-election and was opposed by former Titusville City Councilwoman Joanne Schmidt, who switched from the Republican Party as she challenged Ball. Ball defeated Schmidt by a wide margin, winning 58 percent of the vote to her 42 percent.

Ball was unopposed for re-election in 1998 and 2000. He was term-limited in 2002 and could not seek re-election.

== Post-legislative career ==
Ball served as a public safety policy advisor to Governor Charlie Crist after leaving office. Following the election of Governor Rick Scott in 2010, Ball advised Scott's advisors against cutting $1 billion from the prison budget, and was subsequently asked to resign. Shortly after leaving state government, Ball authored an editorial announcing that he was leaving the Republican Party, criticizing the party's "[m]ilitant partisanship" and "seismic shift in how we view and treat humans."
