= Charlie Sembler =

American politician (born 1965)

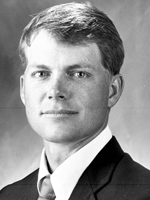

Indian River County Tax Collector
- In office January 1, 2001 – January 5, 2009
- Preceded by: Karl Zimmerman
- Succeeded by: Carole Jordan

Member of the Florida House of Representatives
- In office November 6, 1990 – November 7, 2000
- Preceded by: Dale Patchett (redistricting)
- Succeeded by: Stan Mayfield
- Constituency: 78th District (1990–1992); 80th District (1992–2000)

Personal details
- Born: March 26, 1965 (age 61) Orlando, Florida, U.S.
- Party: Republican
- Children: Charles W. III
- Relatives: Byron B. Harlan (great-grandfather)

Charles W. "Charlie" Sembler II (born March 26, 1965) is a Republican politician and businessman who served as a member of the Florida House of Representatives from 1990 to 2000, and as Indian River County Tax Collector from 2001 to 2009.

== Early life and career ==
Sembler was born in Orlando, Florida, and worked for his family's seafood and nursery business. In 1987, Governor Bob Martinez appointed Sembler to a vacant seat on the Sebastian Inlet Tax District Commission, and he was re-elected unopposed in 1988.

== Florida House of Representatives ==
In 1990, Republican State Representative Dale Patchett declined to seek re-election, and Sembler ran to succeed him in the 78th district, which included parts of Brevard, Indian River, and St. Lucie counties, and resigned from the Tax District Commission. He faced six candidates in the Republican primary: Vero Beach City Councilwoman Molly Beard, businessmen Zack Fulmer and Charlie Wilson, anti-abortion activist Caroline Ginn, insurance agent Tim Keegan, and businessman Allen Miller. Sembler placed first in the primary with 29 percent of the vote, but because no candidate received a majority, he proceeded to a runoff election with Ginn, who placed second with 24 percent of the vote. In the runoff election, Sembler narrowly defeated Ginn, receiving 53 percent of the vote to her 47 percent. He advanced to the general election, where he faced Democratic nominee Richard Graves, a citrus businessman and former member of the Florida Citrus Commission. Though Graves outspent Sembler, Sembler defeated him by a wide margin, winning 55 percent of the vote.

Following the reconfiguration of Florida's legislative districts after the 1990 Census, Sembler ran for re-election in the 80th district, which included eastern Indian River County and Fort Pierce in St. Lucie County. He was the only candidate to file and was re-elected unopposed.

Sembler was re-elected without opposition in 1994, 1996, and 1998. In 2000, Sembler faced term limits and could not run for re-election to a sixth term.

== Indian River County Tax Collector ==
In 2000, facing term limits, Sembler announced that he would run for Indian River County Tax Collector to succeed retiring Tax Collector Karl Zimmerman. No other candidates filed to run against him, and Sembler was elected unopposed. During Sembler's first term, he sold tax certificates to investors and pursued delinquent taxpayers to pay off the $5 million owed in 2004 back taxes. Sembler ran for re-election in 2004 and won unopposed. He declined to seek a third term in 2008, citing a need to return to his family's commercial fishing and nursery business.
