= Jacksonville Housing Authority =

Public housing agency in Jacksonville, Florida

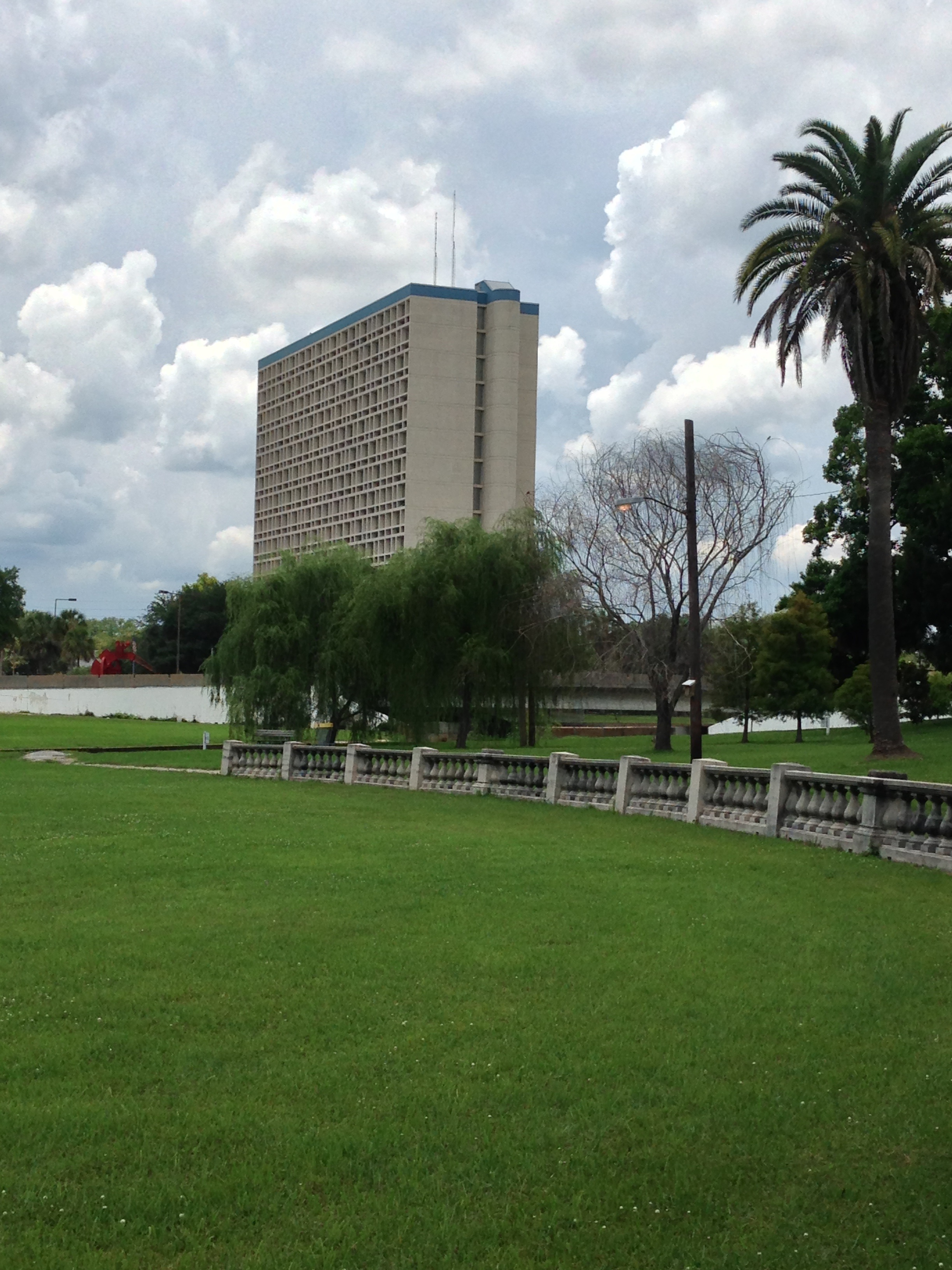
Jacksonville Housing Authority unit overlooking Klutho Park

The Jacksonville Housing Authority (JHA) is the quasi-independent agency responsible for public housing and subsidized housing in the city of Jacksonville, Florida.

Until 1994, a city department had direct responsibility for public housing and Section 8 (housing). The Mayor and City Council of Jacksonville established the Jacksonville Housing Authority to create an effective, community-service–oriented, public housing agency with innovative ideas and a different attitude. The primary goal was to provide safe, clean, affordable housing for eligible low and moderate income families, the elderly, and persons with disabilities. The secondary goal is to provide effective social services, work with residents to improve their quality of life, encourage employment and self-sufficiency, and help residents move out of assisted housing. To that end, JHA works with HabiJax to help low and moderate income families to escape the public housing cycle and become successful, productive, homeowners and taxpayers.

== See also ==
- Brevard Family of Housing
