= Brevard Family of Housing =

US not-for-profit housing authority based in Florida

- Company type: Non-Profit
- Industry: Affordable housing
- Founded: 2008 (Florida)
- Headquarters: Cocoa, Florida
- Area served: Florida
- Key people: Mike Bean
- Products: Affordable housing
- Website: http://www.brfamha.org

Brevard Family of Housing is a US not-for-profit housing authority founded in 2008, as an umbrella organization for the Cocoa Housing Authority, Melbourne Housing Authority, and the Brevard County Housing Authority. It creates and oversees rental housing intended to be permanent and affordable for county residents. It is headquartered in Brevard County, Florida. It is the quasi-independent agency responsible for public housing and subsidized housing in Brevard County, Florida.

== Organization ==
There are three separate boards for each of the housing authorities plus a board of directors for the Family of Housing. In 2010, the Cocoa Housing Authority was intending to separate and operate independently of the Family.

There are 596 units in north, central and south county under the direction of the Brevard Housing Authority. There were 150 units operated by the Melbourne Housing Authority. 356 properties were operated by the Cocoa Housing Authority. 4,500 residents total were living in these Family-managed units. The annual operating budget was about $20 million, mostly from federal funding.

The Cocoa controls 149 federal section 8 rental vouchers. Its operating budget is $3.2 million.

Key people include:

- Chief Executive Officer - Mike Bean.

== History ==
In 2006, financing created by the organization was featured in a case study at a regional symposium in Atlanta.

Until 2009, there were three separate local entities for public housing and Section 8 housing in the county. The Brevard Family of Housing was established as an umbrella organization to create an effective, community-service–oriented, public housing agency with innovative ideas and a different attitude. The primary goal was to provide safe, clean, affordable housing for eligible low and moderate income families, the elderly, and persons with disabilities. The secondary goal was to provide effective social services, work with residents to improve their quality of life, encourage employment and self-sufficiency, and help residents move out of assisted housing.

In 2007, the city of Melbourne voted "no confidence" in the Housing Authority as then constituted for failing to deal with local issues of public housing.

In 2009, the prior Executive Officer was allowed to resign when authorities discovered that he had comingled US federal funds designed for Section 8 housing with local funds and used federal money for local expenditures.

In 2010, a federal court convicted a former employee for accepting a bribe to influence contract selection. An employee of the contracting company was also convicted of bribery and sentenced to jail.

The U.S. Department of Housing and Urban Development took control of the Cocoa Housing Authority in 2013 when it defaulted on a contract with the federal government.

== See also ==
- Jacksonville Housing Authority
