= Stan Mayfield =

American politician

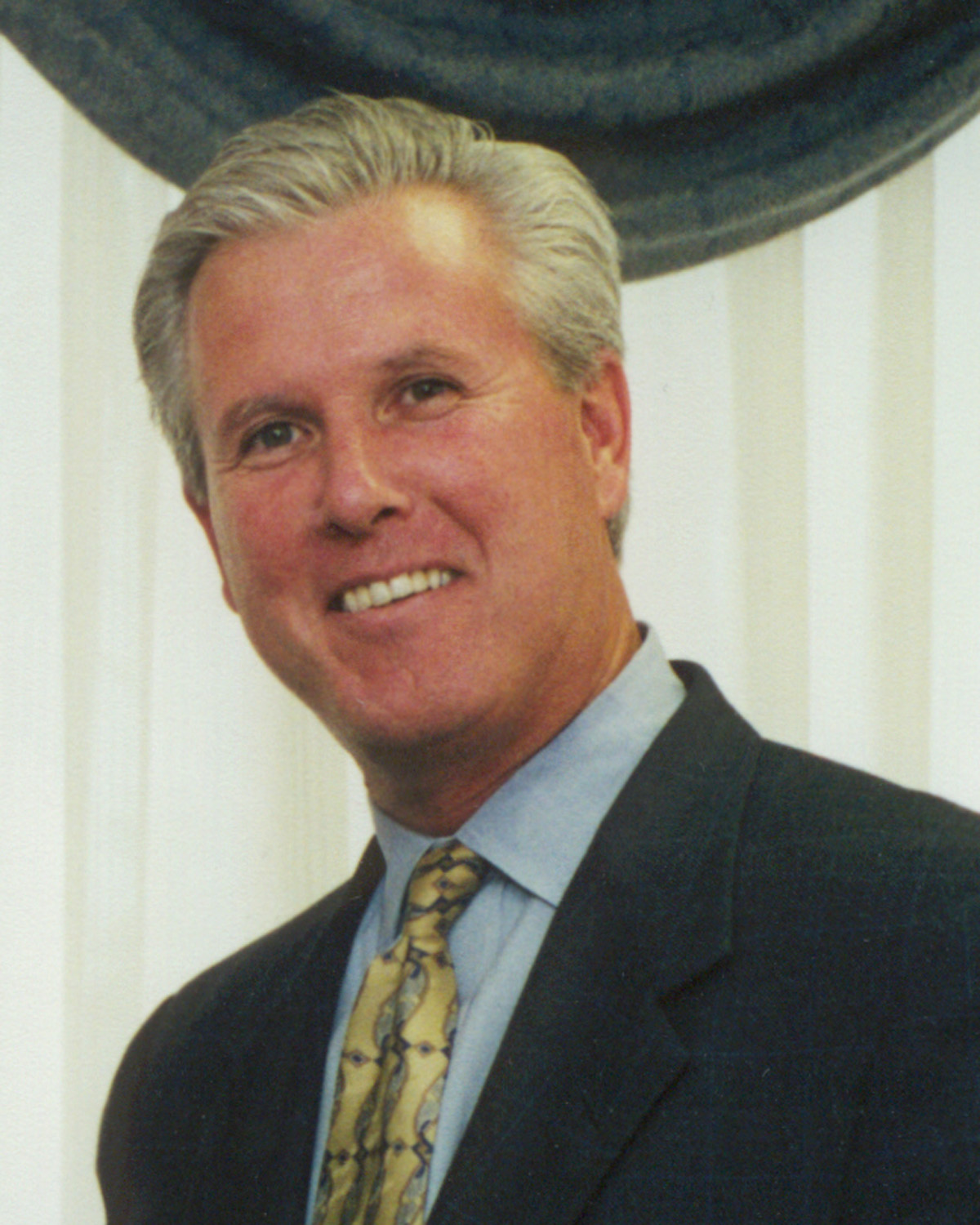

Tax collector-elect of Indian River County
- Elected posthumously

Member of the Florida House of Representatives from the 80th district
- In office November 7, 2000 – September 30, 2008
- Preceded by: Charlie Sembler
- Succeeded by: Debbie Mayfield

Personal details
- Born: November 12, 1955 Pensacola, Florida
- Died: September 30, 2008 (aged 52) Vero Beach, Florida
- Party: Republican
- Spouse: Deborah Minton (m. 1976)
- Education: University of Florida (BS)
- Profession: Engineer

Stan Mayfield (November 12, 1955 – September 30, 2008) was an American politician who served in the Florida House of Representatives of the U.S. state of Florida. He received his bachelor's degree in Civil Engineering from the University of Florida in 1987.

Mayfield lived in Vero Beach, Florida with his family. He died September 30, 2008, in Vero Beach, Fl at the age of 52, after a long battle with cancer. His wife, Debbie, succeeded him as the District 80 representative.
