= Florida's 32nd House of Representatives district =

American legislative district in Florida

Florida's 32nd State House of Representatives district
Representative
Brian Hodgers; R–Melbourne

Florida's 32nd House of Representatives district elects one member of the Florida House of Representatives. It covers parts of Brevard County.

== Members ==
- Thad Altman (2022–2024)
- Debbie Mayfield (2024–2025)
- Brian Hodgers (since 2025)
