= Florida's 80th House of Representatives district =

Florida district

Florida's 80th State House of Representatives district
Representative
Adam Botana; R–Bonita Springs

Florida's 80th House of Representatives district elects one member of the Florida House of Representatives. It contains parts of Collier County and Lee County.

== Members ==
- Charlie Sembler (1992–2000)
- Stan Mayfield (2000–2008)
- Debbie Mayfield (2008–2012)
- Matt Hudson (2012-2016)
- Byron Donalds (2016-2020)
- Lauren Melo (2020–2022)
- Adam Botana (since 2022)
