= Tom Goodson =

American politician

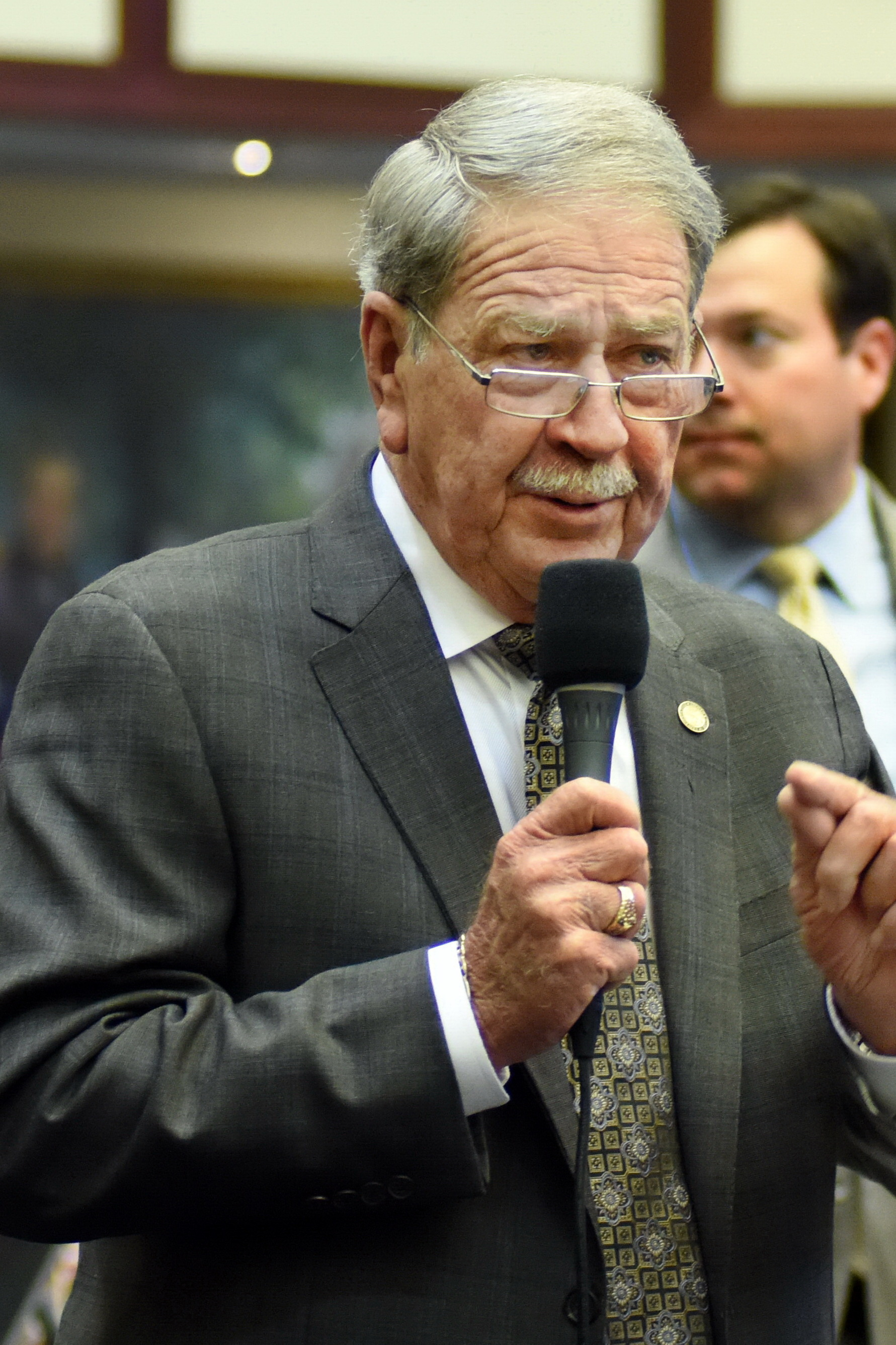

Member of the Florida House of Representatives
- In office November 2, 2010 – November 6, 2018
- Preceded by: Ralph Poppell
- Succeeded by: Tyler Sirois
- Constituency: 29th district (2010–2012); 50th district (2012–2016); 51st district (2016–2018)

Personal details
- Born: February 16, 1951 (age 75) Marianna, Florida
- Party: Republican
- Spouse: Evelyn Watson
- Children: Travis, Lindsey
- Education: Brevard Community College (A.A.); Florida State University (B.S.)
- Profession: Contractor

Tom Goodson (born February 16, 1951) is a Republican politician and a former member of the Florida House of Representatives.

== History ==
Goodson attended Brevard Community College, graduating with his Associate degree in 1973, and later attended Florida State University, graduating with a Bachelor's degree in 1975. In 1988, he founded Goodson Paving, which continues to operate. Goodson was elected to the Canaveral Port Authority in 2002, defeating Don Molitor with 51% of the vote. He was re-elected unopposed in 2006. He currently serves as a member of the Brevard County Commission, District 2.

== Florida House of Representatives ==
In 2010, when incumbent State Representative Ralph Poppell could not seek re-election due to term limits, Goodson ran to succeed him in the 29th District, which included Brevard County and Indian River County. In the Republican primary, he narrowly defeated Erin Grall, J. Roger Shealy, and Bob Dale, winning 31% of the vote and defeating Grall, the second-place finisher, by only 280 votes. He was unopposed in the general election.

When Florida House districts were reconfigured in 2012, Goodson opted to run in the newly created 50th District, which included the territory that he had previously represented in the 29th District, but dropped the Indian River County sections in favor of Orange County sections. He was opposed by Sean Ashby, the Democratic nominee and a high school teacher. Goodson campaigned on working for "fewer regulations and easier permitting to help businesses." The Orlando Sentinel endorsed Ashby over Goodson, noting that Ashby "strikes a much better balance than Goodson between making Florida more business friendly and other priorities, including adequately funding education, protecting the environment, and safeguarding workers' rights." In the end, he won 53% of the vote and narrowly defeated Ashby by 4,000 votes to win a second term. Goodson was opposed in the Republican primary in 2014 by George Collins, and because no other candidates filed, the election was decided in an open primary, which Goodson won handily, winning his third term in the legislature.

While serving in the legislature Goodson was repeatedly accused of not living in his House District, a violation of Florida Law.

== See also ==
- Florida House of Representatives
