= Gag order =

Legal order to restrict publication

A gag order (also known as a gagging order or suppression order) is an order, typically a legal order by a court or government, restricting information or comment from being made public or passed on to any unauthorized third party. The phrase may sometimes be used of a private order by an employer or other institution.

Uses of gag orders include keeping trade secrets of a company, protecting the integrity of ongoing police or military operations, and protecting the privacy of victims or minors. Conversely, as their downside, they may be abused as a useful tool for those of financial means to intimidate witnesses and prevent release of information, using the legal system rather than other methods of intimidation. Strategic lawsuit against public participation (SLAPP) orders may potentially be abused in this way.

Gag orders are sometimes used in an attempt to assure a fair trial by preventing prejudicial pre-trial publicity, although their use for this purpose is controversial since they are a potentially unconstitutional prior restraint that can lead to the press's using less reliable sources such as off-the-record statements and second- or third-hand accounts.

In a similar manner, a "gag law" may limit freedom of the press, by instituting censorship or restricting access to information.

== Examples ==
=== Australia ===
In the summer of 2014, WikiLeaks revealed the existence of an Australia-wide gagging order, issued 19 June by the Supreme Court of Victoria, to block reporting of bribery allegations involving several international political leaders in the region.

In December 2018, International news sources have reported that Cardinal George Pell's conviction on child-molestation charges is subject to a gag order issued by Victoria, Australia court Judge Peter Kidd, suppressing coverage of the conviction by Australian media companies. In early February 2019, Victoria's DPP, Kerri Judd QC, wrote to around 50 Australian news publishers, editors, broadcasters, reporters and subeditors, accusing them of breaking the gag order. Kidd told a closed court that some of the breaches were serious and editors faced jail.

=== Brazil ===
In 2019, the Brazilian Ministry of Environment imposed a gag order on environmental enforcement agency Ibama, ordering it not to respond to press inquiries and to instead redirect them to the ministry's communications office. Ibama's head of communications was forced to resign after weeks of defying the ministry's directive to reroute press queries.

=== India ===
After the 2008 Mumbai attacks in which live streaming of the event was broadcast, the Indian government proposed a draft law that would gag media outlets broadcasting live pictures during a terrorist event or war, to ensure the safety of any hostages and to protect security operations from hindrance. This has been opposed by Indian media who argue that they have adopted 'self-regulation' during such events and refrain from doing so anyway. It is uncertain if the draft law will be passed.

=== Israel ===
In late 2009, Israel issued a gag order against the Israeli media reporting on facts surrounding the Anat Kamm–Uri Blau affair. The gag order was ultimately subject to widespread criticism and publicity as the details of the case were reported overseas. The scandal centered around leaked documents from the Israeli Defense Force which suggested the military had engaged in extrajudicial killings.

A gag order concerning the Prisoner X affair prevented Israeli coverage of the topic for more than two years. After numerous foreign media outlets revealed the prisoner's identity and other key facts in February 2013, a court partially lifted the gag order, allowing Israeli media to quote foreign press reports but offer no original reporting.

On 13 November 2013 a gag order concerning a famous Israeli singer suspected of sex with girls below the age of consent was issued. While the traditional media did not advertise the name of the singer, social media platforms users like Facebook published the singer name and incriminating photos. On 20 November Eyal Golan released a press statement announcing he was the suspected singer.

In 2014, a blanket gag order regarding the detainment of Avera Mengitsu was put into place. It lasted 10 months, until July 9, 2015. Discussions took place in social media forums and some reports were published on foreign websites. Some clues about the affair were leaked to different Arabic media outlets, from which the story made its way to international media and was published to Tikun Olam by blogger Richard Silverstein. The gag order was lifted following a request from Haaretz. The Associated Press speculated that a statement made by Khaled Mashal the previous day, in which he spoke of an Israeli request through a European intermediary for the release of "two soldiers and two bodies", may have "forced Israel's hand".

In August 2017, an Israeli court issued a month-long gag order on a state witness deal regarding the ongoing criminal investigations of Prime Minister Benjamin Netanyahu.

=== Malaysia ===
There was speculation that a gag order may be imposed by the MCA on their press statements before they are released to the public to "ensure maximum effectiveness". Such releases would have to be approved by the president. These claims in the media were later denied.

=== Myanmar ===
In October 2021, the top attorney for Myanmar's deposed leader Aung San Suu Kyi claimed that Burmese authorities had issued him a gag order barring him from discussing Aung San Suu Kyi's court proceedings in public because they believed such communications could spark unrest.

=== New Zealand ===
In New Zealand, name suppression is the commonly used term for a court order preventing the publication of a name or details of a criminal case. The rules for name suppression are laid out in the Criminal Procedure Act 2011. Name suppression can be granted automatically for several reasons, including to protect the identities of victims of sex crimes or to protect the identity of children under the age of 17. Name suppression can also be granted at the discretion of the court. Defendants frequently receive name suppression in New Zealand. Often this is due to the court determining that media coverage could cause undue hardship to a defendant, or could prejudice the defendant's right to a fair trial. Name suppression orders can be (and frequently are) opposed, often by media outlets. Victims of crime can waive their automatic name suppression rights, in order to lift name suppression on the defendant, though this is uncommon. In theory, a defendant being well-known is not in-and-of-itself grounds for name suppression, though in practice many well-known people are granted name suppression when charged with a crime.

Breaching a name suppression order brings a penalty of up to 6 months in prison for individuals, or fines of up to NZ$100,000 for organisations.

Some high-profile cases have seen breaches of name suppression orders in New Zealand. In 2010, right-wing blogger and vocal critic of name suppression rules Cameron Slater was convicted of breaching name suppression orders and fined NZ$8,000. Later, Slater himself benefited from name suppression when charged with attempting to hack a competing political website.

The defendant in the murder of Grace Millane was granted name suppression during trial, but media outlets covering the case in the United Kingdom published his name, as they were not subject to New Zealand law. This resulted in his name being commonly available online in New Zealand, including being emailed to Google News subscribers within New Zealand. Auckland businessman Leo Molloy was convicted of breaching name suppression in the case when he posted the defendant's name on a web forum. He was fined NZ$15,000 and sentenced to 350 hours of community service.

In August 2023 Te Pāti Māori co-leader Rawiri Waititi made a direct reference to a child abuse case involving former ACT party president Tim Jago in parliament. Despite details of the case being suppressed from publication by the courts, Waititi's speech was protected by parliamentary privilege. He was later suspended from parliament for breaching standing orders.

Name suppression orders can be quite broad. In 2025, former deputy New Zealand Police commissioner Jevon McSkimming was charged with possession of child sexual exploitation and bestiality material. Prior to being charged, McSkimming was granted a "super-injunction", that prevented the media reporting the nature of the material that had been discovered on his work devices, and also prevented reporting about the existence of the injunction itself. Before he was arrested, he was again granted a suppression order that prevented media reporting that he had been arrested, or the nature of the crimes he was accused of. Suppression lapsed before trial, and his identity was revealed.

Name suppression laws in New Zealand have been controversial since they were first introduced in the early 20th century, and specific suppression orders are also sometimes highly controversial. Critics point to the legislation being used to protect the identities of well-known figures when they are accused of crime, and that suppressing details from publication conflicts with the principle of open justice. The internet has introduced new challenges with the enforcement of name suppression orders. The New Zealand Bar Association has defended name suppression laws as an important tool for balancing the principles of open justice against fair trial rights.

In 2025, a law change was proposed that would allow the victims of sex crimes to have final say over whether a convicted perpetrator would receive permanent name suppression.

=== Nigeria ===
In July 2021, the National Broadcasting Commission issued a gag order barring all journalists and broadcast stations in the country from reporting details of terrorists, kidnappers, and victims. After unsuccessfully calling for the gag order's withdrawal, the Socio-Economic Rights and Accountability Project (SERAP) and the Centre for Journalism Innovation and Development (PTCIJ) filed a lawsuit against President Muhammadu Buhari and Minister of Information and Culture Lai Mohammed, with National Broadcasting Commission also named as a defendant. The plaintiffs asked the court to “declare illegal the gag order" and to compel the defendants to withdraw the directive, arguing that it was "inconsistent and incompatible with sections 22 and 39 of the Nigerian Constitution, Article 9 of the African Charter on Human and Peoples’ Rights and Article 19 of the International Covenant on Civil and Political Rights".

=== The Netherlands ===
In The Netherlands, ethologist Gerrit van Putten was given two separate gag orders by the Minister of Agriculture to protect intensive farming. The first gag order was issued after Van Putten had published a report on tail biting in pigs in 1972, and had advocated that the pig's tail is a thermometer of animal welfare, which was discarded when the "temperature" became too high, i.e. the tails were docked rather than that housing conditions were improved. The second gag order was issued in 1989 by Minister Braks, who did not want to hear about the adverse effects of confined housing of pigs.

In 2015, a Dutch court issued a gag order on writer Edwin Giltay, banning his non-fiction thriller The Cover-up General and prohibiting him to promote it. The suppression order denied Edwin Giltay to disclose the contents of the book, which delineates an espionage scandal within Dutch military intelligence that he witnessed first-hand, about obscuring evidence of war crimes in Srebrenica. In 2016, the Court of Appeal in The Hague revoked the gag order and the book ban.

=== United Kingdom ===
A gag order, or anonymity order, is sometimes issued by courts in the United Kingdom to protect privacy, prevent harm to suspects, prisoners, witnesses, victims, or to protect national security. In the Allan Chappelow murder case, the trial was held mostly in camera and media were prevented from speculating on the case. The order was imposed after a "compelling case" made by prosecutors, despite overwhelming media opposition brought by a legal challenge to the ruling. This criminal case has been thought to be the first in which a gagging order was imposed.

In 2011 super-injunctions in English law, gagging orders that applied to themselves, were being referred to almost daily in the United Kingdom after a number of high-profile public figures, including celebrities and politicians, censored the British media from revealing information about their personal lives, such as affairs and dealings with prostitutes.

Gag orders protecting the privacy of convicted child murderers such as Mary Bell, Jon Venables and David McGreavy, in order to protect them from revenge attacks, have also been controversial because of public concerns about the inability to avoid such persons and protect victims' families and other children from being harmed by them.

=== United States ===
A national security letter (18 U.S.C. § 2709), an administrative subpoena used by the FBI, has an attached gag order which restricts the recipient from ever saying anything about being served with one. The government has issued hundreds of thousands of such NSLs accompanied with gag orders. The gag orders have been upheld in court.

Suspicious activity reports (31 U.S.C. § 5318(g)(2); the Housing and Community Development Act of 1992 / Annunzio-Wylie Anti-Money Laundering Act, Pub. L. 102–550, § 1517(b), 106 Stat. 4060) require that "If a financial institution or any director, officer, employee, or agent of any financial institution [...] reports a suspicious transaction to a government agency—neither the financial institution, director, officer, employee, or agent of such institution (whether or not any such person is still employed by the institution) [...] may notify any person involved in the transaction that the transaction has been reported; and no current or former officer or employee of or contractor for the Federal Government or of or for any State, local, tribal, or territorial government within the United States, who has any knowledge that such report was made may disclose to any person involved in the transaction that the transaction has been reported".

18 U.S.C. § 2705(b) (the Electronic Communications Privacy Act of 1986 / Stored Communications Act) also provides for gag orders which direct the recipient of a 18 U.S.C. § 2703(d) order to refrain from disclosing the existence of the order or the investigation.

18 U.S.C. § 3123(d)(2) (the Electronic Communications Privacy Act of 1986) also provides for gag orders which direct the recipient of a pen register or trap and trace device order not to disclose the existence of the pen/trap or the investigation.

In the United States, a court can order parties to a case not to comment on it but has no authority to stop unrelated reporters from reporting on a case. Thus, information concerning a case is often leaked to the media, and the media often chooses to publicly report this leaked information after receiving it. Most statutes which restrict what may be reported have generally been found unconstitutional and void. However, the gag provisions of the WIPO Copyright and Performances and Phonograms Treaties Implementation Act have been upheld.

The trials of Guantanamo Bay suspects have also been subjected to a gag order, which has hindered public scrutiny. Likewise, as part of a plea bargain, John Walker Lindh consented to a gag order to not talk to the press or others. Also, Judge Howard Shore from San Diego put a gag order on activist Jeff Olson.

Gag orders can be part of a settlement agreement between two parties. In the state of Pennsylvania in 2011, a lifetime gag order on the discussion of fracking was agreed to by a family as part of their agreement with the oil and gas drilling company Range Resources. An attorney for Range Resources claimed in court that the gag order covered not only the adults in the family, but also the children, then aged seven and ten years old, and that the company intended to enforce it. (Note: After court records were unsealed and the settlement was reported in the press, the chief counsel for Range Resources denied that the gag order applied to the children. In a letter to the family's attorney, he wrote, "Range has never, at any time, had the intention of seeking to hold a minor child legally accountable for a breach of that provision of the settlement agreement.")

Some U.S. states, the first of which was Florida, have enacted so-called "physician gag laws" limiting doctors' ability to ask about a patient's gun ownership.

==== California ====
In 2017, California enacted the California Electronic Communications Privacy Act, adjusting California Penal Code 1546, including Section 1546.2 (b) (1), a provision which allows that in certain cases, a court can issue "an order delaying notification and prohibiting any party providing information from notifying any other party" that an electronic search warrant has been requested by a government entity.

==== Puerto Rico ====
On 21 May 1948, a bill was introduced before the Puerto Rican Senate which would restrain the rights of the independence and Nationalist movements on the archipelago, which was a colony of the United States at the time. The Senate, controlled by the Partido Popular Democrático (PPD), approved the bill that day. This bill, which resembled the anti-communist Smith Act passed in the United States in 1940, became known as the Ley de la Mordaza (Gag Law, technically "Law 53 of 1948") when the U.S.-appointed governor of Puerto Rico, Jesús T. Piñero, signed it into law on 10 June 1948.

Under this new law it became a crime to print, publish, sell, or exhibit any material intended to paralyze or destroy the insular government; or to organize any society, group or assembly of people with a similar destructive intent. It made it illegal to sing a patriotic song, and reinforced the 1898 law that had made it illegal to display the Flag of Puerto Rico, with anyone found guilty of disobeying the law in any way being subject to a sentence of up to ten years imprisonment, a fine of up to US$10,000 (equivalent to $134,000 in 2025), or both. According to Leopoldo Figueroa, the lone non-PPD member of the Puerto Rico House of Representatives, Law 53 was repressive and was in violation of the First Amendment of the US Constitution which guarantees Freedom of Speech. He pointed out that the law as such was a violation of the civil rights of the people of Puerto Rico.

=== Venezuela ===
The Inter-American Commission on Human Rights and the Inter-American Press Association (IAPA), as well as the Venezuelan opposition, have considered the Law on Social Responsibility on Radio and Television as a gag law that violates freedom of the press and the exercise of journalism in Venezuela.

== See also ==
- Ag-gag
- Compromise agreement
- DA-Notice
- Editorial independence
- Filibuster
- Franchise fraud
- Freedom of speech
- Gag rule
- Injunction
- Media blackout
- Media transparency
- Never say anything
- Non-disclosure agreement
- Prior restraint
- Publication ban
- Public Interest Immunity
- Rivercrabbing
- Super-injunction
- Temporary restraining order
- Whistleblower
