= Rick Scott =

American politician (born 1952)

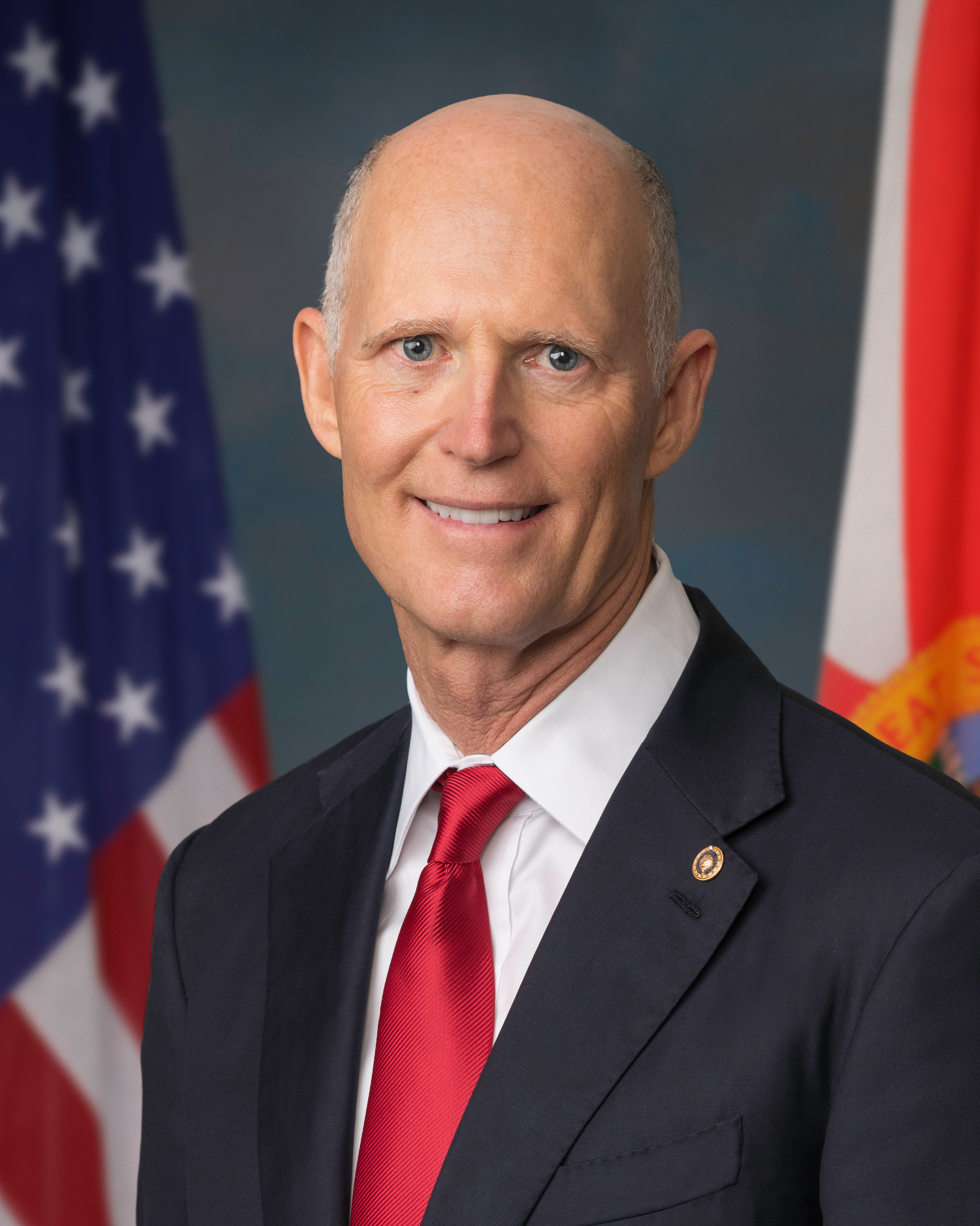
- Official portrait, 2019

Chair of the Senate Aging Committee
- Incumbent
- Assumed office January 3, 2025
- Preceded by: Bob Casey Jr.

Chair of the National Republican Senatorial Committee
- In office January 3, 2021 – January 3, 2023
- Leader: Mitch McConnell
- Preceded by: Todd Young
- Succeeded by: Steve Daines

United States Senator from Florida
- Incumbent
- Assumed office January 8, 2019 Serving with Ashley Moody
- Preceded by: Bill Nelson

45th Governor of Florida
- In office January 4, 2011 – January 7, 2019
- Lieutenant: Jennifer Carroll; Carlos Lopez-Cantera
- Preceded by: Charlie Crist
- Succeeded by: Ron DeSantis

Personal details
- Born: Richard Lynn Myers; December 1, 1952 (age 73) Bloomington, Illinois, U.S.
- Party: Republican
- Spouse: Ann Holland (m. 1972)
- Children: 2
- Education: University of Missouri–Kansas City (BBA); Southern Methodist University (JD)
- Website: Senate website Campaign website

Military service
- Branch/service: United States Navy
- Years of service: c. 1971–1974
- Rank: Petty officer third class
- Unit: USS Glover (FF-1098)
- Scott's voice Scott opposing student debt relief Recorded September 14, 2022

Richard Lynn Scott (né Myers; born December 1, 1952) is an American attorney, businessman, politician, and Navy veteran serving as the senior United States senator from Florida, a seat he has held since 2019. (Note: Because Ron DeSantis and Jeannette Núñez took their oaths of office ahead of time, they became governor and lieutenant governor at midnight on January 8, rather than waiting for the inaugural ceremony. Thus, Scott's and Lopez-Cantera's terms ended at the end of January 7.) A member of the Republican Party, he served from 2011 to 2019 as the 45th governor of Florida.

Scott is a graduate of the University of Missouri–Kansas City and the Dedman School of Law at Southern Methodist University. In 1987, after serving in the U.S. Navy and becoming a law firm partner, he co-founded Columbia Hospital Corporation. Columbia later merged with another corporation to form Columbia/HCA, which eventually became the nation's largest for-profit health care company. During Scott's tenure as CEO of Columbia/HCA, a federal investigation was launched into allegations of colossal Medicare and Medicaid fraud. Scott resigned from his role as CEO on July 25, 1997, four months after the investigation began. (The DOJ announced in 2003 that it had settled the case against Columbia/HCA for $1.7 billion in damages and penalties—at the time, the largest case of Medicare fraud in US history). After he resigned from Columbia/HCA, Scott gained notoriety for pleading the Fifth Amendment 75 times in depositions. He later became a venture capitalist, and pursued other business interests.

Scott ran for governor of Florida in 2010, defeating Bill McCollum in a vigorously contested Republican primary election and Democratic nominee Alex Sink by just over one point in the general election. Scott was reelected in 2014, again by just over one point, against former governor Charlie Crist. He was barred by term limits from running for reelection in 2018 and instead ran for the U.S. Senate.

Scott won the 2018 U.S. Senate election, defeating incumbent Democrat Bill Nelson in a close election that triggered a mandatory recount. He was reelected in 2024, defeating Democratic nominee Debbie Mucarsel-Powell by over 12 points. He became Florida's senior senator in 2025, when Marco Rubio resigned from the Senate to become Secretary of State.

== Early life and education ==
Rick Scott was born Richard Lynn Myers on December 1, 1952, in Bloomington, Illinois. He never met his biological father, Gordon William Myers, whom Scott's mother, Esther J. Scott, described as an abusive alcoholic. Scott's parents divorced in his infancy.

In 1954, Esther married Orba George Scott Jr., a truck driver. Orba adopted Rick, who took his stepfather's surname and became known as Richard Lynn Scott. Scott was raised in North Kansas City, Missouri, the second of five children. His family was lower-middle-class and struggled financially; Esther Scott worked as a clerk at J. C. Penney, among other jobs.

Scott graduated from North Kansas City High School in 1970. He attended community college for a year and then enlisted in the United States Navy. In 1972, he married Ann Holland, whom he met in high school, at a Baptist church in Kansas City. Scott had completed naval bootcamp just before the wedding. Afterward, he was sent to a naval posting in Newport, Rhode Island, where he and his wife lived for 15 months. He served there as a radarman on the USS Glover (FF-1098), which during his enlistment spent time dry docked in Boston and sailed to ports in Bermuda and Puerto Rico. Scott was in the Navy for 29 months, including training.

After the Navy, Scott and his wife moved to Kansas City, where he attended college on the G.I. Bill. He graduated in 1975 from the University of Missouri–Kansas City with a Bachelor of Business Administration. He earned a Juris Doctor from Southern Methodist University. The Texas Bar licensed him to practice law in 1978.

== Career ==
Scott made his first foray into business while working his way through college and law school, initially buying and reviving a failing doughnut shop (the Flavor Maid Do-Nut) by adding workplace delivery instead of relying on foot traffic. He later bought and revived another doughnut shop. After graduating from law school, Scott worked as an attorney at the law firm of Johnson & Swanson in Dallas, Texas.

=== Columbia Hospital Corporation ===
In 1988, Scott and Richard Rainwater, a financier from Fort Worth, each put up $125,000 in working capital in their new company, Columbia Hospital Corporation; they borrowed the remaining money needed to purchase two struggling hospitals in El Paso for $60 million. Then they acquired a neighboring hospital and shut it down. Within a year, the remaining two were doing much better. By the end of 1989, Columbia Hospital Corporation owned four hospitals with a total of 833 beds.

In 1992, Columbia made a stock purchase of Basic American Medical, which owned eight hospitals, primarily in Southwestern Florida. In September 1993, Columbia did another stock purchase, worth $3.4 billion, of Galen Healthcare, which had been spun off by Humana Inc. several months earlier. At the time, Galen had approximately 90 hospitals. After the purchase, Galen stockholders had 82% of the stock in the combined company, with Scott still running the company.

=== Columbia/HCA ===
In April 1987, Scott made his first attempt to buy the Hospital Corporation of America (HCA). While still a partner at Johnson & Swanson, Scott formed the HCA Acquisition Company with two former executives of Republic Health Corporation, Charles Miller and Richard Ragsdale. With financing from Citicorp conditional on acquisition of HCA, the proposed holding company offered $3.85 billion for 80 million shares at $47 each, intending to assume an additional $1.2 billion in debt, for a total $5 billion deal. After HCA declined the offer, the bid was withdrawn.

In 1994, Columbia Hospital Corporation merged with HCA, "forming the single largest for-profit health care company in the country." Scott became CEO of Columbia/HCA. According to The New York Times, "[in] less than a decade, Mr. Scott had built a company he founded with two small hospitals in El Paso into the world's largest health care company – a $20 billion giant with about 350 hospitals, 550 home health care offices and scores of other medical businesses in 38 states."

==== Fraud investigation and settlement ====
On March 19, 1997, investigators from the Federal Bureau of Investigation, the Internal Revenue Service, and the Department of Health and Human Services served search warrants at Columbia/HCA facilities in El Paso and on dozens of doctors with suspected ties to the company. Eight days after the initial raid, Scott signed his last SEC report as a hospital executive. Four months later, the board of directors pressured him to resign as chairman and CEO. He was succeeded by Thomas F. Frist Jr. Scott was paid $9.88 million in a settlement, and left owning 10 million shares of stock then worth more than $350 million. The directors had been warned in the company's annual public reports to stockholders that incentives Columbia/HCA offered doctors could run afoul of a federal anti-kickback law passed to limit or eliminate instances of conflicts of interest in Medicare and Medicaid.

In 2000, during a deposition for a civil suit unrelated to the fraud investigation, Scott pleaded the Fifth Amendment 75 times. In settlements reached in 2000 and 2002, Columbia/HCA pleaded guilty to 14 felonies and agreed to a $600+ million fine in what was at the time the largest health care fraud settlement in U.S. history. Columbia/HCA admitted systematically overcharging the government by claiming marketing costs as reimbursable, by striking illegal deals with home care agencies, and by filing false data about use of hospital space. It also admitted to fraudulently billing Medicare and other health programs by inflating the seriousness of diagnoses and to giving doctors partnerships in company hospitals as a kickback for the doctors referring patients to HCA. It filed false cost reports, fraudulently billed Medicare for home health care workers, and paid kickbacks in the sale of home health agencies and to doctors to refer patients. In addition, it gave doctors "loans" never intended to be repaid, free rent, free office furniture, and free drugs from hospital pharmacies.

In late 2002, HCA agreed to pay the United States government $631 million, plus interest, and $17.5 million to state Medicaid agencies, in addition to $250 million paid up to that point to resolve outstanding Medicare expense claims. In all, civil lawsuits cost HCA more than $2 billion to settle; at the time, this was the largest fraud settlement in U.S. history.

=== Venture capitalist ===
After leaving Columbia/HCA in 1997, Scott launched Richard L. Scott Investments, based in Naples, Florida (originally in Stamford, Connecticut), which has stakes in health care, manufacturing and technology companies. Between 1998 and 2001, he purchased 50% of CyberGuard Corporation for approximately $10 million. Among his investors was Metro Nashville finance director David Manning.

In 2006, CyberGuard was sold to Secure Computing for more than $300 million. In February 2005, Scott purchased Continental Structural Plastics, Inc. (CSP) in Detroit, Michigan. In July 2006, CSP purchased Budd Plastics from ThyssenKrupp, making CSP the largest industrial composites molder in North America.

In 2005–2006, Scott provided the initial round of funding of $3 million to Alijor.com (named for the first three letters of his two daughters' names), which offered hospitals, physicians, and other health care providers the opportunity to post information about their prices, hours, locations, insurance accepted, and personal backgrounds online. Scott co-founded the company with his daughter Allison.

In 2008, Alijor was sold to HealthGrades. In May 2008, Scott purchased Drives, one of the world's leading independent designers and manufacturers of heavy-duty drive chain-based products and assemblies for industrial and agricultural applications and precision-engineered augers for agricultural, material handling, construction and related applications. Scott reportedly has an interest in a chain of family fun centers/bowling alleys, S&S Family Entertainment, in Kentucky and Tennessee led by Larry Schmittou, a minor league baseball team owner.

=== America's Health Network (AHN) ===
In July 1997, Columbia/HCA Healthcare purchased a controlling interest in America's Health Network (AHN), the first 24-hour health care cable channel. The company pulled out of the deal on the day of the closing because Scott and Vandewater were terminated, causing the immediate layoffs of more than 250 people in Orlando. Later that same year, Scott became majority owner of AHN.

In 1998, Scott and Vandewater led a group of investors who gave AHN a major infusion of cash so that the company could continue to operate. By early 1999, the network was available in 9.5 million American homes.

In mid-1999 AHN merged with Fit TV, a subsidiary of Fox; the combination was renamed The Health Network. Later that year, in a deal between News Corp. and WebMD, the latter received half-ownership of The Health Network. WebMD planned to relaunch The Health Network as WebMD Television in the fall of 2000, with new programming, but that company announced cutbacks and restructuring in September 2000, and, in January 2001, News Corp. regained 100% ownership. In September 2001, Fox Cable Networks Group sold The Health Network to its main rival, the Discovery Health Channel, for $155 million in cash plus a 10% equity stake in Discovery Health.

=== Solantic ===
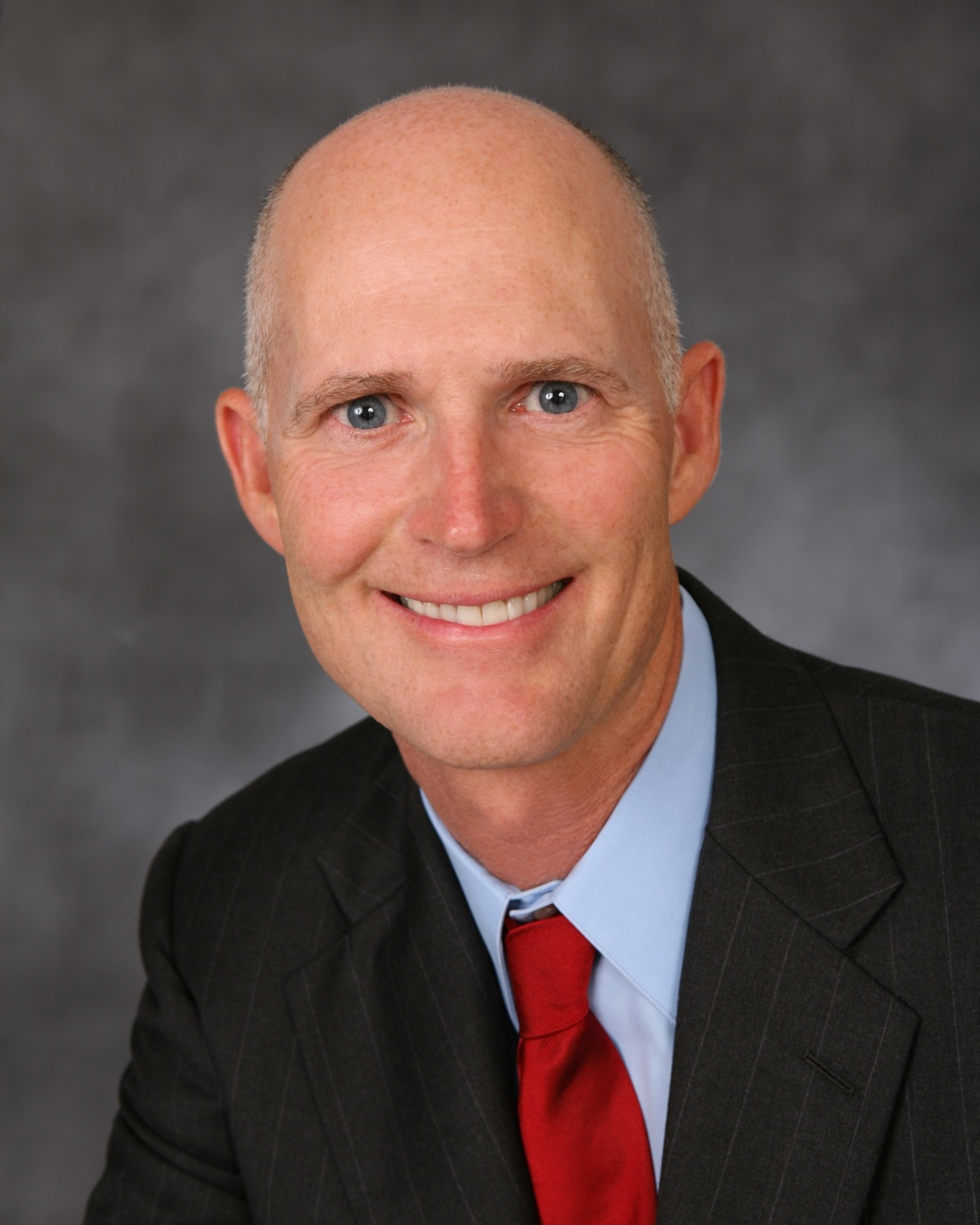
Scott in 2007

Solantic, based in Jacksonville, Florida, was co-founded in 2001 by Scott and Karen Bowling, a former television anchor Scott met after Columbia bought what is now Memorial Hospital in 1995.

Solantic opened its first urgent care center in 2002. It provides urgent care services, immunizations, physicals, drug screening, and care for injured workers. The corporation attracts patients who do not have insurance, cannot get appointments with their primary care physicians, or do not have primary care physicians. Solantic is an alternative to the emergency department care that these types of patients often seek, or to not seeing a doctor at all. In 2006, Scott said that his plans for Solantic were to establish a national brand of medical clinics.

In August 2007, the company received a $40 million investment from a private equity firm and said that it expected to open 35 clinics by the end of 2009, with annual revenues of $100 million once all these clinics were open, compared to $20 million at the time. As of March 2009, Solantic had 24 centers, all in Florida.

Solantic was the target of an employment discrimination suit that claimed that there had been a policy to not hire elderly or obese applicants, preferring "mainstream" candidates. It was settled for an undisclosed sum on May 23, 2007. Scott responded to Salon regarding the claims of discrimination pointing out that "currently 53 percent of Solantic's employees are white, 20 percent black and 17 percent Hispanic."

=== Pharmaca ===
In 2003, Scott invested $5.5 million in Pharmaca Integrative Pharmacies, which operates drugstores/pharmacies in the Western United States that offer vitamins, herbal medicine, skin products, homeopathic medicines, and prescriptions.

=== Other work ===
In the 1990s, Scott was a partner of George W. Bush as co-owner of the Texas Rangers.

== Early political career ==
=== Conservatives for Patients' Rights ===
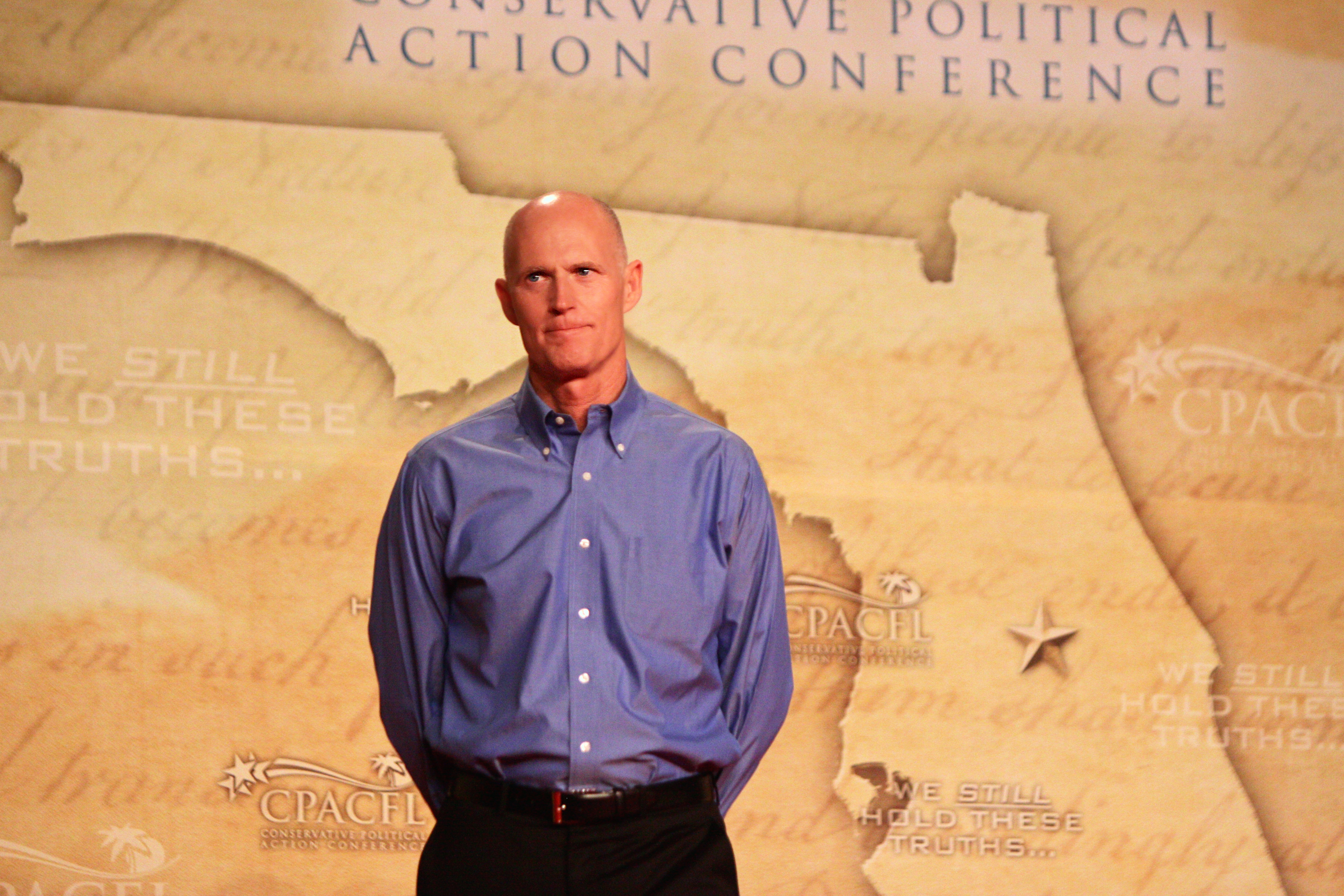
Governor Scott speaking at the 2011 Conservative Political Action Conference (CPAC) in Orlando, Florida

In February 2009, Scott founded Conservatives for Patients' Rights (CPR), which he said was intended to put pressure on Democrats to enact health care legislation based on free-market principles. As of March 2009, he had given about $5 million for a planned $20 million ad campaign by CPR.

== Governor of Florida ==
=== Elections ===
==== 2010 ====
On April 9, 2010, Scott announced his candidacy for the Republican nomination for governor of Florida.

Susie Wiles, former communications chief to Jacksonville Mayor John Peyton, was Scott's campaign manager, and Tony Fabrizio was his chief pollster. It was reported on May 7 that Scott's campaign had already spent $4.7 million on television and radio ads. His first video advertisement was released to YouTube on April 13.

During the primary campaign, Scott's opponent, Bill McCollum, made an issue of Scott's role at Columbia/HCA. Scott countered that the FBI had never targeted him. Marc Caputo of the Miami Herald contended that a 1998 bill McCollum sponsored would have made it more difficult to prosecute Medicare fraud cases, and was counter to his current views and allegations. Scott won the August primary with 46.4% of the vote to McCollum's 43.4%.

In the general election, Scott faced Democratic nominee Alex Sink. By October 25, Scott had spent $60 million of his own money on the campaign, compared to Sink's reported $28 million. Scott campaigned as part of the Tea Party movement.

The Fort Myers News-Press quoted Scott as saying he had spent roughly $78 million of his own money on the campaign, although other figures indicate he spent slightly over $75 million. He defeated Sink by around 68,000 votes, or 1.29%. He took office as the 45th governor of Florida on January 4, 2011.

==== 2014 ====
In October 2011, Scott announced that he would run for reelection in 2014. His political funding committee, Let's Get to Work, had raised $28 million for his campaign as of May 2014.

As of early June 2014, Scott had spent almost $13 million since March on television advertisements attacking former governor Charlie Crist, who then appeared to be the likely Democratic nominee, and who was eventually nominated. The ads resulted in a tightening of the race, mainly due to a decline in Crist's favorability ratings, while Scott's favorability ratings did not increase.

By late September 2014, Scott's television ad spending had exceeded $35 million and in mid-October reached $56.5 million, compared to $26.5 million by Crist. On October 22 it was reported that Scott's total spending had exceeded $83 million and he announced that, having previously said he would not do so, he would invest his own money into the campaign, speculated to be as much as $22 million.

Crist hoped to draw strong support from Florida's more than 1.6 million registered black voters, an effort that was challenging given his previous political career as a Republican. A September 2014 Quinnipiac University poll revealed his support among black voters was 72%, well below the 90% analysts believed he needed to defeat Scott.

Scott and Crist met in an October 15 debate held by the Florida Press Association at Broward College. Scott refused to take the stage for seven minutes because Crist had a small electric fan under his lectern. The incident was dubbed "fangate" by media sources such as Politico. On November 4, 2014, Scott and Carlos Lopez-Cantera won the general election against Crist and Annette Taddeo-Goldstein by 64,000 votes. The Libertarian candidates, Adrian Wyllie and Greg Roe, received 223,356 votes.

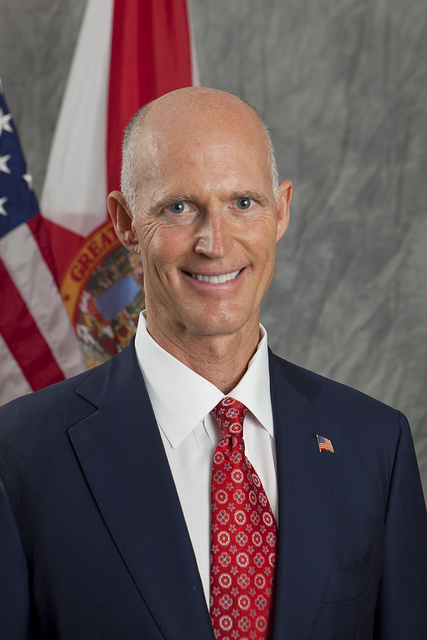
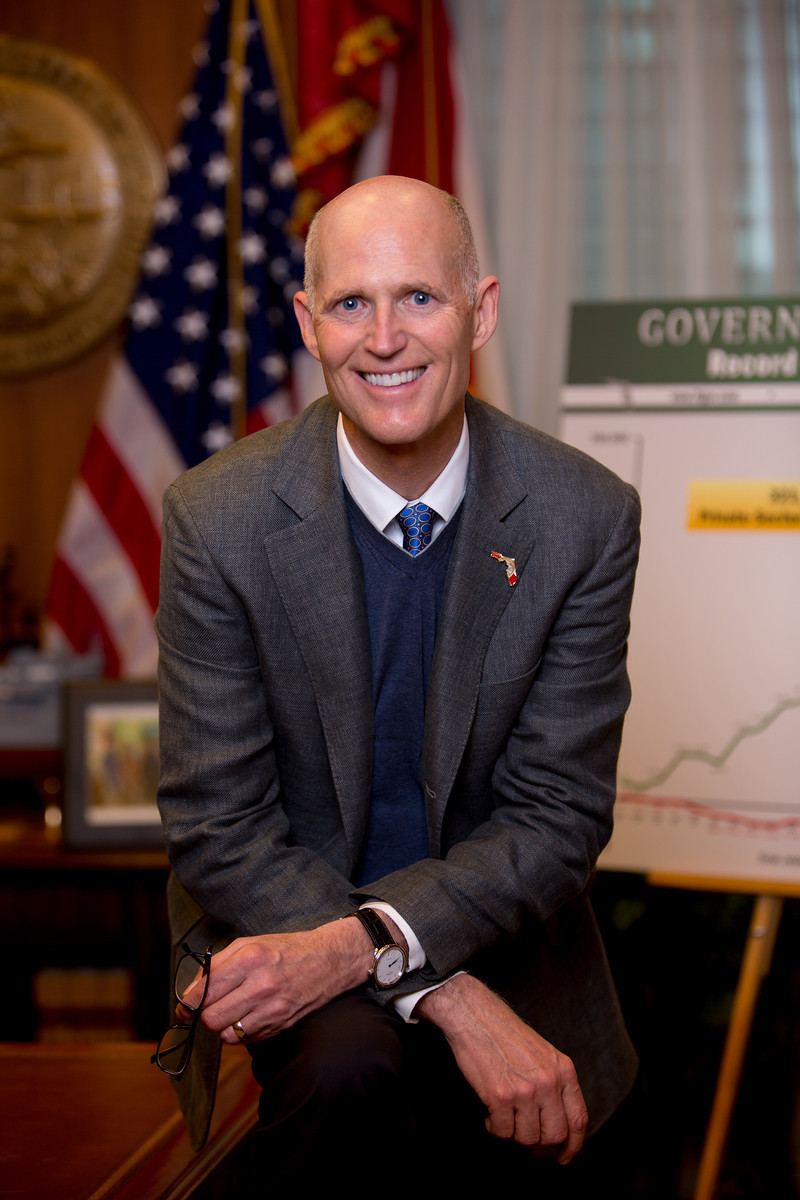
Scott's gubernatorial portraits during his first (left) and second (right) term

=== Tenure ===
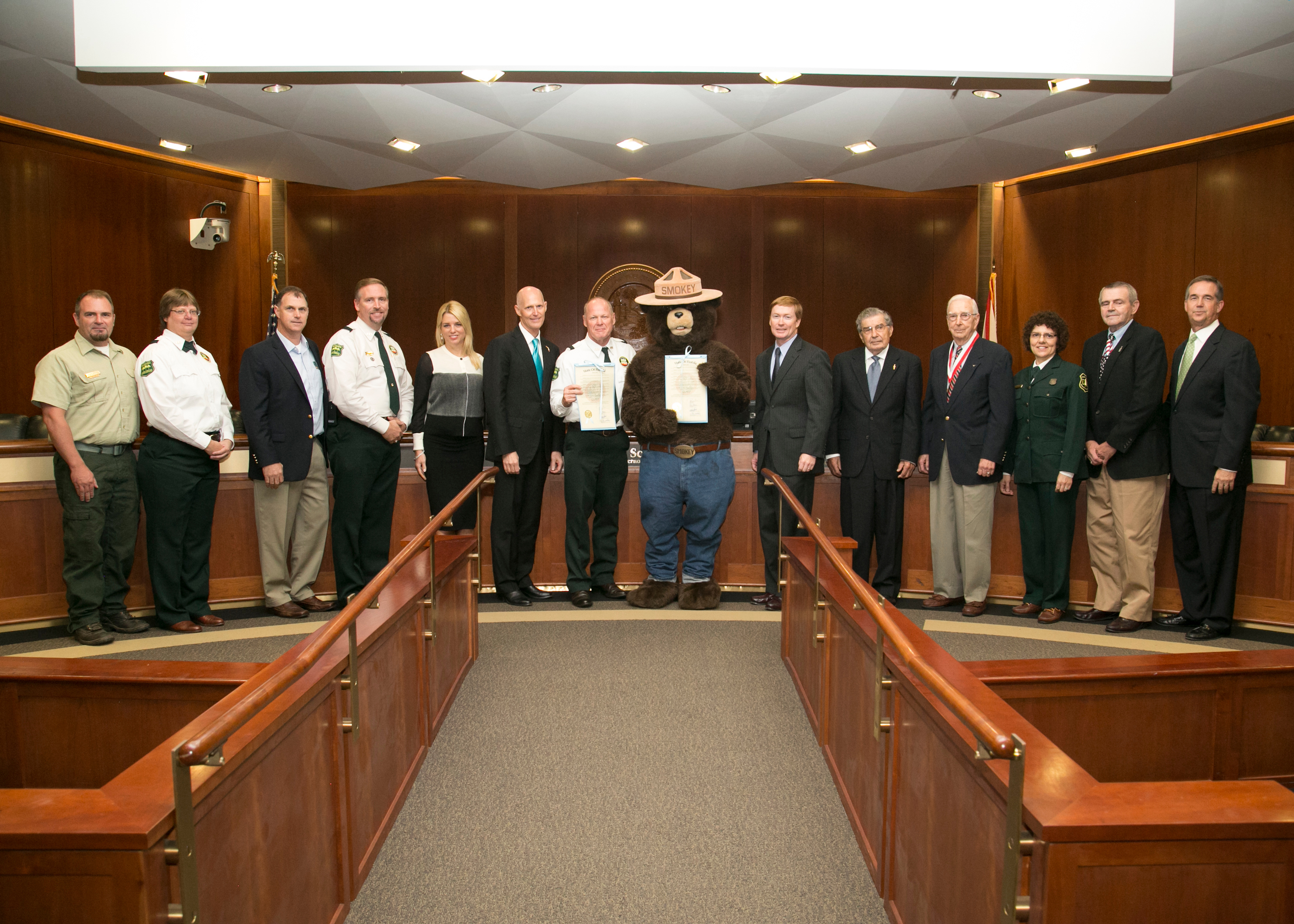
Scott, Florida attorney general Pam Bondi, and other state officials

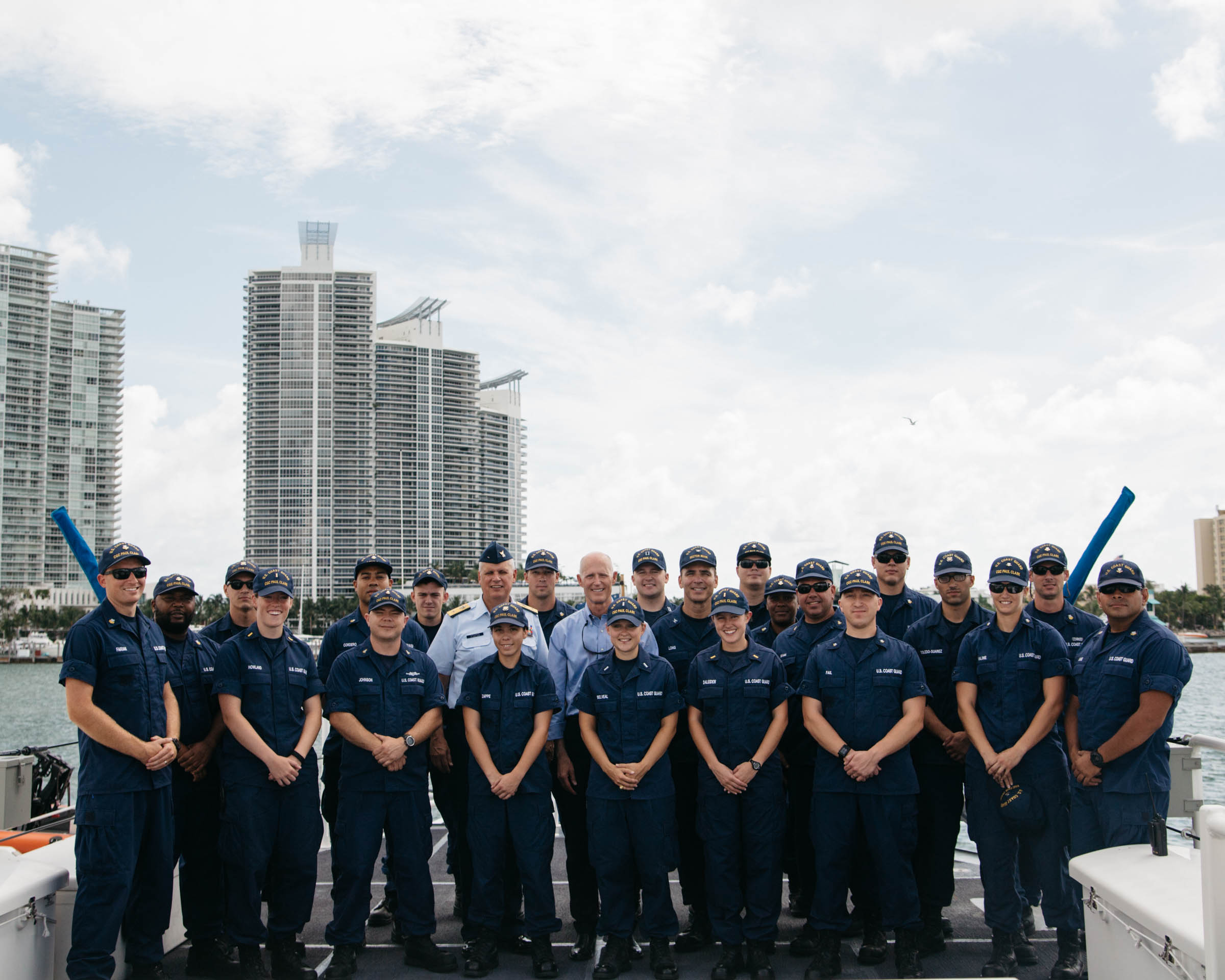
Scott with the Coast Guard in Miami

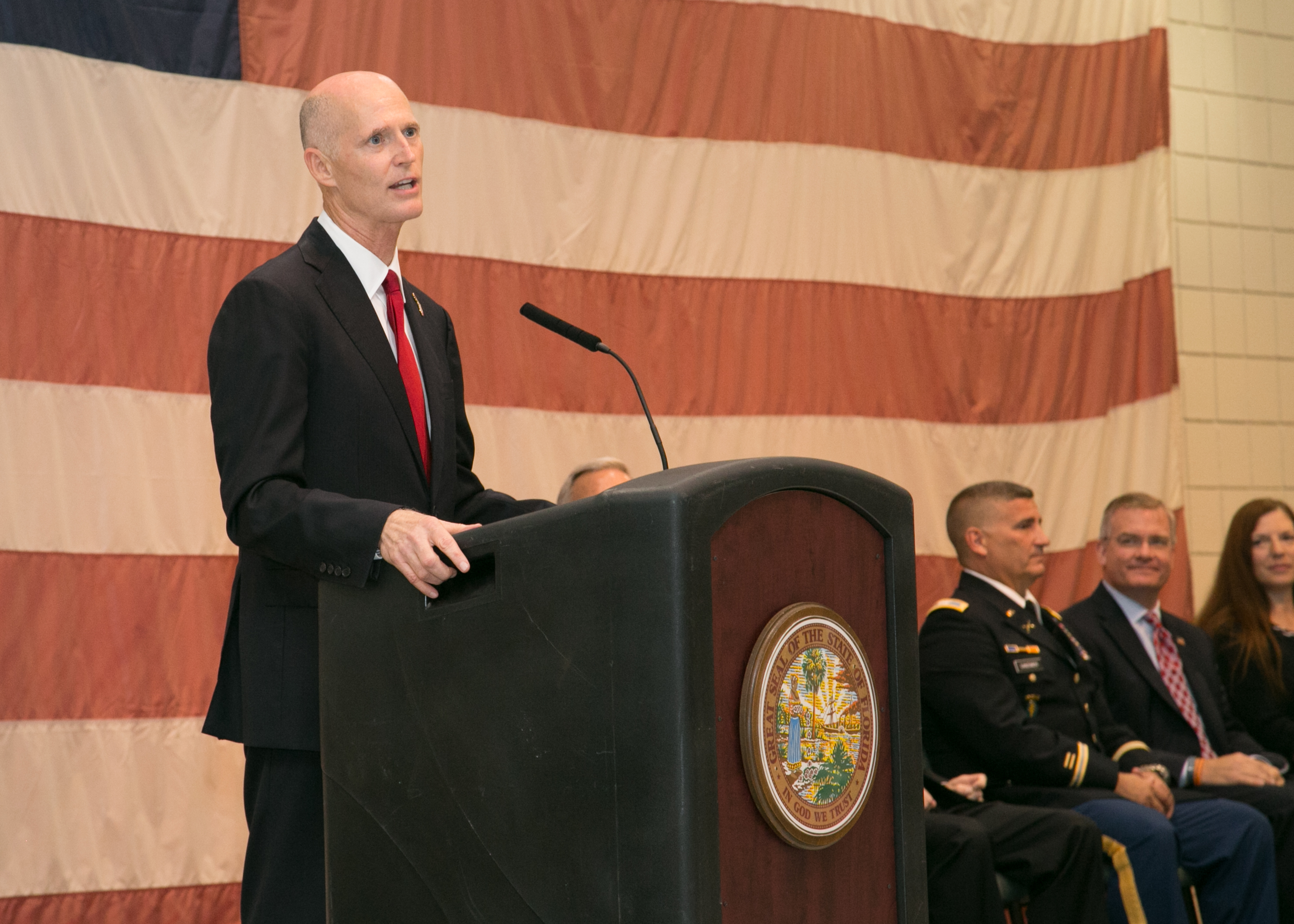
Scott speaking at Veterans Award Ceremony

During Hurricane Irma, Scott led Florida through the largest mass evacuation in U.S. history. He signed a repeal of Florida's 1985 growth management laws, reduced funding for water management districts, reduced oversight at the Florida Department of Environmental Protection, and supported increased funding for Everglades restoration. Scott supported permanent tax cuts and "focused on job numbers rather than on running state agencies or making sweeping policy changes".

Scott had a 26 percent approval rating in December 2011, the lowest among U.S. governors, but it steadily increased during the rest of his governorship. It stood at 45 percent in August 2015, and at 57 percent in April 2017. In the aftermath of Hurricane Irma later that year, Scott's approval rating saw a high of 61 percent. Shortly before he left office, his ratings had fallen to 47 percent approving and 41 percent disapproving.

==== Death penalty ====
In 2013, Scott signed the Timely Justice Act (HB 7101) to overhaul the processes for capital punishment in Florida. The Supreme Court of the United States struck down part of this law in January 2016 in Hurst v. Florida, declaring, in an 8–1 decision, that a judge determining the aggravating facts to be used in considering a death sentence with only a non-binding recommendation from the jury based on a majority vote was insufficient and violated the Sixth Amendment guarantee of a jury trial.

The Florida Legislature passed a new statute to comply with Hurst v. Florida, changing the sentencing method to require a 10-juror supermajority for a sentence of death with a life sentence as the alternative. In October 2016, the Florida Supreme Court struck down this new sentencing scheme, holding that a death sentence must be issued by a unanimous jury. The Florida Supreme Court ruled the law "cannot be applied to pending prosecutions", which means that until the Florida legislature acts, there is no procedure or law allowing a prosecutor to seek the death penalty; the status of sentences passed under the twice struck down provisions was unresolved. The January 2016 United States Supreme Court Hurst decision also left those sentences' status unresolved. The Court granted Hurst a new sentencing hearing after its decision.

During Scott's tenure, Florida executed more inmates (28) than had been executed under any other governor in the state's history. Governor Ron DeSantis later beat this record.

==== Donald Trump ====
In the 2016 Republican primaries, Scott endorsed Trump after Trump won the Florida primary. Scott chaired a pro-Trump super PAC in the 2016 election. Unlike many other establishment Republicans, Scott praised Trump as tough on terrorism and as an outsider during the 2016 Republican convention.

When Trump "sparred with the Muslim father of a slain U.S. soldier", Scott said "I'm never going to agree with every candidate on what they're going to say". When the Donald Trump Access Hollywood tape was publicized, in which Trump spoke of grabbing women "by the pussy", Scott rebuked Trump, saying, "I'm not following politics closely right now, but this is terrible. I don't agree with anyone talking like this about anyone, ever."

==== Drug testing for welfare recipients ====
In June 2011, Scott signed a bill requiring those seeking welfare under the federal Temporary Assistance for Needy Families program to submit to drug screenings. Applicants who fail a drug test may name another person to receive benefits for their children.

In an interview with CNN host Don Lemon, Scott said, "Studies show that people that are on welfare are higher users of drugs than people not on welfare" and "the bottom line is, if they're not using drugs, it's not an issue". PolitiFact said this comment was "half true". Government researchers in 1999–2000 reported "that 9.6 percent of people in families receiving some type of government assistance reported recent drug use, compared to 6.8 percent among people in families receiving no government assistance at all."

Preliminary figures from Florida's program showed that 2.5% of applicants tested positive for drugs, with 2% declining to take the test, while the Justice Department estimated that around 6% of Americans use drugs overall. The law was declared unconstitutional, with the United States Court of Appeals for the Eleventh Circuit upholding that ruling in December 2014. The Scott administration declined to appeal the decision to the US Supreme Court.

==== Economy ====
In Scott's 2010 gubernatorial campaign, he promised to "run the state like you run a business". In his gubernatorial platform, he pledged to create 700,000 jobs in the state; PolitiFact ruled in 2018 that Scott's job creation pledge was a "Promise Kept".

Under Scott, Florida's job creation far outpaced the rest of the nation, while wages were below-average and poverty rates were above-average. During his tenure as governor, Florida employers created nearly 1.5 million jobs, and the state's employment grew 20.3%, compared to 12.5% growth for the U.S. as a whole. Florida's household income is lower than the national average, with a widening gap. At 15.8%, the state's poverty rate is slightly above the national rate of 14.7%.

==== Education ====
In his 2010 gubernatorial campaign, Scott vowed to expand school choice. PolitiFact rated this a "Promise Kept" due to Scott's push to expand school choice as governor. School choice legislation signed by Scott includes the creation of the Hope Scholarship Program, which subsidizes the cost of private school or allows a transfer to another public school for students who were bullied.

In December 2012, Scott announced a plan to encourage students to pursue majors in engineering and science by reducing tuition for some majors.

In 2016, Scott signed a bill allowing parents to pick any public school in the state for their children, regardless of traditional attendance lines or county boundaries.

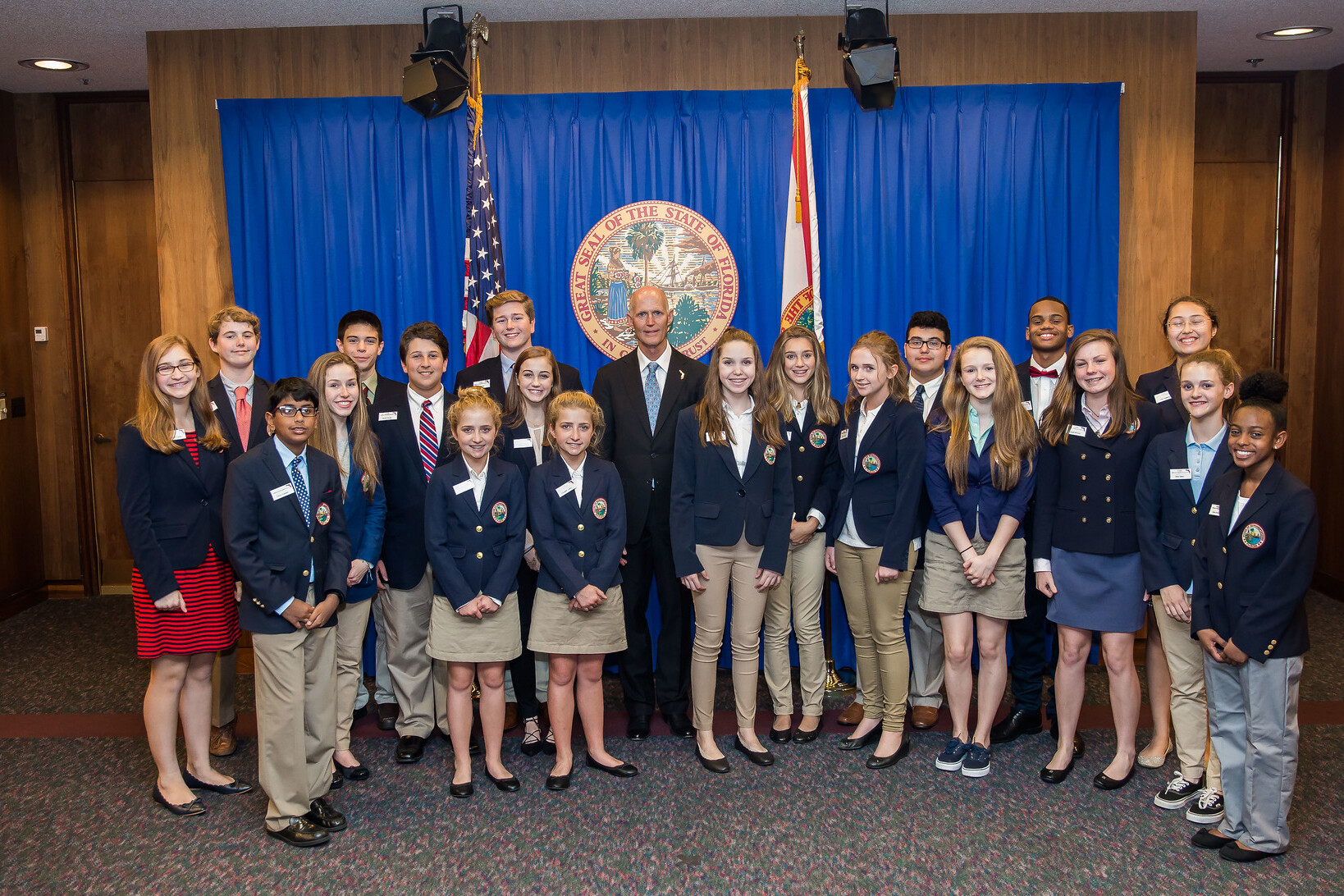
Scott with Florida House of Representatives pages in March 2017

In 2017, Scott signed a $419 million public school bill that included charter school expansion. The bill was supported by House Republicans, school choice proponents, and conservative political groups and it was opposed by superintendents, school boards, parent groups, and teachers unions.

During the summer of 2017, Scott signed a bill (HB 989 and SB 1210) that would allow any Florida resident to "challenge the use or adoption of instructional materials" in public schools. Proponents of the bill argued that it would allow parents to be more proactive in their child's education. Opponents of the bill argued that it would allow more censorship, especially for scientific topics like global warming and evolution.

==== Environment ====
Scott rejects the scientific consensus on climate change, saying "I'm not a scientist". The quote or paraphrases thereof became talking points for some Republican political candidates in the 2014 election campaigns.

When questioned by the press on March 9, 2015, in Hialeah, Florida, Scott did not say whether he believes global warming is a problem or whether Florida's Department of Environmental Protection has made or is making preparations for its potential consequences.

In March 2015, accusations were made that Scott's administration had instructed Department of Environmental Protection officials to avoid the terms "climate change" or "global warming" in official communications. Scott denied that his administration had banned the terms.

Scott cut $700 million from Florida's water management districts over his tenure as governor. The cuts stirred controversy in 2018 when Florida faced a water contamination crisis.

==== Financial disclosures ====
In 2017, Donald Hinkle, a Democratic activist and lawyer, filed a lawsuit claiming that Scott had not disclosed sufficient information about his wealth and holdings and may have underestimated his net worth. Scott appealed to a three-judge panel of the First Circuit Court of Appeals. The appeals court granted a writ of prohibition barring the circuit judge from taking any further action in the case. The five-page ruling agreed with Scott that only the Commission on Ethics "has constitutional authority to investigate Mr. Hinkle's complaint."

==== Gun laws ====
As of February 2018, Scott had an A+ rating from the NRA Political Victory Fund (NRA-PVF), indicating a record of supporting gun rights. The NRA-PVF endorsed Scott in 2010 and 2014, stating in 2014 that he had "signed more pro-gun bills into law–in one term–than any other governor in Florida history".

In 2011, Scott signed the Firearm Owners' Privacy Act (informally called "Docs vs. Glocks"), which made it illegal for doctors and mental health professionals to ask patients about their gun ownership unless they believed "that this information is relevant to the patient's medical care or safety, or the safety of others." Provisions of the law, including the part forbidding doctors from asking about a patient's gun ownership, were struck down as unconstitutional in 2017 by the United States Court of Appeals for the Eleventh Circuit.

On June 9, 2017, Scott signed an expanded version of Florida's stand-your-ground law into law.

In February 2018, after the Stoneman Douglas High School shooting in Parkland, Florida, Scott stated his support for raising the minimum age to purchase a firearm from 18 to 21; at the time of the shooting, 21 was the minimum age to buy a handgun, but rifles could be purchased at age 18. He also announced his support of a ban on bump stocks. Scott said, "I want to make it virtually impossible for anyone who has mental issues to use a gun", requesting $500 million in funds for mental health and school safety programs. In March 2018, the Florida Legislature passed the Marjory Stoneman Douglas High School Public Safety Act, which incorporated many of the measures Scott supported. It raised the minimum age for buying firearms to 21, established waiting periods and background checks, provided a program for the arming of some teachers and the hiring of school police, banned bump stocks, and barred potentially violent or mentally unhealthy people arrested under certain laws from possessing guns. In all, it allocated around $400 million. Scott signed the bill into law on March 9. That same day, the National Rifle Association filed a lawsuit in federal court challenging the law's provision banning gun sales to people under 21. NRA spokesperson Marion Hammer said, "We filed a lawsuit against the state for violating the constitutional rights of 18- to 21-year-olds."

==== Health care ====
Scott has been a harsh critic of the Affordable Care Act (Obamacare), but in his 2018 Senate campaign stopped harshly criticizing the bill. In 2017, he said that people with preexisting conditions should be protected. In June 2018, when the Trump administration sought to remove provisions of Obamacare protecting people with preexisting conditions, Scott declined to criticize the administration, saying he did not know enough about it to comment.

Scott has taken a number of positions on Medicaid expansion. For much of his first term as governor, he opposed Medicaid expansion in Florida, saying it was too costly. In 2013, he came out in support of Medicaid expansion, and reiterated his support in 2014 when he was up for reelection. After being reelected, Scott reversed his position and adamantly fought against efforts by the Florida Senate to pass Medicaid expansion in 2015. Scott rejected the Medicaid expansion because of his renewed fiscal concerns, saying it is "hard to understand how the state could take on even more federal programs."

Scott has been accused of having fueled an HIV epidemic while governor, by ensuring that Florida returned $54 million in unspent federal HIV-prevention grants and blocking $16 million in CDC grants to Miami-Dade and Broward counties. The effect of this rejection of federal funds combined with Scott's stance on Medicaid expansion has been described as "helping explain why the state's HIV epidemic became almost peerlessly severe during Scott's time in office", with the state accounting for 13% of the country's HIV diagnoses in 2017. Scott has opposed most federal grants due to his fiscal conservatism.

==== Hurricane Irma ====
Scott's handling of Hurricane Irma boosted his profile in advance of his U.S. Senate campaign, with The Hill writing that his "aggressive approach to Irma, which saw him order an extensive evacuation ahead of the storm and coordinate disaster relief efforts as the storm came ashore, has sent his political stock even higher".

An investigation by WFOR-TV found that after Hurricane Irma, Scott ignored existing debris removal contracts and instead issued emergency contracts for hurricane clean-up efforts. Florida state officials sent an email to several companies on September 11 inviting them to hand in bids for debris clean-up by the next day. State officials believed new contracts were needed to speed up the removal process given the severity of Hurricane Irma. On September 13, state officials decided to use the services of MCM and Community Asphalt, firms owned by contributors to the Republican Party and Scott's campaigns. According to the television station, the emergency contracts cost $28 to $30 million more than the existing contracts.

==== Immigration and refugees ====
In 2010, Scott ran for governor as an immigration hard-liner. At the time, he favored similar laws as Arizona's controversial Arizona SB 1070 which targeted illegal immigrants, and criticized Florida lawmakers for not being tougher on illegal immigrants. Scott called for police to check individuals' immigration status. By 2014, PolitiFact wrote that Scott had "abandoned promises to get tough on illegal immigration." Over time, he moderated his views on immigration.

In 2011, Scott opposed giving in-state tuition for illegal immigrants, but reversed course in 2014 and signed a bill giving DREAMers in-state tuition in an effort to place limits on how much state institutions can raise tuition each year. In 2013, Scott vetoed legislation that would have given DACA-eligible immigrants the ability to obtain temporary driving licenses. By 2018, he spoke in favor of giving DREAMers a path to citizenship.

In June 2018, Scott opposed the Trump administration family separation policy, which involved separating children from their parents, relatives, or other adults who accompanied them in crossing the border, sending the parents to federal jails and placing children and infants under the supervision of the U.S. Department of Health and Human Services. In a letter to United States secretary of health and human services Alex Azar, Scott wrote: "I have been very clear that I absolutely do not agree with the practice of separating children from their families. This practice needs to stop now."

Scott's administration awarded Comprehensive Health Services, Inc. (CHSi) a tax incentive package of $600,000 to expand in Cape Canaveral, Florida. CHSi runs the Homestead Temporary Shelter for Unaccompanied Children which detains minor migrants, including those separated from families at the border.

==== Medical marijuana ====
After voters approved a constitutional amendment to legalize medical marijuana, Scott signed a bill passed by the legislature which allowed the use of medical marijuana but not smokeable medical marijuana. A judge ruled the ban on smokeable medical marijuana unconstitutional. Scott appealed the decision.

==== Predictive policing ====
On September 3, 2020, the Tampa Bay Times released an investigative report into Scott-appointed Pasco County Sheriff Chris Nocco's "predictive policing" program, which relies on unproven algorithms. The program is designed to use counter-terrorism and other military "intelligence" tactics to prevent property damage. Nocco was a Republican insider with limited law enforcement experience at the time he was appointed by Scott, in 2011.

==== Redistricting amendments ====
In the 2010 elections, Florida voters passed constitutional amendments banning gerrymandering of congressional and legislative districts. In February 2011, Scott withdrew a request to the United States Department of Justice to approve these amendments, which, according to The Miami Herald, might delay the implementation of the redistricting plan because the Voting Rights Act requires preclearance of state laws likely to affect minority representation. Scott said he wanted to make sure the redistricting was carried out properly.

Several advocacy groups sued Scott in federal court to compel him to resubmit the acts to the Justice Department.

==== Transportation ====
On February 16, 2011, Scott rejected $2.3 billion in federal funding to develop high-speed rail between Tampa and Orlando. He cited California's experience with high-speed rail, namely much lower than expected ridership and cost overruns that doubled the final price. In response, a veto-proof majority in the Florida Senate approved a letter rebuking Scott and asking the Department of Transportation to continue funding. On March 1, 2011, two Florida state senators filed a petition with the Florida Supreme Court to compel Scott to accept the rail funds on the grounds that he lacked constitutional authority to reject funds that had been approved by a prior legislature. On March 4, the Florida Supreme Court ruled that Scott's rejection of the rail funds did not violate the Constitution of Florida.

In March 2011, Scott moved to have the Florida Department of Transportation amend its work plan to include $77 million for dredging PortMiami to a depth of 50 feet. Once the port is dredged, Panamax-sized vessels coming through the expanded Panama Canal could load and unload cargo there.

In 2018, Scott reversed course and supported a high-speed rail project between Tampa and Orlando when the company All Aboard Florida sought to get taxpayer-backed funding from state and federal governments. He argued that new budget surpluses following the recession could help fund the project. Scott and his wife had invested at least $3 million in the parent company of All Aboard Florida, which had made donations to Scott's political campaigns.

==== Voting rights ====
Scott frequently sought to implement voter IDs as governor, with numerous courts ruling against him in voting rights cases. He signed into law bills that created barriers to registering new voters, limited early voting, ended early voting on the Sunday before Election Day (known as "souls to the polls" in African-American churches), and restricted the ability of ex-felons to restore their voting rights. In 2012, Scott attempted to purge non-citizens from voter rolls just before the election; a court stopped him from doing so, and it was revealed that legitimate voters were on the voter rolls. The Tampa Bay Times noted that under Scott's tenure, Florida had the longest voting lines of any state in the 2012 election. After harsh criticism, he expanded early voting hours, and allowed early voting on the Sunday before Election Day. Florida's then Secretary of State Ken Detzner later remarked the voter roll purge "should" and "could" have been better.

In 2016, Scott refused to extend registration deadlines after ordering evacuations due to Hurricane Matthew; courts ultimately extended the deadline. He signed legislation into law that rejected mail ballots where signatures on the ballot envelope did not match signatures in files; in 2016 a court struck down the law. In 2014, Scott blocked a request by the city of Gainesville to use a facility at the University of Florida as a site for early voting. In July 2018, a judge ruled against Scott's prohibition of early voting on campus, saying the ban showed a "stark pattern of discrimination." In 2013, Scott ordered Pinellas County to close down sites where voters could submit mail ballots. In 2012, a court ruled that Scott could not place heavy fines on groups that registered voters but failed to submit the registrations within 48 hours.

Scott rolled back automatic restoration of rights for nonviolent crimes, giving former felons a five- to six-year waiting period before they can apply for a restoration of voting rights. Of the approximately 30,000 applications from former felons to have their voting rights restored during his tenure, Scott approved approximately 3,000. A 2018 investigation by the Palm Beach Post found that during his governorship, Scott restored the voting rights of three times as many white men as black men, and that blacks accounted only for 27% of those granted voting rights despite blacks being 43% of those released from state prisons in the past 20 years. The percentage of blacks among those whose voting rights were restored was the lowest in more than 50 years, and Scott restored a higher share of Republican voting rights than Democratic voting rights than in almost 50 years. A clemency board set up by Scott held hearings on applications, but there were no standards on how to judge the worthiness of individual applications. In March 2017, seven former felons filed a class action lawsuit arguing that the clemency board's decisions were inconsistent, vague and political.

In February 2018, a U.S. District Court described Scott's process as arbitrary and unconstitutional, and ruled that he had to create a new process to restore felons' voting rights. The ruling said that Scott and his clemency board had "unfettered discretion" to deny voting rights "for any reason," and that "to vote again, disenfranchised citizens must kowtow before a panel of high-level government officials over which Florida's governor has absolute veto authority. No standards guide the panel. Its members alone must be satisfied that these citizens deserve restoration." The Brennan Center for Justice described the clemency rules issued by Scott in 2011 as among the most restrictive in the country.

== U.S. Senate ==
=== Elections ===
==== 2018 ====
After months of speculation about a potential run, Scott officially announced on April 9, 2018, that he would challenge incumbent Democratic U.S. Senator Bill Nelson in the 2018 election.

Scott defeated Rocky De La Fuente in the Republican primary. In the general election, Scott's involvement in a large Medicare fraud case stirred controversy. Scott responded with ads accusing Nelson of having cut Medicare benefits and stolen from Medicare; fact-checkers found that both of Scott's assertions were false. During the campaign, Scott called Nelson a "socialist", an assertion PolitiFact described as "pants-on-fire" false. Scott sought to avoid mentioning Trump and at times criticized or distanced himself from actions of the Trump administration, whereas in the past he had used his friendship with Trump to boost his profile and had been an early and vocal supporter of Trump in 2016. Trump endorsed Scott for Senate.

The initial election results showed Scott leading Nelson by 12,562 votes, or 0.15% of the vote. Under Florida law, a manual recount is triggered if election results show a margin of less than 0.5% of the vote. Both candidates filed lawsuits in connection with the recount. After the recount, Florida elections officials announced on November 18, 2018, that Scott had prevailed. Scott received 50.05% of the vote to Nelson's 49.93%; the margin of victory was 10,033 votes out of 8.19 million votes cast. Nelson then conceded. It was the most expensive Senate race in the nation in 2018. After the race, Scott's Super PAC, New Republican PAC, received criticism from across the political spectrum for its aggressive practices and was the subject of several FEC complaints for multiple violations of federal election law; the Super PAC's finances are chaired by hedge fund billionaire Ken Griffin, who personally donated at least $10 million to the PAC.

==== 2024 ====
Scott ran for a second Senate term. He defeated Democratic nominee Debbie Mucarsel-Powell, a former congresswoman by over 12 percentage points. Scott became Florida's senior senator in January 2025, when Marco Rubio resigned to become Secretary of State.

=== Tenure ===
The Senate term for the 116th Congress began on January 3, 2019, but Scott's term as governor ended on January 8. On December 4, 2018, Scott's office announced that he would finish his term as governor and not resign early. Scott attended the ceremonial swearing-in of his successor as governor, Ron DeSantis, on the morning of January 8, 2019, in front of Florida's historic Old Capitol. Scott left the ceremony early to fly to Washington, D.C., and was sworn in to the Senate by Vice President Mike Pence later that afternoon.

==== First Trump administration ====
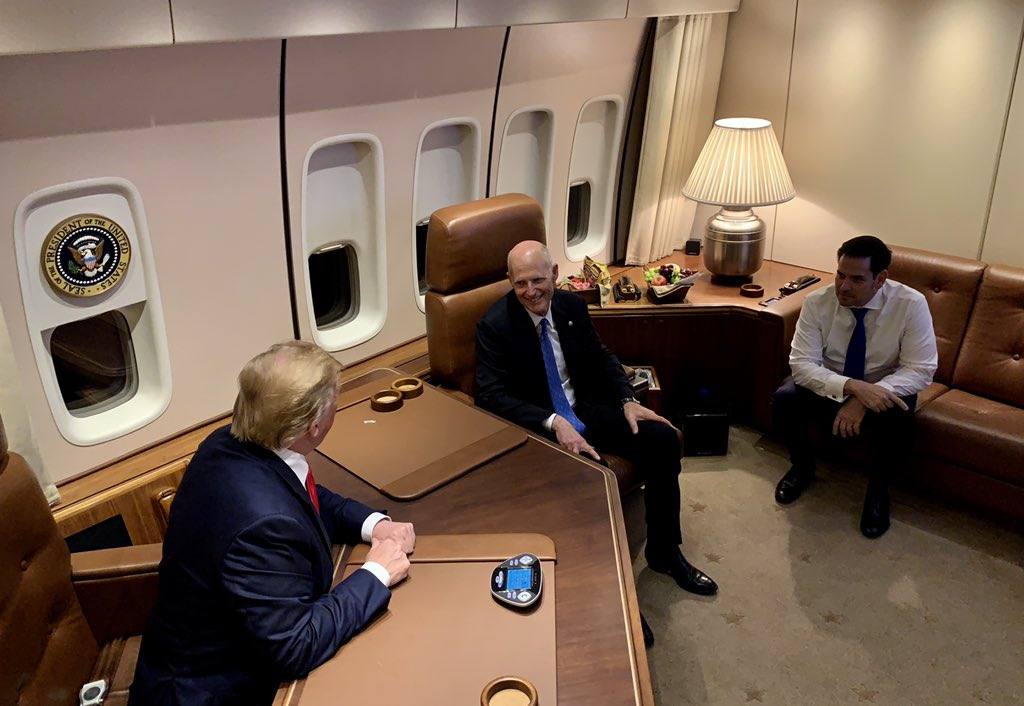
Scott, President Donald Trump, and Senator Marco Rubio aboard Air Force One in 2019

In January 2019, Scott encouraged Trump to declare a national emergency to build a border wall if Congress would not give him the funds to do so. In February 2019, when Trump declared a national emergency, Scott applauded the decision.

In April 2019, amid calls for an American military intervention in Venezuela, Scott said that the Maduro regime was perpetrating a "genocide" and that the U.S. was "not aggressive enough" about the situation. Fact-checkers and experts described Scott's assertion of a genocide as false and misguided. Scott called on the U.S. to position its military assets to be prepared to respond to events in Venezuela.

In May 2020, Scott voted for an amendment co-sponsored by Senators Steve Daines and Ron Wyden that would have required federal intelligence and law enforcement agencies to obtain federal court warrants when collecting web search engine data from American citizens, nationals, or residents under the Foreign Intelligence Surveillance Act (FISA).

After Supreme Court Justice Ruth Bader Ginsburg died on September 18, 2020, Scott sided with Senator Mitch McConnell and called on her replacement to be voted on before that year's presidential election.

After Donald Trump lost the 2020 presidential election while making false claims of fraud, Scott voted to object to seating the electors from Pennsylvania but voted against the other objection raised for seating the electors from Arizona. Both objections were rejected by the Senate, 92–7 and 93–6, respectively.

==== Biden administration ====
In April 2021, Scott ran unopposed for the chairmanship of the National Republican Senatorial Committee and was formally selected on November 10, 2020, succeeding Senator Todd Young.

In March 2021, Scott voted against the American Rescue Plan Act; after it passed, he called upon Florida and other states to reject federal assistance from the package.

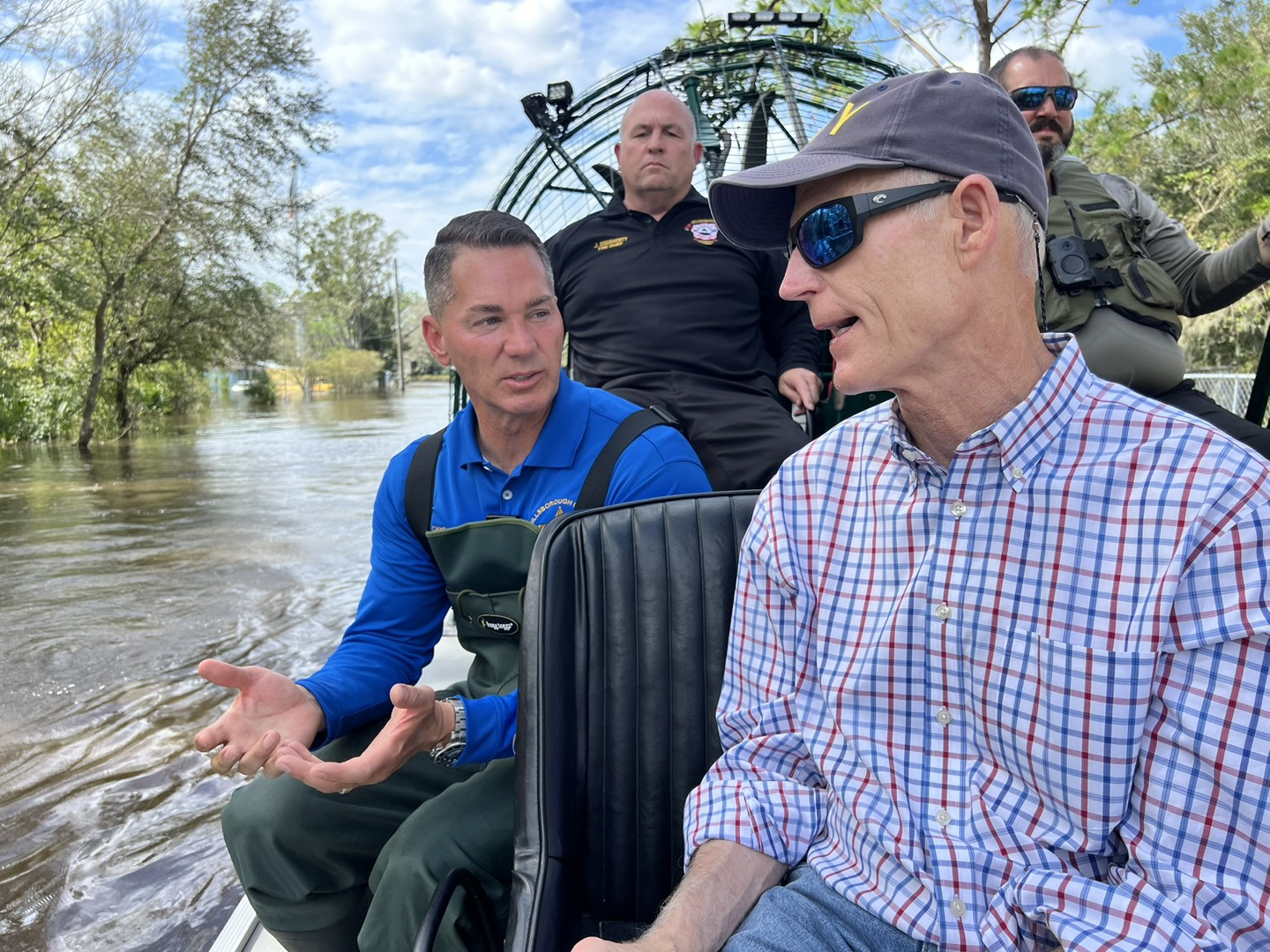
Scott and Sheriff Chad Chronister surveying damage in Hillsborough County after Hurricane Milton

In May 2021, Scott voted against creating an independent commission to investigate the January 6 United States Capitol attack.

On March 10, 2022, Scott was one of 31 Republicans to vote against a $1.5 trillion spending bill that included $13.6 billion in military assistance for Ukraine's defense, arguing that it was filled with lawmakers' "pet" projects. On March 17, he was one of more than two dozen Senate Republicans who demanded that President Biden send Ukraine more support.

In 2022, Scott voted against the Bipartisan Safer Communities Act, a gun reform bill introduced following a deadly school shooting at Robb Elementary School in Uvalde, Texas. The bill enhanced background checks for firearm purchasers under the age of 21, provided funding for school-based mental health services, and partially closed the gun show loophole and boyfriend loophole.

Scott supported the overturning of Roe v. Wade in June 2022, saying that Roe v. Wade was "flawed legal reasoning" and that the Supreme Court had defended "human dignity" and federalism.

Scott voted against the Inflation Reduction Act in 2022, which allows Medicare to negotiate lower drug prices. In August 2022, Scott published an open letter encouraging job seekers not to apply for newly funded positions at the IRS, vowing that Republicans, if they took control of Congress in January 2023, would quickly "defund" those jobs. The letter to job seekers included the statement, "The IRS is making it very clear that you not only need to be ready to audit and investigate your fellow hardworking Americans, your neighbors and friends, you need to be ready and, to use the IRS's words, willing, to kill them."

In August 2022, Business Insider found that Scott had violated the Stop Trading on Congressional Knowledge (STOCK) Act of 2012, a federal transparency and conflict-of-interest law that requires members of Congress to report certain types of financial transactions within 45 days, after Scott and his wife sold stock in Emida Corporation worth up to $450,000 in September 2021 and Scott did not report it until August 2022.

In 2022, Scott voted against the Respect for Marriage Act.

On November 14, 2022, Scott announced he would attempt to challenge incumbent Mitch McConnell for the position of Senate Minority Leader in the 118th United States Congress, the first challenge McConnell had faced for the position since winning it in 2006. Scott said, "the status quo is broken and big change is needed" and that Senate Republican leadership needed "to listen to [Republican voters'] calls for action and start governing in Washington like we campaign back at home", in the wake of the party's failure to gain Senate seats in that year's elections. Scott received 10 votes to McConnell's 37, with one senator voting "present". The vote was held by secret ballot; senators who publicly confirmed voting for Scott included Mike Braun, Josh Hawley, Ted Cruz, Ron Johnson, and Lindsey Graham.

In March 2023, Scott voted against repealing the Authorization for Use of Military Force (AUMF) in Iraq.

Scott was among the 31 Senate Republicans who voted against final passage of the Fiscal Responsibility Act of 2023.

Notable Senate bills that Scott has sponsored or co-sponsored include the Sunshine Protection Act, which makes daylight saving time in the United States permanent; the PROTECT Kids Act, which cuts federal funding to schools that allow students to change their preferred pronouns and keep their sexual orientation from their parents; the National Defense Authorization Act for Fiscal Year 2022; and the END FENTANYL Act. Scott also expressed support for "automatic" capital punishment of school shooters in the wake of the Covenant School shooting in Nashville.

In January 2024, Scott voted against a resolution proposed by Senator Bernie Sanders that would have applied the human rights provisions of the Foreign Assistance Act to U.S. military aid to Israel. The proposal was defeated, 72 to 11.

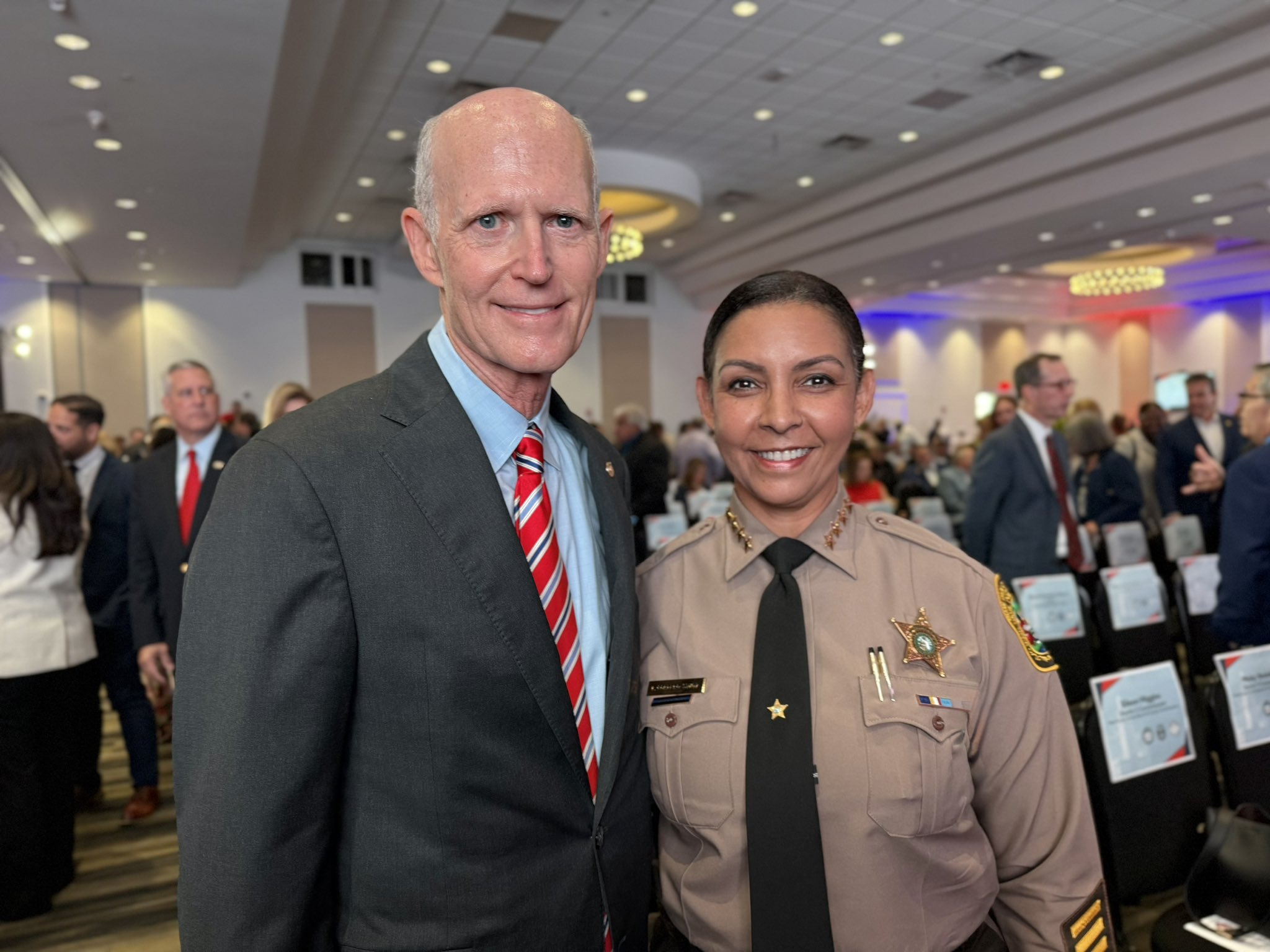
Scott with Miami-Dade County sheriff Rosie Cordero-Stutz, 2025

==== Plan to Rescue America ====
On February 22, 2022, Scott released his controversial 11-Point Plan to Rescue America in response to Democratic criticism that Republicans were unwilling to provide any kind of agenda should they win the House and/or Senate that year. Particularly singled out were a proposal that would force all Americans to pay at least some income tax "to have skin in the game" and one that would make all federal legislation sunset within five years. While the latter proposal did not mention any specific legislation, Social Security and Medicare were singled out elsewhere as programs that could be affected. Other proposals in the plan included closing the United States Department of Education, punishing universities that practice affirmative action, stripping all funding from sanctuary cities, completing the Mexico–United States border wall, reducing the size of the federal government and its workforce, mandatory voter ID, increasing police funding and law and order policies, mandating the Pledge of Allegiance in schools, allowing legal action against social media platforms for deplatforming, banning transgender women from participating in women's sports, banning the supposed teaching of critical race theory, expanding religious freedom, and various attacks on "wokeness" and diversity training.

Democrats, including President Biden, strongly attacked the plan. The Republican response was mixed. Senate Minority Leader Mitch McConnell criticized the provisions on income tax and sunsetting federal legislation, and Senator John Cornyn said the plan "is not an approach embraced by the entire Republican conference" and not something that should be focused on until after the election. Senator Ron Johnson said he supported Scott for releasing his platform and agreed with most of it. Senators Mike Braun and Tommy Tuberville also praised the platform.

On June 8, 2022, Scott released a revision of the plan that replaced the income tax proposal with a proposal not to provide government assistance to "able-bodied Americans under 60 [without] young children or incapacitated dependents" who are not working. He also added a 12th point containing various tax proposals and clarifying that the plan "cuts taxes", in response to Biden's criticisms of his income tax proposal.

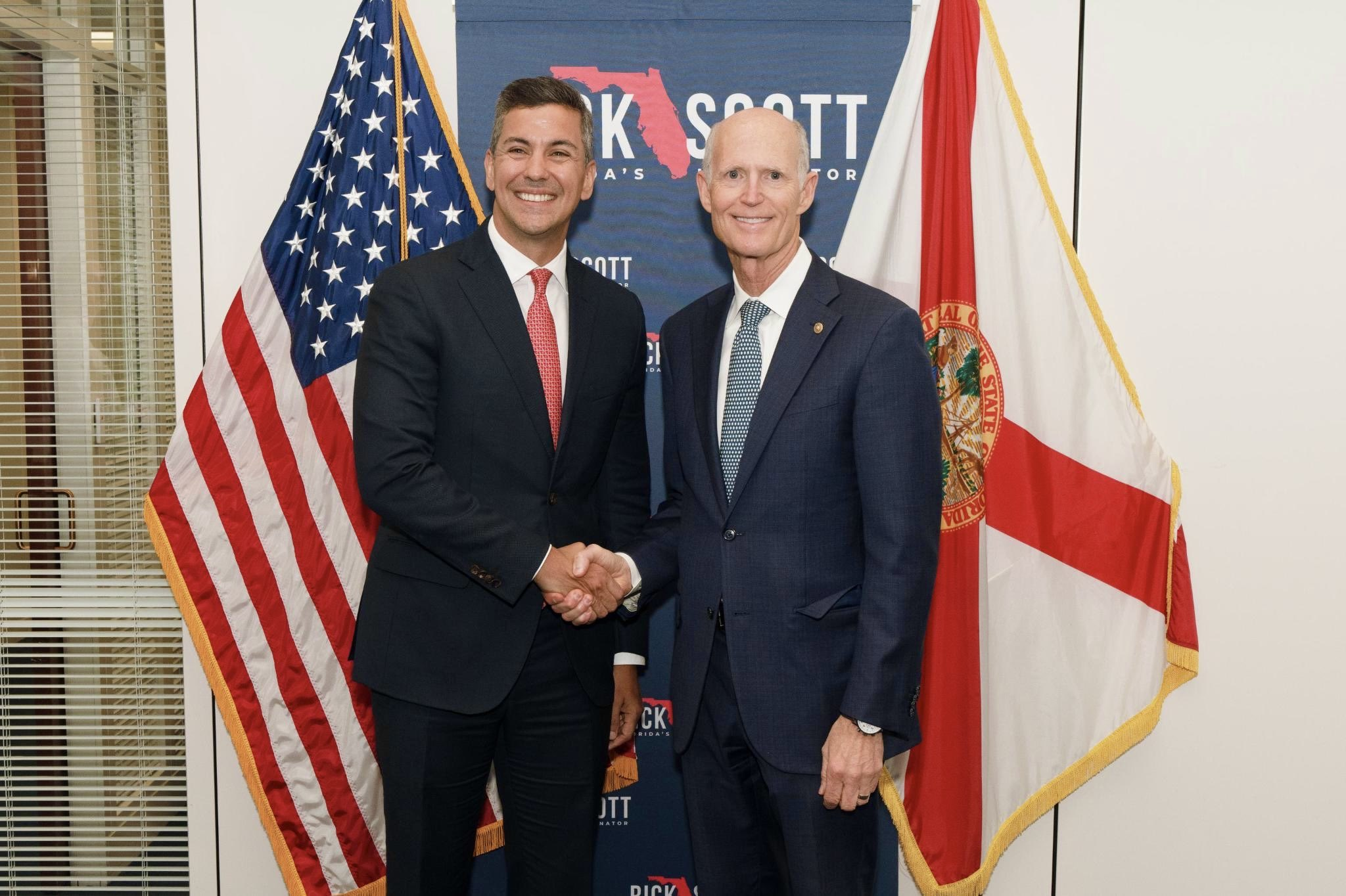
Scott with President Santiago Peña

==== Senate Majority Leader election ====
After the November 2024 U.S. elections, in which Republicans carried the Senate, Scott was one of three announced candidates to be the next Senate Majority Leader in a race to replace the retiring Mitch McConnell. The others were John Thune and John Cornyn. Senator Mike Lee hosted a candidate forum on November 12. The election was held on November 13 by secret ballot. Scott was eliminated on the first ballot with 13 votes, and Thune won on the second with 29.

==== Second Trump administration ====
In February 2025, Scott said that the suspected murderer of Brian Thompson should be sentenced to death if convicted, but also opened the possibility for a "legitimate" conversation about healthcare reform.

===== 119th United States Congress Committee assignments =====
- Committee on Armed Services
  - Subcommittee on Personnel
  - Subcommittee on Seapower (Chairman)
  - Subcommittee on Readiness and Management Support
- Committee on Homeland Security and Governmental Affairs
- Committee on the Budget
- Special Committee on Aging (Chairman)
- Committee on Foreign Relations

== Net worth and investments ==
Scott's net worth was estimated at US$219 million in 2010, $84 million in 2012, and $133 million in 2013. On July 1, 2015, it was reported that Scott's net worth had grown to $147 million, $149 million on December 31, 2016, and $232 million on December 31, 2017. For August 2018, his net worth was estimated at $255 million. Based on financial disclosure reports covering 2020, Business Insider reports that Scott has a minimum net worth of just over $200 million, making him the wealthiest member of Congress.

=== Creation of "blind trust" ===
Early in his gubernatorial tenure, Scott said he created a blind trust for his holdings to avoid the appearance of a conflict of interest. In October 2018, The New York Times reported that the trust in question was blind in name only, and that there were various ways in which Scott could know what his precise holdings were. The holdings in question included investments in companies and funds that Scott could have had an impact on through his administration's policies. The trust in question was managed by one of Scott's former personal assistants from before he became governor.

In February 2019, Scott announced that he would no longer keep his holdings in a trust.

=== Controversial investments ===
In 2017, Scott and his wife held stocks in firms that did business with the Maduro government in Venezuela and a shipping firm with close ties to Russia. Scott had been a harsh critic of the Maduro regime and chastised companies that invested in Venezuela, saying, "Any organization that does business with the Maduro regime cannot do business with the state of Florida." By 2018, Scott and his wife no longer held stocks in the firms with links to Russia or Venezuela.

In a July 2018 financial disclosure statement, Scott and his wife reported earnings of at least $2.9 million in hedge funds registered in the Cayman Islands, a well-known tax haven. The financial statement said that the assets were held in a blind trust and a 2018 campaign spokesperson said Scott did not have a role in selecting particular investments.

Scott and his wife invested at least $3 million in the parent company of All Aboard Florida, a rail investment company that proposed to build high-speed rail between Orlando and Tampa. In 2018, Scott supported the efforts of the company to build the rail and get taxpayer-financing. He had previously, early in his tenure as governor, rejected $2.3 billion in federal funding to develop high-speed rail between Tampa and Orlando. Scott stated the original project was fiscally irresponsible given the recession, and he supported a public-private partnership approach when the state's finances were in order.

Scott was an investor in the firm Conduent Inc., which was awarded a $287 million Florida contract in 2015 to manage SunPass, the toll program in the state of Florida. Due to glitches in SunPass, motorists were charged bank fees and overdraft charges, and the Florida Department of Transportation was criticized for failing to take action. Scott, a Conduent investor, defended the department's handling of the SunPass controversy.

=== IRS leak ===
Scott revealed that he was among the victims of Charles Littlejohn's IRS tax data leak that targeted people of high net worth when he wrote a letter to Merrick Garland protesting the single felony charge. Speaking in court in 2024, Scott testified, "every American is a victim here" and said the plea agreement was a political scheme.

== Personal life ==
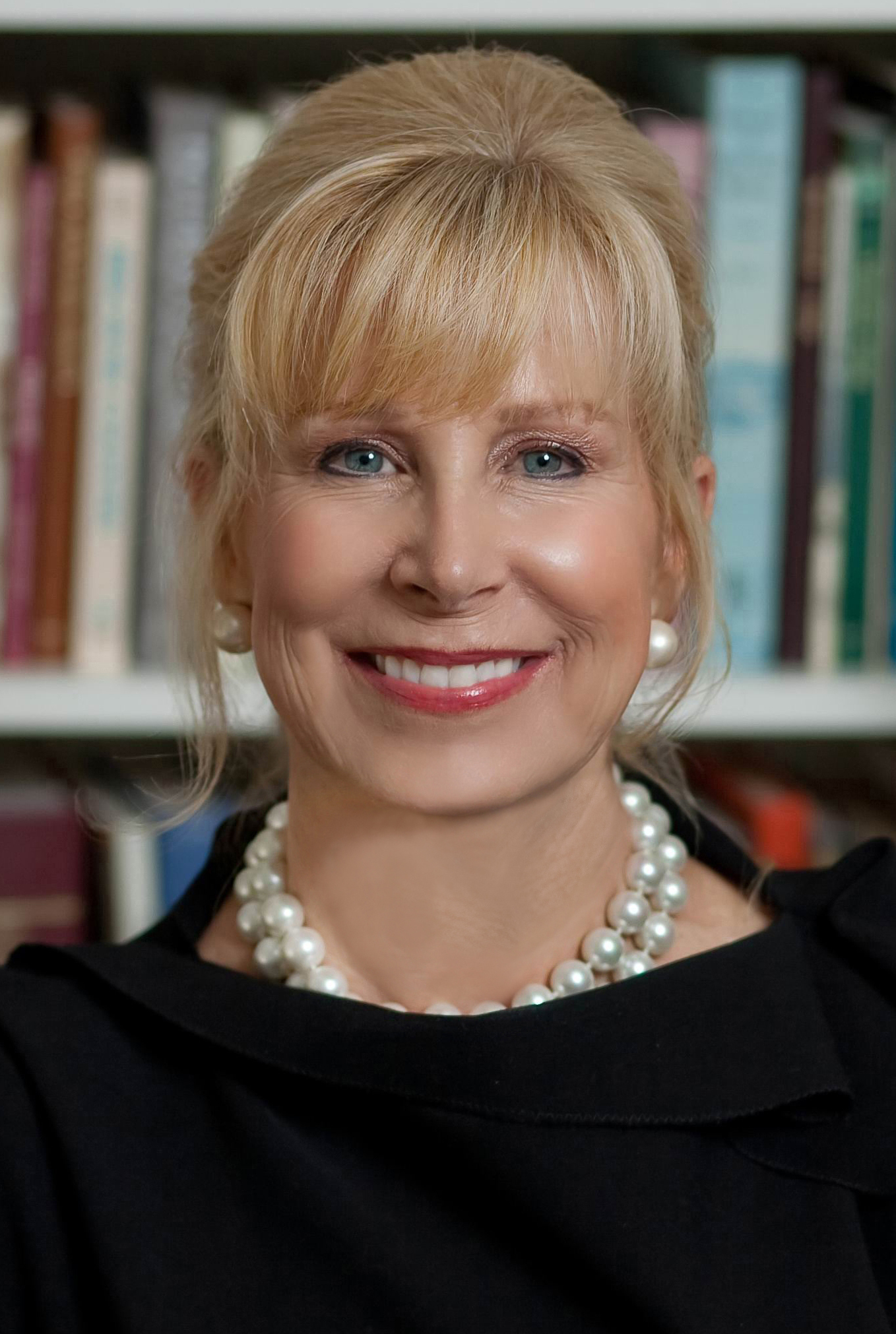
Scott's wife, Ann Holland

On April 20, 1972, Scott, then aged 19, married his high school sweetheart, Frances Annette Holland (born May 11, 1952), who was also 19 years old. The couple has two daughters and six grandsons. They live in Naples, Florida, and are founding members of Naples Community Church.

=== Swatting ===
Scott was swatted in December as part of the 2023 swatting of American politicians. His residence was the target of another swatting attempt in November 2025, though he was not home at the time of the incident.

== Electoral history ==
2010 Florida gubernatorial election (Republican primary)
| Party | Candidate | Votes | % |
|---|---|---|---|
| Republican | Rick Scott | 595,474 | 46.4% |
| Republican | Bill McCollum | 557,427 | 43.4% |
| Republican | Mike McCalister | 130,056 | 10.1% |
| Total votes | | 1,282,957 | 100.0% |

2010 Florida gubernatorial election
| Party | Candidate | Votes | % | ±% |
|---|---|---|---|---|
| Republican | Rick Scott / Jennifer Carroll | 2,619,335 | 48.87% | −3.31% |
| Democratic | Alex Sink / Rod Smith | 2,557,785 | 47.72% | +2.62% |
| Independence | Peter Allen | 123,831 | 2.31% | N/A |
| Independent | C. C. Reed | 18,842 | 0.35% | N/A |
| Independent | Michael E. Arth | 18,644 | 0.35% | N/A |
| Independent | Daniel Imperato | 13,690 | 0.26% | N/A |
| Independent | Farid Khavari | 7,487 | 0.14% | N/A |
| Write-in | | 121 | 0.00% | N/A |
| Plurality | | 61,550 | 1.15% | −5.92% |
| Total votes | | 5,359,735 | 100.0% | N/A |
| Republican gain from Independent | | | | |

2014 Florida gubernatorial election (Republican primary)
| Party | Candidate | Votes | % |
|---|---|---|---|
| Republican | Rick Scott (Incumbent) | 831,887 | 87.65% |
| Republican | Elizabeth Cuevas-Neunder | 100,496 | 10.59% |
| Republican | Yinka Adeshina | 16,761 | 1.77% |
| Total votes | | 949,144 | 100.0% |

2014 Florida gubernatorial election
| Party | Candidate | Votes | % | ±% |
|---|---|---|---|---|
| Republican | Rick Scott / Carlos López-Cantera (incumbent) | 2,865,343 | 48.14% | −0.73% |
| Democratic | Charlie Crist / Annette Taddeo | 2,801,198 | 47.07% | −0.65% |
| Libertarian | Adrian Wyllie / Greg Roe | 223,356 | 3.75% | N/A |
| Independent | Glenn Burkett / Jose Augusto Matos | 41,341 | 0.70% | N/A |
| Independent | Farid Khavari / Lateresa A. Jones | 20,186 | 0.34% | +0.20% |
| Write-in | | 137 | 0.00% | 0.00% |
| Total votes | | 5,951,571 | 100.0% | N/A |
| Republican hold | | | | |

2018 United States Senate election in Florida (Republican primary)
| Party | Candidate | Votes | % |
|---|---|---|---|
| Republican | Rick Scott | 1,456,187 | 88.61% |
| Republican | Rocky De La Fuente | 187,209 | 11.39% |
| Total votes | | 1,643,396 | 100.0% |

2018 United States Senate election in Florida
| Party | Candidate | Votes | % | ±% |
|---|---|---|---|---|
| Republican | Rick Scott | 4,099,505 | 50.06% | +7.82% |
| Democratic | Bill Nelson (incumbent) | 4,089,472 | 49.93% | −5.30% |
| Write-in | | 607 | <0.01% | N/A |
| Total votes | | 8,190,005 | 100.0% | N/A |
| Republican gain from Democratic | | | | |

2024 United States Senate Election in Florida (Republican primary)
| Party | Candidate | Votes | % |
|---|---|---|---|
| Republican | Rick Scott (incumbent) | 1,283,904 | 84.38% |
| Republican | Keith Gross | 142,392 | 9.36% |
| Republican | John Columbus | 95,342 | 6.26% |
| Total votes | | 1,521,638 | 100.0% |

2024 United States Senate election in Florida
| Party | Candidate | Votes | % | ±% |
|---|---|---|---|---|
| Republican | Rick Scott (incumbent) | 5,977,706 | 55.57% | +5.52% |
| Democratic | Debbie Mucarsel-Powell | 4,603,077 | 42.79% | −7.14% |
| Independent | Ben Everidge | 62,683 | 0.58% | N/A |
| Libertarian | Feena Bonoan | 57,363 | 0.53% | N/A |
| Independent | Tuan TQ Nguyen | 56,586 | 0.53% | N/A |
| Write-in | | 13 | 0.00% | -0.01% |
| Total votes | | 10,757,428 | 100.00% | N/A |
| Republican hold | | | | |

== Awards and honors ==
- Time magazine, America's 25 Most Influential People, June 1996
- Financial World magazine, silver award for the CEO of the Year, 1995
- Columbia University School of Nursing, Second Century Award for Excellence in Health Care (1995)
- Americans for Prosperity, "Pioneers for Prosperity" Award, 2024

== Notes ==
Party political offices
| Preceded by Charlie Crist | Republican nominee for Governor of Florida; 2010, 2014 | Succeeded by Ron DeSantis |
| Preceded by Connie Mack IV | Republican nominee for U.S. Senator from Florida (Class 1); 2018, 2024 | Most recent |
| Preceded by Todd Young | Chair of the National Republican Senatorial Committee; 2021–2023 | Succeeded by Steve Daines |
| Preceded by Mike Lee | Chair of the Senate Republican Steering Committee; 2025–present | Incumbent |
Political offices
| Preceded by Charlie Crist | Governor of Florida; 2011–2019 | Succeeded by Ron DeSantis |
U.S. Senate
| Preceded by Bill Nelson | U.S. Senator (Class 1) from Florida; 2019–present Served alongside: Marco Rubio, Ashley Moody | Incumbent |
| Preceded by Bob Casey Jr. | Chair of the Senate Aging Committee; 2025–present | Incumbent |
U.S. order of precedence (ceremonial)
| Preceded by Josh Hawley | Order of precedence of the United States as United States Senator | Succeeded by Jacky Rosen |
| Preceded by Josh Hawley | United States senators by seniority 68th | Succeeded by Mark Kelly |
