= McGreavy =

McGreavy is a surname. Notable people with the surname include:

- David McGreavy (born 1951), English convicted triple child murderer
- Sara McGreavy-Wills (born 1982), English hurdler

== See also ==
- McReavy
