= Let's Get to Work =

Political action committee in Florida, US

Let's Get to Work!
- Founder: Meredith O'Rourke
- Location: Tallahassee, Florida
- Region served: Florida
- Chairperson: John French
- Treasurer: Abby Dupree
- Website: letsgettowork.net

Let's Get to Work is the independent political action committee funding the 2014 re-election campaign of Florida Governor Rick Scott. In 2014, the organization ran a US$2 million advertising campaign critical of Scott's opponent, Charlie Crist, for raising state college tuition rates during Crist's previous governorship.

As of May 2014, Let's Get to Work has raised $28 million in campaign funding.
