= Tim Jago =

New Zealand sex offender, businessman, and political figure

10th President of ACT New Zealand
- In office 2019–2023
- Leader: David Seymour
- Preceded by: Ruwan Premathilaka
- Succeeded by: Henry Lynch

Personal details
- Born: Timothy Paul Jago; 1966 or 1967 (age 59–60)
- Occupation: Businessman and former surf lifesaver

Timothy Paul Jago (born 1966 or 1967) is a New Zealand convicted sex offender and businessman who was president of political party ACT New Zealand from 2019 to 2023. He was a surf lifesaver and served as chairman of the Muriwai Volunteer Lifeguard Service. In 2024, he was convicted of indecent assault and sentenced to imprisonment.

== Career ==
Jago became involved in surf lifesaving in the 1980s, mostly around the Auckland region. By 1990, he was the operations manager of the Auckland Surf Life Saving Association and oversaw the expansion of lifeguard services to three beaches (Lion Rock, Monkey Rock and Piha) thanks to a $20,000 donation from Fresh Up which paid for extra equipment. In 2003, he was given a Distinguished Service Award by Surf Life Saving New Zealand (SLSNZ). He was also made a life member of SLSNZ. He won the organisation's 'Volunteer of the Year' award in 2012. He also served as the chair of the Muriwai Volunteer Lifeguard Service. In 2013, he was involved in the emergency response after a man was killed by a shark at the beach. In 2015, Jago referred two members of the club to Police after they were alleged to have taken "inappropriate" photos of young members and posted them online. Some time before 2021, Jago stood down from a surf lifesaving related charity—LifeSavers Foundation—during an investigation into the charity's finances.

Jago was chairman of the political party ACT New Zealand for almost four years, before resigning in January 2023 for reasons that, at the time, could not be legally disclosed. It was later revealed that the resignation happened after Jago was charged for indecently assaulting two teenage boys he mentored through a sports club between 1995 and 1999. He was granted name suppression when he was charged so the circumstances surrounding his resignation were not publicly known until after his conviction.

During his time as party president he oversaw an investigation into allegations made by the vice-president of the party’s youth wing, who claimed she had been the victim of sexual harassment. The investigation concluded with the party deciding to take no further action – a decision drawing criticism for dismissal of victims.

== Sexual abuse conviction ==
In November 2022 the ACT party was contacted by the wife of a person alleging that Jago had sexually abused them during the 1990s. The victims were two teenage boys who had been mentored by Jago. Party leader David Seymour provided the contact details for an employment lawyer, but the complainant chose instead to contact Police. Several months later in January 2023 Jago was charged by police, and stepped down as party president a few days later.

Jago was granted name suppression in the lead up to, during, and even after his trial. His lawyers argued this was necessary to prevent the case becoming a political football in the leadup to the 2023 New Zealand general election, which could jeopardise Jago's right to a fair trial. In August 2023 Te Pāti Māori coleader Rawiri Waititi made a direct reference to the case in parliament, asking "Does the Prime Minister agree with a judgment that we've got the leader of ACT chiming in about law and order but is first to get name suppression for his president for heinous crimes?" Despite the case being suppressed from publication by the courts, Waititi's speech was protected by parliamentary privilege. He was later suspended from parliament for breaching standing orders.

Jago's trial began in August 2024. In statements to police in 1999 and 2023, Jago denied any wrongdoing. The crown alleged that Jago had abused a position of trust by providing alcohol to the teenagers and sexually assaulting them while they were intoxicated. One of the complainants told the court he felt he had been "groomed" by Jago. He was found guilty by a jury and convicted of eight counts of indecent assault. He lost name suppression after the conviction, but his name remained secret as he appealed that decision to the High Court.

On 22 November 2024 Jago was sentenced to two-and-a-half years in prison and ordered to pay NZ$1,500 reparations to the victim. Jago had requested to serve his sentence in home detention, but the judge determined that would be inappropriate. Later that afternoon his lawyer argued he should be granted permanent name suppression, but this was declined. However, his lawyer indicated he would appeal this decision, so interim name suppression was continued. One of the victims formally waived his automatic name suppression rights in order to lift name suppression from Jago. Jago had been under interim name suppression for over 667 days at this stage, this being the sixth time it had been granted to him.

Name suppression expired in January 2025 after his lawyer told the court he had chosen to no longer pursue it. In a statement, the ACT party said, "We respect the outcome of the court process and commend the courage of those who have come forward." As of January 2025, Jago still claimed he was innocent and said he intended to appeal the conviction; he filed the appeal in mid-2025 and it was later dismissed.

The earliest Jago was eligible for parole was September 2025, but he was denied parole at first hearing. It was revealed that Jago had prior convictions for drink driving, driving while suspended, and failing to answer to bail. As of October 2025, Jago is serving his sentence on a prison farm.

In August 2025, police revealed they were investigating an additional sexual abuse claim against Jago, and in October he was charged with a further indecent assault dating from 1995. In July 2026 Jago admitted to the additional assault, and 18 months was added to his prison sentence. His lawyer read a letter to the court in which Jago admitted to the offending against all three of his victims, and expressed remorse. As of 600 days after they were ordered, Jago had not paid the reparations which had reduced his original sentence by a month, under a position that it could not be paid because while incarcerated.

In March 2026, Jago was stripped of his awards and life membership by Surf Life Saving New Zealand.

Party political offices
Preceded by Ruwan Premathilaka	President of ACT New Zealand; 2019–2023	Succeeded by Henry Lynch
