= McReavy =

McReavy is a surname. Notable people with the surname include:

- Marilyn McReavy (1944–2023), American volleyball player
- Pat McReavy (1918–2001), Canadian ice hockey player

== See also ==
- McGreavy
