= 2010 Florida gubernatorial election =

- November 2, 2010
- Turnout: 48.7%▲1.9
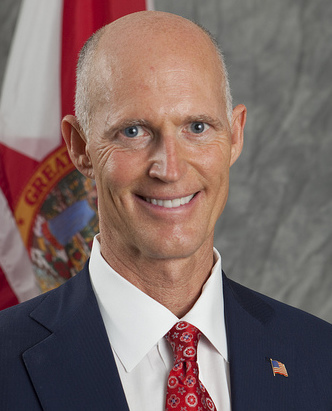

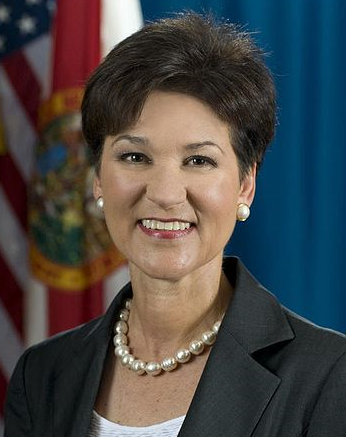
Nominee	Rick Scott	Alex Sink
Party	Republican	Democratic
Running mate	Jennifer Carroll	Rod Smith
Popular vote	2,619,335	2,557,785
Percentage	48.87%	47.72%
- Scott: 40–50% 50–60% 60–70% 70–80% 80–90% >90% Sink: 40–50% 50–60% 60–70% 70–80% 80–90% >90% Tie: 40–50% 50% No votes
Governor before election
Charlie Crist
Independent
Elected Governor
Rick Scott
Republican

The 2010 Florida gubernatorial election took place on November 2, 2010. Republican-turned-independent incumbent Governor Charlie Crist chose not to run for a second term and he ran unsuccessfully for the Senate seat vacated by Mel Martínez. This resulted in an open race for Governor of Florida in which Republican Rick Scott narrowly defeated Democrat Alex Sink.

Despite mixed to unfavorable ratings, Rick Scott benefited greatly from the midterm GOP wave in which Republicans made significant gains across the country. Scott was one of six Republican gubernatorial pick-ups nationwide (counting Crist as an independent).

The tight and highly contentious election was one of the standout races in 2010. Despite not professing direct allegiance to the movement, Scott benefited from support and endorsement by Tea Party activists, an influential conservative voting bloc of the 2010 midterms. Scott ran aggressively against the Affordable Care Act (Obamacare), and exit polls indicated considerable support for that position. This election was the first Florida gubernatorial election since 1982 where the winner of the gubernatorial election was of the same party as the winner of the concurrent United States Senate election.

== Primary Elections ==
=== Democratic ===
==== Candidates ====
- Brian Moore, political activist, 2008 Socialist Party USA nominee for president of the United States
- Alex Sink, chief financial officer of Florida

Before the 2010 Democratic primary, the Florida Democratic Party faced a period of uncertainty. The incumbent governor, Charlie Crist, was widely expected to seek re-election, but surprised many in early 2009 by announcing a run for the U.S. Senate instead. This created a rare open seat for governor, sparking speculation among Florida Democrats about who would enter the race.

Alex Sink, then serving as the chief financial officer of Florida, was the only Democrat holding statewide elected office at the time. As a former Bank of America executive, Sink built a reputation as a competent and moderate technocrat. Her husband, Bill McBride, was the Democratic nominee in the 2002 Florida gubernatorial election, but lost to incumbent Governor Jeb Bush. Initially, there were doubts about whether she would run, as she remained noncommittal throughout the first half of 2009. However, in May 2009, she officially announced her candidacy and instantly became the frontrunner for the Democratic nomination.

Sink benefited from a largely uncontested path to the nomination. Her only opponent was Brian Moore, a long-shot candidate who previously ran for president in 2008 under the Socialist Party USA banner. Moore qualified for the ballot as a Democrat but did not raise significant funds or gain media traction. On primary day, Sink won the Democratic nomination with nearly 77% of the vote.

Because of this advantage, Sink was able to conserve resources and begin preparing for the general election months in advance. She toured the state, built a coalition of moderate Democrats and independents, and began framing her likely Republican opponent (initially expected to be Attorney General Bill McCollum) as out of touch with mainstream voters. However, political newcomer Rick Scott's upset victory surprised her team.

County results

Democratic primary results
Party	Candidate	Votes	%
Democratic	Alex Sink	663,802	76.9%
Democratic	Brian Moore	199,896	23.1%
Total votes		863,698	100.0%

=== Republican ===
In May 2009, incumbent governor Charlie Crist announced he would not run for re-election, and instead would run for U.S. Senate. The move immediately turned the race competitive, as GOP-hopefuls lined up to run for the open seat. Former congressman and Florida Attorney General Bill McCollum emerged as the early favorite and had strong backing from the state Republican establishment. In 2000, McCollum was the Republican nominee for Senate, but lost. He ran for the nomination again in 2004 but lost. His run for governor would be his third attempt at a major statewide campaign. McCollum’s early entry allowed him to consolidate endorsements and donor support, and for most of 2009 and early 2010, he campaigned without a serious challenger. However, just before the deadline, Rick Scott, a multimillionaire businessman and former CEO of the Columbia/HCA hospital chain, jumped into the race.

From the outset, Scott launched a media blitz and invested more than $23 million of his own money in just the primary. In total, Scott spent over $50 million in the primary alone. His messaging focused on job creation, cutting taxes, immigration enforcement, and repealing Obamacare. He branded himself as a “conservative outsider,” tapping into rising Tea Party sentiment and widespread voter frustration with government insiders. His “Let’s Get to Work” plan promised to create 700,000 jobs in seven years.

McCollum was initially caught off-guard by Scott’s entry and struggled to keep up in fundraising and advertising. McCollum tried to reframe the race as a referendum on Scott’s past, especially his role in the Columbia/HCA Medicare fraud case. McCollum’s campaign and allied groups ran ads labeling Scott as untrustworthy. One McCollum ad called Scott “the king of Medicare fraud,” a claim Scott strongly rejected, stating he was never personally charged with wrongdoing.

The race turned deeply negative on both sides, with mutual accusations of lying, criminal behavior, and ideological extremism. McCollum also received criticism for hiring a controversial anti-immigration consultant, which alienated some moderate Republicans and Latino voters. Scott took legal action to avoid Florida’s campaign finance “millionaire’s matching funds” provision, which would have granted McCollum more public funding. Televised debates late in the campaign were bitter and personal, with Scott refusing to apologize for his business record and McCollum attacking Scott’s refusal to release full records from his tenure at Columbia/HCA.

Scott led some early polls, but McCollum re-took the lead in polls just before primary day. Scott benefited in absentee voting, while McCollum expected to make up the difference based on turnout. On primary day, Scott won the nomination with just over 46% of the vote. The dejected McCollum team reluctantly conceded after midnight. Scott's victory exposed rifts within the Republican Party between establishment conservatives and the insurgent Tea Party movement. The primary left Scott with high unfavorable ratings and a reputation for aggressive, negative campaigning, but it also gave him name recognition, media dominance, and momentum heading into the general election.

County results

Republican primary results
Party	Candidate	Votes	%
Republican	Rick Scott	595,474	46.4%
Republican	Bill McCollum	557,427	43.4%
Republican	Mike McCalister	130,056	10.1%
Total votes		1,282,957	100.0%

== General Election ==
=== Candidates ===
==== Republican ====
- Rick Scott, healthcare executive

==== Democratic ====
- Alex Sink, chief financial officer of Florida

==== Independence Party of Florida ====
- Peter L. Allen, electrical inspector

==== No party affiliation ====
- Michael E. Arth, policy analyst and urban designer who entered the race as a Democrat in June 2009 and later switched to no party affiliation in June 2010
- Daniel Imperato
- Farid Khavari, economist, author, and small business owner
- Calvin Clarence "C.C." Reed

=== Campaign ===
The race was dominated by the two major party candidates and spending on their behalf. By the October 25, 2010, Tampa debate between Scott and Sink, Scott had spent $60 million of his own money on the campaign compared to Sink's $28 million. Total campaign expenditure for the race exceeded $100 million, far exceeding any previous spending for a governor's race in Florida. Scott spent $78 million of his personal wealth in the race. Sink made an issue of Scott's connections to Columbia/HCA, a Medicare billing fraud scandal.

One of the turning points in the campaign came during the debate. During a commercial break, Sink's make-up artist delivered a text message on her cell phone to Sink, in direct violation of the debate rules. The rules infraction was immediately pointed out by Scott and the debate moderators. Sink's team was accused of cheating during the debate, and the aide who delivered the message was fired from the campaign the next morning. Afterwards, media and observers were very critical of the gaffe.

=== Predictions ===
Source	Ranking	As of
Cook Political Report	Tossup	October 14, 2010
Rothenberg	Tossup	October 28, 2010
RealClearPolitics	Tossup	November 1, 2010
Sabato's Crystal Ball	Lean R (flip)	October 28, 2010
CQ Politics	Tossup	October 28, 2010

=== Polling ===
==== Democratic primary ====
List of Democratic primary polling numbers

Poll source	Dates administered	Alex Sink	Michael E. Arth
Mason Dixon	June 24–26, 2009	49%	4%

==== Republican primary ====
View source data.
List of Republican primary polling numbers

Poll source	Dates administered	Bill McCollum	Rick Scott	Paula Dockery
Quinnipiac	August 21–22, 2010	39%	35%	–
Public Policy Polling	August 21–22, 2010	40%	47%	–
Mason-Dixon	August 17–19, 2010	45%	36%	–
Quinnipiac	August 11–16, 2010	44%	35%	–
Sunshine State News	August 12–15, 2010	42%	44%	–
Mason Dixon	August 9–11, 2010	34%	30%	–
Ipsos/Florida Newspapers	August 6–10, 2010	32%	42%	–
Mason Dixon	August 2–4, 2010	31%	37%	–
The Florida Poll	July 24–28, 2010	25%	41%	–
Quinnipiac	July 22–27, 2010	32%	43%	–
Public Policy Polling	July 16–18, 2010	29%	43%	–
Florida Chamber of Commerce	June 9–13, 2010	30%	35%	–
Quinnipiac	June 2–8, 2010	31%	44%	–
Mason-Dixon	May 3–5, 2010	38%	24%	7%
Research 2000	November 16–18, 2009	45%	–	9%
Strategic Vision	May 29–31, 2009	44%	–	28%

==== General election ====
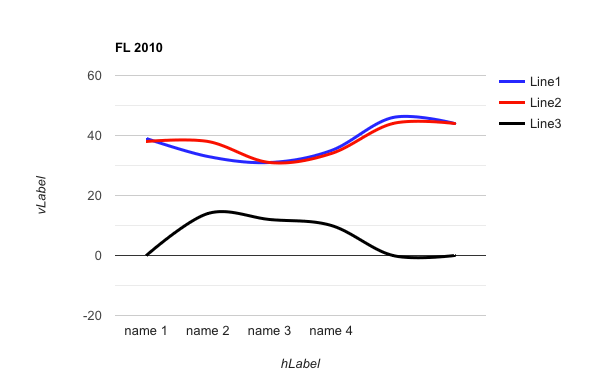
Polling for the 2010 Florida gubernatorial election

Poll source	Dates administered	Bud Chiles (I)	Rick Scott (R)	Alex Sink (D)
Mason-Dixon	May 3–5, 2010	—	36%	38%
Rasmussen Reports	May 16, 2010	—	41%	40%
Rasmussen Reports	June 7, 2010	—	45%	40%
Quinnipiac	June 7, 2010	13%	35%	26%
Florida Chamber of Commerce	June 9–13, 2010	15%	31%	26%
Ipsos/Reuters	July 9–11, 2010	12%	34%	31%
Public Policy Polling	July 16–18, 2010	13%	30%	36%
Quinnipiac	July 22–27, 2010	14%	29%	27%
The Florida Poll	July 24–28, 2010	11%	30%	28%
Rasmussen Reports	August 2, 2010	16%	35%	31%
Ipsos/Florida Newspapers	August 6–10, 2010	14%	30%	29%
Mason-Dixon	August 9–11, 2010	17%	24%	40%
Quinnipiac	August 11–16, 2010	12%	29%	33%
Public Policy Polling	August 21–22, 2010	8%	34%	41%
Rasmussen Reports	August 25, 2010	4%	45%	42%
Rasmussen Reports	September 1, 2010	—	45%	44%
Sunshine State News	September 1–7, 2010	—	42%	44%
CNN	September 2–7, 2010	—	42%	49%
FOX News	September 11, 2010	—	41%	49%
Reuters/Ipsos	September 12, 2010	—	45%	47%
Mason-Dixon	September 20–22, 2010	—	40%	47%
Rasmussen Reports	September 22, 2010	—	50%	44%
Quinnipiac	September 23–28, 2010	—	49%	43%
CNN	September 24–28, 2010	—	47%	45%
Sunshine State News	September 26 – October 3, 2010	—	44%	42%
TCPalm.com /Zogby	September 27–29, 2010	—	39%	41%
Florida Chamber of Commerce	September 27–30, 2010	—	46%	42%
Rasmussen Reports	September 30, 2010	—	46%	41%
Mason-Dixon	October 4–6, 2010	—	40%	44%
Miami-Dade College	October 5, 2010	—	52%	46%
Quinnipiac	October 6–8, 2010	—	45%	44%
Rasmussen Reports	October 7, 2010	—	50%	47%
PPP	October 9–10, 2010	—	41%	46%
Susquehanna	October 12–13, 2010	—	45%	48%
Suffolk	October 14–17, 2010	—	38%	45%
CNN Opinion Research	October 15–19, 2010	—	49%	46%
Ipsos/St. Pete Times	October 15–19, 2010	—	44%	41%
Rasmussen Reports	October 18, 2010	—	50%	44%
Naples Daily News /Zogby	October 18–21, 2010	—	39%	43%
Quinnipiac	October 18–24, 2010	—	41%	45%
Susquehanna	October 20, 2010	—	45%	45%
Susquehanna/Sunshine State News	October 24–25, 2010	—	47%	45%
Univ. of South Fla. Polytechnic	October 23–27, 2010	—	44%	39%
Quinnipiac	October 25–31, 2010	—	43%	44%
Mason-Dixon	October 26–27, 2010	—	43%	46%
Rasmussen Reports	October 27, 2010	—	48%	45%
Susquehanna/Sunshine State	October 29–31, 2010	—	46%	49%
Public Policy Polling	October 30–31, 2010	—	47%	48%

==== Hypothetical polls ====
Bill McCollum (R) vs. Alex Sink (D) vs. Bud Chiles (I)
View source data.

Poll source	Dates administered	Bill McCollum	Alex Sink	Bud Chiles
Quinnipiac	August 11–16, 2010	29%	31%	12%
Mason-Dixon	August 9–11, 2010	35%	37%	13%
Ipsos/Florida Newspapers	August 6–10, 2010	26%	30%	12%
Rasmussen Reports	August 2, 2010	27%	31%	20%
The Florida Poll	July 24–28, 2010	26%	27%	12%
Quinnipiac	July 22–27, 2010	27%	26%	14%
Public Policy Polling	July 16–18, 2010	23%	37%	14%
Ipsos/Reuters	July 9–11, 2010	30%	31%	12%
Florida Chamber of Commerce	June 9–13, 2010	30%	26%	15%
Quinnipiac	June 7, 2010	33%	25%	19%
Rasmussen Reports	June 7, 2010	40%	38%	—
Rasmussen Reports	May 16, 2010	43%	35%	—
Mason-Dixon	May 7, 2010	45%	36%	—
Rasmussen Reports	March 18, 2010	47%	36%	—
Public Policy Polling	March 5–8, 2010	44%	31%	—
Rasmussen Reports	February 18, 2010	48%	35%	—
Fabrizo/McLaughlin & Associates	January 31, 2010	41%	32%	—
Rasmussen Reports	January 27, 2010	46%	35%	—
Quinnipiac	January 27, 2010	41%	31%	<1%
Rasmussen Reports	December 14, 2009	44%	39%	—
Research 2000	November 16–18, 2009	35%	33%	—
St. Pete Times/Miami Herald/Bay News 9	October 25–28, 2009	37%	38%	—
Rasmussen Reports	October 20, 2009	46%	35%	—
Quinnipiac	August 19, 2009	38%	34%	1%
Public Opinion Strategies	August 4–5, 2009	48%	37%	—
Rasmussen Reports	June 22, 2009	42%	34%	—
Quinnipiac	June 2–7, 2009	34%	38%	1%
Mason Dixon	May 14–18, 2009	40%	34%	—
Mason Dixon	March 30 – April 1, 2009	36%	35%	—

=== Results ===
State senate results

The 2010 governor's race was one of Florida's closest, decided by just over 60,000 votes. Unlike the concurrent Senate race, the governor's race remained in doubt late into the night. When polls closed, Scott had a lead, but as the night progressed, the margin narrowed. The next day, with over 99% of precincts reporting, Scott maintained about a 1% lead in the raw vote. Despite a small number of still-uncounted ballots from Palm Beach County, Sink's chances of winning were negligible, as Scott was still ahead by over 50,000 – much more than the 3,000 uncounted ballots, and more importantly, still above the threshold of 0.5% to trigger a mandatory recount. Sink conceded the day after the election.

Exit polls showed that Scott won among independents and the two candidates split the Hispanic vote.

2010 Florida gubernatorial election
Party	Candidate	Votes	%	±%
Republican	Rick Scott	2,619,335	48.87%	−3.31%
Democratic	Alex Sink	2,557,785	47.72%	+2.62%
Independence	Peter Allen	123,831	2.31%	
Independent	C. C. Reed	18,842	0.35%	
Independent	Michael E. Arth	18,644	0.35%	
Independent	Daniel Imperato	13,690	0.26%	
Independent	Farid Khavari	7,487	0.14%	
Write-ins		121	0.00%	
Plurality		61,550	1.15%	-5.92%
Turnout		5,359,735		
Republican gain from Independent		Swing		

==== Counties that flipped from Republican to Democratic ====
- Franklin (largest city: Eastpoint)
- Liberty (largest city: Bristol)
- Hillsborough (largest municipality: Tampa)
- Osceola (largest municipality: Kissimmee)
- Pinellas (largest municipality: St. Petersburg)
- St. Lucie (largest city: Port St. Lucie)
- Orange (largest city: Orlando)

== See also ==
- List of governors of Florida
- 2010 United States gubernatorial elections
