= Physician gag law =

In the United States, a physician gag law is a law that prohibits physicians from asking their patients about whether the patient owns a gun. In some cases, these laws may also restrict the ability of physicians to counsel their patients about gun safety. The term was first used to describe the "Firearm Owners' Privacy Act," a law that was supported by the National Rifle Association and passed in Florida in 2011, which prohibited doctors from “making written inquiry or asking questions concerning the ownership of a firearm or ammunition by the patient or by a family member of the patient.” The law passed in Florida was later challenged by the American Academy of Pediatrics, and was blocked in 2012 when judge Marcia G. Cooke, of the United States District Court for the Southern District of Florida, issued an injunction against its implementation. In 2014, Cooke's decision was reversed by a three judge panel of the 11th Circuit Court of Appeals, which ruled to uphold the law. The plaintiffs petitioned the court to be heard by the full panel of judges. In 2017, the court found the law to violate physicians' 1st Amendment Rights. Since 2011, twelve other states besides Florida have introduced similar laws, and although Florida's was the most restrictive in the country, similar (albeit watered-down) laws have been enacted in Minnesota, Missouri and Montana.

== Reactions ==
A 2012 "sounding board" article in The New England Journal of Medicine criticized Florida's gag law for the same reason Cooke issued an injunction against it, which is that, as Cooke said, “The State, through this law, inserts itself in the doctor–patient relationship, prohibiting and burdening speech necessary to the proper practice of preventive medicine, thereby preventing patients from receiving truthful, non-misleading information." Medical organizations that are opposed to these laws include the American Medical Association, as well as the American Academy of Family Physicians, American Academy of Pediatrics, American College of Emergency Physicians, American Congress of Obstetricians and Gynecologists, American College of Physicians, American College of Surgeons, American Psychiatric Association, and the American Public Health Association. These eight organizations (not including the AMA) released a joint statement in 2015 which stated that "our organizations oppose state and federal mandates that interfere with physician free speech and the patient–physician relationship, including laws that forbid physicians to discuss a patient's gun ownership."
