= Firearm Owners' Privacy Act =

The Firearm Owners' Privacy Act (often abbreviated FOPA) is a law passed by the Florida Legislature in 2011 in response to concerns raised by Floridians whose physicians asked them about gun ownership. The law banned doctors in the state from asking their patients about guns, and from entering information about guns into patients' medical records. However, doctors are allowed to do both of these things under the law provided they believe it is relevant to the medical care or safety of their patients or the safety of others. The law also prevents physicians from denying care to patients if they do not answer questions about guns. Soon after the law was signed by Governor Rick Scott on June 2, 2011, several physicians and physician organizations filed a lawsuit in federal court challenging it.

== Court rulings ==
On June 29, 2012, United States District Court for the Southern District of Florida judge Marcia G. Cooke issued a permanent injunction against FOPA on the basis that it unduly burdened physicians' right to free speech. Governor Scott responded by filing an appeal of Cooke's ruling, which sent the case to the United States Court of Appeals for the Eleventh Circuit. In 2014, in Wollschlaeger v. Governor of Florida, a three-judge panel on the Eleventh Circuit reversed Cooke's injunction; the author of the ruling wrote that "the practice of good medicine does not require interrogation about irrelevant, private matters." In July 2015, a majority of Eleventh Circuit judges voted to re-hear Wollschlaeger v. Governor of Florida; on June 21, 2016, the Circuit heard arguments in the case.

On February 16, 2017, the en banc Eleventh Circuit, issuing two majority opinions, ruled that three of the law's four provisions—the anti-harassment, record-keeping, and inquiry provisions—violate the First Amendment. The court further interpreted one provision of the law, barring physician discrimination against patients who own guns, not to regulate speech, upholding the provision on that basis.
