= Stephanie Hallowich, H/W, v. Range Resources Corporation =

Stephanie Hallowich and Chris Hallowich, H/W, v. Range Resources Corporation, Williams Gas/Laurel Mountain Midstream, MarkWest Energy Partners, L.P., MarkWest Energy Group, L.L.C., and Pennsylvania Department of Environmental Protection was a case in the Court of Common Pleas of Washington County, Pennsylvania (Civil Division). The trial was held in August 2011.

Chris Hallowich (Born), and his wife Stephanie Hallowich, operated a farm in Mount Pleasant, Pennsylvania. They sued Range Resources Corporation, Williams Gas/Laurel Mountain Midstream, MarkWest Energy, and the Pennsylvania Department of Environmental Protection for compensation for "health and environmental impacts" from "natural gas development operations".

In the settlement, the plaintiffs received $750,000 from the sale of their home for the purchase of a home elsewhere, but were required to abstain, along with their two minor children, from ever again discussing hydraulic fracturing or Marcellus Shale. The filed Washington County court documents in the case show that the Hallowich family was represented by Peter M. Villari, Esq. and Robert N. Wilkey, Esq. of Villari, Brandes, Kline, P.C., a litigation firm located in Conshohocken, Pennsylvania. The case received significant international notoriety concerning the issue of First Amendment rights as it relates to confidential settlement agreements, gag-orders, and the constitutional rights of minors within the scope of the natural gas drilling industry, operations, and civil litigation. On March 20, 2011, Judge Debbie O'Dell-Senaca, issued an Order and Opinion, reversing a prior trial court's order to seal the settlement documents, and ordering that the Court record, including the settlement documents be unsealed. Many of the Defendants in the case subsequently appealed, seeking to keep the settlement documents sealed. Eventually, the settlement documents in the Hallowich case were restored and made publicly available.
