= The Cover-up General =

Non-fiction thriller by Edwin F. Giltay

- First edition cover
- Author: Edwin F. Giltay
- Original title: De doofpotgeneraal
- Language: Dutch
- Subject: Military intelligence
- Genre: Non-fiction thriller
- Set in: Delft and The Hague
- Published: 1st edition: 26 Nov 2014; (censored: 14 Dec 2015); (book ban lifted: 12 Apr 2016); 2nd edition: 16 Sep 2016
- Publisher: SpeakEasy Publisher & Agency, De Blauwe Tijger
- Publication place: The Netherlands
- Media type: Print (paperback)
- Pages: 263 (2nd edition)
- ISBN: 978-94-92161-21-5
- OCLC: 960019892

The Cover-up General is a non-fiction thriller by Dutch author Edwin F. Giltay, first published in 2014. The book describes an espionage scandal he witnessed first-hand, within military intelligence of the Armed forces of the Netherlands. At the root of it all was the infamous Srebrenica Massacre depicting war crimes, which was misdeveloped by a navy photo laboratory.

== Publication prohibited ==
A year after its publication, a former secret service agent filed a lawsuit against the author. She claimed she was depicted unjustly in the publication and demanded it to be censored. Subsequently, the book was banned by a district court. Giltay was also prohibited to talk about the contents of The Cover-up General in public.

== Book ban overturned ==
In 2016 however, the book ban was overturned by the Court of Appeal in The Hague. It ruled the accuracy of the publication is not in doubt and affirmed its importance for the public debate on the Srebrenica drama. The Dutch Ministry of Defence, which had expressed doubts regarding the book’s contents, refrained from commenting on the verdict.

== Extended edition ==
An extended edition of The Cover-up General was published later that same year. In their lawsuit against the Netherlands, the Mothers of Srebrenica use the book as supporting evidence. It backs their notion of the Dutch military obscuring proof regarding the 1995 genocide, whose aftermath still leaves questions unanswered.

== Press freedom ==
The banning of The Cover-up General was rather unique, as books are hardly ever prohibited in The Netherlands. This restriction on freedom of the press was condemned by journalists and politicians alike. Despite extensive media coverage and Parliamentary questions, many elements raised in the book have yet to be addressed.
