= Independence Party of Florida =

Political party

The Independence Party of Florida was a minor political party in the state of Florida in the United States. It was established in 1999 by Peter Allen, a businessman from Riverview, Florida. Allen subsequently ran for governor of Florida as his party's nominee in 2010, by which point the party's membership had grown to include over 65,000 Floridians. According to the Orlando Sentinel, Allen ran for governor "on a pro-Constitution, anti-special-interests platform"; he received 123,831 votes in the general election, representing 2.3% of all votes cast. The party was shut down by the state of Florida in 2017. It was often confused with the Independent Party of Florida.
