= David McGreavy =

English murderer

- McGreavy in the 1970s
- Born: David Anthony McGreavy; 1951 (age 74–75); Southport, Lancashire, England
- Other names: "The Monster of Worcester", "The Real Friday the 13th Killer"
- Status: Paroled
- Conviction: Murder (3 counts)
- Penalty: Life imprisonment (minimum of 20 years)

Details
- Victims: 3
- Date: 13 April 1973
- Location: Worcester, England

David Anthony McGreavy (born 1951), also known as The Monster of Worcester or The Real Friday the 13th Killer, is an English convicted triple murderer who killed and dismembered his friend's three children in 1973. He was in the news in 2013 when an anonymity order imposed in 2009 was lifted based on findings that there was a public interest in his application for parole and that there was no immediate danger to his life. He was held in a vulnerable prisoners' unit, where he spent most of his 40 years in prison until he was released on parole in December 2018.

== Early life ==
David Anthony McGreavy was born in 1951 in Southport, Lancashire, to Thomas and Bella McGreavy, the second of six children. His father was a sergeant in the British Army, and the family moved frequently between different Army posts. In 1967, David McGreavy left school and joined the Royal Navy, in which he hoped to make a career. However, he was dismissed from the Navy in August 1971 after being court-martialled for starting a fire that destroyed a mess wardroom. McGreavy then moved back in with his parents in Worcestershire. His fiancée broke up with him, and he was sacked from several jobs. Fed up with his lack of work and heavy drinking, his parents forced him to move out.

== Ralph family ==
In 1972, unable to live with his parents, McGreavy began boarding with his friend, Clive Kenneth Ralph, his wife, Dorothy Elsie (née Clay), and their two small children, Paul Kenneth (born 20 November 1968) and Dawn Maria (born 25 April 1971). Clive and Elsie had been school friends, and there was a five-year age difference between them; they had married in September 1968, when Elsie was 16 and pregnant with Paul. They lived on Gillam Street in the Rainbow Hill district of Worcester, England. At the time McGreavy moved in, Elsie was pregnant with the Ralphs' third child, Samantha Jane, who was born on 14 July 1972.

Elsie Ralph (who later remarried and has gone by the names "Elsie Urry" or "Dorothy Urry") recalled in a television interview many years later that McGreavy held a factory job. He paid £6 per week in rent and sometimes cooked Sunday dinner. Although newspapers reported in 1973 that McGreavy and Elsie had had an affair, Elsie has denied this.

Clive Ralph worked for his father as a lorry driver. When baby Samantha was about 7 months old, Elsie became a barmaid at The Punchbowl pub on Ronkswood estate in Worcester, about 2 miles (3.2 km) from the Ralph home. With both Clive and Elsie now busy working, McGreavy acted as babysitter for the Ralph children. At that time, McGreavy's family and neighbours, as well as the Ralphs, knew him as a person who loved children, including the Ralph children. According to Elsie, he would frequently play with her children and acted "like a father" to them, going so far as to chastise her over her discipline of Paul.

== Murders ==
On Friday, 13 April 1973, Elsie Ralph was picked up from work by Clive, who had left home late, with the children all asleep. Clive would usually pick her up late to help her close and have a last pint. When the Ralphs arrived home, they discovered the children and McGreavy missing. They also saw what appeared to be blood spattering on walls and the home in disarray. They drove to the Worcester Police Station and reported what they had discovered. Police responded to the home and commenced a search of the home and area. The three children’s bodies were discovered within the hour during a canine sweep of the rear gardens. The Ralphs were told of the gruesome discovery at the police station where they had remained during the initial police response and search.

McGreavy, who was known to be a habitual drinker with a violent temper when inebriated, had gone to the nearby Vauxhall pub on Astwood Road (now Balti Mahal curryhouse) earlier that evening with a friend, where he drank five to seven imperial pints (2.8 to 4.0 L) of beer. The two men had played cards and darts, though a small altercation took place prior to leaving the pub, after McGreavy had put a cigarette out in his friend's beer. Clive had picked McGreavy up from the Vauxhall and brought him home to look after the children while Clive went to get Elsie from work.

Some time between 10:15 and 11:15 pm, a drunk McGreavy became infuriated with the Ralph children, beginning with the baby, Samantha, who had been crying for her bottle. McGreavy violently killed Samantha and then the other two children, each in a different manner. Eight-month-old Samantha died from a skull fracture, 2-year-old Dawn had her throat slit, and 4-year-old Paul was strangled. After killing the three children, McGreavy went down to the basement and retrieved a pickaxe. He further mutilated their bodies with the pickaxe before impaling the three bodies on the spikes of a wrought iron fence in a neighbour's yard. He then left the home.

McGreavy was arrested by police at 3:50 am while walking on Ombersley Rd, approximately 2 miles from the home, trying to hitch a ride out of town. Upon his arrest, McGreavy reportedly said, "What's this all about?" At first, McGreavy denied any responsibility, but several hours later said, "It was me, but it wasn’t me," after which he described in graphic detail what he had done. He told police, "I put my hand over her (Samantha's) mouth, and it went from there. It's all in the house. On Paul, I used a wire. I was going to bury him, but I couldn't. I went outside, and put them on the fence. All I could hear is kids, kids, kids." McGreavy's only explanation for the murders was that the baby would not stop crying.

On 28 June 1973, McGreavy appeared in court and pleaded guilty to the murders of all three Ralph children. The hearing lasted only eight minutes because McGreavy pleaded guilty and there was no defence plea, no motive, and no case of diminished responsibility.

== Prison ==
McGreavy was sentenced to multiple life terms with minimums of 20 years. In prison he was subjected to frequent abuse by other prisoners and spent most of his 45 years behind bars in protected conditions. He was reported to have successfully adjusted, accepted rehabilitation and engaged in painting.

== Publicity and 2009 anonymity order ==
Due to the brutality of the crime, McGreavy became known as the "Monster of Worcester" and was the subject of substantial press coverage at the time of the crime. Former editor of the Sunday Mirror Paul Connew was a reporter at the time and had covered the story. Connew has opined that although people remembered the crime, the name of David McGreavy was not well remembered because of the lack of a lengthy court proceeding with the accompanying coverage.

In 2006, McGreavy again became headline news after he was transferred to an open prison and allowed to stay in a bail hostel in Liverpool. The Sun newspaper discovered and publicised this arrangement, featuring a front-page photo of McGreavy (released on temporary licence) walking on a Liverpool street, which resulted in McGreavy's transfer back to a closed prison.

In 2009, an anonymity order was issued by the High Court of Justice during McGreavy's parole board proceedings. The order was resisted by the British press and the Press Association, supported by the Secretary of State for Justice, who argued that setting such a precedent would prevent coverage of dangerous criminals. The order was lifted on 21 May 2013 by Lord Justice Pitchford of the Court of Appeal of England and Wales and Mr Justice Simon of the High Court of Justice, based on the importance of the public interest in possible release of a dangerous criminal and lack of imminent danger to McGreavy. The lifting of the anonymity order brought a fresh round of publicity to the 40-year-old case.

== Release ==
In December 2018, following a parole hearing, the report said he had "changed considerably" over the last 45 years and legally cleared him for release on parole.
