= 2014 Florida gubernatorial election =

- November 4, 2014
- Turnout: 50.5%▲1.8
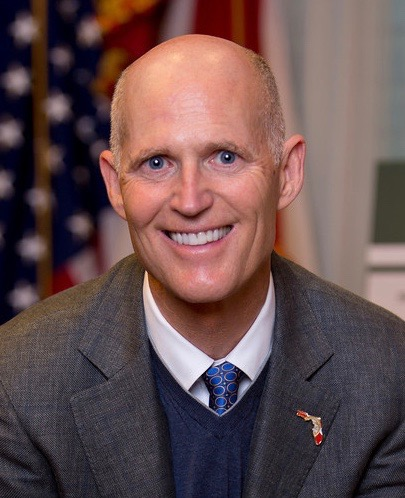

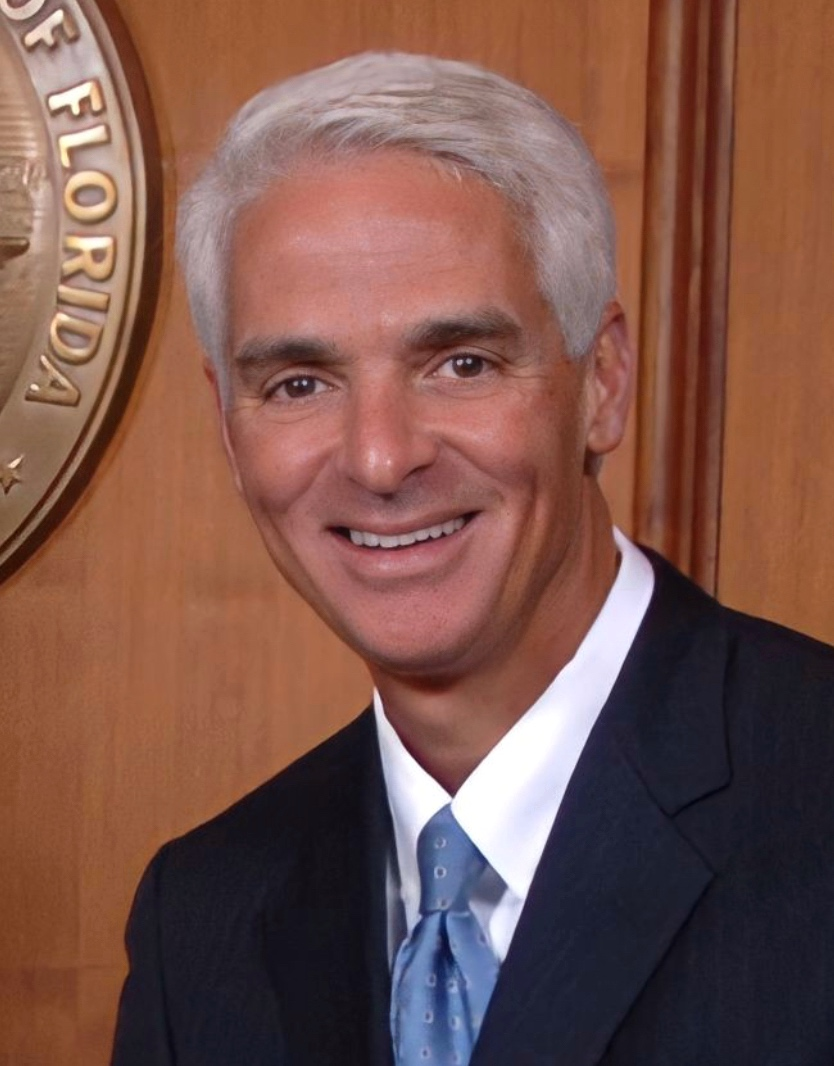
Nominee	Rick Scott	Charlie Crist
Party	Republican	Democratic
Running mate	Carlos Lopez-Cantera	Annette Taddeo
Popular vote	2,865,343	2,801,198
Percentage	48.14%	47.07%
- Scott: 40–50% 50–60% 60–70% 70–80% Crist: 40–50% 50–60% 60–70% 70–80% 80–90%
Governor before election
Rick Scott
Republican
Elected Governor
Rick Scott
Republican

The 2014 Florida gubernatorial election took place on November 4, 2014, to elect the Governor and Lieutenant Governor of Florida.

The incumbent Republican, Rick Scott, ran for reelection. The Democratic nominee was former Governor Charlie Crist, who was Scott's direct predecessor. Crist was elected governor as a Republican in 2006 but did not run for re-election in 2010, instead opting to run for Senate as an independent. Libertarian nominee Adrian Wyllie and several candidates with no party affiliation also ran. Political pundits considered the race a toss-up. This was one of nine Republican-held governorships up for election in a state that Barack Obama won in the 2012 presidential election.

On Election Day, Scott defeated Crist, earning 48% of the vote. With a margin of 1%, this election was the closest race of the 2014 gubernatorial election cycle.

== Republican primary ==
=== Candidates ===
==== Nominee ====
- Rick Scott, incumbent governor

==== Eliminated in primary ====
- Yinka Adeshina, pharmacist
- Elizabeth Cuevas-Neunder, conservative activist and candidate for governor in 1998

==== Withdrew ====
- Timothy Devine

==== Declined ====
- Jeff Atwater, chief financial officer of Florida (running for re-election)
- Pam Bondi, Florida attorney general (running for re-election)
- Bill McCollum, former Florida attorney general and candidate for governor in 2010
- Adam Putnam, Florida commissioner of agriculture (running for re-election)
- John E. Thrasher, state senator
- Will Weatherford, speaker of the Florida House of Representatives
- Allen West, former U.S. representative

=== Endorsements ===
Rick Scott

Elected officials

- Aaron Bean, state senator
- Jeb Bush, former governor of Florida
- Bill McCollum, former attorney general of Florida and candidate for governor in 2010
- John E. Thrasher, state senator

Organizations

- Associated Builders and Contractors of Florida
- Florida Medical Association
- Florida Police Chiefs Association
- Florida Restaurant and Lodging Association
- Florida Retail Federation
- JAXChamber
- National Federation of Independent Business

Newspapers

- Tampa Bay Times
- Tampa Tribune

=== Polling ===
Poll source	Date(s) administered	Sample size	Margin of error	Rick Scott	Someone else	Other	Undecided
Public Policy Polling	March 15–18, 2013	326	± 5.4%	42%	43%	—	14%
Public Policy Polling	January 11–13, 2013	436	± 4.7%	50%	40%	—	10%
Quinnipiac	December 11–17, 2012	1,261	± 2.8%	30%	53%	—	16%
Public Policy Polling	September 22–25, 2011	472	± 4.5%	53%	37%	—	10%

Hypothetical polling

Poll source	Date(s) administered	Sample size	Margin of error	Rick Scott	Pam Bondi	Other	Undecided
Hamilton Strategies	January 30 – February 4, 2013	?	± ?	54%	21%	—	25%
Public Policy Polling	March 15–18, 2013	326	± 5.4%	46%	27%	—	27%
Public Policy Polling	January 11–13, 2013	436	± 4.7%	49%	25%	—	26%

Poll source	Date(s) administered	Sample size	Margin of error	Rick Scott	Adam Putnam	Other	Undecided
Public Policy Polling	March 15–18, 2013	326	± 5.4%	48%	24%	—	28%
Quinnipiac	March 13–18, 2013	353	± 5.2%	47%	24%	2%	27%

Poll source	Date(s) administered	Sample size	Margin of error	Rick Scott	Tim Tebow	Other	Undecided
Public Policy Polling	January 14–16, 2012	572	± 4.1%	47%	26%	—	27%

Poll source	Date(s) administered	Sample size	Margin of error	Rick Scott	Allen West	Other	Undecided
Public Policy Polling	January 11–13, 2013	436	± 4.7%	37%	38%	—	25%

Poll source	Date(s) administered	Sample size	Margin of error	Rick Scott	Ted Yoho	Other	Undecided
Public Policy Polling	March 15–18, 2013	326	± 5.4%	54%	13%	—	32%

=== Results ===
Results by county Scott: Scott—80–90%; Scott—>90%

Republican primary results
Party	Candidate	Votes	%
Republican	Rick Scott (incumbent)	831,887	87.65%
Republican	Elizabeth Cuevas-Neunder	100,496	10.59%
Republican	Yinka Adeshina	16,761	1.77%
Total votes		949,144	100%

== Democratic primary ==
In April 2010, and while still in office as governor of Florida, Charlie Crist left the Republican Party to run for U.S. Senate as an independent. He was defeated in the general election by Republican nominee Marco Rubio. In December 2012, Crist joined the Democratic Party.

=== Candidates ===
==== Declared ====
- Charlie Crist, former Republican turned Independent governor and independent candidate for the U.S. Senate in 2010
- Nan Rich, former minority leader of the Florida Senate

==== Withdrew ====
- Farid Khavari, economist, author and Independent candidate for governor in 2010 (running as an independent)

==== Declined ====
- Bob Buckhorn, mayor of Tampa and former Tampa city councilman
- Manny Diaz, former mayor of Miami
- Buddy Dyer, mayor of Orlando, former minority leader of the Florida Senate and nominee for Florida attorney general in 2002
- Dan Gelber, former minority leader of the Florida House of Representatives, former state senator and nominee for Florida attorney general in 2010
- Pam Iorio, former mayor of Tampa, former Hillsborough County supervisor of elections and former Hillsborough County commissioner
- Bill Nelson, U.S. senator
- Jeremy Ring, state senator
- Alex Sink, former chief financial officer of Florida, nominee for governor in 2010 and nominee for Florida's 13th congressional district in 2014
- Rod Smith, former chairman of the Florida Democratic Party, former state senator and nominee for lieutenant governor in 2010
- Debbie Wasserman Schultz, U.S. representative and chair of the Democratic National Committee

=== Endorsements ===
Charlie Crist

Elected officials

- Bob Butterworth, former Florida attorney general
- Kathy Castor, U.S. representative
- Dan Gelber, former state senator and nominee for attorney general in 2010

Organizations

- American Federation of State, County and Municipal Employees
- Equality Florida
- Florida AFL–CIO
- Florida Education Association
- Florida Pipe Trades Council
- Human Rights Campaign
- Florida Police Benevolent Association

Newspapers

- La Gaceta
- The Miami Herald
- Sun-Sentinel
- Tampa Bay Times
- Tampa Tribune
Nan Rich

Elected officials

- Dwight Bullard, state senator
- Katie Edwards, state representative
- Maurice Ferré, former mayor of Miami
- Arthenia Joyner, state senator
- Martin Kiar, Broward County commissioner and former state representative
- Buddy MacKay, former governor of Florida
- Rick Stark, state representative

Organizations

- Democracy for America Palm Beach County
- National Organization for Women
- National Women's Political Caucus

Newspapers

- El Nuevo Herald

=== Polling ===
Poll source	Date(s) administered	Sample size	Margin of error	Charlie Crist	Buddy Dyer	Dan Gelber	Pam Iorio	Anthony Shriver Kennedy	Jimmy Morales	Bill Nelson	Nan Rich	Alex Sink	Rod Smith	Other	Unde- cided
Public Policy Polling	January 16–21, 2014	243	± 6.3%	58%	—	—	—	—	—	—	16%	—	—	—	25%
Fabrizio McLaughlin	November 24–26, 2013	380	± ?	45%	—	—	—	—	—	32%	4%	—	—	—	19%
Quinnipiac	November 12–17, 2013	1,646	± 2.4%	60%	—	—	—	—	—	—	12%	—	—	2%	26%
Public Policy Polling	September 27–29, 2013	337	± ?	59%	—	—	—	—	—	—	16%	—	—	—	25%
Public Policy Polling	March 15–18, 2013	500	± 5.4%	50%	—	—	9%	—	—	—	3%	21%	—	—	16%
Hamilton Strategies	Jan. 30 – February 4, 2013	600	± 4%	43%	—	—	—	—	—	—	1%	14%	—	5%	37%
Public Policy Polling	January 11–13, 2013	401	± 4.9%	52%	4%	—	13%	—	—	—	1%	18%	—	—	12%
SEA Polling	September 2012	600	± 4%	29%	—	3%	—	8%	2%	—	1%	31%	—	—	26%
St. Pete Polls	September 8, 2012	1,689	± 2.4%	60.9%	7%	—	—	—	—	—	3.5%	25.1%	3.4%	—	—

=== Results ===
Results by county Crist: Crist—50–60%; Crist—60–70%; Crist—70–80%; Crist—>90%; Rich: Rich—50–60%

Democratic primary results
Party	Candidate	Votes	%
Democratic	Charlie Crist	623,001	74.36%
Democratic	Nan Rich	214,795	25.64%
Total votes		837,796	100%

== Libertarian Party ==
=== Candidates ===
==== Declared ====
- Adrian Wyllie, activist, radio host and former chairman of the Libertarian Party of Florida

==== Withdrew ====
- John Wayne Smith, activist and perennial candidate

==== Declined ====
- Alexander George, former committeeman of the Libertarian Party of Florida and Republican candidate for the U.S. Senate in 2012 (ran as an independent, then withdrew)
- Steve LaBianca, activist and businessman
- Roger Stone, political consultant, lobbyist and strategist

== Independent candidates ==
=== Candidates ===
==== Declared ====
- Glenn Burkett, businessman and perennial candidate
- Farid Khavari, economist, author and independent candidate for governor in 2010

==== Withdrawn ====
- Alexander George, former committeeman of the Libertarian Party of Florida and Republican candidate for the U.S. Senate in 2012

==== Disqualified ====
- Joe Allen, writer

=== Write-in candidates ===
- Piotr Blass

- Running mate: Bob Wirengard

- Timothy Michael Devine

- Running mate: Diane Smith

- Emelia Sandra Harris

- Running mate: Georgianna G. Harris

- Monroe Lee

- Running mate: Juanita Lockett

- Caleb Pringle

- Running mate: Jeffery Lunsford

- Charles Frederick Tolbert

- Running mate: Christine Timmon

== General election ==
=== Candidates ===
The following candidates appeared on the ballot for the general election:

- Rick Scott (Republican), incumbent governor

- Running mate: Carlos Lopez-Cantera, incumbent lieutenant governor

- Charlie Crist (Democratic), former Republican-turned-independent governor and independent candidate for the U.S. Senate in 2010

- Running mate: Annette Taddeo-Goldstein, former chair of the Miami-Dade County Democratic Party and nominee for Florida's 18th congressional district in 2008

- Adrian Wyllie (Libertarian), activist, radio host and former chairman of the Libertarian Party of Florida

- Running mate: Greg Roe, insurance executive

- Glenn Burkett (Independent), businessman and perennial candidate

- Running mate: Jose Augusto Matos

- Farid Khavari (Independent), economist, author and independent candidate for governor in 2010

- Running mate: Lateresa A. Jones

=== Endorsements ===
Charlie Crist/Annette Taddeo-Goldstein

Elected officials

- Randolph Bracy, state representative
- Bob Butterworth, former Florida attorney general
- Kathy Castor, U.S. representative from Florida
- Bill Clinton, former president of the United States
- Joy Cooper, mayor of Hallandale Beach
- Dwight Dudley, state representative
- Katie Edwards, state representative
- Mike Fasano, Pasco County Tax Collector
- Alejandro García Padilla, governor of Puerto Rico
- Dan Gelber, former state senator and nominee for attorney general in 2010
- Eric Jones, mayor of West Park
- Jeri Muoio, mayor of West Palm Beach
- Martin O'Malley, governor of Maryland
- Nan Rich, former state senator and candidate for governor in 2014
- Jack Seiler, mayor of Fort Lauderdale
- Darren Soto, state senator

Organizations

- American Federation of State, County and Municipal Employees
- Equality Florida
- Florida AFL–CIO
- Florida Education Association
- Florida Pipe Trades Council
- Human Rights Campaign
- Planned Parenthood
- Florida Police Benevolent Association

Newspapers

- La Gaceta
- The Miami Herald
- Orlando Sentinel
- The Palm Beach Post
- Sun-Sentinel
- Tallahassee Democrat
- Tampa Bay Times
Rick Scott/Carlos Lopez-Cantera

Elected officials

- Aaron Bean, state senator
- Jeb Bush, former governor of Florida
- Chris Christie, governor of New Jersey
- Rick Perry, governor of Texas
- Neil Combee, state representative
- Maurice Ferré. former Democratic mayor of Miami
- Heather Fitzenhagen, state representative
- Luis Fortuño, former governor of Puerto Rico
- Andy Gardiner, state senator
- Rudy Giuliani, former mayor of New York City
- Carlos Hernandez, mayor of Hialeah
- John Legg, state senator
- Roberto Martell, mayor of Medley
- Bill McCollum, former attorney general of Florida and candidate for governor in 2010
- Ileana Ros-Lehtinen, U.S. representative from Florida
- Dennis A. Ross, U.S. representative from Florida
- Marco Rubio, U.S. senator from Florida
- Kelli Stargel, state senator
- John E. Thrasher, state senator
- Ritch Workman, state representative

Other individuals

- Jack Nicklaus, professional golfer

Organizations

- Associated Builders and Contractors of Florida
- Florida Forestry Association
- Florida Medical Association
- Florida Police Chiefs Association
- Florida Restaurant and Lodging Association
- Florida Retail Federation
- JAXChamber
- Log Cabin Republicans
- National Federation of Independent Business
- NRA Political Victory Fund

Newspapers

- The Bradenton Herald
- The Florida Times-Union
- Naples Daily News
- El Nuevo Herald
- Tampa Tribune
Adrian Wyllie/Greg Roe

Elected officials

- Gary Johnson, former governor of New Mexico

Organizations

- Boomers Against Elder Abuse

Other individuals

- Francisco Rodriguez, candidate for House District 83
Declined to endorse

Elected officials

- Bob Buckhorn, mayor of Tampa
- Buddy Dyer, mayor of Orlando

Newspapers

- The Bradenton Times

=== Campaign ===
As of early June 2014, Scott had spent almost $13 million since March on television advertisements attacking Charlie Crist, who then appeared the likely Democratic nominee. Although the ads resulted in a tightening of the race, this came about by decreasing Crist's favorability ratings. By contrast, Scott's favorability ratings did not increase. By late September, Scott's television ad spending had exceeded $35 million, and in mid-October it reached $56.5 million, compared to $26.5 million by Crist. On October 22 it was reported that Scott's total spending had exceeded $83 million and he announced that, having previously said he would not do so, he would be investing his own money into the campaign, speculated to be as much as $22 million.

Crist hoped to draw strong support from Florida's more than 1.6 million registered black voters, an effort that was challenging with regards to his previous political career as a Republican. A poll conducted in September 2014 by Quinnipiac University revealed his support among black voters was at 72 percent against Scott, which was below the 90 percent analysts believed he needed to win.

Scott and Crist met in a debate on October 15, held by the Florida Press Association at Broward College. The debate required candidates to receive at least 15% support in major polls to be included. This was allegedly increased from 10% after Wyllie met the initial criteria, but the Miami Herald reported that the threshold had been 15% since 2013. The decision has been criticized as "suppressing choice" and the Wyllie campaign has filed a lawsuit to be included in the debate. U.S. District Judge James I. Cohn dismissed the lawsuit. At this debate, Scott refused to take the stage for seven minutes because Crist had a small electric fan under his lectern. The incident was dubbed "fangate" by media sources such as Politico.

=== Debates ===
2014 Florida gubernatorial election debates
No.	Date	Host	Moderator	Link	Republican	Democratic
Key: P Participant A Absent N Not invited I Invited W Withdrawn						
Key: P Participant A Absent N Not invited I Invited W Withdrawn					Rick Scott	Charlie Crist
1	Oct. 15, 2014	Broward College; Florida Press Association; Leadership Florida	Frank Denton; Rosemary Goudreau; Elliot Rodriguez	C-SPAN	P	P
2	Oct. 21, 2014	CNN; WJXT	Kent Justice; Jake Tapper	C-SPAN	P	P

=== Predictions ===
Source	Ranking	As of
The Cook Political Report	Tossup	November 3, 2014
Sabato's Crystal Ball	Lean D (flip)	November 3, 2014
Rothenberg Political Report	Tossup	November 3, 2014
Real Clear Politics	Tossup	November 3, 2014

=== Polling ===
Poll source	Date(s) administered	Sample size	Margin of error	Rick Scott (R)	Charlie Crist (D)	Adrian Wyllie (L)	Other	Undecided
St. Pete Polls	November 2, 2014	1,834	± 2.3%	46%	46%	6%	—	3%
Public Policy Polling	November 1–2, 2014	1,198	± 2.8%	44%	44%	6%	—	6%
Public Policy Polling	November 1–2, 2014	1,198	± 2.8%	46%	47%	—	—	7%
0ptimus	October 30–November 2, 2014	2,559	± 2%	43%	41%	10%	—	6%
Quinnipiac University	October 28–November 2, 2014	817	± 3.4%	41%	42%	7%	1%	9%
Quinnipiac University	October 28–November 2, 2014	817	± 3.4%	42%	44%	—	3%	11%
Zogby Analytics	October 28–31, 2014	688	± 3.8%	38%	45%	8%	—	9%
YouGov	October 25–31, 2014	1,795	± 2.7%	41%	41%	—	5%	13%
SEA Polling	October 29–30, 2014	1,300	± 2.7%	46%	44%	4%	—	6%
SEA Polling	October 28–29, 2014	800	± 3.5%	45%	43%	5%	—	7%
Cherry Communications	October 27–29, 2014	508	± 4%	44%	39%	4%	—	13%
University of Florida	October 24–28, 2014	850	± 3.1%	36%	36%	6%	—	20%
Quinnipiac University	October 22–27, 2014	817	± 3.4%	40%	43%	8%	—	9%
Quinnipiac University	October 22–27, 2014	817	± 3.4%	42%	45%	—	2%	11%
0ptimus	October 20–26, 2014	4,893	± 1.4%	42%	39%	12%	—	7%
Gravis Marketing	October 22–24, 2014	861	± 3%	42%	44%	—	—	14%
CBS News/NYT/YouGov	October 16–23, 2014	5,422	± 2%	46%	45%	—	2%	7%
Quinnipiac University	October 14–20, 2014	984	± 3.1%	42%	42%	7%	1%	8%
Quinnipiac University	October 14–20, 2014	984	± 3.1%	44%	44%	—	2%	11%
Saint Leo University	October 16–19, 2014	500	± 4.9%	40%	43%	8%	—	9%
Saint Leo University	October 16–19, 2014	500	± 4.9%	45%	45%	—	—	10%
0ptimus	October 13–19, 2014	4,701	± 1.5%	41%	40%	12%	—	7%
St. Pete Polls	October 17, 2014	1,855	± 2.3%	44%	45%	8%	—	3%
Rasmussen Reports	October 15–17, 2014	1,114	± 3%	47%	47%	—	2%	4%
SurveyUSA	October 10–13, 2014	566	± 4.2%	41%	45%	7%	—	7%
CNN/ORC	October 9–13, 2014	610 LV	± 4%	44%	44%	9%	—	4%
CNN/ORC	October 9–13, 2014	850 RV	± 3.5%	40%	42%	10%	—	8%
Gravis Marketing	October 11–12, 2014	1,023	± 3%	44%	42%	—	—	14%
University of Florida	October 7–12, 2014	781	± 3.2%	40%	40%	6%	—	7%
0ptimus	October 6–12, 2014	6,384	± 1.3%	39%	41%	13%	—	8%
St. Pete Polls	October 8–11, 2014	3,128	± 1.8%	45%	44%	8%	—	3%
University of North Florida	September 29–October 8, 2014	471	± 4.74%	38%	43%	10%	<1%	9%
University of North Florida	September 29–October 8, 2014	471	± 4.74%	42%	47%	—	2%	9%
SurveyUSA	October 2–6, 2014	594	± 4.1%	42%	44%	6%	—	8%
0ptimus	September 29–October 5, 2014	6,494	± 1.2%	39%	40%	13%	—	8%
Public Policy Polling	October 3–4, 2014	1,161	± 2.9%	43%	45%	8%	—	5%
CBS News/NYT/YouGov	September 20–October 1, 2014	5,689	± 2%	47%	44%	—	1%	8%
SurveyUSA	September 26–29, 2014	588	± 4.1%	40%	46%	8%	—	6%
0ptimus	September 22–28, 2014	3,356	± 1.7%	40%	41%	11%	—	8%
SurveyUSA	September 19–22, 2014	588	± 4.1%	43%	42%	4%	—	11%
Quinnipiac University	September 17–22, 2014	991	± 3.1%	44%	42%	8%	1%	5%
Quinnipiac University	September 17–22, 2014	991	± 3.1%	46%	44%	—	2%	7%
Cherry Communications	September 18–21, 2014	813	± 3.5%	43%	39%	4%	5%	7%
0ptimus	September 15–21, 2014	6,079	± 1.3%	41%	41%	11%	—	8%
SurveyUSA	September 12–15, 2014	571	± 4.2%	44%	39%	7%	—	9%
0ptimus	September 8–14, 2014	3,660	± 1.7%	41%	40%	8%	—	11%
Rasmussen Reports	September 8–10, 2014	1,000	± 3%	40%	42%	—	—	18%
SurveyUSA	September 5–8, 2014	576	± 4.2%	45%	44%	3%	—	8%
Associated Industries	September 4–7, 2014	1,000	± 3.1%	47%	41%	—	—	12%
AIF Political Operations	September 4–7, 2014	1,000	± 3.1%	43%	40%	5%	—	12%
AIF Political Operations	September 4–7, 2014	1,000	± 3.1%	46%	40%	—	—	14%
Public Policy Polling	September 4–7, 2014	818	± 3.8%	39%	42%	8%	—	11%
Public Policy Polling	September 4–7, 2014	818	± 3.8%	41%	44%	—	—	14%
0ptimus	September 1–7, 2014	4,386	± 1.5%	42%	40%	8%	—	10%
Mason-Dixon	September 2–4, 2014	625	± 4%	43%	41%	4%	1%	11%
CBS News/NYT/YouGov	August 18–September 2, 2014	5,962	± 2%	46%	43%	—	4%	8%
University of Florida	August 27–31, 2014	814	± 3.4%	41%	36%	6%	—	17%
University of Florida	August 27–31, 2014	814	± 3.4%	44%	38%	—	—	19%
SurveyUSA	August 27–28, 2014	580	± 4.2%	43%	45%	4%	—	7%
Gravis Marketing	August 14–24, 2014	859	± 4%	37%	37%	—	—	26%
0ptimus	August 18–24, 2014	9,333	± 1%	42%	39%	9%	—	11%
SurveyUSA	August 15–18, 2014	564	± 4.2%	44%	41%	4%	8%	4%
0ptimus	August 11–17, 2014	12,812	± 0.9%	44%	41%	—	—	15%
Cherry Communications	August 10–13, 2014	627	± 4%	41%	35%	—	4%	20%
Cherry Communications	August 10–13, 2014	627	± 4%	44%	41%	—	—	15%
SurveyUSA	July 31–August 4, 2014	576	± 4.2%	45%	43%	—	8%	4%
0ptimus	July 28–August 3, 2014	4,714	± 1.5%	45%	44%	—	—	11%
Rasmussen Reports	July 29–30, 2014	900	± 3%	42%	41%	—	8%	9%
CBS News/NYT/YouGov	July 5–24, 2014	6,873	± ?	48%	43%	—	4%	5%
Quinnipiac University	July 17–21, 2014	1,251	± 2.8%	37%	39%	9%	1%	15%
Quinnipiac University	July 17–21, 2014	1,251	± 2.8%	40%	45%	—	2%	12%
SurveyUSA	July 17–21, 2014	564	± 4.2%	40%	46%	—	8%	6%
Hart/North Star	June 26–July 6, 2014	1,202	± 3.5%	47%	40%	—	—	13%
SurveyUSA	June 30–July 4, 2014	558	± 4.2%	45%	43%	—	7%	5%
Gravis Marketing	June 20–23, 2014	1,232	± 3%	41%	39%	6%	—	15%
SurveyUSA	June 20–23, 2014	541	± 4.3%	42%	41%	—	8%	8%
Cherry Communications	June 11, 2014	806	± 3.5%	41%	38%	4%	—	17%
SurveyUSA	June 5–10, 2014	556	± 4.2%	40%	44%	—	8%	8%
Public Policy Polling	June 6–9, 2014	672	± 3.8%	42%	42%	—	—	16%
Saint Leo University	May 28–June 4, 2014	500	± 5%	43%	41%	—	—	16%
SurveyUSA	May 20–22, 2014	531	± 4.3%	42%	40%	—	9%	8%
SurveyUSA	May 9–12, 2014	554	± 4.2%	41%	44%	—	7%	8%
McLaughlin & Associates	May 4–6, 2014	800	± 3.4%	42%	38%	—	—	20%
Quinnipiac University	April 23–28, 2014	1,413	± 2.6%	38%	48%	—	2%	12%
Gravis Marketing	April 23–25, 2014	907	± 3%	44%	43%	5%	—	9%
SurveyUSA	April 2014	?	± 4.3%	41%	44%	—	6%	8%
Rasmussen Reports	April 21–22, 2014	750	± 4%	39%	45%	—	6%	10%
Mason-Dixon	April 15–17 & 21–22, 2014	700	± 3.8%	42%	42%	4%	—	12%
Magellan Strategies	April 14–15, 2014	868	± 3.33%	45%	43%	—	5%	7%
SurveyUSA	April 10–14, 2014	502	± 4.5%	41%	46%	—	7%	6%
Public Policy Polling	April 1–3, 2014	814	± 3.1%	42%	49%	—	—	10%
Sunshine State News	March 31–April 3, 2014	800	± 3.46%	45%	44%	—	1%	10%
Saint Leo University	March 16–19, 2014	500	± 5.0%	39%	43%	—	—	18%
University of North Florida	March 6–16, 2014	507	± 4.35%	33%	34%	—	17%	17%
University of Florida	January 27–February 1, 2014	1,006	± 3%	40%	47%	—	—	13%
Gravis Marketing	January 30–31, 2014	808	± 4%	44%	47%	3%	—	6%
Quinnipiac University	January 22–27, 2014	1,565	± 2.5%	38%	46%	—	—	16%
Hamilton Strategies	January 14–20, 2014	700	± 3.8%	44%	49%	—	—	7%
Public Policy Polling	January 16–21, 2014	591	± 4%	41%	43%	—	—	15%
Saint Leo University	December 1–8, 2013	400	± 5%	34%	46%	—	—	20%
Fabrizio McLaughlin	November 24–26, 2013	1,000	± 3.1%	45%	49%	—	—	6%
Quinnipiac University	November 12–17, 2013	1,646	± 2.4%	40%	47%	—	2%	12%
Gravis Marketing	November 8–10, 2013	932	± 3%	36%	46%	—	—	19%
University of North Florida	September 30–October 8, 2013	526	± 4.27%	40%	44%	—	2%	14%
Public Policy Polling	September 27–29, 2013	579	± 4.1%	38%	50%	—	—	12%
St. Pete Polls	August 1–2, 2013	3,034	± 1.8%	30%	40%	9%	—	22%
Quinnipiac University	June 11–16, 2013	1,176	± 2.9%	37%	47%	—	2%	12%
Public Policy Polling	March 15–18, 2013	500	± 5.4%	40%	52%	—	—	8%
Quinnipiac University	March 13–18, 2013	1,000	± 3.1%	34%	50%	—	1%	15%
Hamilton Strategies	January 30–February 4, 2013	600	± 4%	41%	41%	—	—	7%
Public Policy Polling	January 11–13, 2013	501	± 4.4%	39%	53%	—	—	8%
Public Policy Polling	August 31–September 2, 2012	1,548	± 2.5%	42%	45%	—	—	13%
Public Policy Polling	July 26–29, 2012	871	± 3.3%	41%	44%	—	—	15%
Public Policy Polling	November 28–December 1, 2011	700	± 3.7%	32%	55%	—	—	13%
Public Policy Polling	September 22–25, 2011	476	± 4.5%	38%	51%	—	—	11%
Public Policy Polling	June 16–19, 2011	848	± 3.4%	34%	56%	—	—	10%

Hypothetical polling

With Scott

Poll source	Date(s) administered	Sample size	Margin of error	Rick Scott (R)	Buddy Dyer (D)	Other	Undecided
Public Policy Polling	January 11–13, 2013	501	± 4.4%	41%	37%	—	23%

Poll source	Date(s) administered	Sample size	Margin of error	Rick Scott (R)	Pam Iorio (D)	Other	Undecided
Public Policy Polling	March 15–18, 2013	50	± 5.4%	37%	44%	—	19%
Public Policy Polling	January 11–13, 2013	501	± 4.4%	39%	43%	—	19%

Poll source	Date(s) administered	Sample size	Margin of error	Rick Scott (R)	Bill Nelson (D)	Other	Undecided
University of Florida	January 27–February 1, 2014	1,006	± 3%	42%	46%	—	12%
Fabrizio McLaughlin	November 24–26, 2013	1,000	± 3.1%	46%	48%	—	6%
Quinnipiac University	June 11–16, 2013	1,176	± 2.9%	38%	48%	1%	13%

Poll source	Date(s) administered	Sample size	Margin of error	Rick Scott (R)	Nan Rich (D)	Other	Undecided
Quinnipiac University	July 17–21, 2014	1,251	± 2.8%	41%	34%	4%	21%
Public Policy Polling	June 6–9, 2014	672	± 3.8%	40%	34%	—	25%
Saint Leo University	May 28–June 4, 2014	500	± 5%	44%	31%	—	25%
Quinnipiac University	April 23–28, 2014	1,413	± 2.6%	42%	36%	3%	19%
Saint Leo University	March 16–19, 2014	500	± 5%	40%	32%	—	28%
University of Florida	January 27–February 1, 2014	1,006	± 3%	41%	36%	—	23%
Quinnipiac University	January 22–27, 2014	1,565	± 2.5%	41%	37%	—	22%
Public Policy Polling	January 16–21, 2014	591	± 4%	40%	34%	—	25%
Saint Leo University	December 1–8, 2013	400	± 5%	36%	31%	—	32%
Quinnipiac University	November 12–17, 2013	1,646	± 2.4%	43%	35%	3%	19%
University of North Florida	September 30–October 8, 2013	526	± 4.27%	43%	28%	2%	27%
Public Policy Polling	September 27–29, 2013	579	± 4.1%	37%	36%	—	27%
Quinnipiac University	June 11–16, 2013	1,176	± 2.9%	42%	36%	3%	20%
Public Policy Polling	March 15–18, 2013	500	± 5.4%	42%	36%	—	21%
Public Policy Polling	January 11–13, 2013	501	± 4.4%	41%	37%	—	22%
Public Policy Polling	May 31–June 3, 2012	642	± 3.9%	35%	47%	—	18%

Poll source	Date(s) administered	Sample size	Margin of error	Rick Scott (R)	Alex Sink (D)	Other	Undecided
Public Policy Polling	March 15–18, 2013	501	± 4.4%	40%	45%	—	15%
Quinnipiac University	March 13–18, 2013	1,000	± 3.1%	34%	45%	1%	20%
Public Policy Polling	January 11–13, 2013	501	± 4.4%	40%	47%	—	14%
Public Policy Polling	November 28–December 1, 2011	700	± 3.7%	37%	53%	—	10%
Public Policy Polling	September 22–25, 2011	476	± 4.5%	41%	52%	—	7%
Public Policy Polling	June 16–19, 2011	848	± 3.4%	35%	57%	—	8%

Poll source	Date(s) administered	Sample size	Margin of error	Rick Scott (R)	Debbie Wasserman Schultz (D)	Other	Undecided
Public Policy Polling	January 11–13, 2013	501	± 4.4%	42%	44%	—	14%

With Putnam

Poll source	Date(s) administered	Sample size	Margin of error	Adam Putnam (R)	Charlie Crist (D)	Other	Undecided
Quinnipiac University	March 13–18, 2013	1,000	± 3.1%	30%	49%	1%	20%

Poll source	Date(s) administered	Sample size	Margin of error	Adam Putnam (R)	Alex Sink (D)	Other	Undecided
Quinnipiac University	March 13–18, 2013	1,000	± 3.1%	29%	37%	2%	33%

=== Results ===
Scott defeated Crist by a slim margin, garnering 48% percent of the vote to the former's 47%. With the loss, Crist became the first candidate in Florida history to lose statewide elections as a Democrat, as a Republican, and as an independent.

2014 Florida gubernatorial election
Party	Candidate	Votes	%	±%
Republican	Rick Scott (incumbent)	2,865,343	48.14%	−0.73%
Democratic	Charlie Crist	2,801,198	47.07%	−0.65%
Libertarian	Adrian Wyllie	223,356	3.75%	+1.44%
Independent	Glenn Burkett	41,341	0.70%	N/A
Independent	Farid Khavari	20,186	0.34%	+0.20%
n/a	Write-ins	137	0.00%	0.00%
Total votes		5,951,571	100.0%	N/A
Republican hold				

==== Counties that flipped from Democratic to Republican ====
- Franklin (largest city: Eastpoint)
- Liberty (largest city: Bristol)
- Madison (largest city: Madison)

==== Counties that flipped from Republican to Democratic ====
- Monroe (largest city: Key West)

==== By congressional district ====
Scott won 16 of 27 congressional districts, including two held by Democrats, with the remaining 11 going to Crist, including three held by Republicans.

District	Scott	Crist	Representative
1st	69.66%	25.95%	Jeff Miller
2nd	49.72%	46.37%	Gwen Graham
3rd	59.07%	36.22%	Ted Yoho
4th	64.31%	31.09%	Ander Crenshaw
5th	31.34%	64.67%	Corrine Brown
6th	56.32%	38.5%	Ron DeSantis
7th	49.82%	44.13%	John Mica
8th	53.74%	40.18%	Bill Posey
9th	41.63%	53.17%	Alan Grayson
10th	51.72%	42.61%	Daniel Webster
11th	55.91%	37.98%	Rich Nugent
12th	48.36%	44.32%	Gus Bilirakis
13th	42.59%	50.3%	Bill Young
14th	34.28%	60.5%	Kathy Castor
15th	51.13%	41.83%	Dennis Ross
16th	49.94%	43.95%	Vern Buchanan
17th	54.82%	38.43%	Tom Rooney
18th	47.89%	47.87%	Patrick Murphy
19th	60.88%	35.48%	Trey Radel
20th	16.48%	81.48%	Alcee Hastings
21st	34.69%	62.58%	Ted Deutch
22nd	41.31%	55.72%	Lois Frankel
23rd	34.55%	62.74%	Debbie Wasserman Schultz
24th	12.29%	86.21%	Frederica Wilson
25th	55.7%	41.67%	Mario Díaz-Balart
26th	46.41%	50.74%	Carlos Curbelo
27th	47.99%	49.54%	Ileana Ros-Lehtinen

== See also ==
- List of governors of Florida
- 2014 United States gubernatorial elections
