= Paul Stanton (politician) =

American politician

Personal details
- Born: June 18, 1985 (age 40)
- Party: Independent (since 2017)
- Other political affiliations: Libertarian (before 2017)
- Occupation: Computer programmer

Paul Anthony Stanton (born 1985) is an Iraq war veteran, computer programmer, and former Libertarian candidate for US Senate in Florida in 2016. After serving in the Army, he protested the wars in Iraq and Afghanistan, and with the American Civil Liberties Union, he sued an airport for his right to hand out copies of the U.S. Constitution in protest of Transportation Security Administration policies. On October 22, 2017, Stanton resigned from the Libertarian Party, citing concerns of white nationalism within his state affiliate.

== Army service ==
Stanton joined the Army after the September 11 attacks in 2001. He served in the United States Army for six years, including a tour of duty in Iraq. His experiences with war helped shape his views on politics. He became an advocate for peace, and in 2012, after meeting Gary Johnson, he joined the Libertarian Party.

== Airport lawsuit ==
In 2010 the Transportation Security Administration began to use full body scanners in their screening process for airline passengers. These scanners produced what looks like a nude image of the person being scanned. Opting out of these scanners required a new, more aggressive patdown. Stanton decided to protest these measures by handing out copies of the U.S. Constitution and other materials in the Fort Wayne International Airport. However, the airport's policy stated that he would have to stand in a specific place outside the terminal and would have to apply for a permit, to be approved by the executive director of the airport authority, at least seven days in advance in order to protest. As a result, Stanton and the American Civil Liberties Union brought a lawsuit against the Fort Wayne – Allen County Airport Authority, claiming that this policy violates First Amendment rights to free speech. A federal judge ruled that airports were a nonpublic forum, meaning free speech could be limited for the general feeling of safety, stating that the Authority's right to amend constitutional free speech law "is related to the protection of its interests in maintaining a secure environment, reducing congestion, ensuring the free and orderly flow of pedestrian traffic." The airport later changed its rules to allow free speech in more areas, and by 2013 the TSA had replaced the unpopular nude-image full body scanners with less-invasive scanners.

== 2016 senatorial campaign ==
In 2016, Stanton began his campaign for U.S. Senate as a Libertarian, taking part in the first ever Libertarian Party Senate primary in Florida. He defeated his opponent, attorney Augustus Sol Invictus, with 73.5% of the vote. Stanton then faced incumbent Senator Marco Rubio (R) and Congressman Patrick Murphy (D) in the general election. Stanton has said he hoped the Presidential campaign of Gary Johnson would bring more attention to his run for Senate.

Stanton has polled at 10% and 9% in three-way polls conducted by Public Policy Polling in September 2016. According to Brian Doherty of Reason magazine, this could have placed Stanton in at least one televised debate.

Stanton lost the election, finishing third with roughly 2% of the vote.

== Political positions ==
Stanton will propose to cut taxes for companies with less than $500,000 in revenue completely, and work to reduce taxation for all businesses as much as possible. He supports the immediate decriminalization of all drugs, and the end of mandatory-minimum sentencing for drug-related offenses. Stanton advocates eliminating FICA taxes for all workers under the poverty line and believes direct charitable help to the poor should be encouraged, and that this can be done by instituting a dollar-for-dollar tax rebate for charitable donations. He advocates a complete and full audit of the Federal Reserve, and will oppose all efforts to provide weapons to foreign governments and insurgent groups. He has stated that he wants to help fix environmental problems in Florida by ending subsidies to the Big Sugar industry.

== Electoral history ==
United States Senate Libertarian primary in Florida, 2016
Candidate	Votes	%
Paul Stanton	2,943	73.5
Augustus Invictus	1,059	26.5
Total votes	4,009	100

United States Senate election in Florida, 2016
Party	Candidate	Votes	%
Republican	Marco Rubio (inc.)	4,833,429	52.0
Democratic	Patrick Murphy	4,119,235	44.3
Libertarian	Paul Stanton	196,794	2.1
Independent	Bruce Nathan	52,430	0.6
Independent	Tony Khoury	45,787	0.5
Independent	Steven Machat	26,894	0.3
Independent	Basil E. Dalack	22,223	0.2
	Write-ins	280	nil
Total votes		9,297,072	100

Party political offices
Preceded by Alexander Snitker	Libertarian nominee for U.S. Senator from Florida (Class 3); 2016	Succeeded by Most recent
