= Adrian Wyllie =

American political activist and radio personality

Alfred Adrian Wyllie

Chairman of the Libertarian Party of Florida
- In office June 2015 – October 2015

Personal details
- Born: Alfred Adrian Wyllie; May 17, 1970 (age 56) Dunedin, Florida, U.S.
- Party: Libertarian
- Spouse: Dawn
- Children: 2
- Website: wyllieforgovernor.com

Alfred Adrian Wyllie (born May 17, 1970) is an American political activist, radio personality, and investigative journalist. He was a Libertarian candidate for Governor of Florida in 2014 and is the former chairman of the Libertarian Party of Florida. Wyllie is a host of a syndicated AM radio program that focuses on libertarian issues. Wyllie is known as a constitutional activist for challenges to the Real ID Act and the Transportation Security Administration (TSA). Wyllie has recently converted from constitutional libertarianism to Anarcho-capitalism as detailed in his current podcast “Unattended Baggage.”

== Libertarian Party of Florida ==
Wyllie was elected as Chairman of the Libertarian Party of Florida (LPF) in April 2011, after serving as media director for the 2010 campaign of Libertarian U.S. Senate candidate Alexander Snitker. Wyllie did not seek re-election when his term as LPF Chairman ended in 2013, expressing his intention to focus on the Governor's race. Under his leadership, the LPF took a more active role in media relations and activism, and LPF membership increased by over 1,200%.

Wyllie was reelected to as Chairman of the Libertarian Party of Florida in June 2015. He resigned in October of same year in opposition to Augustus Sol Invictus's candidacy for U.S. Senate as a Libertarian.

== Radio program ==
Wyllie partnered with Alexander Snitker in 2010 to form the 1787 Network. Wyllie is co-host and producer of the network's flagship program, Liberty Underground, which airs on four AM and one FM radio stations, and can be heard in eight states. Liberty Underground is broadcast on WTAN 1340 AM in Tampa, Florida, on WDCF 1350 in Dade City, Florida, and KLRG 880 AM in Little Rock, Arkansas.

== Investigative journalism ==
In a series of investigate reports for the 1787 Network, Wyllie was the first to reveal that Florida law enforcement agencies are now using facial recognition scans taken at the time of driver's license renewals as a source database for covert video surveillance. In a related investigation, he was the first to report that the Florida Senate had inserted an amendment into a transportation bill that would authorize the introduction of biometric radio frequency identification chips into Florida drivers' licenses.

Wyllie also alleged corruption surrounding the Florida Department of Environmental Protection, as well as Florida Senator Charles Dean and others in a series of articles surrounding the treatment of whistle blower Bob Burton. Burton, who recorded an allegedly incriminating telephone conversation with Dean's chief of staff, had his home raided and his alleged evidence seized by the Florida Department of Law Enforcement after attempting to release the recording and other evidence he had gathered. Burton was later arrested and charged with felony wiretapping.

== Real ID activism ==
On May 17, 2011, Wyllie surrendered his driver's license in protest of the REAL ID Act. He then attempted to be cited for violating the law by contacting all local law enforcement agencies to turn himself in. No agency would respond to his provocation. Two months later, he berated the sheriff of Pinellas County, Florida on his radio program, which resulted in his receiving a citation hours later.

On May 9, 2014, Wyllie was arrested after parking his car to attend a charity event at the Safety Harbor Spa and Resort. He was charged for driving a vehicle without a driver's license and his automobile was impounded. After being held for seven hours in a Pinellas County jail, Wyllie was released on his own recognizance.

== TSA activism ==
On July 4, 2011, Wyllie sent a letter to all of Florida's 67 sheriffs urging them to arrest Transportation Security Administration (TSA) agents who violate the US and Florida Constitutions, as well as statutes regarding sexual battery as it applies to individual TSA employees during enhanced pat-down procedures.

When the sheriffs failed to respond to his letter, he and former Arizona Sheriff Richard Mack organized a protest at the Florida Sheriffs Association annual convention in Daytona Beach on July 31, 2011. This prompted the sheriffs to respond with a joint statement contending that the Supremacy Clause of the U.S. Constitution prevented them from enforcing laws against federal authorities.

== 2014 Florida gubernatorial candidate ==
On October 26, 2012, Wyllie announced the formation of an exploratory committee to seek the Libertarian nomination for the 2014 Florida gubernatorial election. On January 10, 2013, he formally declared his candidacy.

On April 29, 2014, Wyllie announced that he had been invited to the 2014 Florida Gubernatorial Debate at Broward College on October 15. On June 2, 2014, Adrian Wyllie officially qualified to be included on the 2014 Florida ballot. He was invited to partake in another debate of Florida gubernatorial candidates hosted by Florida Blue Key and local Fox stations to be held at the University of Florida on September 29, 2014. On June 20, 2014, Wyllie was declared the only Libertarian running for Florida Governor in the 2014 election and was listed third on the ballot after the Republican and Democratic nominees.

Wyllie received 223,356 votes, the most of any third-party candidate for governor in Florida's history, but placed third in the 2014 general election behind incumbent Republican Rick Scott, who won, and Democrat Charlie Crist.

== Fiction author ==
In August 2016, Wyllie published his first novel, The Cassandra Trigger, a dystopian thriller that tells the story of a working-class American family struggling to survive an economic collapse, surveillance society and police state in 2028. The book outlines Wyllie's prediction for the future expansion of privacy infringements and government abuse of power.

== Personal life ==
Wyllie, a third-generation native of Pinellas County, Florida, has been married since 1991 to Dawn Cieskiewicz Wyllie, and has two sons. He served in the U.S. Army and Florida National Guard, and is president of White Hat Info Tech Corporation.
