= James Greer =

James Greer could refer to:

- James Augustin Greer (1833–1904), American naval officer
- Jim Greer (born 1962), American politician and businessman
- James Greer (writer) (born 1971), American novelist, screenwriter, and musician
- James Greer (character), fictional character in Tom Clancy's Ryanverse
