= Augustus Sol Invictus =

American far-right activist (born 1983)

- Professional headshot of Augustus Sol Invictus
- Born: Austin Gillespie; July 31, 1983 (age 43)
- Education: University of South Florida (BA); DePaul University (JD)
- Occupations: Attorney, politician, publisher
- Political party: Libertarian (2015–2017); Republican (2017–present)
- Children: 4

Augustus Sol Invictus (born Austin Mitchell Gillespie; July 31, 1983) is an American far-right political activist, attorney, blogger, and white nationalist.

Invictus was a candidate for the Libertarian Party nomination in the 2016 United States Senate election in Florida. Local party chairman Adrian Wyllie resigned over his candidacy and the unwillingness of the party to disavow it. He lost overwhelmingly in the primary to opponent Paul Stanton, garnering 26.5% of votes cast.

In a press release from 2015, Invictus was accused by the Libertarian Party of Florida of advocating for eugenics and "state-sponsored murder". In April 2017, the Libertarian Party of Florida, following mediation, issued a retraction of the 2015 press release, stating that "it exceeded the mandate of the executive committee", and declaring that "Mr. Invictus has always been a member in good standing, is a past chair of the Libertarian Party of Orange County, a sponsor of the 2016 and 2017 LPF State Conventions, as well as a dedicated volunteer on the Legislative Review Committee." In July 2017, Invictus changed his party affiliation to Republican, announcing his candidacy for the 2018 United States Senate election in Florida.

Invictus was a headline speaker at the Unite the Right rally in Charlottesville, Virginia, on August 12, 2017, that ended with three deaths, and was ultimately tried and convicted for his actions that weekend. He has represented Marcus Faella, the former head of the white-supremacist group American Front, in court. Invictus is the publisher of The Revolutionary Conservative, a publication which calls for a violent uprising and states that its aim is to restore the American republic and defend Western civilization. He was controversial within the Libertarian Party for his neo-fascist political views and history of racist associations. He has been described by media reports as being associated with the alt-right movement. He has proposed the repeal of several amendments to the US Constitution, stipulating that only White male citizens should be allowed to vote or own real property.

== Career ==
Invictus graduated from the University of South Florida with a BA with honors in philosophy. Following his graduation, he attended DePaul University College of Law and graduated in 2011. While in law school, Invictus earned a fellowship at the International Human Rights Law Institute.

He was managing partner of Imperium, P.A., a law firm he founded in 2013, until his retirement from the practice of law in 2017. Invictus is currently the publisher of The Revolutionary Conservative, a far-right publication with the stated aim of "restoring the American republic and defending Western Civilization".

Invictus was a headlined speaker at the Unite the Right rally in Charlottesville, Virginia, on August 12, 2017, where a White supremacist drove his vehicle into a crowd of counter-protesters, killing Heather Heyer. The Miami Herald wrote of Invictus's involvement in the fatal event that "the political fallout over Charlottesville may end whatever hopes for public office [Invictus] had."

== 2016 U.S. Senate campaign ==
On May 19, 2015, Invictus announced his campaign for the U.S Senate as a candidate for the Libertarian Party in the 2016 Florida election.

In response to Invictus's campaign, Adrian Wyllie resigned from his position as chairman of the Libertarian Party of Florida, calling Invictus a "violent Fascist and Neo-Nazi" whose ideology was incompatible with libertarianism and saying he did not want to be part of the same party. The chairman also accused Invictus of supporting eugenics and of "sadistically dismembering a goat in a ritualistic sacrifice". Invictus responded by admitting that he once wrote a paper advocating eugenics but saying that he has since changed his mind. He said he had sacrificed the goat and drunk its blood as part of a ritual to give thanks for surviving a pilgrimage in spring 2013, but denied it was "sadistic". In 2024, he claimed he had begun drinking human blood as he had converted to Catholicism, in reference to the Catholic doctrine of transubstantiation.

He has also said that he is not a White supremacist, citing the fact that his children are part Hispanic; he acknowledged that some White supremacists support his campaign, while claiming he does not associate with them.

In May 2016, Invictus began the "Possibility of Revolution" tour in Florida, speaking in Orlando, Jacksonville, Tallahassee, Tampa, Fort Myers, and Miami in one continuous circuit. At the end of this tour, Paul Stanton entered the Senate race, creating the first Libertarian primary for the United States Senate in Florida history. Invictus lost the primary election on August 30, 2016, with Stanton receiving 73.5% of the vote.

== Views ==
During his campaign, a letter written by Invictus in 2013 came to light in which he renounced his citizenship and claimed to have plans of venturing out in the woods only to return bringing war:

I have prophesied for years that I was born for a Great War; that if I did not witness the coming of the Second American Civil War I would begin it myself. Mark well: That day is fast coming upon you. On the New Moon of May, I shall disappear into the Wilderness. I will return bearing Revolution, or I will not return at all.

Invictus has been accused of supporting state-sponsored eugenics for a paper he wrote as a law student. Invictus, however, wrote a disclaimer to the paper stating that although he believes the strong and intelligent should breed and the weak and stupid should not, he does not believe that the government can be trusted to implement such a program.

Invictus has been identified as a Holocaust denier. He has said: "Do I believe that 6 million Jews were killed by evil Hitler? Is that what you're asking me? ... Okay, then I am still waiting to see those facts."

Invictus has proposed repealing the Fourteenth, Fifteenth, and Nineteenth Amendments to the Constitution of the United States, insisting that only white male citizens should have the right to vote or own real property.

Invictus believes that the United States should embrace a non-interventionist approach to foreign policy, arguing that an interventionist approach has resulted in the loss of American lives and the accumulation of trillions of dollars in debt. He opposes using the U.S. military to protect US national interests or prevent meddling in US affairs.

Invictus advocates for balancing the budget, shrinking the size of government, ceasing "reckless" government spending and deregulating American business. He is also in favor of repealing the personal income tax, abolishing the IRS and recreating the tax code. According to Invictus, he does not support mass immigration and is against open borders for the United States. However, he supports policies that would streamline the process of immigration and naturalization so that immigrants who wish to integrate and work in the United States can do so with ease.

Invictus is opposed to the war on drugs and has labeled it a failure. He supports repealing the Controlled Substances Act and abolishing the DEA. He believes that the United States should find alternative forms of energy so as to reduce U.S dependence on foreign energy. He does not believe there should be a trade-off between economic freedom and the destruction of the environment.

== Personal life ==
He was accepted into and graduated from DePaul University in Chicago with a Juris Doctor and by 2006 he was married, and a father of four multi-ethnic children. Invictus was born Austin Gillespie, and in 2006 he legally changed his name to Augustus Sol Invictus. Until 2022 he was a Thelemite, though was expelled from the Thelemic fraternal organization, Ordo Templi Orientis; he has also identified as a pagan.

As of 2022, he has reverted to the Catholic Faith and identifies as a traditionalist.

== Legal issues ==
Invictus has been accused of crimes including domestic violence, stalking, and threats of bodily harm verbally and with a firearm, which have been reported to law enforcement in Florida at least ten times. The first such allegation which gained public attention was reported in 2017 by his ex-fiancée. The Huffington Post reported that in July 2017, police in Orlando, Florida, "recommended that charges of domestic battery by strangulation and aggravated battery be filed against Invictus." According to the article, charges were never filed due to both a lack of evidence and a lack of cooperation from the alleged victim. The victim stated to police that she hesitated as a result of feeling intimidated by Invictus's connections to white-supremacist organizations and legal expertise in addition to her allegations of serial acts of violence.

Invictus was arrested in Melbourne, Florida, on January 1, 2020, on charges of "kidnapping, 'high and aggravated' domestic violence and possession of a firearm during a crime of violence". Upon his arrest in Melbourne, Invictus was then extradited to Rock Hill, South Carolina, where the alleged crimes, this time against another woman, who is his estranged wife, occurred. He requested a bail hearing which occurred on February 14, 2020, and his accuser made a statement to the court recounting her allegations. Her claims match as a pattern, the description of the acts Invictus's prior accuser had alleged he perpetrated. For example, his wife alleged he had abused her for 6 years via assaults including punching her in the stomach to avoid visible bruises, and locking her in the bedroom for days. Also as in prior allegations by the other victim, Invictus's wife independently reported to law enforcement that he had repeatedly strangled her, threatened her life with a firearm, and used the threat to use his extremist followers to silence her, claiming he would send them to target her and end her life if she escaped. On February 14, 2020, Judge Hall in Rock Hill, South Carolina, ordered that Invictus be held in jail without bond. On February 19, 2020, kidnapping charges were dismissed after the judge asserted that the charge lacked probable cause; however, the charges of "high and aggravated" domestic violence and possession of a firearm in commission of a crime of violence remain.

On March 31, 2020, the court determined that Invictus could be freed on bail after his public defender cited the risk posed to inmates by the coronavirus pandemic.

However, less than three weeks after Invictus's release he was re-arrested in violation of the terms of his bond. Despite her restraining order, Invictus's wife reported that he made threatening and harassing contact with her over twenty times. He allegedly made an implied threat of violence at which point she agreed to meet him in a park with their children. At that time, Invictus allegedly spoke to their child referring to his accuser with derogatory slurs. On July 23, 2020, Invictus was denied a fourth request for bail by a judge in Rock Hill, South Carolina.

Stalking charges in Florida were dropped on August 4, 2020, after prosecutors determined the case was "not suitable for prosecution". On August 25, 2020, Invictus was granted release bail in York County, South Carolina.

On April 19, 2022, Invictus was found not guilty of all charges after the jury deliberated for 30 minutes. The alleged victim, Invictus's wife, did not attend the trial to testify. After his acquittal, Invictus publicly requested letters of apology from authorities responsible for his arrest and prosecution.

In 2023, Invictus was arrested and charged with crimes related to the 2017 Unite the Right Rally in Charlottesville, Virginia. The trial began in February, 2024, with Invictus' attorney attempting to have the prosecutor's office recuse itself. Although Invictus is a lawyer, he has chosen not to represent himself in court. In October 2024, a jury found him guilty of burning an object with the intent to intimidate, which is a felony in Virginia. In January 2025, Invictus was sentenced to nine-and-a-half months in jail for his conviction, with the sentence delayed for 60 days pending appeal. He was subsequently suspended from the practice of law in Florida.

== Electoral history ==
2016 United States Florida Senate Libertarian primary results
Party	Candidate	Votes	%
Libertarian	Paul Stanton	2,946	73.5
Libertarian	Augustus Invictus	1,063	26.5
Total votes		4,009	100

== See also ==
- List of Thelemites
