= Paul Stanton =

Paul Stanton may refer to:

- Paul Stanton (ice hockey) (born 1967), American ice hockey player
- Paul Stanton (actor) (1884–1955), American character actor
- Paul Stanton (politician) (born 1985), American politician
- Paul T. Stanton (born c. 1973), United States Army general
- David Beaty (author) (1911–1999), British writer, pilot, and psychologist, who wrote novels under the name Paul Stanton
