= Laurence J. Gillis =

American politician

Member of the New Hampshire House of Representatives from the Rockingham 12th district
- In office 1974–1976

Personal details
- Born: Revere, Massachusetts, U.S.
- Party: Democratic; Libertarian
- Education: Harvard University; Boston University School of Law

Laurence J. Gillis is an American politician. A member of the Democratic Party and the Libertarian Party, he served in the New Hampshire House of Representatives from 1974 to 1976.

== Life and career ==
Gillis was born in Revere, Massachusetts. He served in the United States Army from 1964 to 1967. After his discharge, he attended Harvard University, earning his BA degree. He also attended Boston University School of Law, earning his LLB degree, which after earning his degree, he was admitted to the bar, and worked as an attorney in Hampton, New Hampshire.

Gillis served in the New Hampshire House of Representatives from 1974 to 1976. After his service in the House, in 2024, he ran as a Libertarian candidate for the Florida House of Representatives from the 79th district, but did not appear in the ballot. He served as director-at-large of the Libertarian Party of Florida until 2025. Aside from his political career, he served as a professor in the department of legal studies at the University of Maryland Global Campus.
