= Jeff Greene =

American real estate entrepreneur (born 1954)

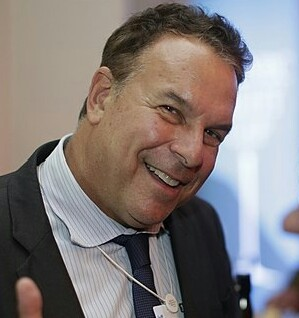
- Greene in 2015
- Born: December 10, 1954 (age 71); Worcester, Massachusetts, United States
- Education: Johns Hopkins University (BA); Harvard University (MBA)
- Occupation: Real estate entrepreneur
- Political party: Democratic
- Spouse: Mei Sze Chan (m. 2007)
- Children: 3

Jeff Greene (born December 10, 1954) is an American real estate entrepreneur. He is a member of the Democratic Party and was a candidate in the 2010 Senate election primaries in Florida. He was a candidate in the 2018 Florida Gubernatorial election, but was eliminated in the primary, finishing in fourth place behind eventual nominee Tallahassee Mayor Andrew Gillum, whom Greene later endorsed.

== Early life ==
Greene was born in 1954 in Worcester, Massachusetts to a working class Jewish family.

He graduated from Doherty Memorial High School in Worcester after his family moved to Florida in 1970 when his father lost his business, staying with his great-aunt while he finished school. In Florida, his father worked refilling vending machines and his mother worked as a waitress.

Greene worked many jobs to put himself through college at Johns Hopkins University, graduating in three years with a B.A. in economics and sociology. Later he attended Harvard Business School, where he earned his Master of Business Administration (MBA) degree in 1979.

== Career ==
To pay for college, he relied on scholarships, loans, part-time jobs and taught Hebrew 3 days a week. To pay his way through Harvard Business School, Greene traveled the country selling circus tickets. In 1977, while he was pursuing his studies at Harvard Business School, he purchased his first property during his time at Harvard and rented out rooms. He owned 18 properties at graduation.

In 1980, Greene relocated to Los Angeles. His first new construction project in the area was an office building in West Los Angeles.

During the late 1980s, Greene focused on constructing condominium buildings.

In Manhattan, Greene oversaw the construction of 100 Vandam, a 25-story tower in west Soho. The project involved the restoration of the building's original six stories, which were built in 1877 and functioned as New York City's first power plant.

In mid-2006, Greene, worried about the possible collapse of the real estate market, spoke with John Paulson. They agreed that the real estate market was unstable and a bubble might be forming in housing. After the meeting, the two engaged a series of unconventional investments trading credit default swaps. The return on Greene's investments ultimately saved his business, and put him on Forbes 400 list.

Greene relocated to Florida in 2007.

== 2010 US Senate campaign ==
On April 30, 2010, Greene announced his intention to run as a Democrat for the United States Senate seat held by George LeMieux.

Greene stated he would refuse campaign contributions from special interests, and would limit individual donations to $100. His platform focused on economic reforms and job creation.

Greene's campaign was endorsed by the Tallahassee Democrat's editorial board.

Greene's attempt to win the Democratic nomination was, however, unsuccessful; Rep. Kendrick Meek won the primary election before losing to Republican Marco Rubio in the November general election.

== Personal life ==
In 2007, Greene married Chinese Australian real estate executive Mei Sze Chan, who is twenty years his junior in age. Chan is an ethnic Chinese refugee from Malaysia who first fled to Australia with her family before heading to New York City after college. In 2009, she gave birth to their first child. Greene and his wife now have three sons and live in Palm Beach. Greene was quoted as saying, "I just wish I had met Mei Sze 20 years ago".
