= Libertarian Party of Florida =

State affiliate of the Libertarian Party

- Chairperson: Matt Johnson
- Secretary: Lisa Gansky
- Founded: 1987
- Membership (2026): ▼34,594
- Ideology: Libertarianism
- National affiliation: Libertarian Party (United States)
- Colors: A dark shade of grey or blue; golden yellow
- Florida Senate: 0 / 40
- Florida House of Representatives: 0 / 120
- U.S. Senate (Florida): 0 / 2
- U.S. House of Representatives (Florida): 0 / 28
- Other elected officials: 2 (June 2024)

Website
- lpf.org

The Libertarian Party of Florida (LPF) is the state affiliate of the Libertarian National Committee in Florida. Founded in 1987, it is committed to the principles of limited government, individual freedom, and personal responsibility.

The current executive committee was elected during the annual convention in June 2025, in Daytona, Florida.

== Leadership ==
Officers

- Chair: Edward Appler
- Vice-Chair: Brent Lawhon
- Secretary: Beth Johnson
- Treasurer: Juana Delacruz

At-Large Directors

- John Morrisey (Director-at-Large 1)
- Larry Gillis (Director-at-Large 2)
- Omar Recuero (Director-at-Large 3)

Regional Representatives

- Nicole Skelly (Region 1)
- VACANT (Region 2)
- VACANT (Region 3)
- (Region 4)
- Addison Patrick (Region 5)
- Dennis "Mike" Simpson (Region 6)
- Joe Hannoush (Region 7)
- JD Pierce (Region 8)
- Dennis Misigoy (Region 9)
- Stephen-Paul Dieter (Region 10)
- Bryan Beavers (Region 11)
- John Paff (Region 12)
- Steven Gallant (Region 13)
- Christopher McQueen (Region 14)

== Voter registration ==
The Libertarian Party of Florida has seen consistent growth in its registered voter base over the decades:

Year	Registered Libertarian Voters	Change from Previous Year
1994	3,585	—
1996	5,509	+1,924
1998	7,037	+1,528
2000	9,462	+2,425
2002	11,852	+2,390
2004	13,806	+1,954
2006	15,533	+1,727
2007	14,860	–673
2008	16,883	+2,023
2010	17,888	+1,005
2012	19,892	+2,004
2014	23,665	+3,773
2016	25,030	+1,365
2017	31,449	+6,469
2018	32,843	+1,394
2020	39,538	+6,695
2022	39,451	–87
**2025**	*(part of “Minor Parties” total)*	**see breakdown below**

Historical data from the Florida Division of Elections and Wikipedia

== Local Chapters and Affiliates ==
County affiliates:

- Alachua County
- Bay County
- Brevard County
- Broward County
- Clay County
- Charlotte County
- Duval County
- Escambia County
- Hillsborough County
- Lake County
- Lee County
- Manatee County
- Miami-Dade County
- Monroe County
- Okaloosa County
- Orange County
- Osceola County
- Palm Beach County
- Pinellas County
- Polk County
- Santa Rosa County
- Seminole County
- St. John's County
- St. Lucie County
- Volusia County

=== Regional affiliates ===
Starting on February 12th, 2015 the Libertarian Party of Florida founded an experimental autonomous "Libertarian Party of the Florida Keys (LPFK)" to serve as a regional branch independent of most LPF oversight in parts of Monroe County and Miami-Dade County with Steven Nekhaila as its inaugural chairman. This is in contrast to how both major parties, and the Libertarian party operate on a county affiliate system. The LPFK went defunct some time after 2022, with the LPF re-launching the affiliate on August 26, 2025.

== Elections ==
=== 2026 elections ===
The Republican Executive Committee of Duval County sued Addison Liberty Patrick to have her removed from the Jackson City Council election, but Circuit Court Judge Gilbert Feltel Jr. ruled on July 1st that the Republicans' claim falls outside the state statute.

=== 2024 elections ===
==== Chase Oliver, 2024 Libertarian Presidential Candidate ====
Chase Oliver was selected as the Libertarian Party's nominee at the national convention in Washington, D.C., May 24–26, 2024, winning **60.61 %** of the final delegate vote.

In the general election held on November 5, 2024, Oliver and running mate Mike ter Maat received **31,972 votes (0.3 %)** in Florida, placing fourth in the state. Nationally, Oliver received **635,551 votes (0.42 %)**, marking the Libertarian Party’s weakest presidential performance since 2008.

=== 2020 elections ===
==== Jo Jorgensen, 2020 Libertarian Presidential Candidate ====
Jo Jorgensen was selected as the Libertarian Party's presidential nominee on May 23, 2020, during the Libertarian National Convention, following multiple rounds of voting. Spike Cohen was selected as her running mate the next day.

In the 2020 United States presidential election in Florida held on November 3, 2020, Jorgensen received **70,324 votes**, comprising **0.6 %** of the total vote in the state. This continued the Libertarian Party’s consistent performance in Florida, albeit at a modest scale compared to their 2016 showing.

=== 2016 elections ===
==== Paul Stanton, 2016 Libertarian U.S. Senate Candidate ====
In 2016, the Libertarian Party of Florida held its first statewide primary for the United States Senate. Two candidates qualified: attorney Augustus Sol Invictus and U.S. Army veteran Paul Stanton.

The race drew national attention due to controversies surrounding Invictus, whose candidacy was criticized by many within the party. Stanton won the August primary with **73.5 %** of the vote to Invictus’s 26.5 %.

In the general election, Stanton received **71,730 votes (1.6 %)** statewide, finishing third behind the Republican and Democratic nominees.

=== 2014 elections ===
In 2014, the Libertarian Party ran their first state executive ticket, with Adrian Wyllie for governor, Greg Roe for lieutenant governor, and Bill Wohlsifer for attorney general. The Wyllie/Roe ticket garnered 3.8% of the vote, a record for the Libertarians in Florida. Wohlsifer got under that, with 2.9% of the vote. The highest percentage that the Wyllie/Roe ticket got in a county was in Citrus County, where they received 7% of the vote.

Down ballot, Lucas Overby got the second highest percentage a Libertarian has ever gotten in a house election, with 24.7% of the vote. Many people at the time attributed it to the lack of a Democrat on the ballot.

=== 2010–2012 Elections ===
In 2010, the Libertarian Party of Florida (LPF) made significant strides by fielding a statewide candidate for the first time, namely Alexander Snitker, who ran for U.S. Senate.

In the subsequent 2012 election, the Libertarian Party of Florida fielded multiple candidates for various positions: Calen Fretts for Florida's 1st congressional district. Peter Richter. Franklin Perez. Jonathan Loesche for the Florida House of Representatives. Additionally, the LPF fielded several candidates for various county and municipal races across the state.

In 2012, the Libertarian Party of Florida faced legal action when Franklin Perez, the 2012 Libertarian candidate for the Florida State House of Representatives (District 28), sued the party. The lawsuit arose from the LPF's failure to refund a candidate filing fee after de-vetting Perez and removing him from the party's state website. The courts ultimately awarded Perez $620.

=== 2000s ===
A sales tax was proposed in Brevard County, but was defeated in a popular vote by 2 to 1 after being denounced by the Libertarian Party.

=== Statewide and Congressional Election Results ===
Year	Office	Candidate	Popular votes	Percentage
2000	11th Congressional District	Charlie Westlake	27,197	15.4%
2004	11th Congressional District	Robert Johnson	31,579	14.1%
2004	21st Congressional District	Frank Gonzalez	54,736	27.2%
2010	United States Senate Class 3	Alexander Snitker	24,850	0.5%
2012	1st Congressional District	Calen Fretts	11,176	3.3%
2014	19th Congressional District Special Election	Ray Netherwood	3,729	3.7%
2014	13th Congressional District Special Election	Lucas Overby	8,893	4.8%
2014	Governor	Adrian Wyllie	223,356	3.8%
2014	Lieutenant Governor	Greg Roe	223,356	3.8%
2014	Attorney General	Bill Wohlsifer	169,394	2.9%
2014	13th Congressional District	Lucas Overby	55,318	24.7%
2014	19th Congressional District	Ray Netherwood	6,671	2.7%

=== Presidential nominee results ===
Since 1972, the Libertarian Party has run a candidate for President of the United States. The candidate who has received the highest vote total in Florida was Gary Johnson in 2016. In every election year after 1984 the Libertarian Party has gained ballot access in Florida.

Year	Nominee	Votes
1976	Roger MacBride (write-in)	103 (nil %)
1980	Ed Clark	30,524 (0.8%)
1984	David Bergland (write-in)	754 (nil %)
1988	Ron Paul	19,796 (0.5%)
1992	Andre Marrou	15,079 (0.3%)
1996	Harry Browne	23,965 (0.5%)
2000	Harry Browne	16,415 (0.3%)
2004	Michael Badnarik	3,502 (0.2%)
2008	Bob Barr	17,220 (0.2%)
2012	Gary Johnson	44,726 (0.5%)
2016	Gary Johnson	207,043 (2.2%)
2020	Jo Jorgensen	70,324 (0.6%)

== Elected public officials ==
Past and present public officials from the Libertarian Party of Florida include:

- Randall Holcombe, Governor's Council of Economic Advisors, 2000–2006
- Scott McPherson, mayor, New Port Richey, 2008–2011
- Thomas W. Glaser, Governor's Holocaust Education Commission, 2004–
- Jared Grifoni, city council, Marco Island, 2016–
- Martin Sullivan, city council, Frostproof, 2015–
- Crystal Turner, city council, Hampton, 2014–
- Jamie Beckett, city commission, Winter Haven Seat 4, 2009–2013
- Dennis Lipp, town council, Loxahatchee Groves Seat 5, 2009–2011
- Gary Gerstein, community council, Fischer Island Seat 161-B, 2014–
- Keon A. Grayson, community council, North Central Seat 83, 2016–
- Marialexandra Garcia, Supervisor Community Development District, Islands at Doral III Seat 4, 2016–
- Marco Alvarez, Jr., Supervisor Community Development District, Century Gardens Village Seat 1, 2016–
- Kenneth Mertz, Port Authority Board, Fernandina Beach, 2002–2010
- Janet Hawkins, Port Authority Board, Seminole County, 1997–200
- Bob Rettie, Zoning Board Vice Chair, Fort Walton Beach, 2002–2006
- Steven A. Reid, Board of Adjustment Chairman, Gainesville, 2004–2010
- Michael Ferber, Board of Adjustment, Fort Lauderdale, 2002–2010
- Mark Clifford, Parks and Recreation Board, Seminole County, 2002–2004
- Matthew Bymaster, Soil and Water Board, Palm Beach County Soil and Water Group 2, 2016–
- Bruce Reichert, Soil and Water Board, Collier County Soil and Water Seat 1, 2015–
- Marc Tancer, Supervisor Soil and Water Board, Palm Beach Seat 1, 2015–
- Larry Frego, Soil and Water Conservation District, St. Johns County Group 2, 2010–2014
- Greg Gimbert, Soil and Water Board, Volusia County District 2, 2014–
- Ron Skrutski, Soil and Water Board, Lee County Seat 2, 2010–2014
- J. Adam Mitchell, Soil and Water Board, Collier County Seat 4, 2008–2012
- Adam Mitchell, Soil and Water Board, Collier County Seat 4, 2008–2012
- Howard Horowitz, Soil and Water Board, Palm Beach County Seat 4, 2008–2012
- Jeff Hunt, Soil and Water Board, Duval County Seat 2, 2008–2012
- Jack Tanner, Soil and Water Board, Lee County Seat 4, 2008–2012
- Kim Hawk, Soil and Water Board, Lee County Seat 5, 2006–2010
- Tom Clark, Soil and Water Board, Lee County Seat 3, 2006–2010
- Bob Waterhouse, Soil and Water Board, Charlotte County, 2006–2014
- Frank Longo, Soil and Water Conservation Board Vice Chair, Palm Beach County Group 2, 2002–2008
- Phil Blumel, Soil and Water Board, Palm Beach County Seat 4, 2002–2008
- Michael Barr, Soil and Water Conservation District Chairman, Seminole County, 2002–2006
- Brad Cline, Soil and Water Board Secretary, Palm Beach County Seat 4, 2002–2008
- Leslee Berryman, Soil and Water Conservation District Secretary, Seminole County, 2002–2006
- Dean Concannon, Soil and Water Conservation District, Seminole County, 2002–2006
- Carol Morris, Fire District Board, Fort Myers Seat 3, 2014–
- Jim Culberson, Taxing District, Sebastian Inlet Area 5, 2004–2014
- Richard D. Paul, Mosquito Control District, Lee County Area 4, 2014–
- Tracy Lundquist, Hospital Authority, West Volusia County Group A Seat 1, 2008–2012

== State Conventions ==
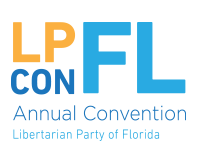

=== 2015 ===
In 2015, the LPF convention was held in New Port Richey, Florida.

=== 2016 ===
The 2016 state convention was held in West Palm Beach in April. During convention, state delegates voted in James Morris as treasurer, Suzanne Gilmore as secretary, and Russ Wood as director at Large (2) to their respective offices. State delegates also voted on individuals to send as delegates and alternate delegates to the Libertarian National Convention the following month in Orlando.

=== 2017 ===
The LPF's 2017 convention was held May 5–7 in Cocoa Beach.

=== 2018 ===
The Libertarian Party of Florida's 2018 state convention was held in Fort Walton Beach, Fla, February 24–26.

=== 2019 ===
The Libertarian Party of Florida's 2019 state convention was held in Tampa, May 3–5, 2019.

=== 2020 ===
The Libertarian Party of Florida held its Annual Business Meeting and Convention in Orlando, Feb 21 to Feb. 23.

=== 2021 ===
The Libertarian Party of Florida held its Annual Business Meeting and Convention in Lakeland, June 11 to Feb. 13.

=== 2022 ===
The Libertarian Party of Florida held its Annual Business Meeting and Convention in Melbourne, Feb 25 to Feb. 27.

=== 2023 ===
The Libertarian Party of Florida held its Annual Business Meeting and Convention in Kissimmee, April 21 to April 23.

=== 2024 ===
The Libertarian Party of Florida held its Annual Business Meeting and Convention in Jacksonville, January 19 to January 21.

=== 2025 ===
The Libertarian Party of Florida held its Annual Business Meeting and Convention in Daytona Beach, June 6 to June 8.

== See also ==
List of state parties of the Libertarian Party (United States)
