= 2010 United States Senate election in Florida =

- November 2, 2010
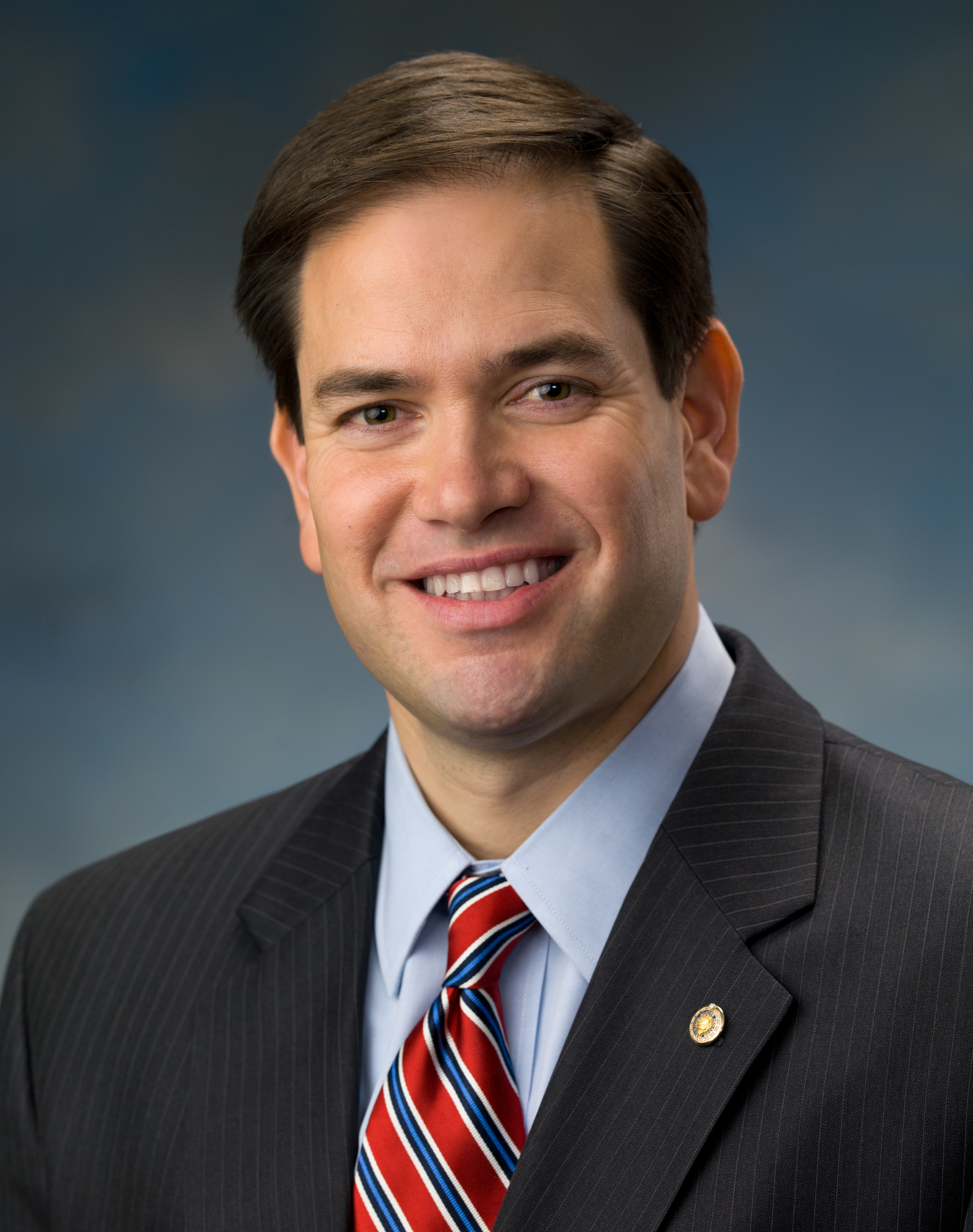

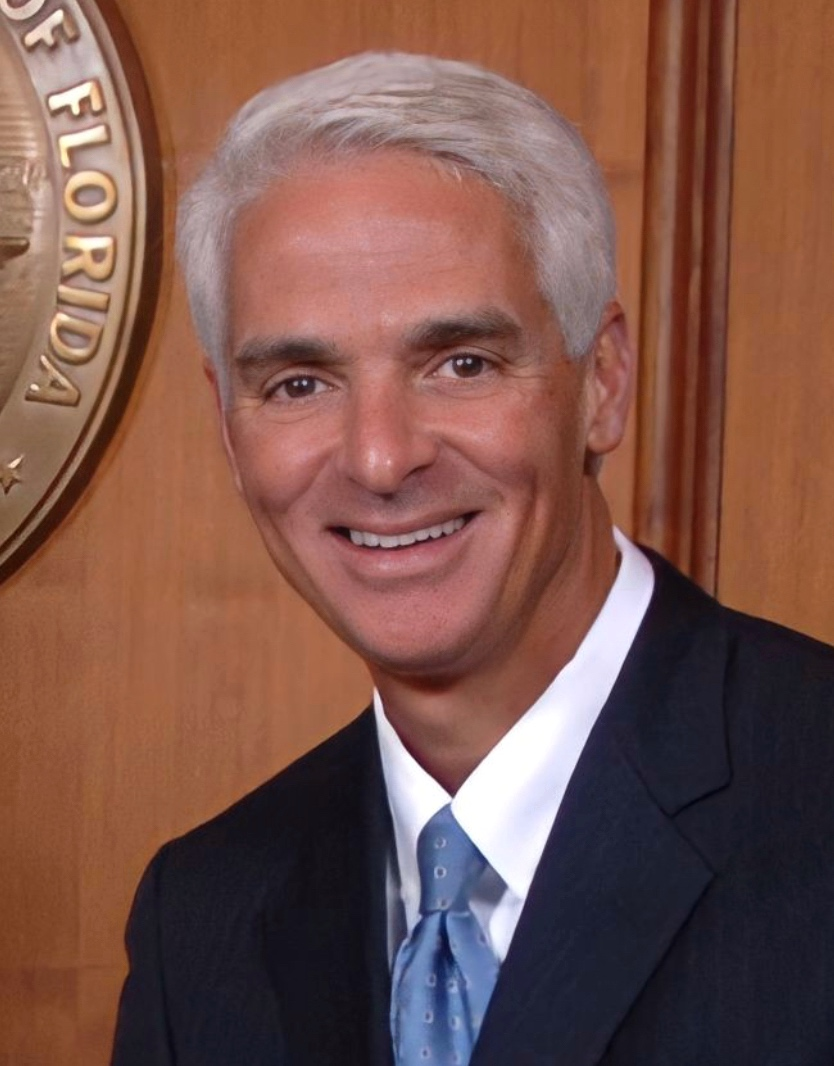

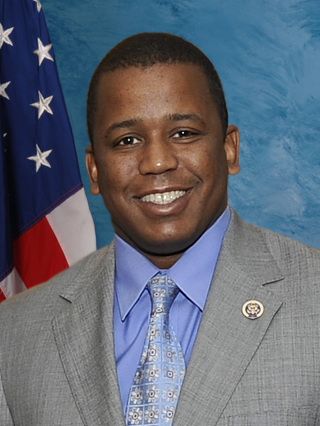
Nominee	Marco Rubio	Charlie Crist	Kendrick Meek
Party	Republican	Independent	Democratic
Popular vote	2,645,743	1,607,549	1,092,936
Percentage	48.89%	29.71%	20.20%
- Rubio: 30–40% 40–50% 50–60% 60–70% 70–80% 80–90% >90% Crist: 30–40% 40–50% 50–60% 60–70% 70–80% 80–90% >90% Meek: 30–40% 40–50% 50–60% 60–70% 70–80% 80–90% >90% Tie: 30–40% 40–50% 50% No votes
U.S. senator before election
George LeMieux (Note: In September 2009, LeMieux was appointed by Governor Charlie Crist to fill the vacancy caused by the resignation of Senator Mel Martínez.)
Republican
Elected U.S. Senator
Marco Rubio
Republican

The 2010 United States Senate election in Florida took place on November 2, 2010, concurrently with other elections to the United States Senate in other states, as well as elections to the United States House of Representatives, and various state and local elections.

Incumbent Republican Senator Mel Martínez, who was elected in a very close race against Democrat Betty Castor with 49% of the vote in 2004, did not seek re-election to a second term, and stated on August 7, 2009, that he would resign prior to the end of his term. As his successor, the governor of Florida, Republican Charlie Crist, appointed his former chief of staff, George LeMieux. LeMieux, who replaced Martínez in the Senate on September 10, 2009, was a placeholder and did not seek election, as Crist aimed at the seat himself. This was one of the five Republican-held Senate seats up for election in a state that Barack Obama won in the 2008 presidential election. Despite the resignation of Martínez, this was not a special election, 2010 was one of the two states, along with Colorado, was already planned as a normal Senate election.

Crist publicly launched his campaign for the seat in mid-2009. When he declared his candidacy, he received many Republican endorsements, including the National Republican Senatorial Committee, Martínez, and 2008 Republican presidential nominee John McCain. However, his support of the American Recovery and Reinvestment Act of 2009 hurt his popularity among conservatives, and Tea Party candidate Marco Rubio, the former Speaker of the Florida House of Representatives, surged in the polls. In April 2010, Crist dropped out of the Republican primary and ran as an independent. The National Republican Senatorial Committee withdrew its endorsement of Crist and demanded a refund of its campaign funds that it provided for the Crist campaign. Rubio went on to win the Republican primary against only token opposition.

U.S. Representative Kendrick Meek was the first Democrat to declare his intention to run and he defeated billionaire businessman Jeff Greene in his party's primary. Also on the ballot were Alexander Snitker of the Libertarian Party, Bernie DeCastro of the Constitution Party, and five other independent candidates.

Polling initially showed Crist neck and neck with Rubio, but by the end of August, Rubio opened up a solid and consistent lead. He was supported by Republican and some Independent voters whereas Democratic and other Independent voters were split between Crist and Meek. Rubio went on to win the election with 49% of the vote to Crist's 30% and Meek's 20%.

== Background ==
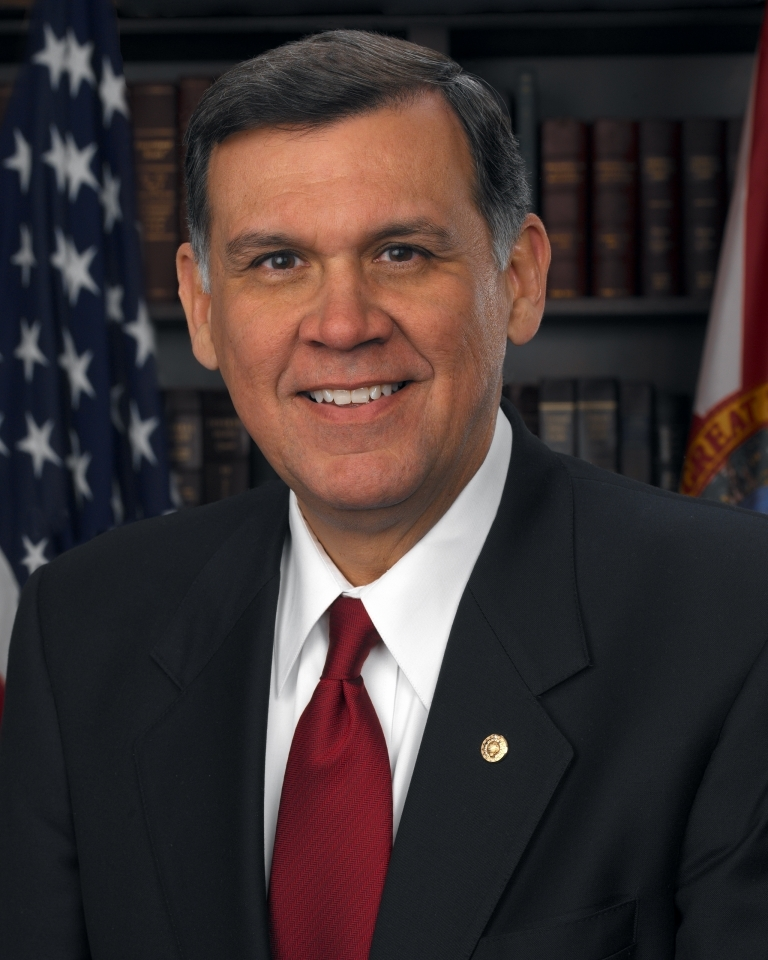
Widely regarded to be one of the most vulnerable incumbent Senators, faced with lagging poll numbers and poor approval ratings, Mel Martínez did not run for re-election to a second term.

Republican Mel Martínez, the former United States Secretary of Housing and Urban Development, was elected to the Senate in 2004, defeating Democrat Betty Castor, the former president of the University of South Florida and former Florida Education Commissioner, by 82,663 votes, 49.4% to 48.3%. He succeeded retiring Democratic incumbent Bob Graham.

Throughout 2008, opinion polls found that Martínez was consistently unpopular with a plurality of Florida voters. Public Policy Polling surveys taken in June, July/August, and September 2008 found that his job approval rating was 23%, 24% and 23%, respectively, with 43%, 40% and 37%, respectively, disapproving of his job performance. A Quinnipiac University Polling Institute survey in November 2008 found him with a higher job approval rating, with 42% approving of his job performance, 33% disapproving and 25% unsure. However, the same survey also found that only 36% of Florida voters thought he deserved to be re-elected, compared to 38% who did not and 26% who were unsure. 36% also said that if the 2010 election were held on that day, they would vote for Martínez, while 40% said they would vote for his Democratic opponent, with 24% unsure. Furthermore, his personal approval rating was 31%, with 28% having an unfavourable opinion of him and 40% saying they had no opinion of him.

In head-to-head matches against specific Democratic opponents, the same Public Policy Polling surveys found Martínez tied with U.S. Representative Robert Wexler and trailing Chief Financial Officer of Florida Alex Sink, former senator Bob Graham, U.S. Representative Debbie Wasserman Schultz, U.S. Representative Allen Boyd and U.S. Representative Ron Klein, by margins of between 1 and 20 points. In its November 2008 ratings of the 2010 Senate elections, The Cook Political Report rated the Florida race as a "tossup" and various media outlets identified Martínez as one of the most vulnerable incumbent senators.

Hypothetical polling with Mel Martínez

Poll source	Date(s) administered	Sample size	Margin of error	Mel Martínez (R)	Allen Boyd (D)	Other	Undecided
Public Policy Polling	September 6–7, 2008	986 LV	± 3.1%	33%	37%	—	30%

Poll source	Date(s) administered	Sample size	Margin of error	Mel Martínez (R)	Bob Graham (D)	Other	Undecided
Public Policy Polling	July 30 – August 2, 2008	807 LV	± 3.5%	31%	51%	—	18%

Poll source	Date(s) administered	Sample size	Margin of error	Mel Martínez (R)	Ron Klein (D)	Other	Undecided
Public Policy Polling	September 6–7, 2008	986 LV	± 3.1%	33%	37%	—	30%

Poll source	Date(s) administered	Sample size	Margin of error	Mel Martínez (R)	Alex Sink (D)	Other	Undecided
Public Policy Polling	June 26–29, 2008	723 LV	± 3.6%	31%	37%	—	32%

Poll source	Date(s) administered	Sample size	Margin of error	Mel Martínez (R)	Debbie Wasserman Schultz (D)	Other	Undecided
Public Policy Polling	July 30 – August 2, 2008	807 LV	± 3.5%	37%	38%	—	25%

Poll source	Date(s) administered	Sample size	Margin of error	Mel Martínez (R)	Robert Wexler (D)	Other	Undecided
Public Policy Polling	June 26–29, 2008	723 LV	± 3.6%	33%	33%	—	34%

Martínez was reported to be planning to run for re-election, but was not expected to make an official statement until January 2009. On December 1, Alex Sink declared that she would run for re-election as Chief Financial Officer rather than for the Senate. The following day, Martínez stated that he would not seek re-election, saying that he wanted to spend more time with his family.

== Republican primary ==
=== Background ===
Upon Senator Martínez's not seeking re-election, early speculation surrounded former Governor Jeb Bush. It was thought that if Bush decided to run, other potential Republican candidates would allow Bush to run uncontested. After consideration, Bush decided not to run. Other potential candidates included Florida Attorney General Bill McCollum, former Speaker of the Florida House of Representatives Marco Rubio, Florida Senate President Jeff Atwater, Florida House Majority Leader Adam Hasner, Orange County Mayor Rich Crotty and U.S. Representatives Vern Buchanan, Lincoln Díaz-Balart, Mario Díaz-Balart, Connie Mack IV and Adam Putnam. Florida Governor Charlie Crist was initially not thought likely to run, instead preferring to run for re-election. Mack and Rubio were thought the most likely to run, with both preparing their campaigns behind the scenes.

On January 28, 2009, McCollum decided not to seek a Senate seat. On February 9, Joe Scarborough, a cable news host for MSNBC and former U.S. Representative from Florida, told the Sarasota Herald-Tribune that he may run for office again, and was considering running for the Senate. An MSNBC spokesman refuted the idea that Scarborough might run, and the following day, Scarborough, while interviewing White House Press Secretary Robert Gibbs, dismissed the idea that he would run.

In early February, speculation increased that Charlie Crist was considering running and that Martínez, who had previously pledged to serve out the rest of his term, would resign. The possibility of Crist appointing himself to the Senate was ruled out by Jim Greer, the chairman of the Republican Party of Florida, but it was further speculated that Crist could also resign, allowing his Republican Lieutenant Governor, Jeff Kottkamp, to appoint Crist to the Senate. The race was essentially "frozen" as potential candidates waited for Crist to declare his intentions and almost immediately, he began to receive criticism from the right of the Republican Party. This dissatisfaction, which had begun soon after he was elected, "snowballed" when he began considering running for the Senate, centring on his perceived moderate positions, his environmental policies, his appointment of James E. C. Perry to the Supreme Court of Florida when conservatives favoured another candidate, his willingness to give President Obama "a shot", and his support of the American Recovery and Reinvestment Act of 2009.

On March 5, Rubio formed an exploratory committee to run for the Senate, though Rubio said that he would run for governor instead if Crist ran for the Senate, with Crist saying that he would make a decision at the end of the legislative session in May. However, towards the end of March, Rubio began openly criticizing Crist for his support of the stimulus and expanded gambling.

In early April, Politico reported that Rubio was likely to stay in the Senate race even if Crist ran, following disapproval of Crist from the party's base. A Mason-Dixon poll from March/April found that only 23% of Republicans would "definitely" vote for Crist, compared to 18% who would "definitely not". During the first fundraising quarter, Rubio raised a "solid" $250,000 and confirmed that he would likely continue his campaign, regardless of what Crist did. On April 2, Mack stated that he would not be a candidate, telling Crist: "I will be your strongest supporter and champion - regardless of whether you seek re-election or election to the Senate." An article in The Tampa Tribune reported on the growing opposition to Crist, which quoted, among others, former state representative Dennis K. Baxley, who said that the disappointment with Crist was "the kind of disappointment that's going to have people looking in other directions for leaders... the conservative movement needs a strong leader." Former Pinellas County Republican Party Chairman Tony DiMatteo said that Crist was more likely to receive a primary challenge to if he ran for the Senate because: "In Tallahassee, there's a conservative Republican Legislature to balance the governor... A lot of people around the state feel the same way I do. We didn't leave Charlie; Charlie left us." Conversely, Republican consultant Adam Goodman said: "He's looked upon as such a popular and compelling figure that the sky's the limit. There are always going to be people to his right and to his left both in the party and in general. As long as he maintains his anti-tax platform, he'll be fine." Political scientist Darryl Paulson said that "Given Crist's ability to raise substantial amounts of money and his appeal to crossovers and independents, I couldn't name anybody who would have even a reasonable shot at defeating him in a primary."

A surprise entry into the race came on April 9, when former New Hampshire senator Bob Smith entered the race. Smith, who had lost his seat in New Hampshire in 2002, subsequently moved to Florida, and briefly ran for the Senate in 2004. He formally declared his candidacy on June 8. At the end of April, with Crist's decision nearing, he was reported to be a "near-lock" to run for the Senate and, in the wake of moderate Republican senator Arlen Specter of Pennsylvania's switch to the Democrats, speculation began about whether there was "room" in the party for a moderate like Crist.

The National Republican Senatorial Committee endorsed Charlie Crist.

After widespread speculation that he would resign before the end of his term, Martínez stated that he would do so on August 7, 2009, leaving Crist in the position to appoint a replacement. He requested applications from U.S. Representative Lincoln Díaz-Balart, attorney Bob Martínez (no relation to Mel Martínez or former governor Bob Martinez) and former Florida Attorney General and Secretary of State of Florida James C. Smith. Appointing Díaz-Balart would create a special election for his then-open House seat and it was suggested that this would prove to be a "tempting proposition" for Rubio, who would then drop down to run for the House instead. Rubio's campaign dismissed speculation he would do anything other than run for the Senate and Crist appointed his chief of staff, George LeMieux, to the Senate instead. Democrat Kendrick Meek expressed disappointment, asserting that Crist should have appointed someone qualified rather than one of the top names "in his cell phone." The Democratic Party of Florida issued an email the same day titled, "George LeMieux (R-Cronyism)", echoing the disapproval of Crist's choice, who was the Deputy Attorney General under Crist, and his chief of staff. In December, Lincoln Díaz-Balart and his brother Mario, also a U.S. Representative, withdrew their endorsements of Crist. They declined to reveal the reason why, saying that "the governor knows why we withdrew and he left us with no alternative", although it was suggested that Crist's appointment of LeMieux and his passing over of a prosecutor that Lincoln Díaz-Balart had recommended for a county judgeship in North Florida were the reasons.

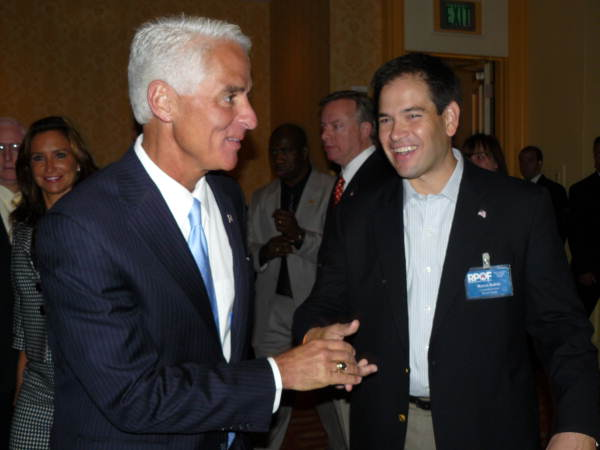
Christ and Rubio exchanging words at an August 2009 event in Kissimmee

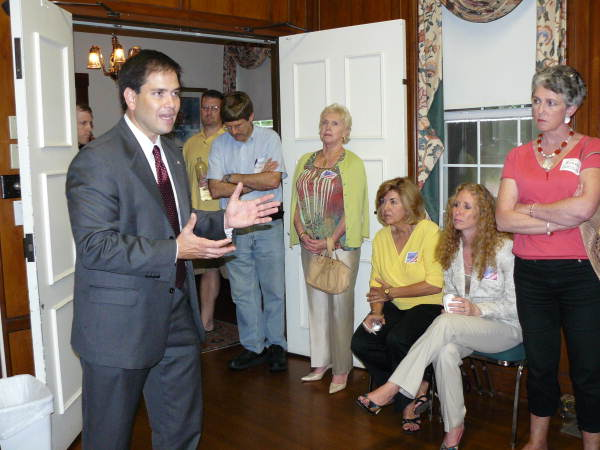
Rubio speaking at an August 2009 campaign event in Tallahassee

Former New Hampshire Senator Bob Smith, who had barely featured in opinion polls, withdrew from the race on March 30, 2010, citing poor fundraising.

After being behind in the polls, Rubio began to cut into Crist's lead, mostly as a reaction to Crist's support of the stimulus bill, which Rubio opposed. Crist subsequently fell behind Rubio by over 20 points. On April 16, Crist's campaign manager, Connie Mack IV, resigned. Ostensibly as a reaction to Crist's veto of a controversial education bill that tied teacher's pay to their students' test scores, Crist's increasingly poor showing in the polls was widely speculated to have been a factor in Mack's decision. Speculation began that Crist would drop out of the Republican primary and run as an independent before April 30, the Florida filing deadline. Polling showed that although Crist was trailing Rubio considerably in the Republican primary, were he to run as an independent, the three-way race would become more competitive; Rubio was leading Meek and Crist in aggregate three-way polling as of June 2010.

On April 28, Crist campaign officials confirmed that Crist would be running as an independent and planned to drop out of the Republican primary.

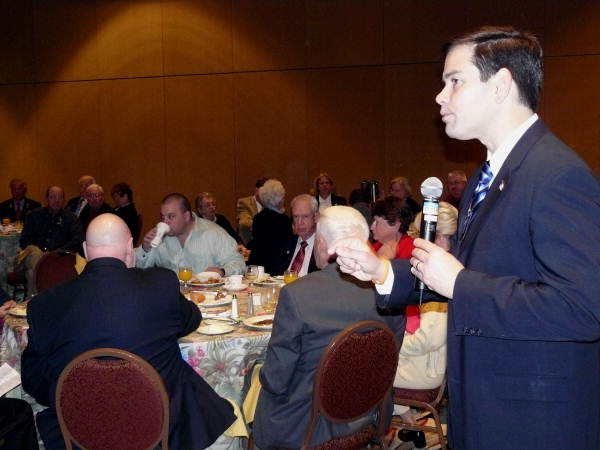
Rubio campaigning in Orlando in January 2010

The primary was held on August 24, 2010. Running virtually unopposed, Rubio won with almost 85% of the vote.

=== Candidates ===
These candidates formally qualified to appear on the Florida Republican primary ballot.

- William Escoffery, physician and attorney
- William Billy Kogut, realtor
- Marco Rubio, former speaker of the Florida House of Representatives

=== Endorsements ===
Charlie Crist

All made while Crist was running as a Republican

State/local officeholders

- Mayor of Miami-Dade County Carlos Alvarez
- Former chairman of the Republican Party of Florida Al Cárdenas.
- Florida House of Representatives Speaker designate Dean Cannon of Winter Park
- State Representative Chris Dorworth of Lake Mary
- State Representative Ron Reagan of Bradenton
- State Representative Bill Galvano of Bradenton
- State Representative Ritch Workman of Melbourne
- State Representative Steve Crisafulli of Merritt Island
- State Representative Juan C. Zapata of Miami
- State Representative Ed Hooper of Clearwater
- State Representative Julio Robaina of Miami
- State Representative Marcelo Llorente of Miami
- State Representative Jimmy Patronis of Panama City
- State Representative John Tobia of Satellite Beach
- State Representative Nick Thompson of Fort Myers
- State Representative Carl Domino of Jupiter
- State Senator Mike Fasano of Florida's 11th District
- State Senator Dennis Jones of Florida's 13th District
- State Senator Durrell Peaden of Florida's 2nd District
- State Senator Rudy Garcia of Florida's 40th District
- State Senator Charles Dean of Florida's 3rd District
- State Senator Lee Constantine of Florida's 22nd District
- State Senator Alex Villalobos of Florida's 38th District
- State Senator Don Gaetz of Florida's 4th District
- State Senator Victor Crist of Florida's 12th District
- State Senator Evelyn Lynn of Florida's 7th District

Federal officeholders

- Former U.S. Senator Mel Martínez
- U.S. Senator from Tennessee Lamar Alexander
- U.S. Senator and Minority Leader from Kentucky Mitch McConnell
- U.S. Senator and 2008 Republican nominee for President from Arizona John McCain
- U.S. Senator from South Carolina Lindsey Graham
- U.S. Senator and chairman of the National Republican Senatorial Committee from Texas John Cornyn
- U.S. Senator from Arizona Jon Kyl
- Congressman Connie Mack IV of Florida
- Congressman Vern Buchanan of Florida

Others

- RNC (Republican National Committee) National Committeeman Paul Senft
- National Republican Senatorial Committee (NRSC)
- Fraternal Order of Police
- Police Benevolent Association
- Florida Dental Hygiene Association
- National Association of Realtors
- Fraternal Order of Police
- Florida Association of State Troopers (FAST)
- Retired Colonel and Medal of Honor recipient involved in Swift Boat Veterans for Truth, Bud Day
- Donald Trump

All made while Crist was running as an independent

State/local officeholders

- Former Congressman Robert Wexler of Florida
- Governor Arnold Schwarzenegger of California
- State Representative Ed Homan of Tampa
- Former Democratic Candidate for Florida's 5th congressional district John Russell
- State Senator Al Lawson of Tallahassee
- Former Mayor Dick Greco of Tampa
- Former State Senator Skip Campbell of Tamarac
Marco Rubio

State/local officeholders

- Governor of Puerto Rico Luis Fortuño
- Former Governor Mike Huckabee of Arkansas
- Former Governor Mitt Romney of Massachusetts
- Former Governor Jeb Bush of Florida
- Former New York City Mayor Rudy Giuliani
- State Senator Steve Oelrich
- State Representative Steve Precourt
- State Representative Will Weatherford of Wesley Chapel

Federal officeholders

- Former Vice President Dick Cheney
- Congressman Jeff Miller of Florida
- Congresswoman Ginny Brown-Waite of Florida
- Congressman Eric Cantor of Virginia
- Congressman Mike Pence of Indiana
- Congressman Paul Ryan of Wisconsin
- Congressman Christopher Smith of New Jersey
- Congressman Tom Price of Georgia
- U.S. Senator from South Carolina Jim DeMint
- U.S. Senator from Oklahoma James Inhofe
- U.S. Senator from Oklahoma Tom Coburn
- Former U.S. Senator from Pennsylvania Rick Santorum
- Former House Majority Leader Dick Armey
- Former Speaker of the House Newt Gingrich

Others

- Former President George W. Bush's political adviser Karl Rove
- Prominent conservative author and talk show host Mark Levin
- Prominent conservative talk show host Laura Ingraham
- Jeb Bush Jr.
- George P. Bush
- Family Research Council President Tony Perkins
- Americans for Tax Reform President Grover Norquist
- President of the Club for Growth Chris Chocola
- Former Republican presidential candidate Steve Forbes
- Eagle Forum PAC
- The Republican Revolution (Facebook Club)
- Florida Medical Association

=== Polling ===
Poll source	Date(s) administered	Sample size	Margin of error	Charlie Crist	Marco Rubio	Other	Undecided
Quinnipiac University	April 8–13, 2010	497	± 4.4%	33%	56%	1%	10%
Rasmussen Reports	April 8, 2010	500	± 4.5%	28%	57%	3%	12%
Rasmussen Reports	March 18, 2010	494	± 4.5%	34%	56%	1%	8%
The Florida Times Union	March 9, 2010	512	± 4.0%	26%	60%	4%	––
Public Policy Polling	March 5–8, 2010	492	± 4.4%	28%	60%	––	12%
Rasmussen Reports	February 18, 2010	442	± 5.0%	36%	54%	4%	7%
Rasmussen Reports	January 27, 2010	449	± 5.0%	37%	49%	3%	11%
Quinnipiac University	January 26, 2010	673	± 3.8%	44%	47%	––	8%
Rasmussen Reports	December 14, 2009	431	± 5.0%	43%	43%	5%	9%
Rasmussen Reports	October 20, 2009	466	± 4.5%	49%	35%	4%	12%
Quinnipiac University	October 12–18, 2009	396	± 4.9%	50%	35%	1%	12%
Rasmussen Reports	August 19, 2009	470	± 5.0%	53%	31%	5%	11%
Quinnipiac University	August 12–17, 2009	446	± 4.6%	55%	26%	1%	18%
Quinnipiac University	June 2–7, 2009	486	± 4.5%	54%	23%	1%	21%

Hypothetical polling

Poll source	Date(s) administered	Sample size	Margin of error	Allan Bense	Vern Buchanan	Charlie Crist	Connie Mack IV	Bill McCollum	Marco Rubio	Other	Undecided
Quinnipiac	April 6–13, 2009	570	± 4.1%	2%	8%	54%	—	—	8%	2%	27%
Quinnipiac	April 6–13, 2009	570	± 4.1%	3%	16%	—	—	—	11%	2%	68%
Quinnipiac	February 11–16, 2009	433	± 4.7%	2%	5%	53%	13%	—	3%	2%	22%
Quinnipiac	February 11–16, 2009	433	± 4.7%	4%	11%	—	34%	—	6%	2%	43%
Quinnipiac	January 14–19, 2009	522	± 4.3%	2%	10%	—	21%	22%	6%	—	40%

=== Results ===
Republican primary results
Party	Candidate	Votes	%
Republican	Marco Rubio	1,069,936	84.62%
Republican	William Kogut	112,080	8.86%
Republican	William Escoffery	82,426	6.52%
Total votes		1,264,442	100.0%

== Democratic primary ==
=== Background ===
Many Democratic politicians were mentioned as potential candidates for the race, including U.S. Representatives Allen Boyd, Kathy Castor, Ron Klein, Kendrick Meek, Debbie Wasserman Schultz and Robert Wexler, State Senators Dave Aronberg and Dan Gelber and Mayor of Orlando Buddy Dyer. Alex Sink also reconsidered her decision not to run. Wasserman Schultz and Wexler stated in December 2008 that they would not run for the Senate.

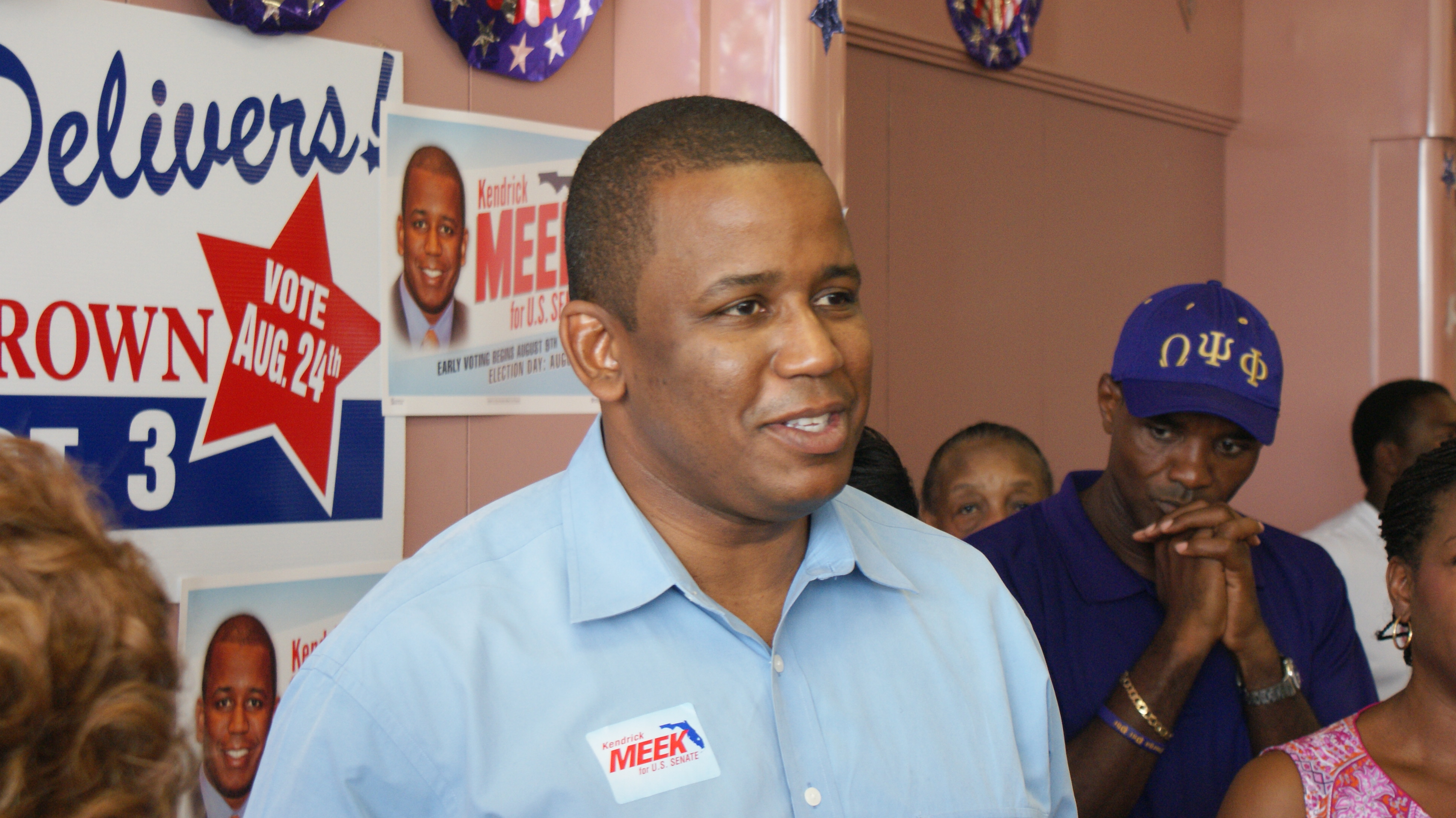
Meek campaigning in Jacksonville in August 2009

Meek was the first major candidate of either party to declare his candidacy, on January 13, 2009. After "serious and careful thought", three days later, Sink reiterated her decision not to seek a Senate seat. Following her decision, Dan Gelber said that he "had been really waiting for her" and had been "prepared to fully support [her]." He also said that "I expect I'll be entering the race in the coming weeks." On January 27, he declared his candidacy. The following day, Allen Boyd also declined to run. In March, it was reported that while Gelber was "consumed" with the legislative session, Meek was raising money and collecting endorsements, including from former president Bill Clinton. Gelber replied, "Frankly the practicality is, it's just hard to find hours in the day to make phone calls right now." At the end of the first fundraising quarter, Meek reported raising $1.5 million. He also decided to gain ballot access via petitions, rather than paying the standard filing fee. He said that collecting the required 100,000 petitions would "keep me engaged with the people of Florida".

Congressman Kendrick Meek was the first Democrat to declare his intention to run. Upon Chief Financial Officer Alex Sink's decision to run for governor, State Senator Dan Gelber formed an exploratory committee. However, Gelber ultimately decided not to run, so as to avoid a divisive primary. Congressman Meek enlisted the aid of former President Bill Clinton, who hosted a fundraiser for him in Jacksonville. Term limited North Miami mayor Kevin Burns, also declared himself a candidate for the Senate seat. On April 30, 2010, Palm Beach billionaire Jeff Greene declared his candidacy.

Maurice Ferré campaigning at a July 2010 picnic hosted in Tallahassee by the Democratic Club of North Florida

The primary took place on August 24, 2010.

=== Candidates ===
These candidates formally qualified to appear on the Florida Democratic primary ballot.

- Glenn A. Burkett, businessman
- Maurice Ferré, former mayor of Miami
- Jeff Greene, businessman
- Kendrick Meek, U.S. representative

=== Endorsements ===
Jeff Greene
- Joseph Abruzzo, state rep.
- Joe Angelo, city commissioner of Wilton Manors
- Carol Roberts, former mayor of West Palm Beach
- James Waldman, state rep.
- Bradenton Herald
Kendrick Meek
- Barack Obama, U.S. president
- Joseph Biden, U.S. vice president
- Bill Nelson, U.S. senator (D-FL)
- Corrine Brown, U.S. congresswoman
- Kathy Castor, U.S. congresswoman
- Ted Deutch, U.S. congressman
- Alan Grayson, U.S. congressman
- Allen Boyd, U.S. congressman
- Alcee Hastings, U.S. congressman
- Ron Klein, U.S. congressman
- Debbie Wasserman Schultz, U.S. congresswoman
- Bill Clinton, former U.S. president
- Bob Graham, former U.S. senator and governor
- Alex Sink, Florida CFO
- Al Sharpton, Civil rights activist and reverend
- Congressional Hispanic Caucus members
- Representative from California and Vice Chair of the Democratic Caucus Xavier Becerra
- Representative from Texas Charles A. Gonzalez
- Representative from Texas Rubén Hinojosa
- Representative from Colorado John Salazar
- Representative from California Joe Baca
- Representative from California Dennis Cardoza
- Representative from California Jim Costa
- Representative from Texas Henry Cuellar
- Representative from Arizona Raúl M. Grijalva
- Representative from Illinois Luis V. Gutierrez
- Representative from New Mexico Ben Ray Luján
- Representative from Texas Solomon P. Ortiz
- Representative from Arizona Ed Pastor
- Representative from Puerto Rico Pedro Pierluisi
- Representative from Texas Silvestre Reyes
- Representative from Texas Ciro Rodriguez
- Representative from California Lucille Roybal-Allard
- Representative from California Linda Sánchez
- Representative from New York Jose Serrano
- Representative from New Jersey Albio Sires

Organizations

- American Federation of State, County and Municipal Employees
- Florida Service Employees International Union
- International Union of Painters and Allied Trades
- United Teachers of Dade

=== Polling ===
Poll source	Date(s) administered	Glenn Burkett	Maurice Ferré	Jeff Greene	Kendrick Meek
Quinnipiac	August 21–22, 2010	––	3%	29%	39%
Public Policy Polling	August 21–22, 2010	––	4%	27%	51%
Mason-Dixon	August 17–19, 2010	––	5%	30%	42%
Quinnipiac	August 11–16, 2010	––	6%	28%	35%
Ipsos/Florida Newspapers	August 6–10, 2010	––	4%	35%	31%
Mason Dixon	August 2–4, 2010	––	––	29%	33%
Quinnipiac	July 22–27, 2010	––	4%	33%	23%
Public Policy Polling	July 16–18, 2010	4%	6%	25%	28%
Quinnipiac	June 2–8, 2010	––	3%	27%	29%

Hypothetical polling

Poll source	Date(s) administered	Sample size	Margin of error	Allen Boyd	Dan Gelber	Pam Iorio	Ron Klein	Kendrick Meek	Alex Sink	Other	Undecided
Quinnipiac	April 6–13, 2009	474	± 4.5%	—	5%	15	8%	16%	—	—	55%
Quinnipiac	February 11–16, 2009	367	± 5.1%	—	5%	16%	14%	16%	—	2%	47%
Research 2000	January 26–28, 2009	400	± 5%	8%	3%	—	—	17%	—	—	72%
Quinnipiac	January 14–19, 2009	442	± 4.7%	8%	1%	—	9%	13%	15%	—	54%

=== Results ===
County results

Democratic primary results
Party	Candidate	Votes	%
Democratic	Kendrick Meek	528,266	57.53%
Democratic	Jeff Greene	284,948	31.03%
Democratic	Glenn Burkett	59,840	6.52%
Democratic	Maurice Ferré	45,219	4.92%
Total votes		918,273	100.0%

== General election ==
=== Candidates ===
==== Major ====
These candidates had received at least 5% in pre-election polling.

- Charlie Crist (I), governor
- Kendrick Meek (D), U.S. representative
- Marco Rubio (R), former speaker of the Florida House of Representatives

==== Minor ====
Qualified either by paying filing fee or with the 112,446 signatures to appear on ballot.

- Lewis Jerome Armstrong (I)
- Sue Askeland (I)
- Bobbie Bean (I)
- Bernie DeCastro (Constitution)
- Bruce Ray Riggs (I)
- Alexander Snitker (Libertarian)
- Rick Tyler (I)

==== Write-ins ====
These candidates qualified for the general election as write-in candidates.

- Piotr Blass
- George Drake
- Howard Knepper
- Carol Ann Joyce LaRosa
- Richard Lock
- Robert Monroe
- Belinda Quarterman-Noah

=== Campaign ===
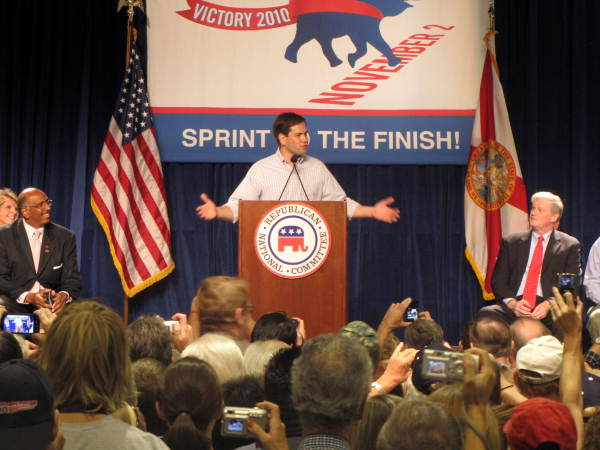
Rubio (center) speaks at an October 2010 rally in Orlando, accompanied by RNC Chairman Michael Steele (seated at left) and Florida Republican Party Chairman John Thrasher (seated at right)

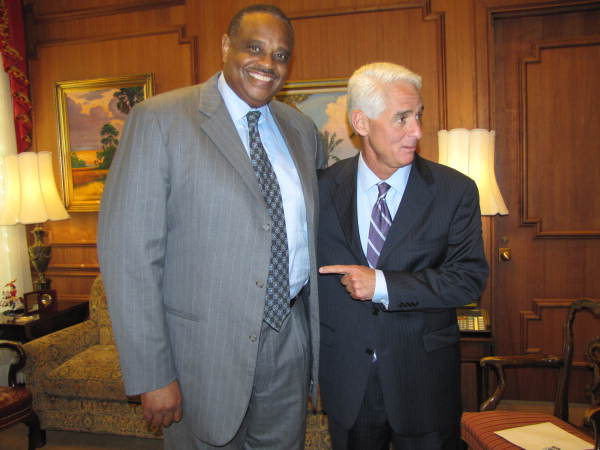
Crist (right) accepting an endorsement from Al Lawson (left)

Charlie Crist argued, "If you want somebody on the far right, you get Marco Rubio. If you want someone on the far left, you have Kendrick Meek. If you want someone who will fight for you and apply common sense, you have me." Meek said, "Marco Rubio has always been the Tea Party candidate and yesterday Charlie Crist says he wants to crash the Tea Party, too. I'm the only candidate who's fighting for the middle class." Rubio argued, "If you like 'Obamacare,' if you like the stimulus plan, you can vote for Charlie Crist or Kendrick Meek."

It was reported that former President Bill Clinton attempted to convince Meek to drop out of the race in October while they campaigned together, as Meek and Crist appeared to be splitting the Democratic vote, allowing Rubio to win. Meek denied the report.

In the final week of the campaign, an advisor confirmed that Crist would caucus with the Democrats if elected to the Senate.

=== Debates ===
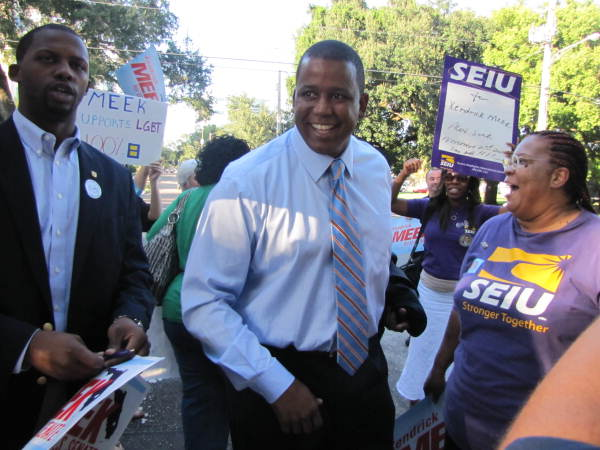
Meek arriving at the WFTV studio for a debate

Friday, September 17
WLTV-Univision 23 Debate
Miami, FL

Tuesday, September 28
WTVT-FOX 13 Tampa Bay Debate
Tampa, FL

Wednesday, October 6
ABC News, WFTV-ABC 9 Orlando & WFTS-ABC 28 Tampa
Moderated by George Stephanopoulos and two local media panelists
Orlando, FL

Wednesday, October 20
Leadership Florida Debate
Ft. Lauderdale, FL

Sunday, October 24
CNN/St. Petersburg Times Debate
Moderated by Candy Crowley
Tampa, FL

Tuesday, October 26
NBC News & WESH-NBC 2 Orlando Debate
Moderated by David Gregory
Orlando, FL

=== Predictions ===
Source	Ranking	As of
Cook Political Report	Solid R	October 26, 2010
Rothenberg	Safe R	October 22, 2010
RealClearPolitics	Likely R	October 26, 2010
Sabato's Crystal Ball	Safe R	October 21, 2010
CQ Politics	Likely R	October 26, 2010

=== Polling ===
Graphical summary

View source data.

Poll source	Date(s) administered	Margin of error	Charlie Crist (I)	Marco Rubio (R)	Kendrick Meek (D)
Public Policy Polling	October 30–31, 2010	± 3.5%	30%	47%	21%
Sunshine State News/VSS	October 30–31, 2010	± 2.49%	31%	48%	20%
Quinnipiac University	October 25–31, 2010	± 3.2%	31%	45%	18%
Rasmussen Reports	October 27, 2010	± 4.0%	30%	50%	16%
Sunshine State News/VSS	October 26–27, 2010	± 2.47%	27%	47%	23%
Mason-Dixon	October 25–27, 2010	± 4.0%	28%	45%	21%
Quinnipiac University	October 18–24, 2010	± 3.5%	35%	42%	15%
Zogby	October 18–21, 2010	± 3.5%	33%	40%	18%
St. Petersburg Times/Miami Herald/Bay News 9	October 15–19, 2010	± 4.1%	26%	41%	20%
CNN/Time/Opinion Research	October 15–19, 2010	± 2.5%	32%	46%	20%
Rasmussen Reports	October 18, 2010	± 4.0%	32%	43%	20%
Suffolk University	October 14–17, 2010	± 4.4%	31%	39%	22%
Public Policy Polling	October 9–10, 2010	± 4.6%	33%	44%	21%
Sunshine State News/VSS	October 6–10, 2010	± 4.6%	33%	44%	21%
Quinnipiac University	October 6–10, 2010	± 3.0%	29%	45%	22%
Rasmussen Reports	October 7, 2010	± 4.0%	25%	50%	19%
Mason Dixon	October 4–6, 2010	± 4.0%	27%	42%	21%
Public Opinion Strategies	September 27–30, 2010	± 3.46%	33%	40%	16%
Quinnipiac University	September 30, 2010	± 2.9%	33%	46%	18%
CNN/Time	September 30, 2010	± 3.5%	31%	42%	23%
TCpalm.com/Zogby	September 27–29, 2010	± 3.5%	33%	39%	18%
Rasmussen Reports	September 28, 2010	± 4.0%	30%	41%	21%
RCP Average	September 21–22, 2010	± 4.0%	29%	40%	22%
Mason-Dixon	September 14, 2010	± 4.0%	28%	40%	23%
Rasmussen Reports	September 14, 2010	± 4.0%	30%	41%	23%
Reuters/Ipsos	September 10–12, 2010	± 4.0%	26%	40%	21%
FOX News	September 11, 2010	± 3.0%	27%	43%	21%
Sunshine State News	September 1–7, 2010	± 3.0%	29%	43%	23%
CNN	September 2–7, 2010	± 3.5%	34%	36%	24%
Rasmussen Reports	August 25, 2010	± 4.0%	30%	40%	21%
Public Policy Polling	August 21–22, 2010	± 3.0%	32%	40%	17%
Quinnipiac	August 11–16, 2010	± 3.0%	39%	32%	16%
Mason Dixon	August 9–11, 2010	± 4.0%	33%	38%	18%
Ipsos/Florida Newspapers	August 6–10, 2010	± 4.0%	33%	29%	17%
Rasmussen Reports	August 9, 2010	± 4.0%	33%	38%	21%
McLaughlin & Associates	July 31 – August 1, 2010	± 4.0%	38%	36%	16%
The Florida Poll/NY Times	July 24–28, 2010	± 4.0%	41%	30%	12%
Quinnipiac	July 22–27, 2010	± 3.2%	39%	33%	13%
Rasmussen Reports	July 21, 2010	± 4.0%	33%	35%	20%
Public Policy Polling	July 16–18, 2010	± 3.26%	38%	29%	13%
Ipsos/Reuters	July 9–11, 2010	± 4.0%	34%	29%	18%
Rasmussen Reports	July 6, 2010	± 4.5%	34%	36%	15%
Florida Chamber of Commerce	June 9–13, 2010	± 4.0%	42%	31%	14%
Quinnipiac	June 1–7, 2010	± 4.7%	40%	33%	14%
Rasmussen Reports	June 7, 2010	± 4.5%	37%	37%	15%
St. Petersburg Times/Miami Herald/Bay News 9	May 14–18, 2010	± 4.0%	30%	27%	15%
Rasmussen Reports	May 16, 2010	± 4.5%	31%	39%	18%
Rasmussen Reports	May 3, 2010	± 4.5%	38%	34%	17%
McLaughlin & Associates	April 24–25, 2010	––	33%	29%	15%
Rasmussen Reports	April 21, 2010	± 4.5%	30%	37%	22%
Quinnipiac	April 8–13, 2010	± 4.4%	32%	30%	24%
Rasmussen Reports	March 18, 2010	––	22%	42%	25%
Public Policy Polling	March 5–8, 2010	± 3.4%	27%	34%	25%
Miami Herald	January 31, 2010	± 3.46%	26%	31%	24%

Hypothetical polling

Poll source	Date(s) administered	Sample size	Margin of error	Bill McCollum (R)	Alex Sink (D)	Other	Undecided
Quinnipiac	January 14–19, 2009	1,370	± 2.7%	36%	35%	—	29%

=== Fundraising ===
Candidate (party)	Receipts	Disbursements	Cash on hand	Debt
Marco Rubio (R)	$21,231,831	$21,024,726	$207,105	$938,803
Charlie Crist (NPA)	$13,655,044	$13,504,327	$150,715	$42,271
Kendrick Meek (D)	$8,704,516	$8,083,976	$63,628	$96,507
Alexander Snitker (L)	$42,014	$37,500	$5,008	$0
Bernie DeCastro (C)	$51,886	$18,596	$33,270	$0
Source: Federal Election Commission

=== Results ===
County flips: Independent Flip / Republican Hold Flip / Democratic Hold

2010 United States Senate election in Florida
Party	Candidate	Votes	%	±%
Republican	Marco Antonio Rubio	2,645,743	48.89%	−0.54%
Independent	Charles Joseph Crist Jr.	1,607,549	29.71%	+29.71%
Democratic	Kendrick Brett Meek	1,092,936	20.20%	−28.12%
Libertarian	Alexander Snitker	24,850	0.46%	N/A
Independent	Sue Askeland	15,340	0.28%	N/A
Independent	Rick Tyler	7,394	0.14%	N/A
Constitution	Bernie DeCastro	4,792	0.09%	N/A
Independent	Lewis Jerome Armstrong	4,443	0.08%	N/A
Independent	Bobbie Bean	4,301	0.08%	N/A
Independent	Bruce Riggs	3,647	0.07%	N/A
Write-in		108	0.00%	±0.00%
Total votes		5,411,106	100.00%	
Republican hold				

==== Results by county ====
County	Marco Rubio Republican		Charlie Crist Independent		Kendrick Meek Democratic		All others		Margin		Total votes cast
County	#	%	#	%	#	%	#	%	#	%	Total votes cast
Alachua	29,825	40.0%	22,302	29.9%	21,314	28.6%	1,035	1.7%	7,523	1.3%	74,476
Baker	5,435	68.0%	1,361	17.0%	1,031	12.9%	168	2.2%	4,074	51.0%	7,995
Bay	40,408	72.6%	8,098	14.6%	6,028	10.8%	1,112	2.0%	32,310	58.0%	55,646
Bradford	5,156	63.4%	1,447	17.8%	1,374	16.9%	158	2.0%	3,709	45.6%	8,135
Brevard	107,930	54.3%	56,202	28.3%	32,069	16.1%	2,587	1.3%	51,728	26.0%	198,788
Broward	133,264	31.7%	151,125	36.0%	133,026	31.7%	2,828	0.7%	-17,861	-4.3%	420,243
Calhoun	2,772	64.3%	787	18.2%	597	13.8%	157	3.6%	1,985	46.1%	4,313
Charlotte	31,258	51.9%	21,269	35.3%	6,932	11.5%	740	1.2%	9,989	16.6%	60,199
Citrus	27,517	49.5%	20,622	37.1%	6,374	11.5%	1,059	1.9%	6,895	12.4%	55,572
Clay	44,926	70.0%	11,272	17.6%	7,253	11.3%	774	1.3%	33,654	52.4%	64,225
Collier	66,349	64.2%	27,188	26.3%	8,876	8.6%	862	0.8%	39,161	37.9%	103,275
Columbia	11,874	62.1%	3,868	20.2%	3,056	16.0%	312	1.7%	8,006	41.9%	19,110
DeSoto	3,608	51.5%	2,151	30.7%	1,104	15.8%	139	1.9%	1,457	20.8%	7,002
Dixie	3,038	57.7%	1,065	20.2%	914	17.4%	339	4.7%	1,973	37.5%	5,266
Duval	140,447	53.2%	48,323	18.3%	72,184	27.3%	3,082	1.1%	68,263	25.9% (Note: Compares margin over Meek.)	264,036
Escambia	55,364	56.8%	22,365	22.9%	18,377	18.8%	1,408	1.4%	32,999	33.9%	97,514
Flagler	17,617	52.3%	8,970	26.6%	6,764	20.1%	364	1.1%	8,647	25.7%	33,715
Franklin	2,223	54.6%	1,115	27.4%	654	16.0%	83	2.0%	1,108	27.2%	4,075
Gadsden	4,411	26.3%	4,289	25.6%	7,894	47.1%	166	1.0%	-3,483	-20.8% (Note: Compares margin over Rubio.)	16,760
Gilchrist	3,531	65.1%	1,106	20.4%	646	11.9%	142	2.6%	2,425	44.7%	5,425
Glades	1,598	57.0%	806	28.8%	341	12.2%	57	2.0%	792	28.2%	2,802
Gulf	3,441	67.9%	768	15.2%	724	14.3%	136	2.7%	2,673	52.7%	5,069
Hamilton	1,966	49.1%	826	20.6%	1,098	27.4%	113	2.8%	868	21.7%	4,003
Hardee	2,862	54.2%	1,543	29.2%	771	14.6%	102	1.9%	1,319	25.0%	5,278
Hendry	3,681	56.0%	1,434	21.8%	1,355	20.6%	101	1.6%	2,247	34.2%	6,571
Hernando	27,413	46.3%	22,823	38.6%	8,020	13.6%	930	1.5%	4,590	7.7%	59,186
Highlands	16,489	54.4%	8,914	29.4%	4,360	14.4%	523	1.7%	7,575	25.0%	30,286
Hillsborough	144,906	45.1%	109,141	34.0%	63,451	19.8%	3,622	1.1%	35,765	11.1%	321,120
Holmes	4,501	74.1%	794	13.1%	570	9.4%	211	3.5%	3,707	61.0%	6,076
Indian River	29,288	60.9%	12,178	25.3%	6,053	12.6%	588	1.2%	17,110	35.6%	48,107
Jackson	9,115	60.5%	2,188	14.5%	3,434	22.8%	330	2.2%	5,681	37.7%	15,067
Jefferson	2,476	39.6%	1,818	29.0%	1,886	30.1%	79	1.2%	590	9.5%	6,259
Lafayette	1,614	64.3%	548	21.8%	277	11.0%	73	2.9%	1,066	42.5%	2,512
Lake	60,967	59.0%	21,982	21.3%	18,770	18.2%	1,583	1.5%	38,985	37.7%	103,302
Lee	103,169	57.2%	56,629	31.4%	18,655	10.3%	1,902	1.0%	46,540	25.8%	180,355
Leon	34,222	34.1%	40,730	40.5%	24,689	24.6%	839	0.8%	-6,508	-6.4%	100,408
Levy	7,613	59.4%	2,628	20.5%	2,250	17.6%	325	2.5%	4,985	28.9%	12,816
Liberty	1,228	55.6%	600	27.2%	304	13.8%	77	3.5%	628	29.4%	2,209
Madison	2,758	43.7%	1,452	23.0%	1,990	31.5%	118	1.9%	768	12.2%	6,318
Manatee	53,127	49.5%	38,667	36.0%	14,363	13.4%	1,140	1.1%	14,460	13.5%	107,297
Marion	64,565	55.8%	27,709	23.9%	21,377	18.5%	2,157	1.8%	36,856	31.9%	115,808
Martin	31,935	58.0%	16,606	30.2%	5,922	10.8%	598	1.1%	15,329	27.8%	55,061
Miami-Dade	220,305	44.8%	121,720	24.7%	146,029	29.7%	3,841	0.8%	74,276	15.1%	491,895
Monroe	11,282	42.7%	10,560	39.9%	4,252	16.1%	344	1.3%	722	2.8%	26,438
Nassau	18,458	68.1%	5,150	19.0%	3,153	11.6%	337	1.2%	13,308	49.1%	27,098
Okaloosa	44,084	71.3%	10,320	16.7%	6,007	9.7%	1,424	2.3%	33,764	54.6%	61,835
Okeechobee	4,550	54.8%	2,515	30.3%	1,106	13.3%	138	1.7%	2,035	24.5%	8,309
Orange	130,903	47.6%	61,233	22.3%	79,616	29.0%	3,221	1.2%	51,287	18.6%	274,973
Osceola	26,008	48.3%	11,926	22.1%	15,100	28.0%	813	1.6%	10,908	20.3%	53,847
Palm Beach	153,256	39.5%	156,140	40.3%	75,242	19.4%	2,885	0.8%	-2,884	-0.8%	387,523
Pasco	64,141	46.4%	54,362	39.3%	17,589	12.7%	2,153	1.5%	9,779	7.1%	138,245
Pinellas	122,339	39.7%	129,529	42.1%	51,629	16.8%	4,354	1.4%	-7,190	-2.4%	307,851
Polk	79,274	48.8%	49,885	30.7%	30,899	19.0%	2,250	1.3%	29,389	18.1%	162,308
Putnam	12,869	59.5%	3,996	18.5%	4,351	20.1%	414	2.0%	8,518	39.4%	21,630
St. Johns	49,761	65.8%	16,763	22.2%	8,365	11.1%	736	1.0%	32,998	33.6%	75,625
St. Lucie	36,218	47.4%	22,699	29.7%	16,472	21.6%	1,047	1.4%	13,519	17.7%	76,436
Santa Rosa	35,461	70.3%	10,227	20.3%	3,837	7.6%	888	1.7%	25,234	50.0%	50,413
Sarasota	68,284	46.3%	59,547	40.4%	18,279	12.4%	1,397	1.0%	8,737	5.9%	147,507
Seminole	76,550	57.2%	29,231	21.8%	26,449	19.8%	1,598	1.1%	47,319	25.4%	133,828
Sumter	26,805	63.2%	9,605	22.6%	5,613	13.2%	402	0.9%	17,200	40.6%	42,425
Suwannee	8,783	65.0%	2,695	19.9%	1,776	13.1%	259	1.9%	6,088	45.1%	13,513
Taylor	3,932	59.1%	1,480	22.2%	1,096	16.5%	144	2.1%	2,452	36.9%	6,652
Union	2,266	62.6%	695	19.2%	585	16.2%	75	2.0%	1,571	43.4%	3,621
Volusia	79,727	50.1%	43,278	27.2%	33,913	21.3%	2,244	1.5%	36,449	22.9%	159,162
Wakulla	5,431	49.1%	3,992	36.1%	1,439	13.0%	197	1.8%	1,439	13.0%	11,059
Walton	13,613	71.4%	3,193	16.7%	1,820	9.5%	440	2.3%	10,420	54.7%	19,066
Washington	5,556	68.6%	1,099	13.6%	1,192	14.7%	248	3.1%	4,364	55.0%	8,095
Totals	2,645,743	48.9%	1,607,549	29.7%	1,092,936	20.2%	64,878	1.2%	1,038,194	19.2%	5,411,106

Counties that flipped from Democratic to Republican

- Monroe (largest city: Key West)
- Hernando (largest municipality: Spring Hill)
- Pasco (largest municipality: Wesley Chapel)
- Hillsborough (largest municipality: Tampa)
- St. Lucie (largest municipality: Port St. Lucie)
- Alachua (largest city: Gainesville)
- Flagler (largest city: Palm Coast)
- Volusia (largest city: Deltona)
- Hamilton (largest municipality: Jasper)
- Jefferson (largest municipality: Monticello)
- Madison (largest municipality: Madison)
- Franklin (largest city: Eastpoint)
- Liberty (largest city: Bristol)
- Wakulla (largest city: Sopchoppy)

Counties that flipped from Democratic to Independent

- Broward (largest city: Fort Lauderdale)
- Palm Beach (largest city: West Palm Beach)
- Leon (largest city: Tallahassee)
- Pinellas (largest municipality: St. Petersburg)
