= Jim Greer =

American politician and businessman

James A Greer
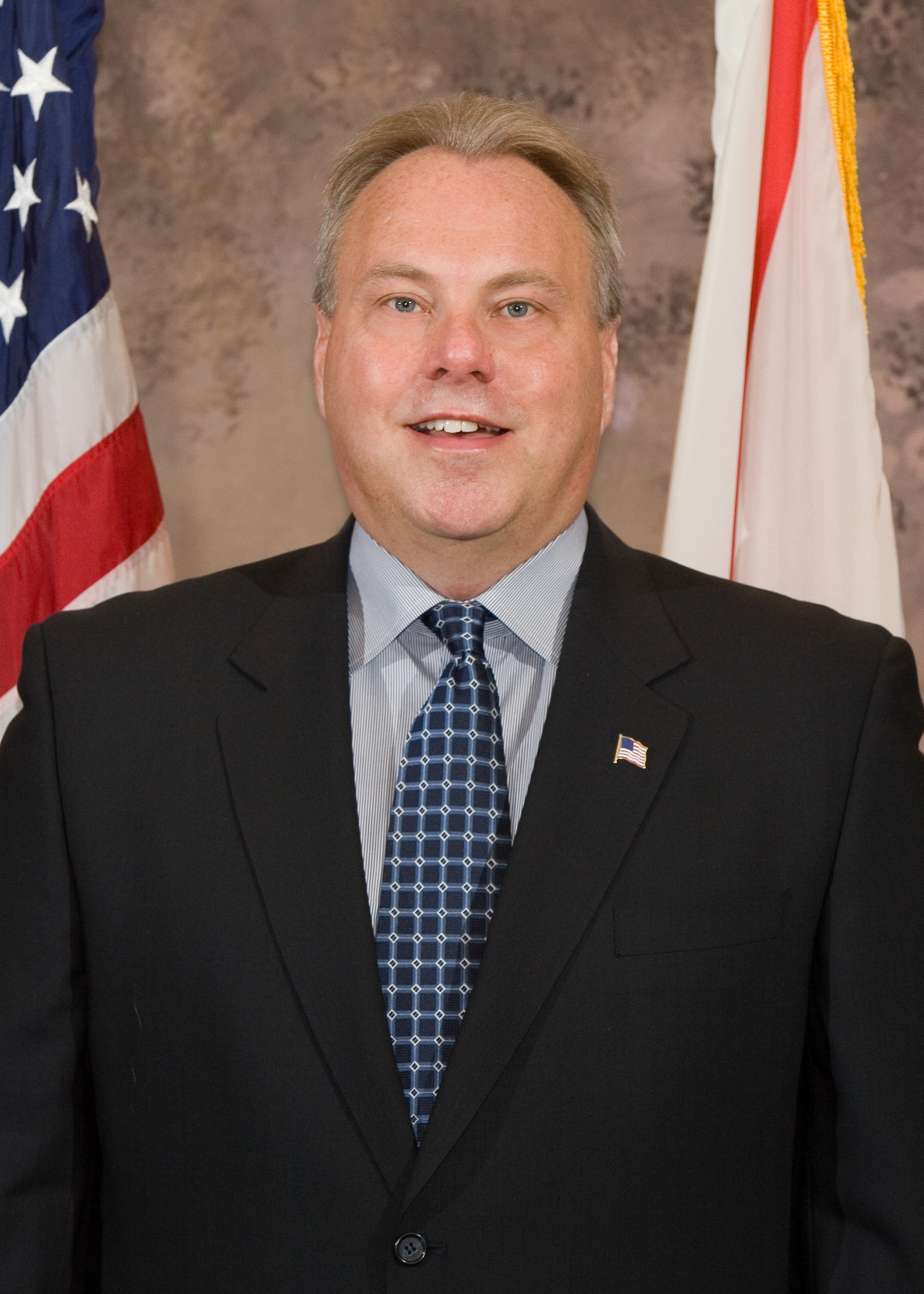

Chairman of the Florida Republican Party
- In office 2006–2010
- Preceded by: Carole Jean Jordan
- Succeeded by: John Thrasher

Personal details
- Born: James Austin Greer; June 8, 1962 (age 64)
- Party: Republican
- Spouse: Lisa M Greer
- Children: 5

James A Greer (born June 8, 1962) is an American former politician and businessman, serving from 2006 to 2010 as the chairman of the Republican Party of Florida, a member of the Republican National Committee and senior political and campaign adviser to the governor.

== Politics ==
Greer served as a councilmember, deputy mayor and acting mayor of the city council of Palm Bay in the early 1990s. He was also elected Deputy Mayor of Oviedo in 2004 and re-elected in 2006. Greer also served as a member of the East Coast Regional Planning Commission appointed by Governor Jeb Bush. Greer also was appointed to the Tourist Development Council. In 2009, upon the election of Michael Steele, the former lieutenant Governor of Maryland as Republican National Committee Chairman, Greer served as co-chairman of Steele's transition team in Washington, D.C. As a member of the Republican National Committee, Greer also served as the chairman of the RNC standing committee on rules. Greer was elected as Chairman of the Republican Party of Florida in 2006. Greer was re-elected as Chairman of the Republican Party with over 77% of the vote in 2008. Greer was considered for election as RNC National Chairman due to his outreach efforts to African Americans and Hispanics. Greer's Chairmanship was considered successful until a political fundraising scandal involving Governor Charlie Christ and other Republican leaders occurred. In March 2013 after pleading guilty to money laundering and fraud Greer was sentenced to 18 months in prison.

== Business ==
After leaving public service and completing his sentence, Greer founded several successful companies and currently serves as the president and CEO of Accredited Drug Testing Inc., Coastal Drug Testing Inc, Labtesting USA and Secure Screenings. These companies provide drug, alcohol and DNA testing services Nationwide. Greer became a millionaire as a result of his business activities. In 2018, Greer was elected Chair of the Governmental Affairs Committee of the National Drug and Alcohol Screening Association (NDASA), in addition to serving as a member of the council of industry advisers. Greer is also a former member of the national board of directors of the Drug and Alcohol Testing Industry Association. In March 2019, Greer was elected chairman of the National Drug and Alcohol Screening Association at its annual convention in San Antonio, Texas, Greer was subsequently re-elected chairman in 2022. In 2023 Greer led the successful merger of the Drug and Alcohol Testing Industry Association (DATIA) into the National Drug and Alcohol Screening Association (NDASA) which became the largest trade association representing the U.S. drug-use testing industry.

== Political scandal and resignation ==
Closely associated with Florida Governor Charlie Crist, Greer resigned from his office as chairman and other positions within the state and national parties following a number of controversies involving party finances and spending behavior by state elected officials. As part of Greer's agreement to resign, the state party entered into a severance agreement whereby Greer would be paid the remaining amount of his salary, which was approximately $120,000. The party later refused to fulfill the terms of the agreement due to the fundraising controversy. Greer was arrested on June 2, 2010, after being indicted on six felony charges: organized scheme to defraud, money laundering, and four counts of grand theft. Prosecutors alleged that Greer, while chair of the Florida GOP, schemed to take money, over $100,000 from the party through a fundraising company that he and others created, Victory Strategies LLC. The Orlando Sentinel further noted that, "The contract for Victory Strategies to take over major donor fundraising was withheld from top GOP finance officials."

However, during the investigation, evidence including several affidavits from the state party finance chairman and major donors supported Greer's claim that the Governor and other top party officials knew about the arrangement and approved it, however, Greer choose to end his trial and surprised many by pleading guilty which avoided a potentially embarrassing trial for the Republican Party and certain elected officials. Much speculation of why Greer ended the trial on the day it was to begin has occurred, a witness list of prominent elected officials that may have been called by Greer's attorney to testify was also made public during the week the trial was scheduled to take place.

Greer's attorney said "The Governor knew about Victory Strategies from the very beginning," Chase said. "They all worked on it together... They saw it as a way to save money and the charges should be dismissed, Greer is a scapegoat for others". Some of Greer's attorneys publicly stated they opposed Greer's guilty plea and believe he would have been acquitted at trial.

Three years after his arrest, Greer unexpectedly pleaded guilty to theft and money laundering charges on February 11, 2013, and was sentenced on March 27, 2013, to 18 months in prison, of which he served 15 months at a low security work release facility. Ultimately, with his unexpected plea, Greer also agreed to pay only $65,000 in restitution to the Republican Party relating to the fundraising agreement.

In 2013, a book was published detailing the circumstances relating to the charges filed against Greer called, The Chairman: The Rise and Betrayal of Jim Greer, written by New York Times best-selling author Peter Golenbock.

== Recognition ==
During Greer's political and business career he has received numerous awards and recognition's including the "Annual Leadership Award" from the Republican Woman's Network, the "State Leadership Award" from the Federation of Black Republicans, "Public Servant Of The Year Award" from the conference of Young Republicans. Greer's expertise in marketing and business management practices along with his entrepreneurial successes have been frequently recognized. His community service and recognitions include serving as President of the Rotary Club, a board member of the Chamber of Commerce, a Paul Harris Fellow and Business Person of the Year. He is a supporter of various charities including Helpful Hands. He has been a regular guest on CNN, Fox News, CBS News with Katie Couric and has appeared on the "Morning Joe" show on MSNBC.

== Personal life ==
Greer is a graduate of Cornell University's executive leadership program, the University of Central Florida's Institute of elected officials, and holds an honorary degree from Seminole State College.

Greer resides in Seminole County, Florida and is married to Lisa Michelle Greer and they have five children.
