= Florida Police Benevolent Association =

Police union

The Florida Police Benevolent Association is a state-wide police union established in 1972, with a reported total membership of over 36,000.

The union is "politically proactive", engaged in labor negotiations, advocacy, legal defense, and political endorsements. It's organized into regional chapters: the South Florida PBA, with 6,500 members from over 40 agencies; the Big Bend PBA, with almost 500 members; West Central Florida BPA; the Broward County PBA; and others.

The FBPA is one of several significant state-wide police unions which are "dominant in all but the largest cities". Others are in California, Texas, Wisconsin, New York, and New Jersey.

== See also ==
- Police unions in the United States
