= 2014 Florida Attorney General election =

- November 4, 2014
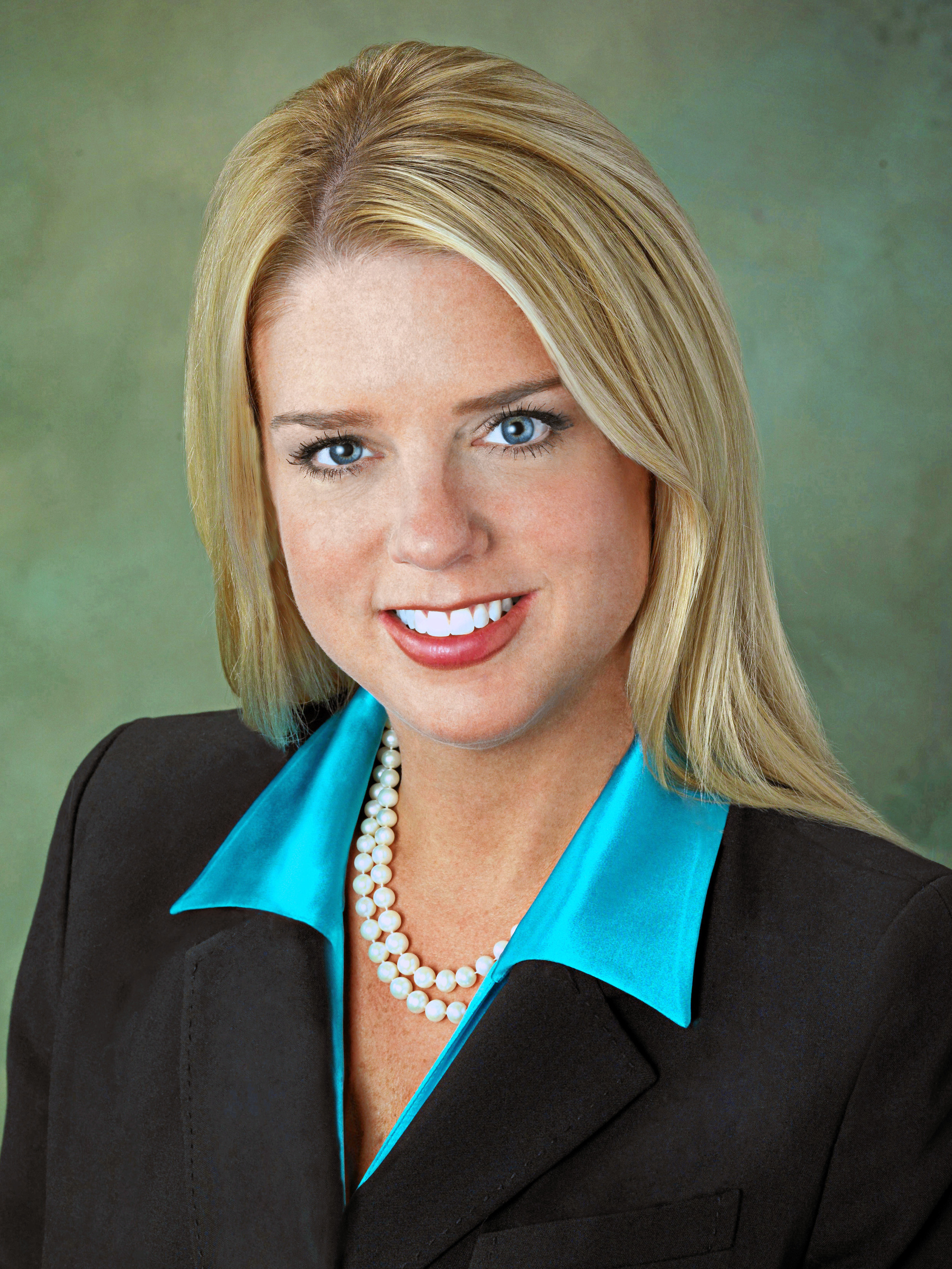

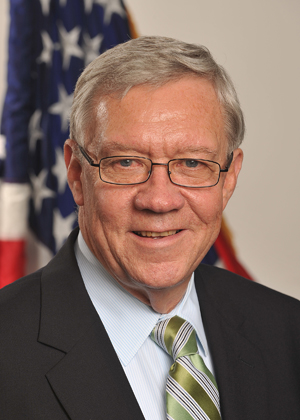
Nominee	Pam Bondi	George Sheldon
Party	Republican	Democratic
Popular vote	3,222,524	2,457,317
Percentage	55.09%	42.01%
- Bondi: 40–50% 50–60% 60–70% 70–80% Sheldon: 40–50% 50–60% 60–70% 70–80% 80–90%
Attorney General before election
Pam Bondi
Republican
Elected Attorney General
Pam Bondi
Republican

The 2014 Florida Attorney General election took place on November 4, 2014, to elect the Florida Attorney General. Incumbent Republican Attorney General Pam Bondi ran for re-election to a second term in office against Democrat George Sheldon and Libertarian Bill Wohlsifer.

== Republican primary ==
=== Candidates ===
==== Declared ====
- Pam Bondi, incumbent attorney general

== Democratic primary ==
=== Candidates ===
==== Declared ====
- George Sheldon, former Assistant U.S. Secretary of Health and Human Services for Children and Families
- Perry Thurston, Minority Leader of the Florida House of Representatives

==== Declined ====
- Skip Campbell, former state senator and nominee for attorney general in 2006
- Maria Sachs, state senator

==== Endorsements ====
George Sheldon

Individuals

- Pat Frank, Hillsborough County clerk of court
- Vic Torres, state representative

Organizations

- AFL–CIO
- Florida Alliance for Retired Americans
- Florida Nurses Association
- Florida Young Democrats
- International Union of Painters and Allied Trades
- National Organization for Women
- National Women's Political Caucus

Newspapers

- La Gaceta
- The Miami Herald
- The Palm Beach Post
- Tampa Bay Times
- Tampa Tribune
Perry Thurston

Individuals

- Rick Kriseman, Mayor of St. Petersburg
- Kendrick Meek, former U.S. Representative and nominee for U.S. Senate in 2010
- Darren Soto, state senator

Newspapers

- Orlando Sentinel
- Sun-Sentinel

=== Results ===
Democratic primary results
Party	Candidate	Votes	%
Democratic	George Sheldon	458,428	60.66
Democratic	Perry Thurston	297,320	39.34
Total votes		755,748	100

== Libertarian nomination ==
=== Candidates ===
==== Declared ====
- Bill Wohlsifer, Attorney at Law

== General election ==
=== Campaign ===
Sheldon's constitutional eligibility to serve as attorney general was challenged in court. For the years 2011 to 2013, Sheldon established permanent non-Florida residency in order to receive an exemption from taking continuing legal education courses required to maintain his law license with the Florida Bar. Article IV, Section 5(b) of the Florida Constitution requires the candidates for attorney general maintain permanent residency in Florida for the seven years preceding election to office. The lawsuit named Sheldon and the Florida Secretary of State as defendants, and asked the court to remove Sheldon from the Democratic primary for attorney general. Leon County Chief Judge Charles A. Francis ruled that Sheldon was eligible for the ballot, stating that though he might have worked out of state, he maintained his residence in Tallahassee and continued to live there whenever he returned. The main lawyer involved in the case chose not to appeal the decision.

After Sheldon won his party's primary on August 26, Bondi challenged him to a general debate before the election. Sheldon stated that he would do so, but raised the possibility of multiple debates. Wohlsifer also challenged Bondi and Sheldon to a debate before the election. On September 9, Bondi's campaign sent out an email accepting an invitation to debate Sheldon in October, which he also accepted. While the Bondi campaign's email only mentioned Sheldon, Sheldon himself stated that he would welcome Wohlsifer's participation. Later on, it was confirmed that the debate would take place on October 6 and all three candidates would participate. It was pre-recorded and then broadcast only in Tampa and Orlando TV markets.

=== Candidates ===
- Pam Bondi (Republican)
- George Sheldon (Democratic)
- Bill Wohlsifer (Libertarian)

==== Endorsements ====
Pam Bondi

Organizations

- Associated Industries of Florida
- Florida Chamber of Commerce
- Florida Home Builders Association
- Florida Medical Association
- Florida Police Chiefs Association
- Florida Professional Firefighters
- Florida Association of State Troopers
- Fraternal Order of Police
- National Federation of Independent Business
- Florida Police Benevolent Association

Newspapers

- The Florida Times-Union
- Tampa Tribune
George Sheldon

Individuals

- Bob Butterworth, former Florida Attorney General
- Pat Frank, Hillsborough County clerk of court
- Walt McNeil, Police Chief of Quincy and former Secretary of the Florida Department of Corrections
- Vic Torres, state representative

Organizations

- AFL–CIO
- Florida Alliance for Retired Americans
- Florida Nurses Association
- Florida Young Democrats
- International Union of Painters and Allied Trades
- National Organization for Women
- National Women's Political Caucus

Newspapers

- The Bradenton Herald
- The Miami Herald
- Orlando Sentinel
- The Palm Beach Post
- Sun-Sentinel
- Tallahassee Democrat
- Tampa Bay Times
Bill Wohlsifer

Individuals

- Gary Johnson, former Republican Governor of New Mexico and Libertarian nominee for President in 2012
- Michael C. Minardi, NORML Legal Committee member
- Roger Stone, author and political commentator
- Burnie Thompson, radio talk show host

Organizations

- Epilepsy Foundation
- IJC Law Group

Newspapers

- The Bradenton Times

=== Polling ===
Poll source	Date(s) administered	Sample size	Margin of error	Pam Bondi (R)	George Sheldon (D)	Bill Wohlsifer (L)	Undecided
Public Policy Polling	November 1–2, 2014	1,198	± 2.8%	46%	37%	5%	11%
Saint Leo University	October 16–19, 2014	500	± 4.9%	47%	39%	6%	8%
Public Policy Polling	September 4–7, 2014	818	± 3.8%	43%	35%	6%	17%
Gravis Marketing	June 20–23, 2014	1,232	± 3%	43%	35%	5%	16%
Public Policy Polling	June 6–9, 2014	672	± 3.8%	38%	35%	—	27%
Gravis Marketing	April 23–25, 2014	907	± 3%	45%	36%	7%	12%
Gravis Marketing	January 30–31, 2014	808	± 4%	44%	36%	4%	16%
Public Policy Polling	January 16–21, 2014	591	± 4%	37%	34%	—	29%
Gravis Marketing	November 8–11, 2013	932	± 3%	29%	11%	—	59%

Hypothetical polling

Poll source	Date(s) administered	Sample size	Margin of error	Pam Bondi (R)	Perry Thurston (D)	Other	Undecided
Gravis Marketing	June 20–23, 2014	1,232	± 3%	43%	38%	4%	15%
Public Policy Polling	June 6–9, 2014	672	± 3.8%	40%	33%	—	28%
Gravis Marketing	April 23–25, 2014	907	± 3%	45%	38%	7%	11%
Gravis Marketing	January 30–31, 2014	808	± 4%	45%	36%	6%	12%
Public Policy Polling	January 16–21, 2014	591	± 4%	37%	35%	—	28%
Gravis Marketing	November 8–11, 2013	932	± 3%	30%	14%	—	57%

=== Results ===
Florida Attorney General election, 2014
Party	Candidate	Votes	%	±%
Republican	Pam Bondi (incumbent)	3,222,524	55.09%	+0.32%
Democratic	George Sheldon	2,457,317	42.01%	+0.57%
Libertarian	Bill Wohlsifer	169,394	2.90%	N/A
Majority		765,207	13.08%	−0.25%
Turnout		5,849,205		
Republican hold				

==== By congressional district ====
Bondi won 19 of 27 congressional districts, including two that elected Democrats.

District	Bondi	Sheldon	Representative
1st	71%	26%	Jeff Miller
2nd	53%	43%	Gwen Graham
3rd	65%	32%	Ted Yoho
4th	68%	28%	Ander Crenshaw
5th	36%	62%	Corrine Brown
6th	64%	33%	Ron DeSantis
7th	56%	41%	John Mica
8th	62%	34%	Bill Posey
9th	48%	49%	Alan Grayson
10th	58%	38%	Daniel Webster
11th	66%	31%	Rich Nugent
12th	60%	37%	Gus Bilirakis
13th	53%	43%	Bill Young
14th	42%	55%	Kathy Castor
15th	60%	37%	Dennis Ross
16th	60%	37%	Vern Buchanan
17th	65%	32%	Tom Rooney
18th	57%	40%	Patrick Murphy
19th	67%	30%	Trey Radel
20th	20%	78%	Alcee Hastings
21st	43%	55%	Ted Deutch
22nd	47%	50%	Lois Frankel
23rd	40%	58%	Debbie Wasserman Schultz
24th	15%	84%	Frederica Wilson
25th	61%	37%	Mario Díaz-Balart
26th	52%	45%	Carlos Curbelo
27th	52%	46%	Ileana Ros-Lehtinen

== See also ==
- Florida Attorney General
