= Radiant Church =

American megachurch

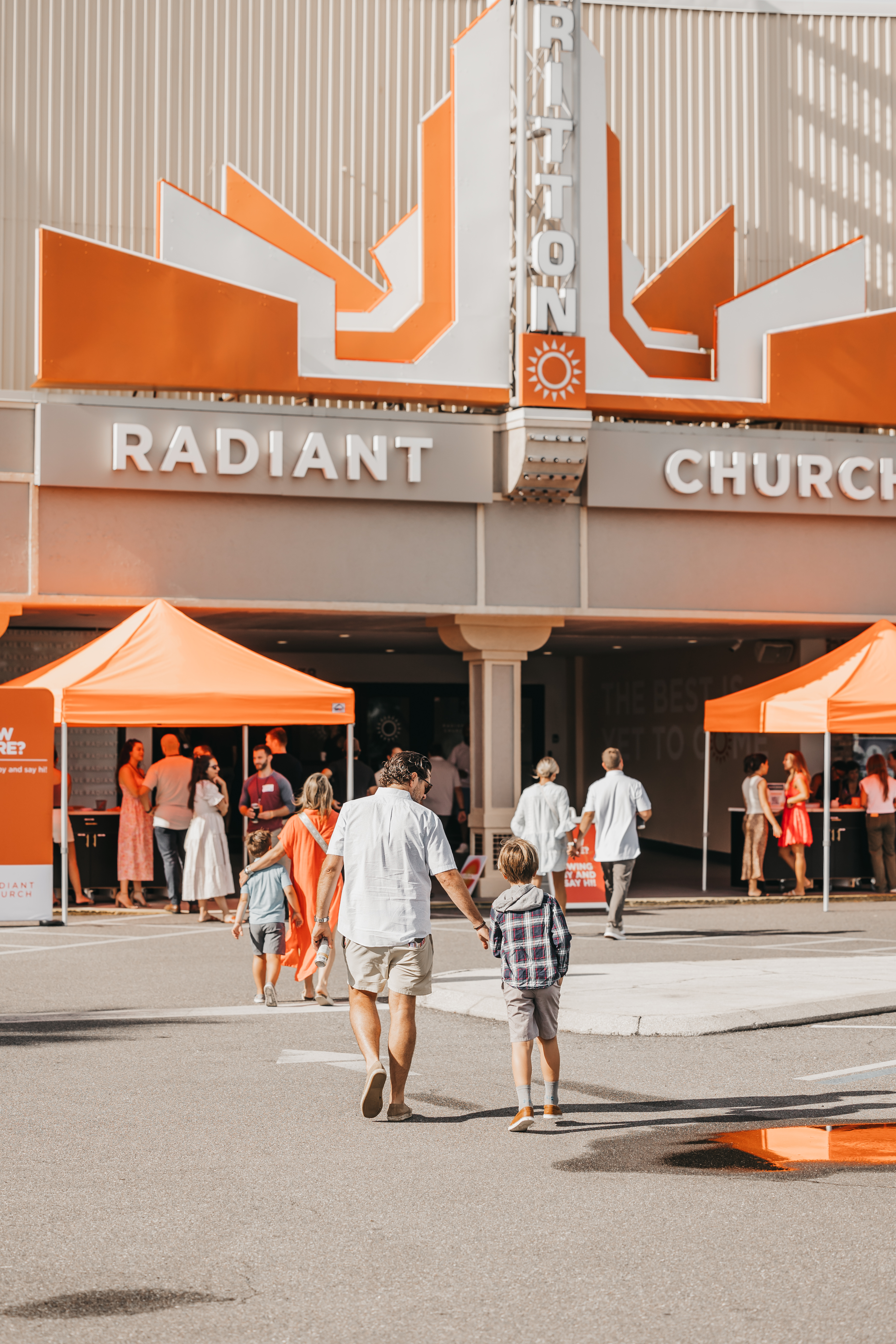
- Radiant Church in 2024
- Location: Tampa, Florida
- Country: United States
- Denomination: Non-denominational
- Website: weareradiant.com

History
- Founded: 2013

Radiant Church is an Evangelical non-denominational multi-site megachurch based in Tampa, Florida. Weekly church attendance was approximately 10,000 people in 2026. Radiant has 12 locations. Its senior pastor is Aaron Burke.

== History ==
Radiant Church was co-founded in 2013 by Aaron Burke, an ordained pastor in the Pentecostal Assemblies of God who obtained a doctorate in ministry, and his wife, Katie Burke. Aaron previously served as the youth pastor of Brownsville Assembly of God in Pensacola, Florida, for six years. The church began through the renting and renovation of the Britton 8 movie theater in Tampa, Florida. They funded the beginnings of the church through the sale of a thrift store Aaron owned, which he had initially purchased through his earnings from buying and selling used cars, and by raising funds from other religious entities, such as the Association of Related Churches and the Church Multiplication Network. Radiant Church started modestly, seeing an attendance of 348 to its launch sermon in September of 2013, going on to average under 200 guests in attendance through its early sermons.

In 2015, pastor Aaron Burke led a prayer during the ceremony of Florida Governor Rick Scott's second term in office at the request of Pam Bondi, who attended Radiant Church and was Florida's Attorney General at the time.

In 2016, Radiant Church opened its second campus at Blake High School in Tampa, Florida. Around that same time, the church was averaging over 1,200 guests in attendance.

In 2019, Radiant Church expanded through a merger with Driven Church, creating a new campus in Brandon, Florida. During the COVID-19 pandemic, the church created a fund and raised $300,000, distributing the sum to help those in financial need. It also introduced virtual small groups during that time. Additionally, amid racial tensions in 2020, the church's board approved a $50,000 endowment for its leadership college, seeking to support underrepresented students pursuing the study of ministry. By 2021, Radiant Church had grown to five locations, and by 2023, it had grown to eight.

Through May 2024, Radiant Church averaged approximately 8,000 guests across its 9 locations. The church focused on social media as a means to grow its congregation. Sermons delivered by the church are streamed and broadcast live to other satellite church locations, which have their own bands and worship programs. Additionally, Radiant Church hosts community-based, in-person events.

In January 2026, Radiant Church purchased property formerly occupied by iHeartMedia for the purpose of building a new church location. The church is expected to stay at its original Tampa location until 2027, when the plaza is to be demolished as part of a redevelopment of the area.

=== Mission trips ===
Upon Radiant Church's founding, pastor Aaron Burke led mission trips to Sri Lanka, which occurred up to four times a year. Burke had lived in the country in 2005, where he worked with children in orphanages.

=== Partnerships ===
In 2022, Radiant Church partnered with a local non-profit, Christmas for Fosters, providing a staging location for gifts to be distributed to foster children during the holiday season.

In 2024, the church partnered with Convoy of Hope to distribute nonperishables, water, and cleaning supplies to those affected by Hurricanes Helene and Milton.

== See also ==
- Church planting
- Evangelicalism in the United States
- List of megachurches in the United States
