= Black Knight, Inc. =

American data company

- Company type: Subsidiary
- Traded as: NYSE: BKI (2017–2023); NYSE: BKFS (2015–2017)
- Industry: Financial services
- Headquarters: Jacksonville, Florida, U.S.
- Key people: Anthony Jabbour (Chairman); Joe Nackashi (CEO); Kirk Larsen (President & CFO)
- Parent: Intercontinental Exchange
- Website: blackknightinc.com

Black Knight, Inc. is an American corporation that provides integrated technology, services, data and analytics to the mortgage lending, servicing and real estate industries, as well as the capital and secondary markets. Black Knight is also known for its monthly benchmark data reports: Mortgage Monitor, a month-end analysis of mortgage performance statistics derived from Black Knight's loan-level database representing the majority of the national mortgage market; and Originations Market Monitor, the industry's earliest and most comprehensive view of single-family residential mortgage originations based on daily rate lock data from Black Knight's Optimal Blue PPE. In 2023, Intercontinental Exchange acquired the company for $11.7 billion.

== Operations ==
The company's product offerings serve four primary market segments:

- Real estate
- Mortgage origination
- Mortgage servicing
- Capital and secondary markets

== Corporate evolution ==
1962 – Black Knight's earliest predecessor company, Computing and Statistical Services, (CSS) is founded in Jacksonville, Fla.

1969 – CSS incorporates under its new name: Computer Power Inc. (CPI).

1992 – ALLTEL Corporation purchases CPI, which becomes a part of ALLTEL Information Services. ALLTEL Information Services' financial services division provides technology applications for mortgage, banking and other financial services.

2003 – Fidelity National Financial (FNF) purchases ALLTEL Information Services, renames it Fidelity Information Systems (FIS), and relocates FNF's headquarters from Santa Barbara, Calif., to Jacksonville, Fla.

2006 – FNF spins off FIS into a separate company.

2008 – FIS spins off mortgage processing and services into Lender Processing Services, Inc. (LPS).

2008 – LPS acquires McDash Analytics, one of the largest loan-level mortgage performance databases, which becomes the basis for a new Applied Analytics division.

2014 – LPS is re-acquired by FBI and renamed Black Knight Financial Services.

2015 – Black Knight Financial Services begins trading on the New York Stock Exchange under the ticker symbol "BKFS."

2016 – Black Knight acquires eLynx and Motivity Solutions, creating the foundation for Black Knight's Origination Technologies division.

2017 – FNF liquidates its majority holding in Black Knight Financial Services, resulting in a new public company, Black Knight, Inc.

2018 – Black Knight acquires artificial intelligence, and machine learning (AI/ML) start-up HeavyWater and Ernst Publishing Co., a provider of mortgage fees and closing cost data for the real estate and home finance industries.

2019 – Black Knight acquires Compass Analytics, provider of lender pricing solutions and secondary market analytics.

2020 – Black Knight acquires Collateral Analytics, provider of real estate analytics tools and data, and Optimal Blue, creators of the mortgage industry's most widely used pricing engine.

2021 – Black Knight acquires broker-specific technology NexSpring Financial, LLC; eMBS, which provides performance data and analytics on agency-backed securities; and Top of Mind Networks, LLC, a mortgage industry focused marketing automation and customer relationship management (CRM) platform.

2022 – Intercontinental Exchange (ICE) agreed to acquire Black Knight for $13.1 billion in May.

2023 – ICE completed the acquisition of Black Knight for $11.7 billion.

== Controversies ==
The 2010 robo-signing scandal exposed questionable behavior on the part of employees of a small subsidiary of the company. In addition to the federal government, states such as Nevada filed legal proceedings against these employees. The investigation of these business practices were featured in an episode of 60 Minutes. Eventually LPS settled with the federal government and other states and ceased operations of the problematic subsidiary. Some controversy surrounded the resignation of two attorneys who had investigated LPS as part of their work for Florida's Economic Crime Division, as they claimed to have resigned under pressure from Attorney General Pam Bondi, who had received campaign contributions from LPS.

On November 4, 2019, Black Knight took the unprecedented step of taking legal action against one of its clients, PennyMac Financial Services for breach of contract and misappropriation of trade secrets. Within 24 hours, PennyMac had filed a retaliatory lawsuit against Black Knight for alleged anti-competitive practices. The PennyMac case has since been moved from the California court in which the mortgage lender and servicer had filed suit and to Florida, where Black Knight had filed the original complaint. The case went to arbitration in June 2020.
