= George Sheldon (Florida politician) =

American politician, Florida (1947–2018)

George H. Sheldon
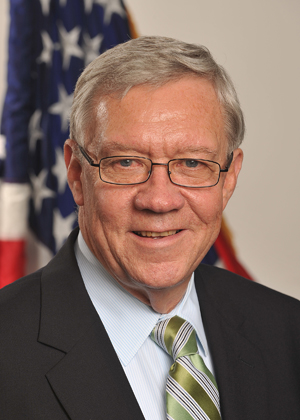

Secretary of the Florida Department of Children and Families
- In office 2008–2011
- Governor: Charlie Crist
- Preceded by: Bob Butterworth
- Succeeded by: David Wilkins

Member of the Florida House of Representatives from the 69th district
- In office November 5, 1974 – November 2, 1982
- Preceded by: Guy Spicola
- Succeeded by: Thomas Danson Jr.

Personal details
- Born: June 3, 1947 Wildwood, New Jersey, U.S.
- Died: August 23, 2018 (aged 71) Miami, Florida, U.S.
- Party: Democratic
- Education: Florida State University (BA, JD)
- Profession: Attorney

George Henry Sheldon (June 3, 1947 – August 23, 2018) was an American attorney and politician who served as a member of the Florida House of Representatives, as the secretary of the Florida Department of Children and Families, and as the acting assistant secretary at the federal Administration for Children and Families within the Department of Health and Human Services. A member of the Democratic Party, he ran unsuccessfully for Attorney General of Florida in 2014.

== Biography ==
George Sheldon was born in Wildwood, New Jersey, on June 3, 1947. He was raised in Plant City, Florida. He received both his B.A. and J.D. from Florida State University.

Sheldon's political career began in 1969, when he was a legislative aide for state senator and future governor Reubin Askew. Sheldon was a state representative in the Tampa area from 1974 to 1982, before running against Congressman Michael Bilirakis. Sheldon would serve in private practice until 1999, when he became Deputy Attorney General for Central Florida under Attorney General Bob Butterworth. In 2003, he assumed the post of Associate Dean at St Thomas University School of Law; and in 2008, Sheldon became the secretary of the Florida Department of Children and Families under governor Charlie Crist. While at Florida DCF, Sheldon played a key role in relief efforts for refugees from Haiti's 2010 earthquake. He was also recognized by a national child welfare coalition as leading the "largest transformation of an American child welfare system in recent decades, turning Florida from the national example of failure into, relatively speaking, a leader in doing child welfare right." Sheldon would later become the acting assistant secretary for the federal Administration for Children and Families in the United States Department of Health and Human Services from 2011 to 2013.

Sheldon was the Democratic nominee for Attorney General of Florida in the 2014 election, but lost to incumbent Republican Pam Bondi.

Sheldon died from complications of a fall in Miami, Florida, on August 23, 2018, at the age of 71.

Florida House of Representatives
Preceded by Guy Spicola	Member of the Florida House of Representatives from the 69th district November 19, 1974 – November 16, 1982	Succeeded by Thomas Danson Jr.
Party political offices
Preceded by Peter Rudy Wallace	Democratic nominee for Education Commissioner of Florida; 2000	Succeeded by None
Preceded by Dan Gelber	Democratic nominee for Attorney General of Florida; 2014	Succeeded by Sean Shaw
