= Joe Bondi =

American academic and politician (1936–2013)

Mayor of Temple Terrace
- In office 1974–1978

Member of the Temple Terrace City Council
- In office 1970–1974

Personal details
- Born: August 15, 1936
- Died: January 8, 2013 (aged 76)
- Party: Democratic
- Spouse: Patsy Hammer (m. 1963)
- Children: 3, including Pam
- Education: University of Florida

Military service
- Branch/service: United States Navy

Joseph C. Bondi Jr. (August 15, 1936 – January 8, 2013) was an American academic who contributed to the development of the modern American middle school. For 38 years, he was a professor of education at the University of South Florida.

Bondi served as city councilor and mayor of Temple Terrace, Florida, from 1970 to 1974 and 1974 to 1978, respectively. He was the father of former United States Attorney General Pam Bondi.

== Early life, education, and family ==
Bondi was born August 15, 1936. Raised in Tampa, Florida, he graduated from Hillsborough High School in 1954. He served in the United States Navy; and received his undergraduate, graduate, and doctorate degrees at the University of Florida.

Bondi was a younger cousin of Bob Bondi (who graduated from the same high school two years before him), who served on the city council of Tampa and unsuccessfully ran for mayor of Tampa in 1979.

Bondi married Patsy Hammer (an elementary school teacher) in 1960. The couple had their first of three children, daughter Pam, in 1965. They later had another daughter, Beth, and a son, Brad. The Bondis raised their children in the Tampa suburb of Temple Terrace, Florida, in a house located on Bannockburn Avenue and overlooking the greens of the Temple Terrace Golf and Country Club. Their eldest child, Pam, would in her adulthood serve as both Florida Attorney General and United States Attorney General.

== Career ==
=== Educator and academic ===
Bondi is considered a pioneer in early adolescent education, being a significant contributor to the development of the modern American middle school. He believed young adolescents, being distinct from younger and older age groups, required their own separate educational environment.

Bondi began his career as an educator in 1960. In his early career, Bondi worked as a teacher at Wilson Junior High School and Greco Junior High School. He served as Dean of Boys at Franklin Junior High School.

In 1965, he became a professor of education at the University of South Florida. He worked as a professor there for 38 years, retiring in 2003.

Bondi was an author of 25 educational textbooks on school curriculum. One of these works, Curriculum Development: A Guide to Practice (co-authored with Dr. Jon Wiles), was first published in 1979, earned wide praise and became required reading for many education courses. It saw an eighth edition published in 2010. Another work, The Essential Middle School, influenced school plans in many large school districts, including Dallas, St. Louis, and Miami.

Bondi served as a consultant to many Florida school districts; and ran the consulting firm Wiles, Bondi and Associates.

=== Politics ===
Bondi was a Democrat. From 1970 to 1974, Bondi served as a city councilor in Temple Terrace. From 1974 to 1978, he served as mayor. In 1975, he served as the inaugural chairman of the Hillsborough County Council of Governments. While he was mayor, a new library, recreation center, police department, and city hall were all established without any tax increases.

== Death ==
Bondi died on January 8, 2013, of leukemia at the age of 76. He had been diagnosed with the cancer the previous July.
