= Pam Bondi =

American attorney and politician (born 1965)

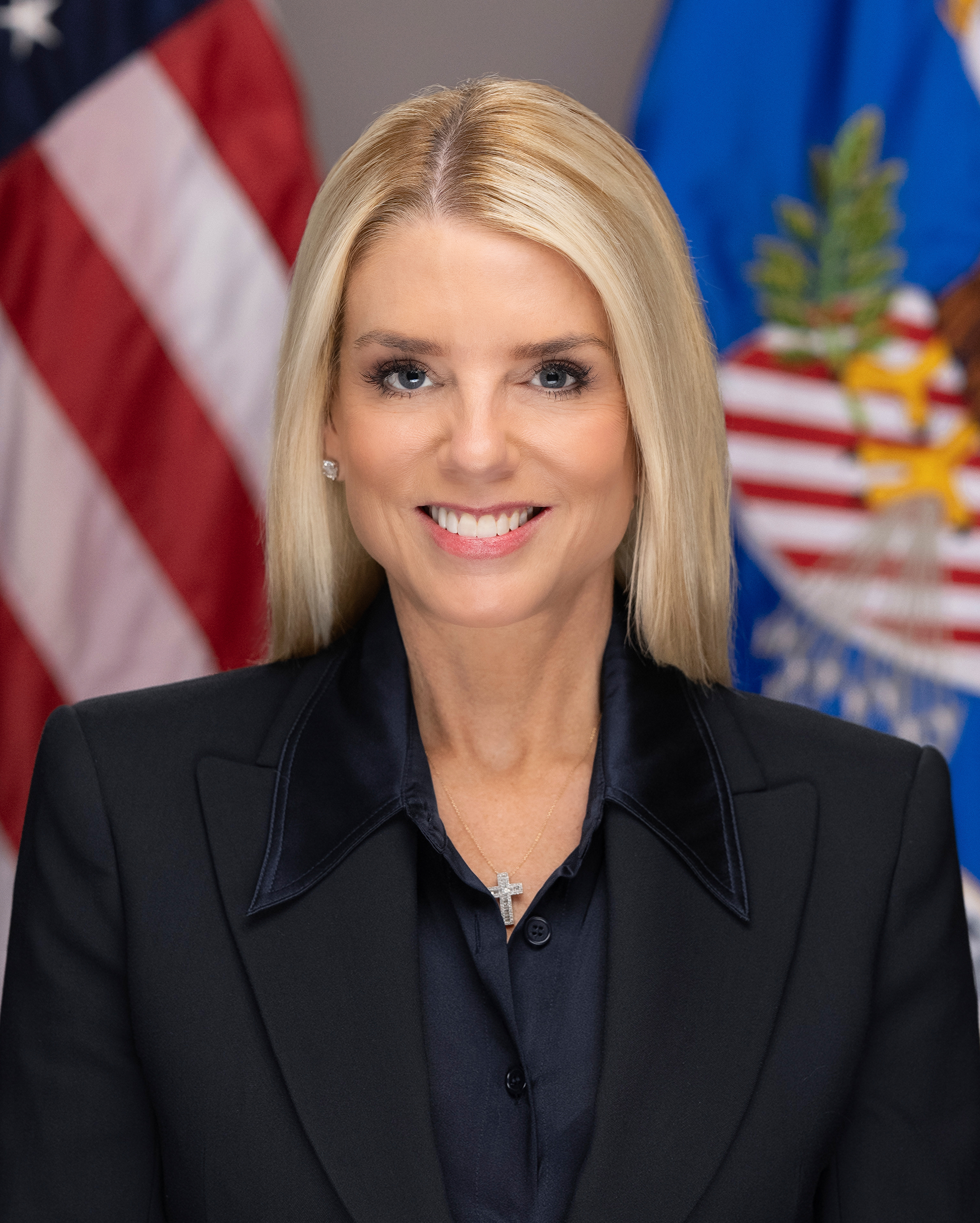
- Official portrait, 2025

87th United States Attorney General
- In office February 5, 2025 – April 2, 2026
- President: Donald Trump
- Deputy: Emil Bove (acting); Todd Blanche
- Preceded by: Merrick Garland
- Succeeded by: Todd Blanche

37th Florida Attorney General
- In office January 4, 2011 – January 8, 2019
- Governor: Rick Scott
- Preceded by: Bill McCollum
- Succeeded by: Ashley Moody

Personal details
- Born: Pamela Jo Bondi; November 17, 1965 (age 60) Tampa, Florida, U.S.
- Party: Republican (2000–present)
- Other political affiliations: Democratic (1984–2000)
- Spouses: Garret Barnes (m. 1990; div. 1992); Scott Fitzgerald (m. 1996; div. 2002)
- Domestic partner: John Wakefield (2017–present)
- Parent: Joe Bondi (father)
- Education: University of South Florida (attended); University of Florida (BA); Stetson University (JD)
- Bondi's voice Bondi on the files related to the death of Jeffrey Epstein. Recorded July 8, 2025

Pamela Jo Bondi (/ˈbɒndi/ BON-dee; born November 17, 1965) is an American attorney and politician who served as the 87th United States attorney general from 2025 to 2026. A member of the Republican Party, she served as the 37th Florida attorney general from 2011 to 2019.

Born and raised in the Tampa Bay area, Bondi graduated from the University of Florida and Stetson Law School. She served as an assistant state attorney in Hillsborough County, Florida, from 1994 to 2009. In 2010, Bondi was elected Florida attorney general, becoming the first woman to serve in the position. She was re-elected in 2014, becoming the first Republican to win a second term. She served the maximum of two four-year terms. In 2019 fellow Republican Ashley Moody was elected as state attorney general.

In 2020, Bondi was one of President Donald Trump's defense lawyers during his first impeachment trial. By 2024, she led the legal arm of the Trump-aligned America First Policy Institute. On November 21, 2024, President-elect Trump announced his intention to nominate Bondi for U.S. attorney general after former congressman Matt Gaetz withdrew from consideration. She was confirmed by the U.S. Senate in a 54–46 vote on February 4, 2025, and sworn in the next day.

In April 2026, after growing dissatisfaction over her lack of success prosecuting Trump's political opponents and handling of the Epstein files, Trump fired Bondi.

== Early life and education ==
Pamela Jo Bondi was born on November 17, 1965, the daughter of Joe Bondi and Patsy Loretta Bondi (née Hammer). Her hometown is Temple Terrace, Florida. Her father was an educator and entered politics, serving as a city council member and then as elected mayor of Temple Terrace. She is a graduate of C. Leon King High School in Tampa. She is of Italian and German descent. Bondi studied at the University of South Florida, received a BA in criminal justice from the University of Florida in 1987, and a JD from Stetson University College of Law in 1990. She was a member of the Delta Delta Delta sorority as an undergraduate student. Bondi was admitted to the Florida Bar on June 24, 1991.

== Early career ==
Bondi was a prosecutor and spokeswoman in Hillsborough County, Florida, where she was an assistant state attorney. Bondi prosecuted former Major League Baseball player Dwight Gooden in 2006 for violating the terms of his probation and for substance abuse. In 2007, Bondi also prosecuted the defendants in Martin Anderson's death.

== Florida attorney general (2011–2019) ==
=== Elections ===
Bondi ran in the 2010 Florida attorney general election, facing off against former state representative Holly Benson and lieutenant governor Jeff Kottkamp in the Republican primary. During the primary, Bondi was endorsed by former governor of Alaska Sarah Palin.

Polling conducted by Mason-Dixon in August 2010 found her leading both Benson and Kottkamp in the primary. She ultimately won the primary with 37.89% of the vote. In the general election, she faced Democratic nominee Dan Gelber, a former prosecutor who spent 10 years in the state legislature. She defeated Gelber to become the state's first female attorney general.

Bondi was re-elected in November 2014, receiving 55% of the vote. Her Democratic challenger George Sheldon, the former acting commissioner of the Administration for Children and Families, received 42%.

=== Tenure ===
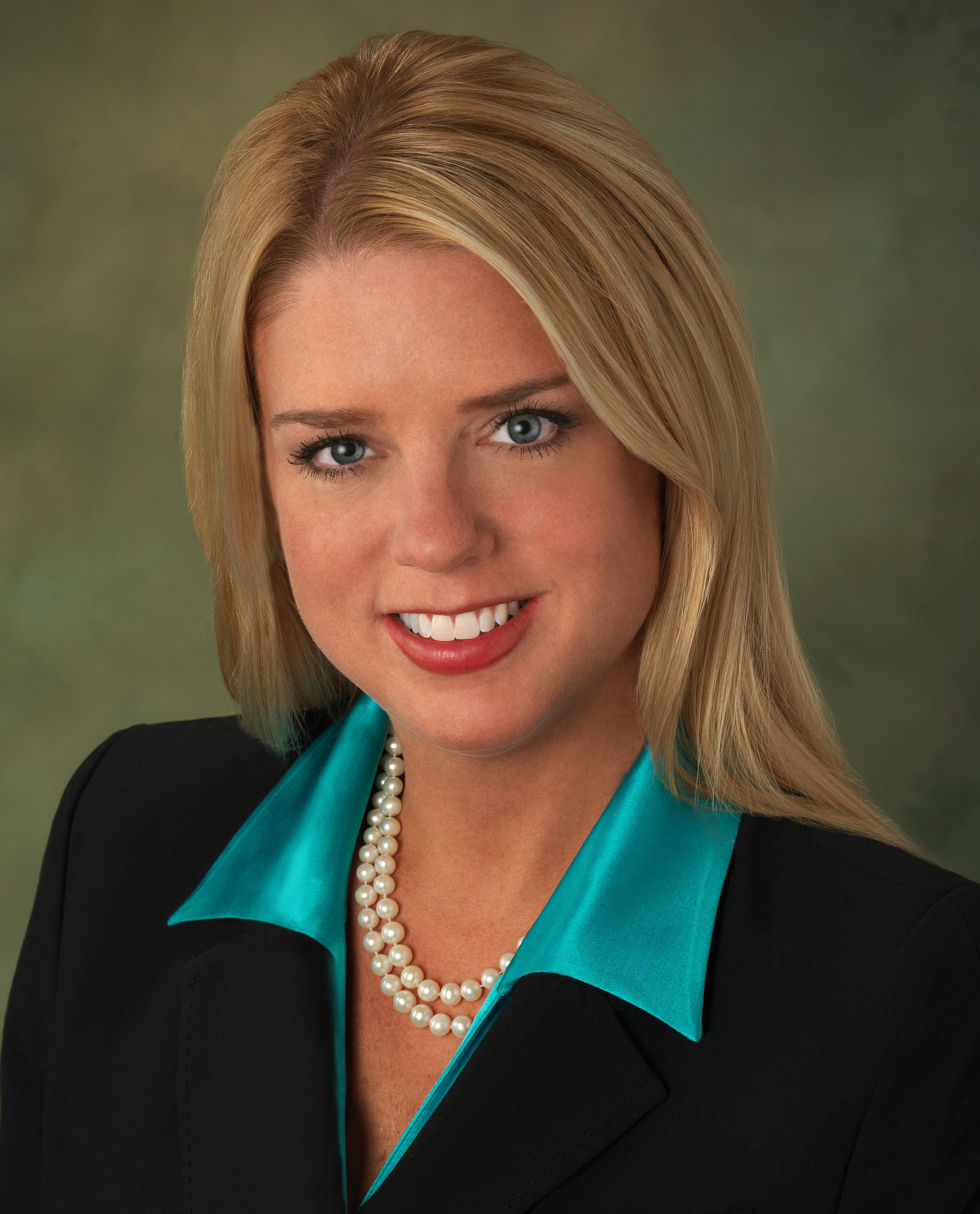
Official portrait, 2011

Bondi was the lead attorney general in an unsuccessful lawsuit seeking to overturn the Patient Protection and Affordable Care Act (also known as Obamacare) in Florida et al v. United States Department of Health and Human Services. In the lawsuit the state of Florida and 26 other states argued that the individual mandate provision of the ACA violates the United States Constitution.

In July 2011, Bondi pressured two attorneys to resign who were investigating Lender Processing Services, a financial services company now known as Black Knight, following the robosigning scandal, as part of their work for Florida's Economic Crime Division. In 2013, Bondi persuaded Governor Rick Scott to postpone a scheduled execution because it conflicted with a fundraising event. After questions were raised in the media, Bondi apologized for moving the execution date.

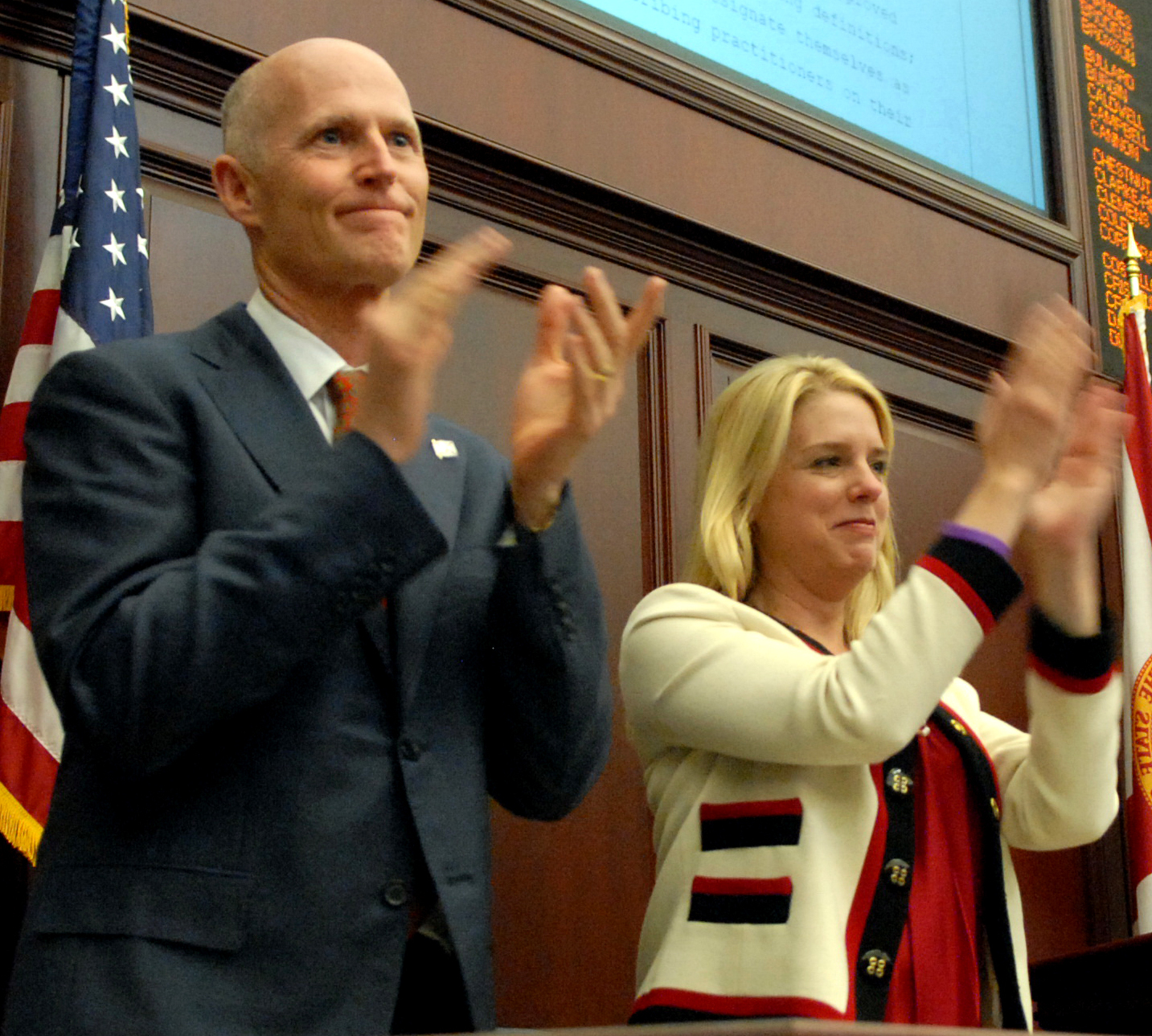
Bondi with Florida governor Rick Scott in 2011

Also in 2013, Bondi expressed her opposition to medical marijuana. In 2018, Bondi joined with 19 other Republican-led states in a lawsuit to overturn the ACA's bans on health insurance companies charging people with pre-existing conditions higher premiums or denying them coverage outright.

Bondi defended Amendment 2, a 2008 amendment to the Florida Constitution banning same-sex marriage, against legal challenges on behalf of the state. Bondi said that these actions did not reflect her opinions on same-sex marriage, but were out of respect for the constitution. Following the 2016 Orlando nightclub shooting in June 2016, Bondi was interviewed by CNN reporter Anderson Cooper, who said that Bondi's expression of support for the LGBT community was at odds with her past record.

In August 2018, while still serving as Florida attorney general, Bondi co-hosted The Five on Fox News three days in a row while also appearing on Sean Hannity's Fox News show. Fox News claimed that the Florida Commission on Ethics had approved Bondi's appearance on the program; however, the spokeswoman for the commission denied that, telling the Tampa Bay Times that no decision was made by the commission and that the commission's general counsel did not make a determination whether or not Bondi's appearance as a host violated the Florida Code of Ethics. The Tampa Bay Times described it as "unprecedented" for a sitting elected official to host a TV show.

==== Trump donation to Bondi PAC ====
In 2013, Bondi received scrutiny following a campaign donation from Donald Trump. Prior to the donation, Bondi had received at least 22 fraud complaints regarding Trump University. A spokesperson for Bondi announced that her office was considering joining a lawsuit initiated by Eric Schneiderman, the attorney general of New York, regarding potential tax fraud charges against Trump. Four days later, And Justice for All, a political action committee established by Bondi to support her re-election, received a $25,000 donation from the Donald J. Trump Foundation. Bondi subsequently declined to join the lawsuit against Trump University. Both Bondi and Trump have defended the propriety of the donation.

In 2016, after Citizens for Responsibility and Ethics in Washington (CREW) filed a complaint with the Internal Revenue Service regarding the donation, the Trump Foundation stated that it had been made in error, intending for the donation to go to Bondi's unrelated Kansas non-profit Justice for All. In June 2016, as Bondi was facing renewed criticism over the issue, her spokesman said that Bondi had solicited the donation directly from Trump several weeks before her office announced it was considering joining the lawsuit. On March 14, 2016, Bondi endorsed Trump in the 2016 Florida Republican presidential primary, saying she had been friends with him for many years. In June 2016, a spokesperson for Governor Rick Scott stated that the state's ethics commission was looking into the matter.

In September 2016, the IRS determined that the donation to Bondi's PAC violated laws against political contributions from nonprofit organizations, and ordered Trump to pay a fine for the contribution. Trump was also required to reimburse the foundation for the sum that had been donated to Bondi. Neither Bondi nor her PAC were fined or criminally charged. In November 2019, Trump was ordered by a New York state court to close down the foundation and pay $2 million in damages for misusing it, including the illegal donation to Bondi.

== Return to private life ==
=== Lobbying work ===
In 2019, after her final term as Florida attorney general, Bondi was hired by Ballard Partners and she began working as a registered foreign agent and lobbyist for Qatar. Her work with Qatar was related to anti-human-trafficking efforts in advance of the 2022 FIFA World Cup. She left the Qatari project in 2019 to work in a temporary position for the White House Counsel for President Trump's first impeachment proceedings.

As a partner at Ballard Partners, she also became a lobbyist for KGL KSCC, a company incorporated in Kuwait. Bondi was lobbying for the Kuwaiti company to help with a case of claimed extortion. During her time at Ballard Partners, Bondi lobbied for for-profit prison operator GEO Group, Amazon, Uber, General Motors, the Florida Sheriffs Association and others.

=== Trump's first impeachment proceedings ===
In November 2019, she was hired by the first Trump administration to help the White House during Trump's first impeachment proceedings. Her position was described the following month as being to "attack the process" of the impeachment inquiry. On January 17, 2020, Bondi was named as part of Trump's defense team for the Senate impeachment trial.

During the course of the impeachment trial, Bondi made allegations that former vice president Joe Biden and his son Hunter were involved in corruption in Ukraine, stemming from the younger Biden's position on the board of Burisma Holdings. It was also revealed that Lev Parnas, a businessman with close ties to Rudy Giuliani and Ukraine, had several meetings with Bondi in 2018 while she was the Florida attorney general, and after she left office in 2019.

=== 2020 presidential election ===
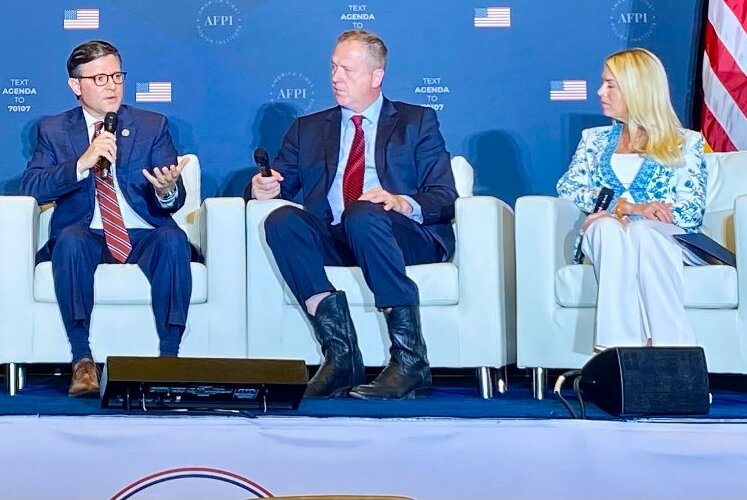
Bondi with Louisiana Congressman Mike Johnson and Missouri attorney general Eric Schmitt in 2022

Bondi spoke in support of Trump at the 2020 Republican National Convention. Bondi became a vocal supporter of Trump's efforts to overturn his 2020 defeat. While ballots were being counted in the 2020 United States presidential election, Bondi supported Trump's false claim that there was large-scale voter fraud in Georgia, Pennsylvania, and Wisconsin. In an appearance on Fox News on November 5, 2020, host Steve Doocy challenged Bondi to provide evidence for her claims of fraud. She said "We know that ballots have been dumped." Bondi later claimed that Trump had won Pennsylvania, despite votes there still being counted, with his opponent Joe Biden ultimately winning the state.

=== Board of trustees and advocacy work ===
During the following lame-duck session, Trump appointed Bondi to the board of trustees of the John F. Kennedy Center for the Performing Arts. The Palm Beach Post described the appointment as a reward for her loyalty to Trump. By 2024, Bondi led the legal arm of the Trump-aligned America First Policy Institute, a nonprofit that planned policies for a potential second Trump presidency. She worked to file voting lawsuits in battleground states relating to the 2024 presidential election.

== United States attorney general (2025–2026) ==
=== Nomination and confirmation ===
On November 21, 2024, president-elect Trump announced Bondi would be nominated for United States attorney general, after the withdrawal of Matt Gaetz for that position. There were two hearings at the U.S. Senate Committee on the Judiciary, one on January 15, 2025, and the second one on January 16. Bondi was questioned by Democratic Senators over her past work as a lobbyist, the 2020 presidential election results, her relationship with Trump, and her thoughts about TikTok.

On January 29, the Senate Judiciary Committee approved her nomination in a party-line 12–10 vote. She was confirmed in a 54–46 Senate vote on February 4. The only Democratic senator who voted "aye" was Senator John Fetterman. Bondi disclosed to the Senate Judiciary committee and the designated ethics official at the U.S. Department of Justice the compensation for her consulting services to Renatus Advisors LLC of Puerto Rico in shares and stock warrants for the merger of Digital World Acquisition Corp. (DWAC) and Trump Media & Technology Group (DJT), which were in turn converted to shares and warrants of DJT on the day of the merger. The compensation for the consulting services totaled $2,969,563.

=== Tenure ===
President Trump swears in Bondi as attorney general; February 5, 2025.

On February 5, 2025, Supreme Court justice Clarence Thomas swore Bondi into office as the 87th attorney general. On Bondi's first day in office, she shut down the FBI's Foreign Influence Task Force, shut down the DOJ's Task Force KleptoCapture, and cut back enforcement of the Foreign Agents Registration Act. Bondi largely took an implementation role as attorney general, with key decisions being made by Deputy Chief of Staff Stephen Miller and other White House officials.

In March 2025, Bondi announced the establishment of the Joint Task Force October 7 (JTF 10–7) to seek justice for victims of the October 7, 2023, attacks on Israel by Hamas, which killed approximately 1,200 people, including 47 U.S. citizens, and saw about 250 others abducted, including eight Americans. The task force was created to focus on prosecuting the perpetrators of the attack, pursuing charges against Hamas leadership, and targeting individuals and entities providing support or financing to Hamas, related Iranian proxies, and affiliates. Following the United States government group chat leak in March 2025, Bondi indicated that the leak would not be investigated, saying that the information shared was not classified.

On April 1, 2025, Bondi directed federal prosecutors to seek the death penalty in the Luigi Mangione case.

On May 12, 2025, Bondi convened a task force on anti-Christian bias.

On May 15, 2025, it was reported that Bondi sold at least $1 million worth of shares in Trump Media on "Liberation Day".

On June 5, 2025, a coalition of attorneys brought ethics complaints against Bondi. However, the Florida Bar said it would not investigate Bondi while she was in office. On May 27, 2026, after Bondi had left office, the coalition of more than 120 attorneys, led by former Florida Supreme Court Chief Justice Peggy Quince, filed a new and expanded complaint.

On September 9, 2025, in response to the killing of Iryna Zarutska, Bondi said she would seek the death penalty for the perpetrator and that he would "never again see the light of day as a free man".

On September 19, 2025, in the aftermath of the assassination of Charlie Kirk, Bondi said, "We will absolutely target you, go after you, if you are targeting anyone with hate speech." Her comments were criticized across the political spectrum, and the next day she clarified that she was referring to hate speech only involving threats of violence.

On October 7, 2025, Bondi testified before the Senate Judiciary Committee in what NPR described as a "... that often turned combative." Democrats accused Bondi of politicizing the Justice Department, while Republicans defended her actions and Committee Chairman Chuck Grassley commended her for "resetting priorities." Bondi called the Arctic Frost investigation a "historic betrayal of public trust" and said it represented "an unconstitutional, undemocratic abuse of power."

==== Immigration and drug enforcement ====
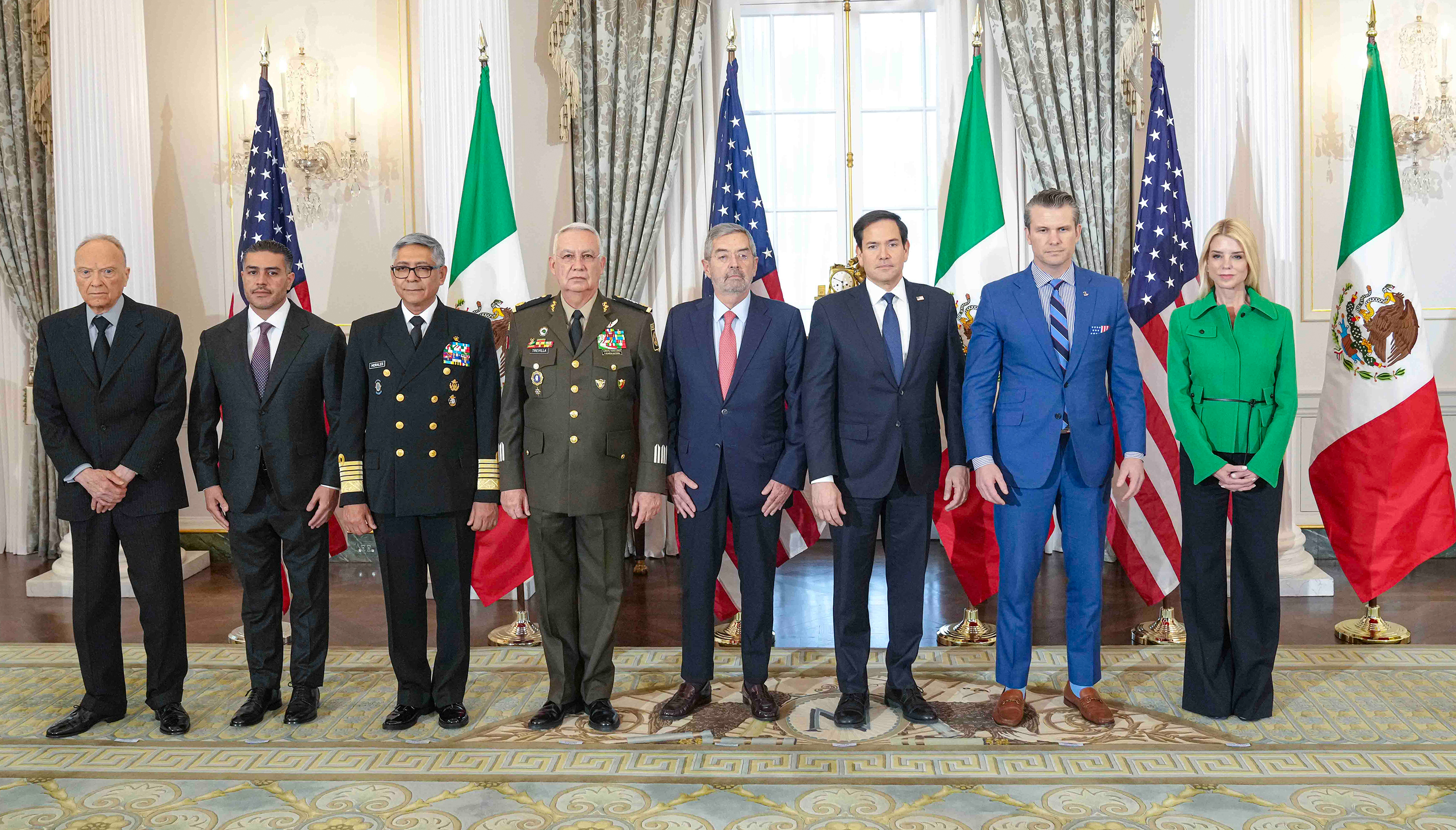
U.S.–Mexico interagency meeting in Washington, D.C., February 27, 2025

In March 2025, Chief Judge James Boasberg of the federal district court in D.C. issued an order to temporarily block the Trump administration from using the Alien Enemies Act to deport alleged members of the Venezuelan gang Tren de Aragua. He also orally ordered the deportation flights "to be returned to the United States", to be "complied with immediately"; however, the Trump administration completed the deportations anyway, with Bondi and other Justice Department officials later arguing in a March 17 legal filing that "an oral directive is not enforceable as an injunction".

Bondi and other Justice Department officials then submitted a March 18 legal filing stating that the cancelation of deportation flights ordered by Boasberg, had "no justification to order the provision of additional information, and that doing so would be inappropriate". During a media interview on March 19, Bondi said regarding Boasberg: "this judge has no right to ask those questions" regarding details about the deportation flights, and has "no power" to order the Trump administration to stop the deportation flights, as Bondi declared that judges are "meddling in our government".

On April 2025, Bondi said that fentanyl seizures in the first 100 days of Trump's second term as president had saved 21 million lives. Two days later, she increased this estimate to 119 million. During a subsequent cabinet meeting, she said that during the same period, DOJ agencies had seized "3,400 kilos of fentanyl...which saved—are you ready for this, media?—258 million lives." These statistics were criticized, as only 70,000 fentanyl deaths occur in the U.S. each year, and the claim of lives saved represents 75% of the total U.S. population.

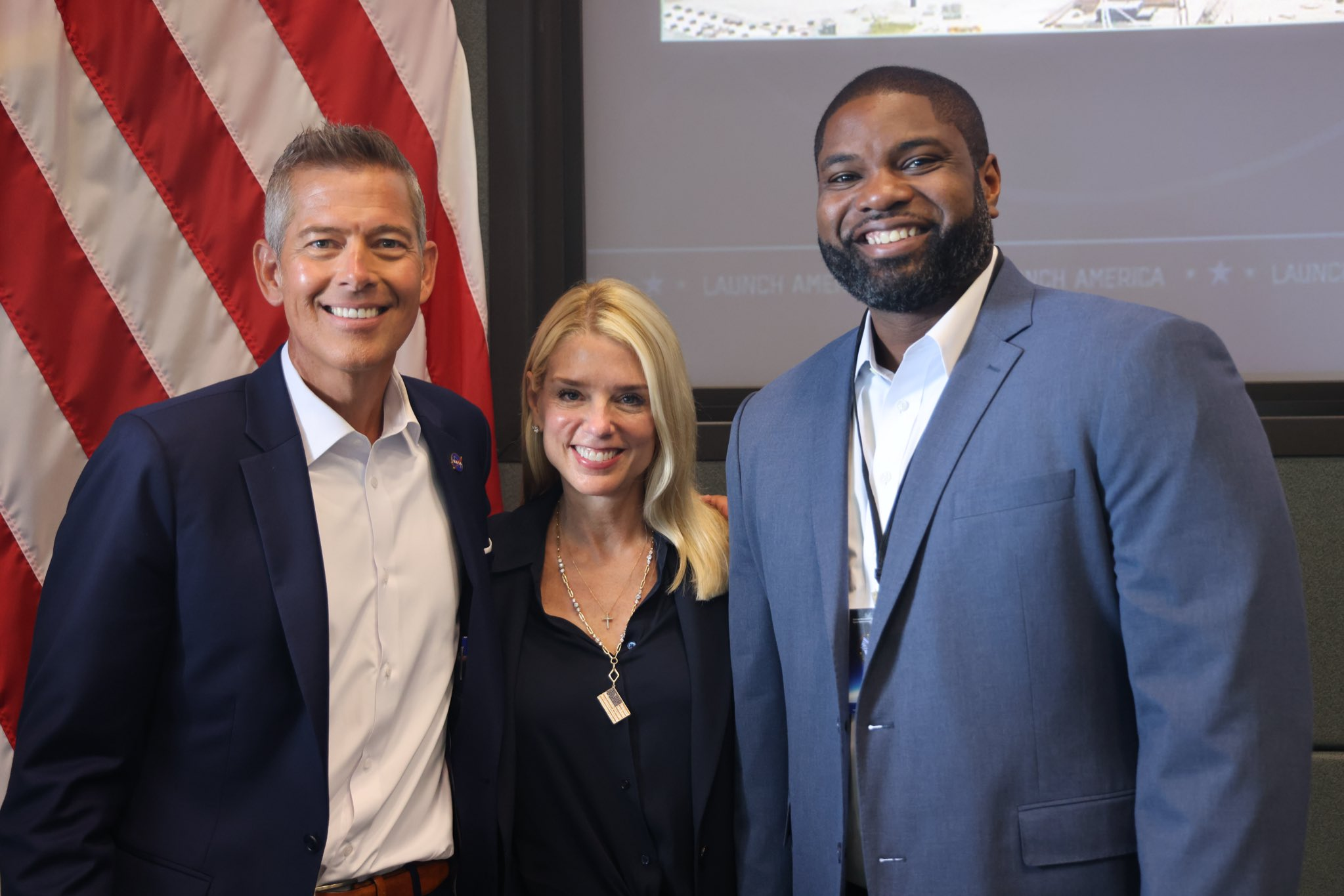
Bondi with Secretary Sean Duffy and Congressman Byron Donalds, July 31, 2025

In August 2025, Bondi announced on Twitter that the Department of Justice and the United States Department of State were increasing the reward to $50 million for Nicolás Maduro, accusing the Venezuelan president of collaborating with foreign terrorist organizations, such as Tren de Aragua, the Sinaloa Cartel, and the Cartel of the Suns, to bring deadly violence to the United States. Maduro was previously indicted by the first Trump administration in 2020, along with other Venezuelan officials and former Colombian FARC members, for what it described as "narco-terrorism": the trafficking of cocaine to the United States to wage a health war on its citizens. The reward was originally set at $15 million in March 2020 before being raised to $25 million by the Biden administration in January 2025.

Bondi stated that the DOJ had seized approximately $700 million in assets linked to Maduro, including multiple luxury homes in Florida, a mansion in the Dominican Republic, private jets, vehicles, a horse farm, jewelry, and large sums of cash. Bondi described Maduro's government as an "organized crime operation" that continued to function despite the seizures.

Hours after Maduro was captured in Venezuela by the US military on January 3, 2026, Bondi announced that he and his wife Cilia Flores had been indicted in the Southern District of New York on charges related to "narcoterrorism". The indictment listed the charges as narco-terrorism conspiracy, cocaine importation conspiracy, possession of machine guns and destructive devices, and conspiracy to possess machine guns and destructive devices. The amended indictment did not refer to the Cartel of the Suns as an organized group as previously alleged by the US, but instead as a corrupt patronage system, which aligns with experts' descriptions of its operations.

==== Election fraud ====
Beginning in 2025, at the direction of Bondi, forty U.S. states were requested to share citizen voter data for the purposes of reviewing state compliance with election laws. Bondi's lawsuit to release the voter rolls in California was dismissed in January 2026. Other judges in Georgia, Oregon, and Michigan also moved to dismiss the federal government's lawsuits given a total lack of evidence or support for the request.

In January 2026 during the Minnesota protests against ICE, Bondi requested governor Tim Walz to share the state's voter rolls, including information on individuals who receive public assistance in that state, saying it would be beneficial to ICE. The case was dismissed.

In February 2026, an FBI raid was conducted on a Fulton County, Georgia election office after a judge ruled Bondi's written demand for voter rolls in the state was unsubstantiated and dismissed. Bondi continued to publicly state the importance of investigating election fraud.

==== Epstein files ====
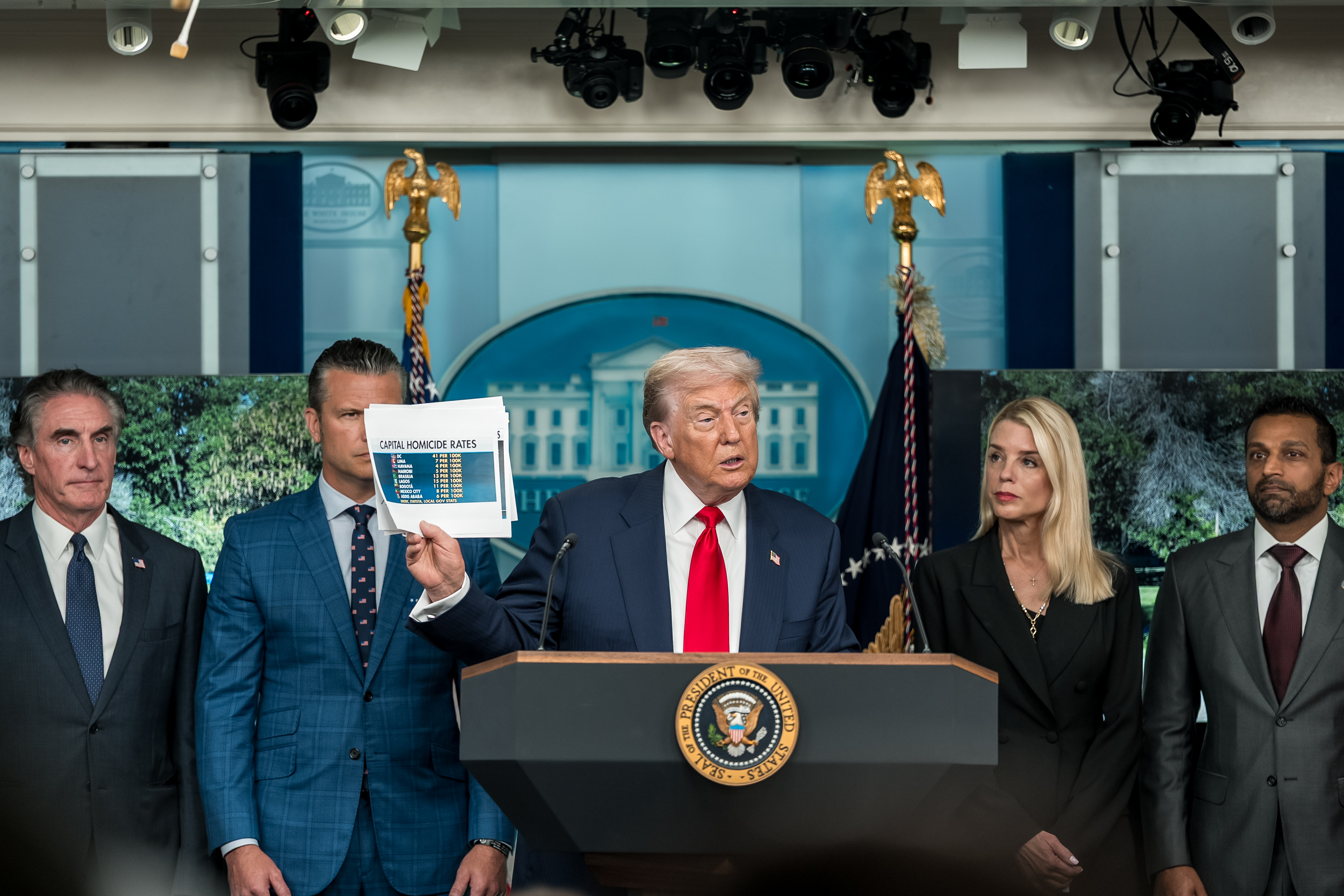
President Trump, Bondi and FBI Director Kash Patel (far right) in a press conference on crime in Washington, D.C. in August 2025

In late February 2025, a number of files related to Jeffrey Epstein were released, heavily redacted and offering little new information. Bondi was criticized for her handling of the release, with commentators on the right and left labeling the move a political stunt rather than a genuine effort at transparency. Arwa Mahdawi, writing for The Guardian, derided the release as "a lot of redacted nothing".

In July 2025, the Department of Justice and the FBI wrote a memo saying there was no evidence that a supposed list of Epstein's clients existed. Previously in February 2025, Fox News journalist John Roberts had asked Bondi if the Justice Department would be publishing "the list of Jeffrey Epstein's clients", to which Bondi responded: "It's sitting on my desk right now to review. That's been a directive by President Trump. I'm reviewing that." Bondi also previously claimed there were "tens of thousands of videos" showing Epstein "with children or child porn," a claim later walked back by FBI Director Kash Patel. The contradictions drew criticism from some figures in the MAGA movement.

Following the controversy, deputy director of the FBI Dan Bongino considered resigning from his position due to his disagreement with Bondi over how the Justice Department handled the announcement of its decision not to release further records related to Epstein. President Trump then defended Bondi by posting on Truth Social that she was doing "a FANTASTIC JOB". The Wall Street Journal later reported that, during a briefing on the Justice Department's review of the files in May, Bondi informed Trump that his name was included among the documents.

Bondi testifying before the House Judiciary Committee, where she is questioned on the Epstein files; February 11, 2026.

Bondi was summoned for a House Judiciary Committee oversight hearing on February 11, 2026. The hearing was described by news outlets as a "clash" between Bondi and Democratic representatives, with the notable exception of Republican representative Thomas Massie, who criticized Bondi and the DOJ for redaction failures.

During the hearing, when Bondi was asked how many of Epstein's accomplices she had indicted, to which Bondi stated, "The Dow is over 50,000 right now. The S&P at almost 7,000 and the Nasdaq smashing records. Americans' 401Ks and retirements are booming. That's what we should be talking about." This comment received significant criticism. Bondi also refused to respond to questions related to the department's ongoing investigation of any co-conspirators previously identified. According to an internal memo, the Department of Justice closed any ongoing investigations into co-conspirators in July 2025.

On February 14, 2026, Bondi stated that all the materials required to be released under the Epstein Transparency Act had been released to the public. Bondi also stated the department declined to publish the remaining files, citing client attorney privileges.

On April 29, Bondi agreed to appear before the U.S. House Oversight Committee to discuss how the Justice Department had handled the Epstein files. Bondi testified on May 29.

Bondi has said that she hopes Ghislaine Maxwell dies in prison, calling her "a monster, just like Jeffrey Epstein."

=== Removal ===
On April 1, 2026, The New York Times reported that Trump was considering firing Bondi and replacing her with Environmental Protection Agency administrator Lee Zeldin. On April 2, Trump announced he had fired Bondi, which was reportedly due to dissatisfaction with her failed prosecutions into Trump's political opponents and handling of the Epstein files.

== Personal life ==
Bondi's first voter registration was with the Democratic Party in 1984; she changed her registration to Republican in 2000. In a 2010 interview, Bondi said she had "always been conservative".

Bondi married Garret Barnes in 1990; the couple divorced after 22 months of marriage. In 1996, Bondi married Scott Fitzgerald; they divorced in 2002. She was engaged to Greg Henderson in 2012. Since 2017, she has been in a relationship with John Wakefield. Her younger brother is a lawyer.

Bondi is a Christian, attending sermons hosted by Radiant Church beginning in 2014. On her request, Radiant's pastor, Aaron Burke, led a prayer during the ceremony of then-Florida Governor Rick Scott's second term in office.

In October 2025, a man with an existing criminal record was arrested and charged with offering a $45,000 bounty to kill Bondi. The suspect posted on TikTok that he wanted Bondi "dead or alive" but "preferably dead".

In May 2026, CNN reported that Bondi was diagnosed with thyroid cancer and stated that she was recovering from it after undergoing treatment, including a surgery a few weeks prior.

== Electoral history ==
2010 Florida Attorney General election, Republican primary
Party	Candidate	Votes	%	±%
Republican	Pam Bondi	459,022	37.89%	N/A
Republican	Jeff Kottkamp	397,781	32.84%	N/A
Republican	Holly Benson	354,573	29.27%	N/A
Majority		61,241	5.05%	N/A
Turnout		1,211,376		

2010 Florida Attorney General election, General election
Party	Candidate	Votes	%	±%
Republican	Pam Bondi	2,882,868	54.77%	+2.08%
Democratic	Dan Gelber	2,181,377	41.44%	−5.87%
Independent	Jim Lewis	199,147	3.78%	N/A
Majority		701,491	13.33%	+7.95%
Turnout		5,263,392		

2014 Florida Attorney General election, General election
Party	Candidate	Votes	%	±%
Republican	Pam Bondi	3,222,524	55.09%	+0.32%
Democratic	George Sheldon	2,457,357	42.01%	+0.57%
Libertarian	Bill Wohlsifer	169,394	2.90%	N/A
Majority		765,207	13.08%	−0.25%
Turnout		5,849,235		

== See also ==
- List of female justice ministers
- List of female state attorneys general in the United States
- List of female United States Cabinet members
- List of first women lawyers and judges in Florida

Party political offices
Preceded by Bill McCollum	Republican nominee for Florida Attorney General; 2010, 2014	Succeeded by Ashley Moody
Legal offices
Preceded by Bill McCollum	Florida Attorney General; 2011–2019	Succeeded by Ashley Moody
Preceded by Merrick Garland	United States Attorney General; 2025–2026	Succeeded by Todd Blanche
Order of precedence
Preceded by Kristi Noem as Former U.S. Cabinet Member	Order of precedence of the United States as Former U.S. Cabinet Member	Succeeded by Lori Chavez-DeRemer as Former U.S. Cabinet Member
