= Britton Plaza Shopping Center =

Shopping plaza in Tampa, Florida

Coordinates: 27.906527°N 82.504152°W

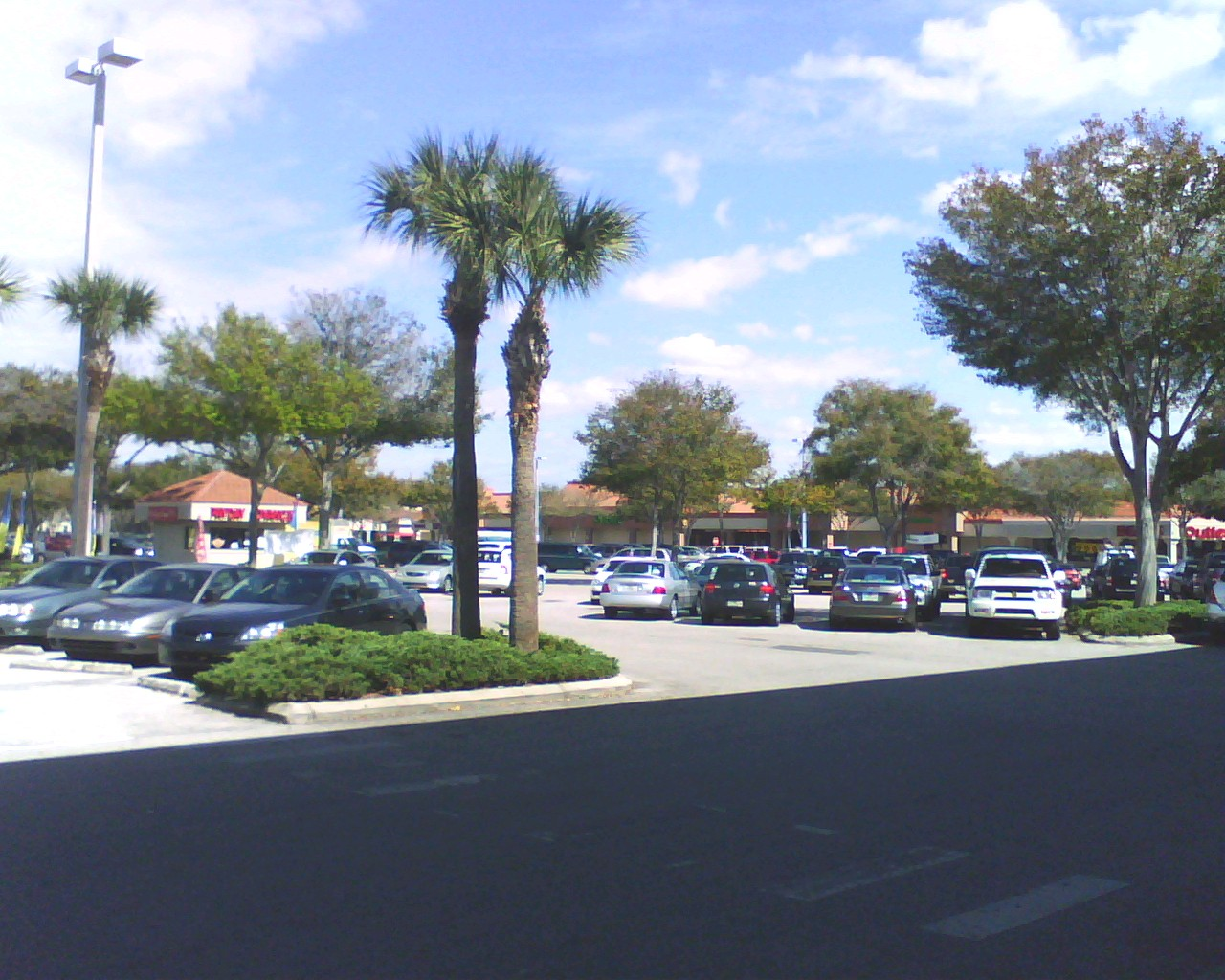
Britton Plaza on a typical weekend afternoon.

Britton Plaza Shopping Center is a 522,689-square-foot (48,559.4 m^{2}) open-air shopping plaza in the Fair Oaks - Manhattan Manor neighborhood of Tampa, Florida (on the corner of Dale Mabry Highway and Euclid Avenue). The plaza was built in 1956 and includes these anchors: Publix Super Market, Bealls Outlet, Tuesday Morning, Stein Mart, Burlington Coat Factory, Marshalls, Michaels, and Big Lots, as well as a GNC, Taco Bell, and a variety of local stores including The Perfect Gift which opened in 2011. The plaza also has an eight-screen theater, operated by Five Star Cinemas, which reopened in August 2009.. The theater was previously operated by Regal Entertainment in the mid-1990s and later Zota Theatres during the early and mid-2000s. Additionally, Fashion Bug closed its Britton Plaza store in March 2009, and China Garden Super Buffet closed its doors in June to prepare for an expansion. It reopened as the Tampa Buffet on November 29, 2009, and includes expanded dining facilities and buffet selection. In February 2011, Walgreens moved across the street; (Pet Supermarket will occupy the former space during the first quarter of 2012), and in April 2011, Plato's Closet opened in the old Fashion Bug storefront (the other half of the former Fashion Bug storefront has been occupied by Five Dollar Fashions since 2009).

== History ==
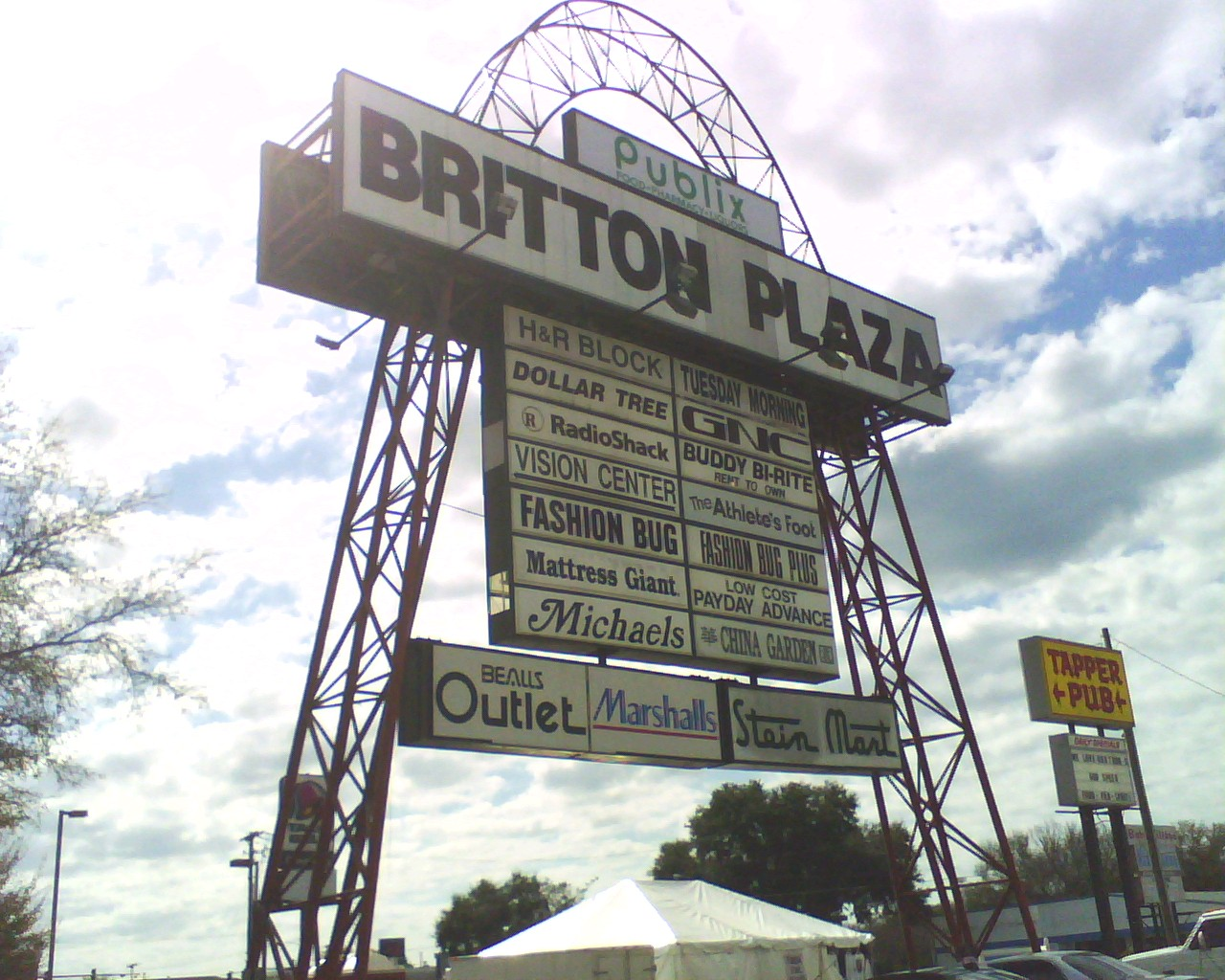
The landmark Britton Plaza sign on Dale Mabry Highway.

When the shopping center opened in 1956, Publix was among the original tenants, along with several other stores, including, J.C. Penney, National Shirt Shops, W.T. Grant, Neisners, Thom McAn, Jarman Shoes, Baker Shoes, Western Auto, Continental House and Rexall Drugs to name a few. The entire plaza was decorated in 1950s art-deco styling and included a nicely decorated courtyard. An elaborate sign, reminiscent of the old Florida style was erected alongside Dale Mabry Highway and still stands today. The movie theater, originally operated By General Cinema, consisted of one screen and later was expanded to two screens. The building currently housing Burlington Coat Factory was opened in the mid-1960s as a Belk Lindsay store which replaced one in Ybor City. In later years it was converted to a J Byron store, followed by an Uptons store in the mid-1990s.

In 1987, Publix closed its Britton Plaza location, with Idaho-based Albertsons moving into the space at the plaza a couple years later. Albertsons helped reshape Britton Plaza to what it is today by undertaking a renovation and expansion of the old Publix space. Publix has now taken over the Albertson's store at Britton Plaza. The entire plaza was renovated to today's appearance during the course of the late 1980s. The movie theater expanded to eight screens and underwent a renovation of its own in 1992.

In 2001, Regal Entertainment, which operated the theater for several years during the 1990s, pulled out of Britton Plaza, further signaling the decline of smaller cinemas and the growth of larger cineplexes. Not long after, Frank's Nursery and Gardens closed down and its building was demolished, making way for a plaza extension in 2003 that brought Michaels and Marshalls to the plaza, as well as the return of Big Lots, which previously sat in the space now occupied by Tuesday Morning. In 2006, Zota Theaters took over the cinema space, hoping for a turnaround in the plaza's movie going business.

2008 signaled a shake-up of sorts for Britton Plaza. The deteriorating economic climate had forced several businesses to close down, including a few local stores. In June of that year, Publix announced that it was purchasing 49 Albertsons stores in Florida, including the Britton Plaza location. When the deal closed in September, Albertsons vacated the plaza and renovation work began a month later. Just days before Albertsons' departure from the plaza, Zota Theaters announced it was pulling out as well. The company was unable to gain steady patrons and compete with bigger movie houses such as the AMC WestShore 14 at nearby WestShore Plaza.

With the "reopening" of Publix on January 8, 2009, and re-opening of the 8-screen movie theater, it seems that Britton Plaza has turned the corner despite the ongoing recession. Additionally, several new businesses had opened in the plaza since 2009; including Arbys, Five Dollar Fashions, Plato's Closet, The Perfect Gift, and the Missing Piece.

== HART Transfer Center ==
Hillsborough Area Regional Transit (HART) operates a transfer center at Britton Plaza. Routes 4, 19, 36, and 89, as well as Pinellas Suncoast Transit Authority's Route 100X, transfer at a shelter structure in the center of the plaza's parking lots.
