= MedicAnimal =

Online pet healthcare retailer

- Type: Private limited company
- Industry: Retail
- Founded: 2007
- Headquarters: Clerkenwell, London, United Kingdom
- Area served: Europe
- Products: Pet healthcare
- Divisions: Retail

MedicAnimal is a London-based online pet healthcare retailer.

== History ==
MedicAnimal is part of the Kokoba group - a privately owned pet food and pet supplies online retailer based in Clerkenwell, London. MedicAnimal was founded in 2007 by veterinarian Andrew Bucher and ex-Goldman Sachs broker Ivan Retzignac. The company acquired three of its competitors in the UK between 2010 and 2012 including Pet Supermarket and Petmeds. In 2019 the company was sold to new owners/managers.
