= The Bradenton Times =

Online newspaper from Bradenton, Florida, US

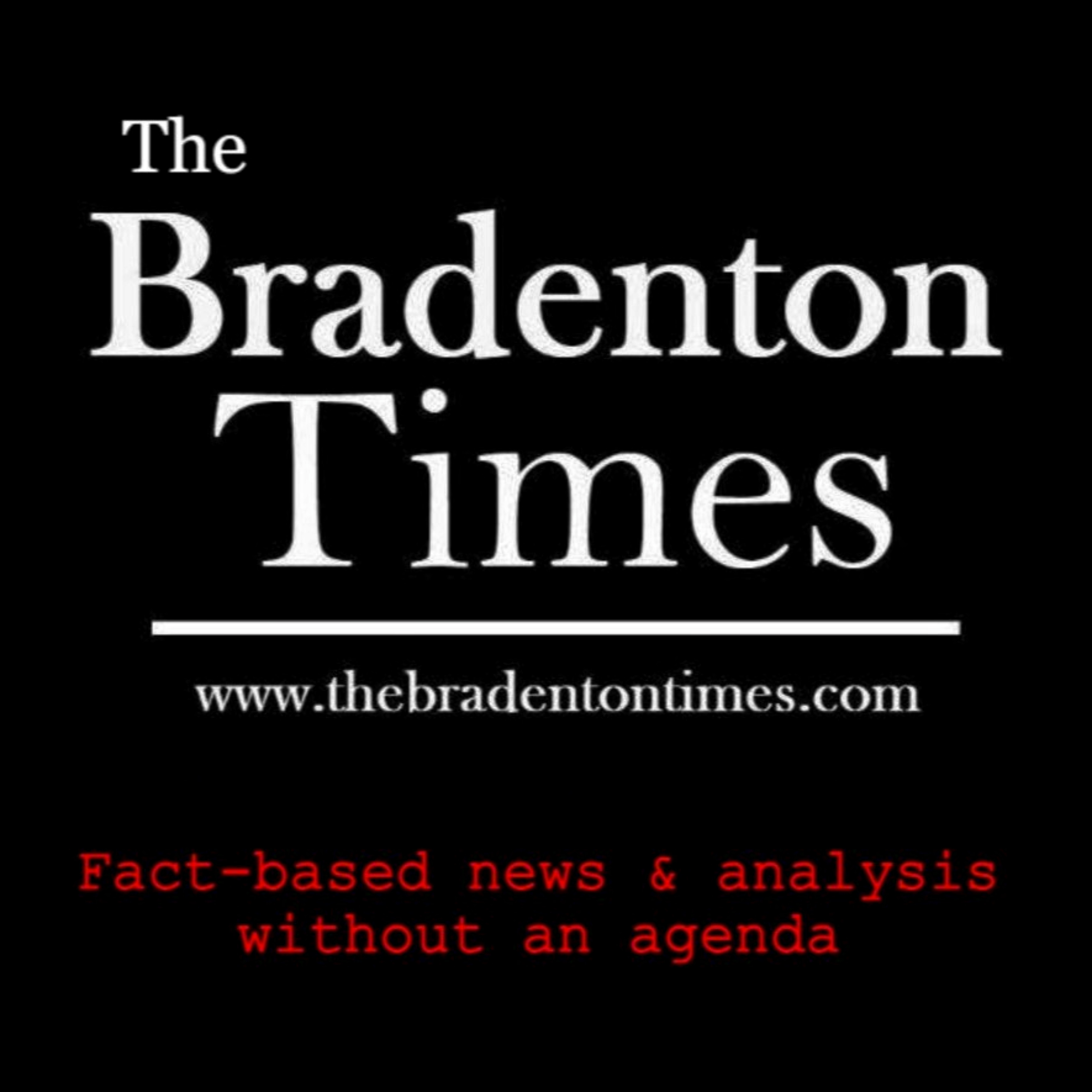
- Type: Triweekly; Mid-week podcasts
- Owner(s): The Bradenton Times, Inc.
- Founder(s): Joe McClash
- Publisher: Joe McClash
- Editor: Dennis "Mitch" Maley
- Staff writers: Dawn Kitterman, Investigative Reporter
- Founded: 2008; 17 years ago
- Language: English
- Headquarters: 405 Twenty-sixth Avenue West
- City: Bradenton
- Country: United States
- ISSN: 2155-2495
- OCLC number: 615600168
- Website: thebradentontimes.com

The Bradenton Times is an online newspaper founded and continuously published on the Internet from Bradenton, Florida. It is a web news and community resource site for Bradenton and Manatee County designed to supply broad coverage of information about the community as well as current local, regional, state, and national news. Podcast interviews were introduced in 2021 and they are posted at mid-week and often, are accompanied by an article of breaking news.

The stated philosophy of The Bradenton Times is to be a community voice by providing news of local, state, and national topics and additionally, by providing readers the opportunity to comment on news articles, submit local photographs, create their own news articles, participate in polls, and provide article-related forums directly on the site.

== History ==
The newspaper was founded by and is published by Joe McClash, a former commissioner for Manatee County (from 1990-2012) and the owner of McClash Rentals, Inc. After serving in the United States Marine Corps from 1975–1979, at the age of twenty-four, he founded McClash Heating And Cooling, continuing that business from 1982–2002.

He founded The Bradenton Times, often abbreviated to TBT, in 2008 to provide a "one-stop" location published for all community information and local news. The paper has a strong focus on local government. Their editorial section advocates for sustainable development, home rule, and government transparency. In 2022, Editor Dennis "Mitch" Maley stated that the paper's "founding ethos" was "good government which is supported by sustainable growth practices."

Official participation in other community government and affairs by McClash includes chair of Manatee County Port Authority, as well as serving on the Manatee County Civic Center Authority, West Coast Inland Navigation District, Environmental Action Commission, Tourist Development Council, and the Sarasota and Manatee Metropolitan Planning Organization. He also has participated in many other organizations in the community such as, CEO Roundtable, Tampa Bay National Estuary Program, Manatee Chamber of Commerce Joint Planning Committee, ITS Program, and the Bradenton Yacht Club.

On April 24, 2017, Joe McClash announced in an article published on the site that The Bradenton Times would end daily publication and become a weekly publication online. In 2021, a mid-weekly podcast was introduced that features interviews and commentary by the editor, Dennis Maley. Additional news updates were added on Wednesdays and Fridays. Also in 2021, Dawn Kitterman joined The Bradenton Times as an investigative reporter, focusing on local government.

Before joining The Bradenton Times, editor Dennis Maley was a freelance writer and regular contributor to a regional magazine, Creative Loafing. Maley also wrote a regular column for Boxing World magazine and had been a featured writer in many health and fitness publications. Initially, the Maley opinion column appeared each Thursday and Sunday and tending to focus on politics, economics, regional planning, and the environment. It continues to be featured on Sundays.
